= 28th Annual Premios Gardel =

2026 edition of Argentine award ceremony

- Date: 26 May 2026
- Location: Teatro Coliseo
- Hosted by: Diego Leuco

Highlights
- Most awards: Milo J (12)
- Most nominations: Milo J (17)
- Website: premiosgardel.org.ar

Television/radio coverage
- Network: TNT; HBO Max

The 28th Annual Premios Gardel honored the best recordings, compositions, and artists from 1 January to 31 December 2025, as chosen by the members of Argentine Chamber of Phonograms and Videograms Producers, on 26 May 2026. In its second year back at Teatro Coliseo in Buenos Aires, the ceremony was broadcast on TNT and HBO Max, and was hosted by Diego Leuco for the first time. Nominations were announced on 29 April 2025. Milo J led the nominations with 17, followed by Lali with 10; Miranda! with nine, Ca7riel & Paco Amoroso with eight, and Trueno with seven.

Milo J was the night's biggest winner with 12 wins, including Album of the Year, Song of the Year, and Record of the Year. Trueno and Ca7riel & Paco Amoroso followed him with four awards each. The Best New Artist award went to Blair. Charly García and Sting won Best Collaboration for "In The City", while Lali won Best Pop Album for No Vayas a Atender Cuando el Demonio Llama, and Best Pop Song por "Mejor Que Vos" alongside Miranda!. Folklore group Los Nocheros received the 2026 Lifetime Achievement Award.

== Background ==
Following the announcement of the nominations on 29 April 2026, the Argentine Chamber of Phonograms and Videograms Producers unveiled several changes and updates for that year's ceremony. These included the elimination, addition, and restructuring of various categories, increasing the total number of awards from 51 to 53 compared to the previous edition.

=== Category changes ===
- Four new categories – Best Hip-Hop/Rap Album, Best Hip-Hop/Rap Song, Best Singer-Songwriter Song, and Best Live Song, for 55 categories total.
- Best Cover Art Design was renamed Best Artwork.
- Best Instrumental/Fusion/World Music Album was split into two separate categories – Best Instrumental Album and Best Global Music Album.
- Best Traditional Pop Artist Album was once again renamed Best Contemporary Romantic Music Album.
- The categories Best Urban Pop Album, Best Urban Pop Song, and Best RKT Song were discontinued.

== Performers ==
Performers were announced on 14 May 2026.

=== Premiere ceremony ===
- Cucuza Castiello
- Joaco Burgos

=== Main ceremony ===
List of performers at the 28th Annual Gardel Awards
| Artist(s) | Song(s) |
|---|---|
| Milo J | "Niño" "Luciérnagas" |
| K4os | "Crimen" "Mente en Blanco" "Rage" |
| Yami Safdie Agustín Bernasconi | "En Otra Vida" "Besos en Pausa" "Querida Yo" |
| Ángela Leiva Coti | "Luz de Día" |
| Roze Max Carra Valen Vargas | "Inocenete" "Tu Jardín con Enanitos" |
| Marilina Bertoldi Lula Bertoldi | "El Gordo" "Quieren Rock" |
| Trueno Simon Gaete | "Fresh" "Turrazo" |

== Winners and nominees ==
The nominations were announced on 24 April 2025. Winners are listed first and highlighted in bold.

=== General Field ===
General Field
**Album of the Year**: **La Vida Era Más Corta – Milo J**; Cuerpos, Vol. 1 – Babasónicos; Latinaje – Cazzu; No Vayas a Atender Cuando el Demonio Llama – Lali; Para Quien Trabajas, Vol. I – Marilina Bertoldi
**Song of the Year**: **"Niño" – Milo J**; **Camilo Joaquín Villarruel, Gregorio Armando Reinaldo Nelli, Mario Del Tránsito Cocomarola, songwriters & composers, Santiago Alvarado, Santiago Gabriel Ruiz, composers**; "Favorita" — Ángela Torres; Ángela Caccia Torres, Isabela Terán Lieban, Fermín Ugarte, Mauro De Tommaso, songwriters & composers; "Advertencia" – Babasónicos; Adrián Rodríguez, songwriter; "#Tetas" – Ca7riel & Paco Amoroso; Catriel Guerreiro, Ulises Guerriero, Rafa Arcaute, Federico Vindver, Vicente Jiménez, Gino Borri, Carolina Isabel Colón Juarbe, songwriters & composers; "Con Otra" – Cazzu; Cazzu, songwriter, Nicolás Cotton, composer; "Mejor Que Vos" – Lali & Miranda!; Mariana Espósito, Mauro De Tommaso, Martin D'Agosto, Alejandro Sergi, songwriters & composers; "El Gordo"" — Marilina Bertoldi; Marilina Bertoldi, songwriter & composer; "Fresh" – Trueno; Mateo Palacios Corazzina songwriter & composer; Santiago Gabriel Ruiz, Lukas Benjamin Leth Kroll, composers; "Querida Yo" — Yami Safdie & Camilo; Yamila Safdie, Camilo Echeverry, songwriters & composers
**Record of the Year**: **"Niño" – Milo J**; **Milo J, Santiago Alvarado, Tatool, producers; Matías Sznaider, Tony Lake, Ted Jensen, recording engineer**; "In The City" – Charly García & Sting; Charly García, producer; Luciano Nicolas Gordillo, recording engineer; "Mejor Que Vos" – Lali & Miranda!; Mauro De Tommaso & Federico Barreto, producers & recording engineers
| **Best New Artist**: **Blair**; 143leti; Chechi de Marcos; Cindy Cats; La Ferni; Las Tussi; Little Boogie & Stereo; María Wolff; Mía Folino; Sofía de Ciervo; Tuli | **Best Collaboration**: **"In The City" – Charly García & Sting**; "Me Contó Un Pajarito" – Fede Vigevani, Luck Ra & Ian Lucas; "Mejor Que Vos" – Lali & Miranda!; "Campera de Cuero" – Los Tabaleros & Las Pastillas del Abuelo; "Tu Misterioso Alguien (Cuarteto)" – Luck Ra & Miranda!; "Jangadero" – Milo J & Mercedes Sosa; "Me Gusta" – Miranda! & Tini; "Mi Vida" – Tan Biónica & Airbag; "Loco Un Poco – Turf & Lali; "Daddy Yankee: Bzrp Music Sessions, Vol. 0" – Bizarrap & Daddy Yankee |

=== Pop ===
Pop
| **Best Pop Album**: **No Vayas a Atender Cuando el Demonio Llama – Lali**; No Me Olvides – Ángela Torres; Mi Norte & Mi Sur – Diego Torres; Perfectas – Emilia; El Verdadero – Juan Ingaramo; Cuerpo – Olivia Wald; Detalles – Zoe Gotusso | **Best Pop Song**: **"Mejor Que Vos" – Lali & Miranda!**; "Favorita" — Ángela Torres; "El Ritmo" – Bandalos Chinos; "El Día del Amigo" – Ca7riel & Paco Amoroso; "Perfecto Final" – Conociendo Rusia & Nathy Peluso; "Me Gusta" – Miranda! & Tini |
| **Best Pop Group Album**: **Nuevo Hotel Miranda! – Miranda!**; Vandalos – Bandalos Chinos; 4ever – K4os | **Best Contemporary Romantic Music Album**: **Gracias a la Vida – Abel Pintos**; Su Amigo Dyango, Vol. 1 – Dyango; Alquimia – Patricia Sosa & Mijares |
**Best Alternative Pop Album**: **Papota – Ca7riel & Paco Amoroso**; En el Ciber – Benito Cerati; Mi Año Gótico – Emmanuel Horvilleur; Tanya – Juana Rosas; Hotcore – Taichu

=== Pop/Rock ===
Pop/Rock
| **Best Pop/Rock Album**: **Polvo de Estrellas – Turf**; Los Lobos – Estelares; Ya No Estoy Aquí – Rayos Láser; Alter Ego – Silvestre y La Naranja; El Regreso – Tan Biónica | **Best Pop/Rock Song**: **"#Tetas" – Ca7riel & Paco Amoroso**; "33" – Lali & Dillom; "Barry Lindo" – El Kuelgue; "Desastres Fabulosos" – Conociendo Rusia & Jorge Drexler; "Tus Cosas" – Tan Biónica & Airbag |

=== Rock ===
Rock
| **Best Rock Album**: **Para Quién Trabajas, Vol. I – Marilina Bertoldi**; Continuará – Fernando Ruiz Díaz; Novela (álbum) – Fito Páez; El (In)Correcto Uso de la Metáfora – Richard Coleman; El Retorno – Santiago C. Motorizado | **Best Rock Song**: **"In the City" – Charly García & Sting**; "Advertencia" – Babasónicos; "Pensando en Ella" – Dante Spinetta; "Aliados en un Viaje" – Divididos; "Volarte" – Eruca Sativa; "El Gordo" – Marilina Bertoldi |
| **Best Rock Group Album**: **Cuerpos, Vol. 1 – Babasónicos**; El club de la pelea I – Airbag; Divididos – Divididos; A Tres Días de la Tierra – Eruca Sativa; El Mato a un Policia Motorizado Sesión 20° Aniversario – Él Mató a un Policía Motorizado; Artificio – Indios | **Best Hard Rock Album**: **Legado – A.N.I.M.A.L.**; Alto Viaje – Corvex; Vive – Claudio Marciello |
**Best Alternative Rock Album**: **Exultante – Carca**; Ceremonia – 1915; Instantáneo – Viva Elástico; Quiero Que lo Que Yo Te Diga Sea un Arma en Tu Arsenal – Winona Riders

=== Urban & Reggae ===
Urban & Reggae
| **Best Urban Album**: **166 (Deluxe) Retirada – Milo J**; Lamba – FMK; Quimera – María Becerra; Saturación Pop – Ysy A; Gotti B – Tiago PZK | **Best Urban Song**: **"Olimpo" – Milo J**; "Daddy Yankee: Bzrp Music Sessions, Vol. 0" – Bizarrap & Daddy Yankee; "Sin Cadenas" – Paulo Londra; "Historia" – Ramma; "Cruz" – Trueno & Feid |
| **Best Urban Collaboration**: **"Gil" – Milo J & Trueno**; "Flashbacks" – Big One, Paulo Londra & Wisin; "Daddy Yankee: Bzrp Music Sessions, Vol. 0" – Bizarrap & Daddy Yankee; "Hasta Que Me Enamoro" – María Becerra & Tini; "La Verdadera" – Ramma & Kidd Voodoo; "Masna (Remix)" – FMK, Emilia, Nicki Nicole & Tiago PZK | **Best Reggae/Ska Album**: **"La Respuesta" – Leonchalon**; "A Tempo" – Dread Mar-I; "Raíces Muy Fuertes" – Fidel Nadal; "Alfonsina y el Mal" – Señor Flavio |
| **Best Hip-Hop/Rap Album**: **El Último Baile (Deluxe) – Trueno**; Bhavilonia – Bhavi; Okupas – Little Boogie & Stereo; Culto III – Neo Pistea; Versus – Paulo Londra; Gauchos – Veeyam | **Best Hip-Hop/Rap Song**: **"Gil" – Milo J & Trueno**; "Cadenas" – Acru; "Retirada" – Milo J; "PVSL" – Paulo Londra; "Fresh" – Trueno |

=== Tango, Jazz & Classical ===
Tango, Jazz & Classical
| **Best Tango Album**: **Pratanguero: 4° Esquina Final – Ariel Prat**; Canciones de Dos Puertos – Alfredo Piro Rinaldi; Actos de Gentileza – Florian | **Best Tango Song**: **"La Marcha de la Bronca" – Quinteto Negro La Boca, León Gieco, Miguel Cantilo, Ivonne Guzmán, Miss Bolivia, Willy Bronca & Julieta Laso**; "Nada" – Ariel Ardit y Lidia Borda; "La Guitarra" – Daniel Melingo & Fito Páez |
| **Best Jazz Album**: **Apocalipsis – Pipí Piazzolla, Lucio Balduini & Damián Fogiel**; New York Sessions Vol. 1 – Leo Genovese & Mariano Otero; Todos los Fuegos – Roxana Amed; Tomás Sainz – Tomás Sainz; Nomads – Valentino Jazz Bazar & Carrie Dianne Ward | **Best Classical Album**: **Compositores Argentinos – Grupal Vocal de Difusión & Mariano Moruja**; Sergio Parotti. Cuarteto de Cuerdas Vol. 1 – Cuarteto Siglo XXII; Marmullo en las Aguas – Las Destrozzi; El Teremín, la Serie y el Boxitracio – Martín Proscia & Pablo Borrás |
**Best Instrumental Tango Orchestra Album**: **EMPA (Escuela de Música Popular de Avellaneda) Orquesta de Tango – EMPA Orquesta de Tango**; Tango – José Colángelo; Tangomorphosis – Pablo Estigarribia

=== Folk ===
Folk
| **Best Folklore Album**: **Décimas – Maggie Cullen**; Fuera de Lugar – Liliana Herrero; Mirarse en Otros Ojos – La Ferni | **Best Folklore Song**: **"Niño" – Milo J**; "Puño y Letra - Puentes Ep.01" – Duratierra, Eli Suárez; "Los Amor Es un Viento Que Regresa" – Los Nocheros; "Décimas" – Maggie Cullen |
| **Best Folklore Group Album**: **FAlklore Vol. 1 y 2 – Esto es ¡FA! & Mex Urtizberea**; Bipolar – Campedrinos; Las Canciones Más Lindas del Mundo, Volumen 2 – Dos Más Uno; Hasta Que Aclare – Eva Sola & Nadia Szachniuk | **Best Alternative Folklore Album**: **89 – Flor Paz**; Los Días por Venir – Lorena Astudillo & Ignacio Montoya Carlotto; Trinar (La Flor) – Nadia Larcher |

=== Instrumental/Fusion/World Music ===
Instrumental/Fusion/World Music
| **Best Instrumental Music Album**: **Solo – Pipí Piazzolla**; Las Cuatro Estaciones – Noelia Sinkunas; La Magia – Quique Sinesi & Astrid Motura | **Best Global Music Album**: **Latinaje – Cazzu**; Impulsa el Círculo – Brenda Martin; Huaucke Habibi – Los Arcanos del Desierto |

=== Tropical & Cuarteto ===
Tropical & Cuarteto
| **Best Tropical/Cumbia Album**: **Malportada – Nathy Peluso**; Homenaje al Chino de La Nueva Luna – Daniel Cardozo; Vol. 1 – El Negro Tecla; La Casa de la Cumbia Vol. 1 – The La Planta | **Best Cuarteto Album**: **Que Sed – Luck Ra**; Mejores Amigos de la Muela – Eugenia Quevedo; En Vivo Buenos Aires – La K'onga; Rompecabezas – Ulises Bueno |
| **Best Tropical/Cumbia Song**: **"Si No Es Muy Tarde (Versión Cumbia)" – Luciano Pereyra, Ezequiel y La Clave, Un Poco de Ruido & Pinky SD**; "Amiga Traidora (Cumbia Texmex)" – Ángela Leiva; "Con Otra" – Cazzu; "Me Contó un Pajarito" – Fede Vigevani, Luck Ra, Ian Lucas; "Echar de Menos" – Ke Personajes; "Tu Jardín con Enanitos" – Roze, Max Carra, Valen & Ramky en los Controles | **Best Cuarteto Song**: **"Tu Misterioso Alguien (Cuarteto)" – Luck Ra & Miranda!**; "No Se Ve / Chingón" – Desakta2; "Julieta & Romeo (En Vivo)" – Ian Lucas & Q' Lokura; "Otra Poesía" – L-Gante, La K'onga; "Hielo, Vino y Coca" – Los Tabaleros & Los Caligaris; "Carita Triste" – Q'Lokura, Los Herrera; "Dios" – Ulises Bueno |
**Best Tropical/Cumbia Group Album**: **El Desvelo – La Delio Valdez**; Todo el Mundo Está Kaliente! – Kchiporros; Uriel Lozano Vol. 2 / Zapada en Vivo en Un Poco de Ruido! – Un Poco de Ruido, Pinky SD, Uriel Lozano

=== Dance/Electronic ===
Dance/Electronic
**Best Electronic Music Album**
- **Peces Raros - Spotify Sessions – Peces Raros**
  - Deseo – Mistol Team
  - X-Sex – Six Sex

=== Live ===
Live
| **Best Live Album**: **Trueno - Red Bull Symphonic – Trueno**; Conociendo Rusia Vuelve a Casa (En Vivo en Buenos Aires) – Conociendo Rusia; En Vivo Volumen I – Cindy Cats; Esencia en Vivo – Cruzando el Charco; Juegue Kuelgue – El Kuelgue; Hilda Canta Charly 2 (En Vivo) – Hilda Lizarazu; Signos 25 Años Vivo – Los Nocheros; Hecho en Jamaica - Vivo Movistar Arena – Nonpalidece | **Best Live Song**: **"La Que Puede, Puede (Live at NPR Music's Tiny Desk)" – Ca7riel & Paco Amoroso**; "Sábado" – Cindy Cats; "Fanático (En Vivo)" – Lali; "La Taleñita" – Milo J & Campedrinos; "Inocente" – Nonpalidece & La Delio Valdez |

=== Children's, Visual Media & Music Video/Film ===
Children's, Visual Media & Music Video/Film
| **Best Short-Form Music Video**: **"Bajo de la Piel" – Milo J**; **Teresa Carril, video director**; "Advertencia" – Babasónicos; Juan Cabral, video director; "#Tetas" – Ca7riel & Paco Amoroso; Martín Piroyansky, video director; "In the City" – Charly García & Sting; Belén Asad & Maximilian Stanfford, video director; "El Gordo" – Marilina Bertoldi; Malena Pichot y Nano Garay Santaló, video director | **Best Long-Form Music Video**: **Papota – Ca7riel & Paco Amoroso**; **Martín Piroyansky, video director**; Sonidos, Barro y Piel - Documental Sobre la Grabación de Divididos – Divididos; Leopoldo Montero Ciancio, video director; No Vayas a Atender Cuando el Demonio Llama – Lali; Lautaro Espósito, video director; Todo Es Folklore – Los Tabaleros; Niko Sedano, video director; La Vida Era Más Corta – Milo J; Teresa Carril & Nacho A. Villar, video director |
| **Best Cinema/Television/Audiovisual Production Soundtrack Album**: **The Last of Us: Season 2 – Gustavo Santaolalla & David Fleming**; La Mujer de la Fila – Daniel Godfrid y Sebastián Espósito; Los Mufas: Suerte para la Desgracia – Los Mufas, Suerte Para la Desgracia | **Best Children's Album**: **Mardearena - Nanas y Arrullos – Magdalena Fleitas**; Cantá con El Reino Infantil: Música para la Familia – El Reino Infantil & La Granja de Zenón; Luna con duendes (Canciones, arrullos y susurros para la hora de dormir) – Mariana Baggio , Teresa Usandivaras, Martin Telechanski , Pablo Spiller & María Emilia López; Al Agua Pez – Pequeño Pez |

=== Singer-Songwriter ===
Singer-Songwriter
| **Best Singer-Songwriter Album**: **Querida Yo – Yami Safdie**; Vivir Así – Barbarita Palacios; Amor de Mi Herida – Camilú; Serenata en Mi Mayor para un Amor y un Atardecer – Coti; Gamurgatrónica – Rubén Rada | **Best Singer-Songwriter Song**: **"Luciérnagas" – Milo J & Silvio Rodríguez**; "Querida Yo" – Yami Safdie & Camilo; "Hielo Fino" – Silvina Moreno |

=== Package, Concept & Historical ===
Singer-SongwriterPackage, Concept & Historical
| **Best Concept Album**: **La Vida Era Más Corta – Milo J**; Sandro Así – Ariel Ardit; Tucumano Soy – Juan Falú | **Best Catalog Collection Album**: **Suiza 1980 (Remastering 2025) – Mercedes Sosa**; Pelusón of Milk (Remasterizado 2025) – Luis Alberto Spinetta; Adiós Sui Generis (50 Años) – Sui Generis |
**Best Artwork**: **Doga – Juana Molina**; **Alejandro Ros, designer**; Cuerpos, Vol. 1 – Babasónicos; Maxi Anselmo, designer; Novela (álbum) – Fito Páez; Mondini, Pippa, Porras, Rompo & Zangari, designers

=== Technical ===
Technical
| **Producer of the Year**: **Evlay**; Cachorro López; Gustavo Santaolalla; Marilina Bertoldi; Mauro De Tommaso; Milo J; Nico Cotton; Santiago Alvarado; Tatool | **Best Engineered Album**: **La Vida Era Más Corta – Milo J**; **Luciano Nicolas Gordillo, recording engineers**; Papota – Ca7riel & Paco Amoroso; Rafa Arcaute, Federico Vindver, LAMADRID, Josh Newell, recording engineers; A Tres Días de la Tierra – Eruca Sativa; Facundo Rodríguez, recording engineers |

== Multiple nominations and awards ==
The following received multiple awards:

12 wins

- Milo J

4 wins

- Ca7riel & Paco Amoroso
- Trueno

3 wins

- Miranda!

2 wins

- Lali
- Luck Ra
- Charly García
- Sting
- Pipí Piazzolla

The following received multiple nominations:

17 nominations

- Milo J

10 nominations

- Lali

9 nominations

- Miranda!

8 nominations

- Ca7riel & Paco Amoroso

7 nominations

- Trueno

6 nominations

- Babasónicos
- Marilina Bertoldi

5 nominations

- Luck Ra

4 nominations

- Cazzu
- Charly García
- Sting
- Paulo Londra
