= Lali Tour 2025 =

2025 concert tour by Lali

- Tour by Lali
- Location: South America; Europe
- Associated album: No Vayas a Atender Cuando El Demonio Llama
- Start date: 24 April 2025
- End date: 26 September 2026
- No. of shows: 31
- Producer: Dale Play Live
- Attendance: 510,000
- Website: www.lalioficial.com

Lali concert chronology
- Lali Tour (2023); Lali Tour 2025 (2025–26); Bailar o Morir Tour (2026–27)

The Lali Tour 2025, later renamed to Lali Tour 2025/26 and known by fans as El Demonio Tour, was the seventh concert tour by Argentine singer Lali in support of her sixth studio album, No Vayas a Atender Cuando El Demonio Llama (2025). The tour commenced at the José Amalfitani Stadium in Buenos Aires on 24 May 2025, and concluded at the Mâs Monumental Stadium in the same city on 26 September 2026.

== Background ==
The tour was announced on 18 December 2024 through Lali's social media accounts. In the video she shared, she appeared on a festive holiday set with a lit Christmas tree in the background, wearing a long, shimmering dress and holding a glass of champagne. The first show announced was the one on 24 May 2025 at the José Amalfitani Stadium in Buenos Aires. Following the release of No Vayas a Atender Cuando el Demonio Llama, additional dates were announced on social media. The initial schedule included 21 shows across cities in Argentina and Uruguay, along with three dates in Spain.

== Production ==
=== Costume design ===
Lali made more than five costume changes in each concert, under the stylistic direction of Marina Venancio, who worked with the artist since her early career in 2014. Most of the tour wardrobe was custom-designed by various fashion houses, including Maximiliano Jitric, Verónica de la Canal, and Guevara Ocampo, among others.

Among the standout looks was an haute couture gown made of weathered dusty pink tulle that faded into a nude tone, featuring a ruched corset and layered pointed panels with a wet-look effect. This outfit was worn during the show's romantic ballad segment, paired with fishnet tights and black boots. In an interview with Para Ti, designer Maximiliano Jitric explained that the concept behind the dress was inspired by "overcoming hardship, facing setbacks without letting them define you, and finding strength to move forward".

For the performance of "Quiénes Son?", Lali wore a custom suit by Verónica de la Canal, consisting of a silk shirt and tie over a glittering corseted bodysuit. Another standout was a tartan set originally designed by British designer Vivienne Westwood, reinterpreted by Guevara Ocampo and customized with Swarovski crystals by Blüend. The look featured a pointed patchwork corset and skirt, completed with an Argentine flag at the back, styled to resemble the brand patch.

== Concert synopsis ==
The show opens with Lali appearing on a raised platform at the back and center of the stage, dressed in black with a leather hat adorned with a star made of rhinestones, a lace bodysuit, and a long fringed coat. The look, reminiscent of Beyoncé's Lemonade (2016) era, sets the tone as she enters to the rock-infused track "Lokura". She continues with "Sexy" and "2 Son 3", joined by six dancers for a choreographed segment as she moves down a catwalk.

The stage design includes pyrotechnic fire jets shooting from the runways, lasers crossing the venue, an overhead light rig, and two giant screens projecting live-generated visuals. The dancer ensemble expands to sixteen performers during "Tu Novia II" and "N5", the latter featuring a live arrangement of Rage Against the Machine's "Killing in the Name", which closes the concert's first act.

After a brief dance interlude and costume change into an all-white ensemble, the second act begins with "Obsesión" and "Diva", marked by sensual choreography and red lighting. Lali then performs "Morir de Amor", a pop ballad with "Morricone-esque" elements that evoke Amy Winehouse's vulnerable side, during which the stage lights turn pink and the tempo slows. The energy ramps up again with "33", accompanied by visuals simulating shattering glass.

Following a dramatic intro underscored by "Popstar", a ringing phone sound introduces a voice-over by Moria Casán, which sets the stage for "Quiénes Son?". Lali appears atop the platform in a tailored suit, flanked by dancers in tuxedos—a nod to Marilyn Monroe and Madonna. She dons boxing gloves for "KO", throwing punches in a choreographed sequence that evokes a boxing ring, complete with dancers holding "Round 3" signs. The set continues with "Baum Baum", "Cómprame Un Brishito", and "Loco Un Poco", where Lali removes her jacket and opens her shirt to reveal a sparkly bodysuit. This third act ends with "Ahora", featuring a lap dance sequence on a chair.

Following a guitar solo by one of the musicians, Lali returns in a white dress for a more intimate fourth act. She performs colorful pop tracks like "Boomerang", then shifts to emotional ballads including "Incondicional", "Perdedor", "Corazón Perdido", and "Ego", all delivered solo with a handheld microphone. She then sits on the stage steps for an acoustic version of "No Hay Héroes", accompanied only by guitar, concluding the act with a stripped-down, personal moment.

The show transitions into a "pop party" segment filled with electropop, dance, and techno sounds. This portion includes songs like "Mejor Que Vos", a disco-funk version of "Histeria", and continues with "1Amor", "S.O.S", "Sola", "Motiveishon", and "Como Tú". The section ends with "Soy", performed alongside sixteen drag queens and sixteen dancers in a choreographed parade down the catwalk, with rainbow visuals filling the screens and culminating in the full LGBTQ flag.

For the finale, Lali makes a final costume change, returning in a T-shirt that reads "Tu popstar fav", echoing an earlier ironic statement from her song "Popstar". The show concludes with high-energy renditions of "Disciplina", "Plástico", and "Fanático". During these numbers, Lali's distorted face appears on the screens, creating a surreal, postmodern nightmare atmosphere enhanced by smoke and lighting effects.

After appearing to end the show, Lali returns for an encore. She performs "Pendeja" in a rock style with the audience clapping along, followed by "No Me Importa", joined by guitarist and producer Mauro De Tomasso. The concert concludes with the screens fading to black, leaving only Lali's new logo on display.

== Commercial performance ==
Tickets for the opening show in Buenos Aires became available on 20 December 2024. Prior to the general sale, Banco Galicia clients had exclusive access to a pre-sale on the same day, which included a 20% discount and interest-free payment options. The ticket release saw overwhelming demand, with over 500,000 people joining the virtual queue. As a result, the first date sold out in less than 24 hours, prompting the addition of a second show. Both originally scheduled dates were later rescheduled to 24 and 25 May due to sporting commitments at the venue. Alongside the announcement of the new dates, a third show was added. Following the May shows, a fourth date had to be added at the same venue due to high demand, which also sold out. At the end of that show, she announced a fifth date at the stadium, scheduled for December that same year—bringing the total number of tickets sold at the stadium to over 220,000 and becoming the first artist in history to schedule five shows at the stadium in the same year.

Concerts in other cities such as Córdoba, Rosario, Mar del Plata, Montevideo, Barcelona and Madrid also saw strong ticket sales and ultimately sold out. In San Luis, demand was significantly high by local standards, prompting a change in venue to accommodate more attendees.

=== Venue records ===
Venue records of the Lali Tour 2025
Dates (2025)	Venue	Region	Description	Ref.
24-25 May 2025 6-7 September 2025 16 December 2025	José Amalfitani Stadium	Argentina	First female Argentine act to sell out a show on its full capacity twice.	
24-25 May 2025 6-7 September 2025 16 December 2025	José Amalfitani Stadium	Argentina	First female Argentine act to sell out a show on its full capacity three times.	
24-25 May 2025 6-7 September 2025 16 December 2025	José Amalfitani Stadium	Argentina	First female Argentine act to sell out a show on its full capacity four times.	
24-25 May 2025 6-7 September 2025 16 December 2025	José Amalfitani Stadium	Argentina	First female Argentine act to sell out a show on its full capacity five times.	
24-25 May 2025 6-7 September 2025 16 December 2025	José Amalfitani Stadium	Argentina	First female Argentine act to sell out a show on its full capacity six times.	
24-25 May 2025 6-7 September 2025 16 December 2025	José Amalfitani Stadium	Argentina	First act to perform five shows in a single year.	
6-7 June 2026 29 September 2026	Mâs Monumental Stadium	Argentina	Fastest Argentine act to sell out a show (2.5 hours).	
6-7 June 2026 29 September 2026	Mâs Monumental Stadium	Argentina	Fastest Argentine act to sell out two shows (7 hours).	
6-7 June 2026 29 September 2026	Mâs Monumental Stadium	Argentina	First female Argentine act to perform three shows on a single tour.	

== Critical reception ==
Marcelo Fernández Bitar of Clarín described the show as "flawless, on par with the best international stars", highlighting Lali's musical evolution and versatility throughout the performance. Similar thoughts were shared by Antonella Lopreato of Billboard Argentina, who called her "a full-blown rockstar" in top form, beyond the pop label. She also pointed out the performance of "Soy" as one of the most striking moments of the night, featuring sixteen drag queens in what she described as an "explosive parade of color and freedom". Morena Pardo of La Capital praised the concert's narrative and noted that "the overall production has nothing to envy from a Lady Gaga or Madonna show", while Martina Bonin of Ámbito called the performance "historic" and reaffirmed Lali's place as "one of the strongest figures in the Latin American music industry".

Yanet Ingravallo of Todo Noticias stated that Lali "proved herself to be on par with a pop superstar", describing the production as "impressive" and filled with "epic moments" throughout the show. For Antonella Punzino of Filo News, it was "a statement turned into a performance", offering "a monumental celebration that moved between the intimate and the grand". Florencia Falcone of La Nación highlighted Lali's "overwhelming energy" and praised the choreography and costumes, while Yumber Vera Rojas of Página 12 remarked that the show had a distinctly Argentine identity, even as its structure recalled pop figures such as Shakira, Miley Cyrus, Rihanna, or Taylor Swift. He referred to Lali as "the gladiator of Argentine pop".

Ayelén Cisneros of Rolling Stone noted that the concert was built around three distinct moods: rock, romantic ballads, and upbeat pop hits. She also emphasized the artist's charisma and repeated gestures of support for the LGBTQ community. Micaela Mora of Minuto Uno described the show as "an immersive and emotional experience", stating it showcased Lali's talent and professionalism while reinforcing her role as "the Queen of Argentine Pop". Marianel Battaglia of Perfil remarked that the artist delivered a show that exceeded expectations, highlighting her "hypnotic presence and charisma" as well as "a colossal stage production". Florencia Ojeda of El Cronista praised the setlist and Lali's stage presence, saying it reflected "her current musical moment" and underlined her strong interaction with the audience. Lastly, Brenda Petrone Veliz of La Voz del Interior highlighted the staging, choreography, and dancers during the Córdoba show, describing Lali as "expressive, sensual, and provocative".

== Bomb threat ==
On 2 August 2025, Lali's scheduled concert at the Aldo Cantoni Stadium in San Juan was delayed due to a bomb threat. Minutes before the show was set to begin, an anonymous caller contacted emergency services claiming to have planted an explosive device at the venue and included a slur-laden message targeting the singer for her perceived political views. As a precaution, authorities carried out a partial evacuation of the venue and initiated a full security protocol, including the deployment of police, firefighters, and a bomb squad. No explosive device was found, and the threat was ultimately deemed false.

After safety was confirmed, attendees were allowed to re-enter the stadium, and the concert began at approximately 10:30 p.m., about an hour and a half later than scheduled. Throughout the incident, Lali's production team maintained communication with fans through social media, assuring them that their safety was the top priority.

Toward the end of the show, Lali addressed the situation on stage with a message condemning hatred and violence: "This is why I once said publicly: how dangerous and sad violence is—how dangerous hatred toward others is. It leads to the worst possible place". She thanked the audience for their support and resilience, saying, "You reminded me why and for what I do this". The incident reignited public discourse surrounding Lali's prior political statements and ongoing tensions with President Javier Milei, who has publicly criticized the singer in the past.

Four days after the incident, on 6 August, police arrested 74-year-old Juan Carlos Salem as the suspected perpetrator. The arrest followed a targeted investigation by the UFI Genérica in San Juan, which led to a search of Salem's residence in the La Bebida neighborhood. During the raid, authorities seized a .22 caliber firearm and cell phones, including one believed to have been used in the threat. Salem reportedly confessed to making the call and later destroying the phone he used.

He was charged with intimidación pública (public intimidation) and remains in custody awaiting formal judicial proceedings. The presence of an unregistered weapon could further aggravate the charges. During his arrest, Salem insulted journalists and made threatening remarks toward photographers, escalating the gravity of the case. During the investigation, prosecutors examined whether the motive qualified as a hate crime, which could have led to more severe legal consequences.

On 9 August 2025, Salem was convicted in a fast-track trial and sentenced to three years in suspended prison. He also received a fine of ARS $10,000 for illegal possession of a firearm, and the revolver confiscated during the raid was permanently seized. Salem admitted his responsibility during the trial.

== Philanthropy ==
In the days leading up to the start of the tour, Lali joined the non-governmental organization Ningún Pibe Con Hambre in a charitable campaign aimed at collecting non-perishable food to support community kitchens and outreach centers in underprivileged areas of Buenos Aires. During her concerts at the José Amalfitani Stadium, a designated space was set up for attendees to donate food. At the end of the shows, the organization reported an overwhelming response from fans, with over 1,200 tonnes of food collected during the May shows, and 2,000 tonnes during the September shows. The same initiative took place during the concerts in Mendoza and San Juan where fans were once again encouraged to bring non-perishable food items to support the campaign.

== Set list ==
This set list is from the 24 May 2025 concert in Buenos Aires.

Act I

1. "Lokura"
2. "Sexy"
3. "2 Son 3"
4. "Tu Novia II"
5. "N5" (contains elements of "Killing in the Name")

Act II

6. "Obsesión"
7. "Diva"
8. "Morir de Amor"
9. "33"

Act III

10. "Quiénes Son?"
11. "KO"
12. "Baum Baum"
13. "Cómprame Un Brishito"
14. "Loco Un Poco"
15. "Ahora"

Act IV

16. "Boomerang"
17. "Incondicional"
18. "Perdedor"
19. "Corazón Perdido"
20. "Ego"
21. "No Hay Héroes"

Act V

22. "Mejor Que Vos" (interlude with elements of "Popstar")
23. "Histeria"
24. "1 Amor"
25. "S.O.S"
26. "Sola"
27. "Motiveishon"
28. "Como Tú"

Act VI

29. "Soy"

Act VII

30. "Disciplina"
31. "Plástico"
32. "Fanático"

Encore

33. "Pendeja"
34. "No Me Importa" (contains elements of "Argentine National Anthem")

=== Alterations and notes ===
- During the May and December 2025 shows in Buenos Aires, Lali was joined onstage by Moria Casán to perform "Quiénes Son?".
- During the 25 May show in Buenos Aires, Lali performed the Argentine National Anthem in honor of Argentina's May Revolution.
- During the show in Santiago del Estero, Lali performed a cover of "Zamba para Olvidarte" by Mercedes Sosa.
- During the September 2025 shows in Buenos Aires, Lali performed a cover of "Vencedores Vencidos" by Patricio Rey y sus Redonditos de Ricota.
- Beginning with the 6 September 2025 concert in Buenos Aires, "Payaso" was added to the set list succeeding "Pendeja".
- During the show in Santa María de Punilla, Lali performed a cover of "Los Viejos Vinagres" by Sumo.
- During the 2026 shows in Buenos Aires, "Ji Ji Ji" by Patricio Rey y sus Redonditos de Ricota was played during "No Me Importa" as a tribute to the passing of Indio Solari.
- During the 2026 shows in Buenos Aires, Lali performed "Tu Novia" after "Tu Novia II".
- During the 2026 shows in Buenos Aires, fragments of "Laligera", "Asesina", and "Eclipse" were played as an interlude before "Quiénes Son?".
- During the 2026 shows in Buenos Aires, Lali performed "Amor Es Presente" after "Morir de Amor" instead of "33", which was moved to the encore preceding "Pendeja".
- During the 26 September 2026 show in Buenos Aires, Lali performed a cover of "Ciudad de Pobres Corazones" by Fito Páez.

=== Special guests ===
- 24–25 May 2025 — Buenos Aires: "Loco Un Poco" with Joaquín Levinton.
- 24–25 May 2025 — Buenos Aires: "Mejor Que Vos" with Miranda!
- 24–25 May 2025 — Buenos Aires: "S.O.S" with Taichu.
- 25 May 2025 — Buenos Aires: "33" with Dillom.
- 6–7 September 2025 — Buenos Aires: "33" with Dillom.
- 6 December 2025 — Montevideo: "Cambio Dolor" and "Tu Veneno" with Natalia Oreiro.
- 16 December 2025 — Buenos Aires: "33" with Dillom.
- 16 December 2025 — Buenos Aires: "Soy Lo Que Soy" with Sandra Mihanovich.
- 6–7 June 2026 — Buenos Aires: "Mejor Que Vos" with Miranda!
- 6–7 June 2026 — Buenos Aires: "Can't Get You Out of My Head" and "Padam Padam" with Kylie Minogue.
- 6–7 June 2026 — Buenos Aires: "Plástico" with Duki
- 6–7 June 2026 — Buenos Aires: "33" with Dillom.
- 26 June 2026 — Buenos Aires: "Mejor Que Vos" with Miranda!
- 26 June 2026 — Buenos Aires: "Like a Virgin" with Tini and Marilina Bertoldi, and "1 Amor" with Tini.
- 26 June 2026 — Buenos Aires: "33" with Dillom.

== Tour dates ==
List of 2025 concerts
Date (2025)	City	Country	Venue
24 May (Note: The concerts on 24 and 25 May 2025 in Buenos Aires were originally set to take place on 30 April and 1 May 2025, respectively, but were postponed due to sporting commitments at the venue.)	Buenos Aires	Argentina	José Amalfitani Stadium
25 May	Buenos Aires	Argentina	José Amalfitani Stadium
7 June	Córdoba	Argentina	Plaza de la Música
14 June	Rosario	Argentina	Metropolitano
21 June	Mar del Plata	Argentina	Estadio Islas Malvinas
28 June	Montevideo	Uruguay	Antel Arena
3 July	Salta	Argentina	Estadio Delmi
5 July	Tucumán	Argentina	Club Central Córdoba
6 July	Santiago del Estero	Argentina	Estadio Tito Molinari
11 July	Corrientes	Argentina	Playón Boca Unidos
12 July	Santa Fe	Argentina	Estación Belgrano
30 July (Note: The concert on 30 July 2025 in San Luis was originally set to take place at Microestadio Ave Fénix but was moved to Royal Arena due high demand.)	San Luis	Argentina	Royal Arena
1 August	San Juan	Argentina	Estadio Aldo Cantoni
2 August	Mendoza	Argentina	Arena Maipú
6 September	Buenos Aires	Argentina	José Amalfitani Stadium
7 September	Buenos Aires	Argentina	José Amalfitani Stadium
1 October	Barcelona	Spain	Razzmatazz
4 October	Seville	Spain	Pandora
6 October	Madrid	Spain	La Riviera
15 October	Trelew	Argentina	Gimnasio Municipal 1
16 October	Comodoro Rivadavia	Argentina	Predio Ferial
18 October	Neuquén	Argentina	Estadio Ruca Che
6 December	Montevideo	Uruguay	Rambla of Montevideo
16 December	Buenos Aires	Argentina	José Amalfitani Stadium

List of 2026 concerts
Date (2026)	City	Country	Venue
7 February (Note: The concert on 7 February 2026 in Paraná was part of Fiesta del Mate.)	Paraná	Argentina	Plaza de las Colectividades
14 February (Note: The concert on 14 February 2026 in Santa María de Punilla was part of the Cosquín Rock festival.)	Santa María de Punilla	Argentina	Aeródromo Santa María de Punilla
20 February (Note: The concert on 20 February 2026 in El Calafate was part of Fiesta Nacional de Lago.)	El Calafate	Argentina	Anfiteatro del Bosque
22 February (Note: The concert on 22 February 2026 in General Roca was part of Fiesta de la Manzana.)	General Roca	Argentina	Predio Ferial Municipal
6 June	Buenos Aires	Argentina	Mâs Monumental Stadium
7 June	Buenos Aires	Argentina	Mâs Monumental Stadium
26 September	Buenos Aires	Argentina	Mâs Monumental Stadium

== Notes ==
Notes for rescheduled shows

Notes for festival appearances
