= Plástico =

2025 single by Lali and Duki

Single by Lali and Duki

from the album No Vayas a Atender Cuando El Demonio Llama
- Released: 29 April 2025
- Genre: Pop; electropop; pop rock
- Length: 2:58
- Label: Sony Argentina
- Songwriters: Mariana Espósito; Mauro Lombardo; Mauro De Tommaso; Federico Barreto; Martín D'Agosto; Juan Giménez Kuj; Isabela Terán Lieban
- Producers: Mauro De Tommaso; Don Barreto

Lali singles chronology
"33" (2025)	"Plástico" (2025)	"Para Dos" (2025)

Duki singles chronology
"Nena Sad (Remix)" (2025)	"Plástico" (2025)	"No Confundan" (2025)

Music video
- "Plástico" on YouTube

"Plástico" (transl. "plastic") is a song recorded by Argentine singer Lali and Argentine rapper Duki, included on Lali's sixth studio album, No Vayas a Atender Cuando el Demonio Llama (2025). It was written by the both artists alongside BB Asul, Juan Giménez Kuj, Martín D'Agosto, Mauro De Tommaso, and Don Barreto, while production was handled by the latter two. The track was promoted to radio as the album's fifth single.

The song received a generally favorable response from critics, who highlighted it as one of the strongest tracks on the album and praised the experimental nature of the collaboration between both artists.

== Background ==
In 2023, Lali revealed that Duki had visited the studio during the recording sessions of her fifth album, Lali (2023), stating that he spent a night listening to the material, establishing an early creative connection between the two artists.

In October 2024, following the announcement of her then-upcoming single "Fanático", Lali gave an interview to Shangay in which she discussed the production process of the song and her next album, mentioning potential musical genres and future collaborations. This would mark her return to collaborations after her fourth studio album, Libra (2020).

After the official announcement of No Vayas a Atender Cuando el Demonio Llama, Lali revealed the album's tracklist on 31 March 2025, with "Plástico" listed as the fourth track. However, the featured artists were not disclosed until one week after, when the album's Spotify pre-save became available and revealed the collaborations, confirming Duki's participation on the track.

In a 2025 interview promoting the album, Lali explained how the collaboration came together, describing it as "a luxury". She stated that Duki personally chose "Plástico" from the songs she presented to him and wrote his verse spontaneously during the studio session, noting that she had imagined him on more rock-oriented tracks, while he gravitated toward what she described as an "aggressive pop" song.

== Music and lyrics ==
"Plástico" has a duration of two minutes and fifty-eight seconds. The song was written by Lali and Duki alongside Martín D'Agosto, BB Asul, Juan Giménez Kuj, Mauro De Tommaso, and Don Barreto, with production handled by De Tommaso and Barreto. Barreto also contributed instrumentation, performing guitar, keyboards, and drums. Juan Giménez Kuj played electric bass and keyboards, while Santiago Nápoles performed additional guitar parts. Dave Kutch handled mastering, and Lewis Pickett was responsible for mixing.[6]

Musically, the track is rooted in pop and electropop, incorporating pop rock influences. The song also contains a subtle sample referencing Charly García, specifically echoing the scream that opens "No Me Dejan Salir", which appears faintly within "Plástico".

Lyrically and conceptually, the song critiques superficial fame and industry hypocrisy, reinforcing themes of defiance and authenticity. It prominently features the line that gives the album its title, "No vayas a atender cuando el demonio llama" (transl. you better not answer when the devil calls) interpreted as a metaphor for resisting fabricated enemies and public controversy imposed on artists.

== Critical reception ==
"Plástico" was met with mostly positive reviews from music critics. Lucas Terrazas of Infobae noted that Duki brings "his raw and urban imprint, which contrasts with the album's sonic foundation while strengthening its disruptive direction". Moreover, Brenda Petrone Veliz of La Voz del Interior remarked that, despite stylistic differences, the song recalls works such as "#Tetas" by Ca7riel & Paco Amoroso or the social commentary present in The Substance (2024). Griselda Flores of Billboard described the song to be "powered by a riveting, high-energy beat". Additionally, Billboard readers voted it their favorite new Latin music release of the week in a reader poll published on May 2; the song received more than 50 percent of the vote, outperforming new releases by artists including Gloria Trevi, Fuerza Regida and Grupo Frontera.

Lucía Riva Palacio Smith of Rolling Stone highlighted the Argentine rapper's contribution and described the track as "energizing". Meanwhile, Rocío Pascal of RedBoing commented that the collaboration "breaks all expectations", emphasizing that it sounds organic rather than forced. Also, Samantha Plaza Monroy of Big Bang News pointed out the song's nods to classic Argentine rock sonorities. In his review for Los 40, Adriano Moreno observed that Duki ventures into largely unexplored territory, adopting a more pop-oriented sound that departs from his usual style, while also praising both artists' ability to step outside their comfort zones.

Among less favorable reviews, Celine Albornoz of Diario Río Negro stated that "Plástico" "fails to fully work due to its similarity to other songs by the artist and lyrics that verge on the generic".

== Charts ==
=== Weekly charts ===
Weekly chart performance for "Plástico"
Chart (2025)	Peak position
Argentina Hot 100 (Billboard)	25
Argentina National Songs (Monitor Latino)	17
Argentina Pop Rhythmic (Monitor Latino)	13
Peru Pop (Monitor Latino)	16

=== Year-end charts ===
2025 year-end chart performance for "Plástico"
Chart (2025)	Position
Argentina Pop Airplay (Monitor Latino)	66

== Certifications ==
Region	Certification	Certified units/sales
Argentina (CAPIF)	Gold	10,000^{‡}
^{‡} Sales+streaming figures based on certification alone.
