= 1 Amor =

2023 song by Lali

- Live version cover

Single by Lali

from the album Spotify Singles
- Released: 26 August 2026
- Recorded: 2023
- Genre: Pop; electropop
- Length: 2:32
- Label: Sony Argentina
- Songwriters: Mariana Espósito; Martin D'Agosto; Mauro De Tommaso
- Producer: Mauro De Tommaso

Lali singles chronology
"Miss Universo" (2026)	"1 Amor" (2026)	"Bailar o Morir" (2026)

Music video
- "1Amor (En Vivo)" on YouTube

"1 Amor" (transl. "one love", stylized in camel case) is a song by Argentine singer Lali. Initially, the song was available exclusively on Spotify, where it was released as part of her second extended play, Spotify Singles (2023), alongside her cover of "Yegua" by Argentine rock band Babasónicos. After being included in the set list of Lali's 2025-2026 tour, "1 Amor" gained popularity, leading Sony Music Argentina to release it as a live single on 26 August 2026.

The song's lyrics explore the desire to find a healthy and reciprocal romantic relationship after experiencing emotional disappointment. Lali explained that "1 Amor" is about deserving a relationship in which one is loved authentically and treated well, while rejecting dishonesty, betrayal and toxic behavior.

== Background and release ==
On 1 September 2023, Lali released "1 Amor" as part of Spotify Singles, a recording series in which artists release exclusive versions or new recordings of their music. The release also included a cover of "Yegua", originally recorded by Babasónicos. Both tracks were initially available exclusively on Spotify.

The release took place during the period surrounding Lali's fifth studio album, Lali (2023), which featured pop and electronic influences. Lali discussed the creative process behind the Spotify Singles recordings in interviews accompanying their release.

=== Live release ===
On 26 August 2026, Lali released a live version of the song, making it available outside its original Spotify Singles release. The recording was accompanied by a music video featuring footage from her performances at José Amalfitani Stadium and Monumental Stadium in Buenos Aires. The live release followed the song's growing presence in Lali's concert repertoire. Argentine media outlets reported on the role of audience participation and the bridal imagery in the performances, describing "1 Amor" as a recurring moment of interaction between the singer and her fans.

=== Performance with Tini ===
On 26 September 2026, Argentine singer Tini joined Lali onstage during the final concert of the Lali Tour 2025 at the Monumental Stadium in Buenos Aires. The two performed "1 Amor" together, both wearing wedding dresses as they were set to marry their respective fiancés. Their appearance followed a performance of Madonna's "Like a Virgin", in which they were also joined by Argentine singer Marilina Bertoldi. The three performers recreated elements of Madonna's 2003 MTV Video Music Awards performance with Britney Spears and Christina Aguilera.

The performance marked the first time Lali and Tini shared a stage. Both singers began their careers as child performers before becoming prominent figures in Argentine pop music, and their potential collaboration had been a subject of fan anticipation. Their appearance together received coverage from Argentine and international Spanish-language media, who described it the event as a significant moment for Argentine pop culture. The performance also attracted attention because of the longstanding comparisons between the two artists. Although their careers had frequently been discussed in relation to one another, the joint performance brought them together onstage for the first time.

== Composition and lyrics ==
"1 Amor" is a pop song with electronic influences, written by Lali, Martín D'Agosto, and Mauro De Tommaso, and produced by the latter. The song was developed by first establishing its instrumental arrangement, followed by the melody and lyrics. Lali described the creative process as similar to that of her self-titled album, Lali (2023), explaining that both projects began with a defined musical direction and sound.

Lyrically, "1 Amor" addresses the end of an unhealthy relationship and the desire to find a love based on mutual affection, honesty and acceptance. The lyrics describe the decision to leave a relationship that has become emotionally damaging, while expressing the hope of finding a partner who accepts the singer as she is and does not resort to manipulation or deception. In a statement shared through her Instagram broadcast channel, Lali explained that the song was about deserving a good kind of love, rejecting people who are unfaithful, dishonest or toxic, and recognizing that one can aspire to a relationship in which one is genuinely loved and treated well. Some fan interpretations and media outlets have associated "1 Amor" with Spanish singer Rels B, with whom Lali was rumored to have had a romantic relationship.

== Commercial performance ==
"1 Amor" debuted at number 74 on the Billboard Argentina Hot 100, while "Yegua" reached number 73. Both songs charted following their release as part of Spotify Singles in 2023. Following the 2026 single's live release, the song re-entered the chart at number 30 and peaked at number 18 the week after.

On 3 October 2026, the live version of the song featuring Tini was the second most viewed music video worldwide on Spotify.

== Charts ==
Weekly chart performance for "1 Amor"
Chart (2023)	Peak position
Argentina Hot 100 (Billboard)	74

Weekly chart performance for "1 Amor"
Chart (2026)	Peak position
Argentina Hot 100 (Billboard)	18
Argentina National Songs (Monitor Latino)	13
