= 25th Annual Premios Gardel =

2023 Argentine music awards ceremony

- Date: May 16, 2023
- Country: Argentina
- Hosted by: Iván de Pineda

Highlights
- Most awards: Trueno (4)
- Most nominations: Trueno (9)
- Website: premiosgardel.org.ar

Television/radio coverage
- Network: Star+

The 25th Annual Premios Gardel ceremony were held on May 16, 2023, at the Movistar Arena in Buenos Aires, for the second consecutive year. It recognized the best recordings, compositions and artists of the eligibility year, from January 1 to December 31, 2022, as determined by the members of the Argentine Chamber of Phonograms and Videograms Producers. The nominees for the different categories were announced on April 11 of the same year. The ceremony was presented by Iván de Pineda, who hosted the 2019 ceremony; and broadcast live through the Star+ platform. Rapper Trueno received the most nominations with nine, followed by singer Dante Spinetta with seven and the band Babasónicos with six.

== Performances ==
Artist(s)	Song(s)
Los Fabulosos Cadillacs	"Matador"
María Becerra	"Desafiando el Destino"

== Winners and nominees ==
Winners are listed in bold.

=== General ===
Album of the Year

- **Bien o Mal – Trueno**
- Sueños (Un viaje en el tiempo) – Ciro y los Persas with Orquesta Filarmónica de Mendoza
- La Nena de Argentina – María Becerra
- Trinchera avanzada – Babasónicos
- Mesa dulce – Dante Spinetta

Song of the Year

- "**La Triple T**" – Tini
- "Bye Bye" – Babasónicos
- "Tierra zanta" – Trueno
- "Argentina" – Trueno with Nathy Peluso
- "Fiesta time" – Leo Genovese
- "Muchachos, ahora nos volvimos a ilusionar" – La Mosca Tsé - Tsé
- "Una mujer como tú" – Luciano Pereyra with Los Ángeles Azules
- "Quevedo: Bzrp Music Sessions, Vol. 52" – Bizarrap with Quevedo
- "Todos nos vamos a morir igual" – Los Tekis with Los Auténticos Decadentes

Record of the Year

- "**Argentina**" – Trueno with Nathy Peluso
- "Quevedo: Bzrp Music Sessions, Vol. 52" – Bizarrap with Quevedo
- "La Triple T" – Tini

Recording Engineer of the Year

- **Mesa dulce (Dante Spinetta) – Oscar Herrera, Mariano López and Randy Merril**
- Bien o mal (Trueno) – Brian Taylor and Santiago Ruiz
- Sueño (Un viaje en el tiempo) (Ciro y los Persas with Orquesta Filarmonica de Mendoza) – Alvaro Villagra

Best New Artist

- **Mi propia casa – Noelia Recalde**
- Dije que no me iba a enamorar – Yami Safdie
- Me cansé de hacer canciones (que no salgan si no estoy llorando) – Paz Carrara
- Yo canto versos – Maggie Cullen
- Taichu – Taichu

=== Pop ===
Best Pop Artist Album

- **Antigua – Hilda Lizarazu**
- De hoy en adelante – Luciano Pereyra
- Tú Crees en Mí? – Emilia

Best Pop Group Album

- **El Big Blue – Bandalos Chinos**
- Isla de oro – Mi Amigo Invencible
- Canciones escondidas II – Los Rancheros

Best Alternative Pop Album

- **Shasei – Benito Cerati**
- Fuera de lugar – 1915
- Summer Pack – Juan Ingaramo

Best Pop Song

- **"Muchachos, ahora nos volvimos a ilusionar" – La Mosca Tsé - Tsé**
- "Una mujer como tú" – Luciano Pereyra with Los Ángeles Azules
- "La Triple T" – Tini

=== Rock ===
Best Rock Artist Album

- **Lebón & Co Vol.2 – David Lebón**
- Mojigata – Marilina Bertoldi
- Mesa dulce – Dante Spinetta

Best Rock Group Album

- **Dopelganga – Eruca Sativa**
- Sueños (Un viaje en el tiempo) – Ciro y los Persas with Orquesta Filarmónica de Mendoza
- Alejado de la red – La Renga

Best Alternative Rock Album

- **Trinchera avanzada – Babasónicos**
- Fotografías – Sig Ragga
- El mundo no se hizo en dos diás – Pedro Aznar

Best Hard Rock/Punk Album

- **Intimo extremo - 30 años – A.N.I.M.A.L.**
- Mil imperios – Mica Racciatti with Set Eléctrico
- El laberinto de neblina – Expulsados

Best Rock Song

- **"El lado oscuro del corazón" – Dante Spinetta**
- "La cena" – Marilina Bertoldi
- "Todo de mí" – Pedro Aznar

=== Folklore ===
Best Folklore Artist Album

- **Agua de flores – Paola Bernal**
- Mi destino – Martín Paz
- Peregrina – Lorena Astudillo

Best Folklore Group Album

- **Patio Vol.II – Juan Quintero, Andrés Pilar and Santiago Segret**
- Las canciones más lindas del mundo – Dos más uno
- Salinas-Vitale: Desde el alma – Lito Vitale and Luis Salinas

Best Alternative Folklore Album

- **Salve – Noelia Sinkunas**
- Vengo – Don Olimpio
- El valle encantado – Feli Colina

Best Folklore Song

- **"Yo canto versos" – Maggie Cullen**
- "Nada (Remix)" – Los del portezuelo with Destino San Javier
- "Todos nos vamos a morir igual" – Los Tekis with Los Auténticos Decadentes

=== Cuarteto ===
Best Cuarteto Artist Album

- **No me pueden parar – Ulises Bueno**
- Justo a tiempo – Magui Olave
- El Dani en guardia – Dani Guardia

Best Cuarteto Group Album

- **Sin límites (10 noches mágicas en el Gran Rex) – La K'onga**
- Enamorarte – La Barra
- Recordando éxitos – Tru-la-lá

Best Cuarteto Song

- **"Ya no vuelvas (Versión cuarteto)" – Luck Ra, La K'onga and Ke Personajes**
- "Me levante" – Ulises Bueno
- "Olvídate (Remix)" – La K'onga and Rusherking

=== Tropical ===
Best Tropical Artist Album

- **Evidencias – Dalila**
- Roto corazón – Mario Luis
- El ángel que me guía desde el cielo – El Polaco

Best Tropical Group Album

- **La ruta de oro – Los Palmeras**
- After en Hong Kong – Sabor canela y un poquito de café
- En vivo – La Nueva Luna

Best Tropical Song

- **"Inocente (En vivo en el Luna Park)" – La Delio Valdez and Karina**
- "Me parece que" – Grupo alegría de Santa Fe and Marcos Castelló Kaniche
- "Como le gusta" – Ráfaga

=== Tango ===
Best Tango Artist Album

- **Cabeza negra – Julieta Laso**
- Viejo Buenos Aires – Ariel Ardit
- Mi ciudad y mi gente – Inés Cuello

Best Tango Group Album

- **El hilo invisible – Lidia Borda and Luis Borda**
- Milonga universal – Amores Tangos
- Spinettango – Spinettango

Best Tango Song

- **"Oda a las huelgas patagónicas" – Quinteto negro la boca featuring Ana Sofía Stamponi and Ernesto Zeppa**
- "Vuelvo al sur" – Lidia Borda and Luis Borda
- "Corazón maldito" – Julieta Laso
