= No Vayas a Atender Cuando el Demonio Llama =

2025 studio album by Lali

Studio album by Lali
- Released: 29 April 2025
- Genres: Pop; rock; electropop
- Length: 37:27
- Language: Spanish
- Label: Sony Argentina
- Producers: Mauro De Tommaso; Don Barreto

Lali chronology
Lali (2023)	No Vayas a Atender Cuando el Demonio Llama (2025)	Bailar o Morir (2026)

Singles from No Vayas a Atender Cuando el Demonio Llama
- 1. "Fanático" Released: 27 September 2024; 2. "No Me Importa" Released: 26 November 2024; 3. "Mejor Que Vos" Released: 6 February 2025; 4. "33" Released: 24 April 2025; 5. "Plástico" Released: 29 April 2025

No Vayas a Atender Cuando el Demonio Llama (transl. You Better Not Answer When the Devil Calls) is the sixth studio album by Argentine singer Lali. It was released on 29 April 2025 by Sony Music Argentina. The album was mostly written in collaboration with Martín D'Agosto and Mauro De Tommaso—both of whom previously worked on her 2023 album Lali—and also features contributions from BB Asul, Juan Giménez Kuj, Don Barreto, and others. Production was led by De Tommaso and Barreto. Musically, the album marks a departure from Lali's earlier work, embracing a sound rooted in rock, pop rock, and electropop, with influences from alternative rock, punk rock, pop-punk, and disco.

The album was met with critical acclaim, praised for its production, introspective songwriting, and Lali's foray into rock music. It has been described as her most personal and authentic work to date. Commercially, the album debuted at number one in Argentina, becoming Lali's sixth chart-topping release in the country. It went on to spend a record-breaking ten weeks at number one on the chart and become the best-selling Argentine album of 2025. Upon release, six tracks from the album entered the Billboard Argentina Hot 100 simultaneously, along with an additional collaboration.

To support the release, Lali embarked on the Lali Tour 2025, with initial shows in Argentina and subsequent performances scheduled across Latin America and Europe.

== Background ==
In April 2023, Lali gave an interview to El País in which she discussed the production of her self-titled fifth album. She highlighted the closing track "Sola", recorded in Uruguay, describing it as an "outro" and hinting that it offered a glimpse into the sound she would explore in the future. That same year, she embarked on the Lali Tour, performing across multiple countries with a particular focus on European festivals.

In a July interview with Shangay, Lali revealed she was working on a new album, drawing inspiration from "timeless classics" and the sounds of the 1980s and 1990s, citing artists like Donna Summer and Cher. She sought to capture elements of disco music and a sense of grandeur. For the project, she reunited with Mauro De Tommaso and Martín D'Agosto, her previous collaborators. Although the initial sessions leaned toward a more irreverent sound, the team ultimately chose to blend Argentine rock with the signature pop style that defined Lali's music, marking a shift from their original sonic direction.

In May 2024, Lali was invited by Cachorro López of Los Abuelos de la Nada to collaborate on a reimagined version of their 1983 song "Mil Horas". When asked by TMH about the seventies-inspired music video, Lali discussed the direction she wanted to take with the album: "[The clip] ties in with a look and a musical exploration that wasn't initially planned, but it amazingly fits with the album I'm working on. This album is deeply rooted in the essence of Argentine rock. Even though I usually make pop music with electronic and dance influences, in this sixth album, we're incorporating sounds and elements from the seventies and eighties."

In another interview, Lali was asked what Argentine rock meant to her as a pop artist, to which she replied: "For me, rock is the essence of being Argentine. It's more than just a musical genre; it's how we Argentines connect with each other. It's my bond with my friends, my mom, and myself. Whenever I choose what to listen to, I always go for what touches my soul the most—our national rock artists and certain songs that feel like a refuge when things get crazy or when I want to feel something deeply again," and added: "I'm working on my sixth album, which has a strong identity rooted in national rock. Although I'm a pop artist, I think the genre I work in is very generous because it allows for a lot of openness. It lets me bring in elements from other genres, whether it's electronic or rock—it gives me a lot of freedom to experiment".

Prior to its release, the album was featured on Rolling Stone's '15 Latin Albums We Can't Wait to Hear in 2025' list, which highlighted the year's most highly anticipated releases. The article noted that "after speaking out against President Javier Milei's rampant homophobia and class warfare, [Lali] harnessed the fiery political roots of rock nacional for the mocking, Pink-ish anthems "Fanático" and "No Me Importa"." It also mentioned that "recent guest spots on records from Dillom and Ca7riel & Paco Amoroso [had] fans salivating for Internet-breaking cameos." Additionally, it was said that among Argentina's "fleet of glitzy pop stars", Lali reigned as the "people's princess".

== Artistic direction ==
=== Title and concept ===
In an interview with Vogue, the album's creative director, Pablo Cerezo, explained that the concept revolved around defying expectations and embracing a rebellious attitude. According to Cerezo, the decision to choose a long title was intentional, as it resisted easy adaptation into a hashtag. In a separate interview, Lali offered her own interpretation of the title, noting its double meaning. She explained that it can be understood either as a warning against confronting something negative or, ironically, as an invitation to face challenges. For Lali, both interpretations carry value, as confronting difficulties can contribute to personal growth.

=== Artwork ===
The standard edition of the album, under the creative direction of Pablo Cerezo, features a provocative image of the singer. The cover shows a close-up of Lali's toned abdomen, wearing jeans and a leather belt with a central metal circle engraved with the album title and a star-shaped symbol. This symbol is a reinterpretation of the Sigil of Baphomet's inverted pentagram, modified to resemble a star with one less point. When deconstructed, it forms the word "Lali". The image also reveals a black fishnet bra with cutouts and rhinestones, matching the sparkling side straps of her underwear. The back cover follows the same aesthetic, showing a photo of the singer from behind, with the tracklist printed on a small patch on her jeans.

This is Lali's first studio album not to feature her face on the cover. Regarding this choice, Cerezo explained in an interview that "not showing her face is a rebellious act; today the industry demands the artist's face to sell, [so that's why] we decided to show Lali's torso instead of her face".

The album art has been the subject of analysis in various specialized media. Both Diego Mancusi from Rolling Stone and Julieta Otero from Vogue highlighted its visual influences. Mancusi noted that the artwork subtly references the cover of Madonna's Like a Prayer (1989), while Otero pointed to similarities with Sticky Fingers (1971) by The Rolling Stones and also Like a Prayer, emphasizing the pop and sensual details that reminisce of the latter. Joaquín Bahamonde from Infobae also observed that the star symbol evokes Madonna's aesthetic and commented that "it shows how the singer appropriates elements of pop culture to redefine and adapt them to her own vision".

== Music and lyrics ==
No Vayas a Atender Cuando el Demonio Llama is a bold, conceptual work that dismantles media narratives, reclaims public identity, and confronts desire, shame, politics, and pop culture with irony and self-awareness. Through its fifteen tracks, Lali navigates personal history and public scrutiny while affirming her own artistic autonomy.

=== Songs ===
The album opens with "Popstar", a biting satire where Lali adopts a children's TV show tone to mock the exaggerated media image built around her. With sarcastic lines and cartoonish sound effects, she introduces herself as a "pop villain" who amuses fans, irritates haters, and thrives on public contradiction. This playful mood quickly gives way to nostalgia in "Lokura" (transl. "madness"), a vivid tribute to Pablo "Locura" Villanueva, her first childhood crush who was a wheelchair-using local legend from her neighborhood. The track blends erotic fascination and innocence, drawing from real memories of growing up in Parque Patricios and anchoring the album in deeply personal territory.

That sense of identity carries into "No Me Importa" (transl. "I don't care"), an empowering anthem in which Lali refuses to bend under public pressure. The song acts as a direct response to political attacks she faced, notably from Argentine president Javier Milei, affirming her right to speak out, evolve, and be unapologetically herself. The next track, "Plástico" (transl. "plastic"), featuring rapper Duki, expands on this defiance. Here, Lali critiques superficial fame and industry hypocrisy with retro-futurist beats and the key line that gives the album its title: "No vayas a atender cuando el demonio llama". It's a reference to the way society fabricates enemies, turning artists like her into lightning rods for controversy. Both tracks assert that authenticity is more threatening, and more powerful, than any carefully packaged version of celebrity.

"Tu Novia II" (transl. "your girlfriend II") brings back the queer seduction narrative from her 2018 song "Tu Novia", but this time, with more confidence and directness. Lali now addresses a woman directly, declaring her desire without apology, while cleverly nodding to the 2003 song "Y Qué" by Babasónicos and her own past track "2 Son 3". Then comes "Morir de Amor" (transl. "to die of love"), a sweeping, bittersweet ballad featuring vocals by legendary Argentine band Bersuit Vergarabat. The track explores the hesitation of falling in love again after heartbreak, a rare moment of romantic vulnerability that slows down the album's tempo and injects emotional depth.

The energy surges again in "Mejor Que Vos" (transl. "better than you"), a euphoric collaboration with electropop duo Miranda! that celebrates moving on from a toxic relationship. Framed with playful synths and dramatic flair, the song reframes heartbreak as a moment of triumph. From there, "No Hay Héroes" (transl. "there are no heroes"), which Lali co-wrote with Julieta Venegas, turns contemplative. It strips away the pop armor to reflect on the ambiguity of life's moral categories, declaring there are no heroes or villains—only people navigating chaos and uncertainty. Its spiritual message ("God is our siblings") resonates as a subtle, secular call for solidarity.

At the album's midpoint, "Sensacional Éxito" (transl. "sensational hit") marks a turning point. In this spoken interlude voiced by actor Eduardo Colombo, media clichés about Lali, such as "the ultimate heroine" or "the biggest delinquent ever remembered", are laid bare in absurd hyperbole. It's a parody of how fame distorts, exaggerates, and commodifies, and it cleverly bookends the satirical tone set in the opening track.

From here, the album plunges into themes of eroticism, obsession, and power. "Sexy" is a sultry club track about raw, immediate desire: bodies moving before making it to the bed, heat rising in public, a world where even sex becomes performance. "Fanático" (transl. "fanatic") flips the lens toward the obsessive critic: Lali sings about a man who pretends to dislike her but secretly consumes everything she does. The message is sharp: her enemies are often her biggest fans—and it responds directly to real-life political backlash by turning ridicule into pop currency. The song stood up for directly addressing the dismissive remarks and political persecution led and encouraged by President Milei, framing him as a fan obsessed with her. It was conceived after Fito Páez advised Lali that her battlefield should be her art.

The mood shifts again in "Perdedor" (transl. "loser"), a stripped-down breakup song about always betting on the wrong person. Lali's voice takes center stage in this melancholic ballad, reflecting on regret and emotional wear. Then, in "33", she embraces maturity. Collaborating with alt-pop artist Dillom, she contemplates aging, purpose, and loss, rejecting the fear of growing older in favor of clarity and agency. "I used to chase hits", she sings, "now I make classics".

"Pendeja" (transl. "brat") flips societal criticism on its head. Long used as a derogatory term for a reckless or immature woman, the word becomes Lali's battle cry. Through punky production and repetition, she embraces her reputation as a "troublemaker", showing that agency over language is itself a form of power. Her mother Majo Riera's voice appears in the track, saying "Lali, you're too old for this", only to be absorbed into the song's joyful refusal to grow tame.

The album ends with "Fin de Transmisión" (transl. "end of broadcast"), a spoken outro delivered by queer comedian and radio host Evelyn Botto. It signs off the record with absurdity, sarcasm, and gratitude: "We hope you play it until your families hate you". It's a tongue-in-cheek farewell that closes the album's cycle of irony, self-mythology, and cultural resistance.

== Critical reception ==
Professional ratings
Review scores
Source	Rating
Caderno Pop	88/100
Clarín	Favorable
La Nación	Favorable
La Voz del Interior	Very Good

The album received widespread acclaim from music critics, many of whom praised its bold artistic direction and sonic maturity. Sebastián Espósito of La Nación called it Lali's most mature and personal album to date, describing it as "her most Lali record" and portraying her as "witty, sensual, and fun". He also pointed to influences from Charly García and highlighted what he termed a "saynomorean energy" throughout the tracklist. Similarly, Lucas Terrazas of Infobae described it as "an album with a powerful sonic identity and lyrics that explore the dark, the sensual, and the uncomfortable without filters", with "33" standing out as a highlight.

Other reviewers echoed these sentiments. Brenda Petrone Veliz of La Voz del Interior emphasized the 1980s-inspired sound and national rock influences, noting a production that is "acidic, ironic, uncomfortable, and bold". Marcelo Fernández Bitar from Clarín observed a shift in sound and attitude, with pop taking on a more rock-influenced and rebellious edge, while David Guillán of Tiempo Argentino praised the mix of electronic and pop elements, the "explosive collaborations", and the album's underlying message of resistance. For Jota B. Ponsone of Página 12, the project reveals Lali's artistic maturity, calling it her strongest effort in terms of music, lyrics, and composition.

The album's ambition and cohesiveness were also widely recognized. Yanet Ingravallo of TN saw it as a "challenging" turning point in Lali's career, while Lucía Riva Palacio Smith of Rolling Stone noted that the collaborations enhance its personality and praised the three interludes as key components. Priscila Bertozzi from Latin Pop Brasil went as far as to call it "the masterpiece of her career". Rocío Pascal of RedBoing highlighted how Lali "reveals her most human side", describing the album as "a personal diary disguised as pop music". Lourdes Maidana of Indie Club praised the album's concept and the musicians' contributions, which she said bring "a fresh and experimental texture" that "breaks every structure within her musical world and reinvents itself". Macarena Liguori from Vía País emphasized the fusion of genres, from pop to rock, noting that each track contributes to a cohesive, energetic identity. Likewise, Samantha Plaza Monroy of Big Bang News concluded that the album affirms freedom, celebrates friendship, and reconnects with Argentine musical roots while promoting collective joy and resistance.

Although most of the reception was positive, a few critics offered more tempered views. Celine Albornoz from Diario Río Negro acknowledged the creative risks taken and called it Lali's best album to date, though she pointed out imperfections in tracks like "Plástico", "Tu Novia II", and "No Me Importa", which, in her view, don't seriously compromise the whole. More critically, Noelia Maldonado from La Voz del Interior applauded Lali's work ethic and ambition but felt the album sometimes leans too heavily on predictable or familiar formulas, especially within a national context rich in rock heritage and innovation.

=== Year-end lists ===
Select year-end rankings
Publication	List	Rank	Ref.
Billboard Argentina	The 50 Albums that Defined 2025	—N/a	
Clarín	The Best Argentine Albums of 2025	—N/a	
Indie Club	The 20 Albums of 2025	16	
Rolling Stone en Español	The Best Argentine Albums of 2025	9	

== Commercial performance ==
In Argentina, No Vayas a Atender Cuando el Demonio Llama debuted directly at number one on the Argentine Albums chart within just two days of tracking, marking the sixth time Lali had achieved this position with an album. The album went on to spend eleven weeks at number one. It also caused a notable resurgence of her fifth studio album, Lali (2023), which re-entered the chart at number four. On 7 July 2025, No Vayas a Atender Cuando el Demonio Llama became the female Argentine album with the most weeks at number one on the physical albums chart in the 2020s, surpassing the previous record set by Lali in 2023, which had spent six consecutive weeks at number one upon release. On 18 August 2025, the album was back at the top of the chart for an eighth week, becoming the Argentine album with the most weeks at number one of the decade. In December 2025, the album re-entered the chart at number two after the release of the vinyl LP version. In January 2026, it was revealed that No Vayas a Atender Cuando el Demonio Llama had been the best-selling Argentine album of 2025.

After Lali's sold-out shows at the Mâs Monumental Stadium on 6 and 7 June 2026, the album re-entered the Argentine Albums chart at number two. The following week, it climbed to the top spot for an eleventh non-consecutive week overall, extending its record as the Argentine album with the most weeks at number one during the 2020s.

Following its release, No Vayas a Atender Cuando el Demonio Llama had a significant impact on the singles charts, with six songs entering the Billboard Argentina Hot 100. Additionally, the reimagined version of Turf's "Loco Un Poco" experienced a rise of eleven positions compared to the previous week, causing Lali to have a total of seven songs simultaneously on the chart, marking a major achievement in her career.

In September 2025, the album received a gold certification by the Argentine Chamber of Phonograms and Videograms Producers (CAPIF) for selling over 10,000 copies in Argentina. As regards its singles, "Fanático" received a platinum certification, while "Mejor Que Vos" and "Plástico" were also certified gold. Three months later, the album received a platinum certification for the 20,000 copies sold in the country.

== Awards and nominations ==
Awards and nominations for No Vayas A Atender Cuando El Demonio Llama
Year	Organization	Award	Result	Ref.
2026	Video Music Awards	Long Format Video	Won	
2026	Video Music Awards	Best Creative Direction	Nominated	
2026	Gardel Awards	Album of the Year	Nominated	
2026	Gardel Awards	Best Pop Album	Won	
2026	Gardel Awards	Best Long Form Music Video	Nominated	

== Track listing ==
Track listing adapted from Spotify and Tidal. All tracks were produced by Mauro De Tommaso and Don Barreto except where noted.

No Vayas a Atender Cuando el Demonio Llama track listing
No.	Title	Writer(s)	Producer(s)	Length
1.	"Popstar"	Mariana Espósito; Mauro De Tommaso; Martin D'Agosto; Isabela Teran Lieban; Juan Giménez Kuj	Mauro De Tommaso	1:08
2.	"Lokura"	Espósito; De Tommaso; D'Agosto; Teran Lieban; Giménez Kuj; Federico Barreto		2:29
3.	"No Me Importa"	Espósito; De Tommaso; D'Agosto; Teran Lieban; Barreto		2:33
4.	"Plástico" (with Duki)	Espósito; De Tommaso; D'Agosto; Teran Lieban; Giménez Kuj; Barreto; Mauro Lombardo		2:59
5.	"Tu Novia II"	Espósito; De Tommaso; D'Agosto; Teran Lieban; Giménez Kuj; Barreto; Adrian Rodríguez; Mariano Domínguez		2:24
6.	"Morir de Amor"	Espósito; De Tommaso; D'Agosto; Teran Lieban; Giménez Kuj; Barreto		3:37
7.	"Mejor Que Vos" (with Miranda!)	Espósito; De Tommaso; D'Agosto; Alejandro Sergi		2:46
8.	"No Hay Héroes"	Espósito; Terán Lieban; Julieta Venegas		2:27
9.	"Sensacional Éxito"	Espósito; De Tommaso; Giménez Kuj	Mauro De Tommaso	0:46
10.	"Sexy"	Espósito; De Tommaso; D'Agosto; Teran Lieban; Giménez Kuj; Barreto; Julieta Aylén Ordorica		2:38
11.	"Fanático"	Espósito; De Tommaso; D'Agosto; Teran Lieban; Giménez Kuj; Barreto		2:42
12.	"Perdedor"	Espósito; De Tommaso; D'Agosto; Teran Lieban; Giménez Kuj; Barreto		3:41
13.	"33" (with Dillom)	Espósito; De Tommaso; Barreto; Teran Lieban; Giménez Kuj; Dylan León Masa; Mariano Napoli		3:44
14.	"Pendeja"	Espósito; De Tommaso; D'Agosto; Teran Lieban; Giménez Kuj; Barreto; Mariano Napoli		2:50
15.	"Fin de Transmisión"	Espósito; De Tommaso; Giménez Kuj	Mauro De Tommaso	0:43
Total length:				37:27

No Vayas a Atender Cuando el Demonio Llama II track listing
No.	Title	Writer(s)	Producer(s)	Length
10.	"Payaso"	Espósito; De Tommaso; D'Agosto; Teran Lieban; Giménez Kuj; Barreto		2:11
17.	"Fanático" (Live)	Espósito; De Tommaso; D'Agosto; Teran Lieban; Giménez Kuj; Barreto	De Tommaso; Don Barreto; Tomas Heredia; Juan Giménez Kuj	4:39
Total length:				44:17

=== Notes ===
- All track titles are stylized in all caps.
- "Plástico" samples "No Me Dejan Salir" by Charly García.
- "Tu Novia II" contains an interpolation of "¿Y Qué?" by Babasónicos.
- "Morir de Amor" samples "A One Two" by Biz Markie.
- "Morir de Amor" features vocals by Germán Sbarbati and Daniel Suárez of Bersuit Vergarabat.
- Though credited to Lali, "Sensacional Éxito" and "Fin de Transmisión" are spoken interludes by Eduardo Colombo and Evelyn Botto, respectively.
- No Vayas a Atender Cuando el Demonio Llama II lists "Payaso" in between "Sensacional Éxito" and "Sexy".

== Charts ==
Weekly chart performance for No Vayas a Atender Cuando el Demonio Llama
Chart (2025)	Peak position
Argentine Albums (CAPIF)	1

== Certifications ==
Certifications for No Vayas a Atender Cuando el Demonio Llama
Region	Certification	Certified units/sales
Argentina (CAPIF)	Platinum	20,000^{^}
^{^} Shipments figures based on certification alone.

== Release history ==
Release formats for No Vayas a Atender Cuando el Demonio Llama
Region	Date	Format(s)	Edition	Label
Various	29 April 2025	Digital download; streaming	Standard	Sony Music Argentina
Argentina	9 May 2025	CD	Standard	Sony Music Argentina
Uruguay	9 May 2025	CD	Standard	Sony Music Argentina
Various	26 November 2025	Digital download; streaming	II	Sony Music Argentina
Argentina	28 November 2025	Vinyl LP	II	Sony Music Argentina
Uruguay	28 November 2025	Vinyl LP	II	Sony Music Argentina

== Personnel ==
Musicians

- Lali – lead vocals
- Duki – lead vocals (track 4)
- Ale Sergi – lead vocals (track 7), keyboards (track 7)
- Juliana Gattas – lead vocals (track 7)
- Dillom – lead vocals (track 13)
- Mauro De Tommaso – drums (track 1, 5–7, 9–10, 12, 14), background vocals (tracks 1, 3), guitar (tracks 2–4, 6, 10–14), keyboards (tracks 2–3, 5–7, 11–15), bass guitar (track 7, 13)
- Juan Giménez Kuj – keyboards (tracks 1–2, 9, 11–15), bass guitar (tracks 2, 5–7, 10, 12, 14), guitar (tracks 3, 6, 8, 10–11)
- Federico Barreto – keyboards (tracks 2–3, 5–7, 11–14), background vocals (track 3), drums (track 4, 10)
- Martín D'Agosto – background vocals (tracks 1–6, 11–14)
- BB Asul – background vocals (tracks 1–6, 11–14)
- Germán Sbarbati – background vocals (track 6)
- Daniel Suárez – background vocals (track 6)
- Guillermo Salort – drums (tracks 2–3, 11, 13–14)
- Santiago Napoli – guitar (tracks 2, 4, 7, 12–14)
- Eduardo Colombo – spoken word vocals (track 9)
- Evelyn Botto – spoken word vocals (track 15)
- Francisco Gómez Lado – scratching (track 6)
- Alejandro Terán – strings (track 12–13)
- Javier Casalla – strings (track 12–13)
- Julio Domínguez – strings (track 12–13)
- Karmen Rencar – strings (track 12–13)

Technical

- Dave Kutch – mastering (tracks 1–15)
- Lewis Pickett – mixing (tracks 1–15)
- Mauro De Tommaso – engineering (tracks 1–15)
- Federico Barreto – engineering (tracks 2–8, 11–14)
- Isabel Rodríguez Siblesz – mixing assistance (tracks 1–10, 15)

== See also ==
- Lali Tour 2025
