= Connor Questa discography =

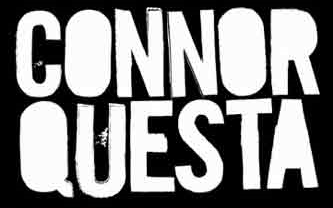
- Studio albums: 2
- EPs: 1
- Singles: 9
- Video albums: 7

Connor Questa discography or its inception, originally called as Marilina Connor Questa; a group of originating alternative rock of Buenos Aires, active between 2010 and 2015, Argentina has an EP, two albums of study, nine singles and seven official promotional video.

== Studio albums ==
| Year | Studio albums | Songs |
|---|---|---|
| 2011 | Somos por partes: First studio album; Released: November 17, 2011; Label: MCL Records | "Huesos", "Acorde de paso", "Sublow", "Pasiones", "Acoples", "Amnesia", "Gritos", "Resiste en pie", "Hurto", "Tripolar", "Respect", "Demo resistente" |
| 2013 | Fuego al universo: Second studio album; Released: March 15, 2013; Label: MCL Records | "Todo lo posible", "Pensar bien", "Lo roto expone", "Hoy decido que", "De más", "Alma y sangre", "Cliché", "Tantos mares", "Fido", "Ya no hay", "FAP" |

== Extended plays ==
| Year | EP | Songs |
|---|---|---|
| 2010 | Marilina Connor Questa: Discográfica: MCL Records | "Si no ves", "Amnesia", "Lo roto expone", "Resiste en pie" |

== Singles ==
| Year | Single | Label |
|---|---|---|
| 2010 | "Acorde de paso", "Resiste en pie" | Independiente |
| 2011 | "Amnesia", "Gritos", "Acorde de paso", "Pasiones" | MCL Records |
| 2013 | "Tripolar", "Pensar bien", "Cliché" | MCL Records |

== Videography ==
| Year | Video clip | Label |
|---|---|---|
| 2011 | "Amnesia", "Gritos", "Acorde de paso", "Pasiones" | MCL Records |
| 2013 | "Tripolar", "Pensar bien", "Cliché" | MCL Records |
