= No Me Importa =

2024 single by Lali

Single by Lali

from the album No Vayas a Atender Cuando El Demonio Llama
- English title: "I Don't Care"
- Released: 26 November 2024
- Genre: Pop rock; pop-punk; punk rock
- Length: 2:33
- Label: Sony Argentina
- Songwriters: Mariana Espósito; Martin D'Agosto; Mauro De Tommaso; Isabela Teran Lieban; Federico Barreto
- Producers: Mauro De Tommaso; Don Barreto

Lali singles chronology
"Fanático" (2024)	"No Me Importa" (2024)	"Mejor Que Vos" (2025)

Music video
- "No Me Importa" on YouTube

"No Me Importa" (transl. "I Don't Care") is a song recorded by Argentine singer Lali. It was released through Sony Music Argentina on 26 November 2024 as the second single from her sixth studio album, No Vayas a Atender Cuando El Demonio Llama (2025). The song was co-written by Lali, Galán, BB Asul, and its producers, Mauro De Tommaso and Don Barreto.

== Background and release ==
Background and Release In October 2024, Lali gave an interview to Agustín Gómez Cascales for Shangay, during which she discussed, among other topics, the production process of "Fanático" and her upcoming sixth studio album. In the interview, she teased that the album would feature some collaborations and, in terms of sound, would include songs ranging from "mega-electronic" to punk.

A week before the song's release, a video from Lali's 33rd birthday party began circulating on social media, featuring a portion of the track, leaking part of the song. Shortly after, Lali posted the video on her TikTok account with the caption "Y no me importa" (transl. "and I don't care"), suggesting that she wasn't bothered by the leak. The phrase later turned out to be the title of the song.

On Monday, 25 November 2024, Lali took to the streets of Buenos Aires to promote the upcoming single, riding through the city on convertible car with a megaphone. She wore a white t-shirt with the phrase "Nunca fui lo que querían de mí" (transl. "I've never been what they wanted from me"), which was also a lyric from the song. The track was officially released the following day, November 26.

== Music and lyrics ==
"No Me Importa" has a duration of two minutes and thirty-three seconds. It was written by Lali, along with Martín D'Agosto and Mauro De Tommaso, with whom she had previously collaborated on the songs for her 2023 album Lali. The track was also written by BB Asul and Don Barreto. The production was handled by De Tommaso and Barreto, who also contributed as instrumentalists, playing guitar, electric bass, and keyboards. Additionally, Barreto provided backing vocals and played keyboards. Juan Giménez Kuj and Guillermo Salort joined the team as musicians, playing guitar and drums, respectively. The track was mastered by Dave Kutch, and Lewis Pickett was responsible for the mixing.

Musically, "No Me Importa" blends rock and pop rock with influences of pop punk and punk rock. The instrumental backdrop is described as "full of distortion and a rebellious energy", according to Candela Mazzone of Infobae.

== Critical reception ==
Andrea Romero of Los 40 highlighted Lali's personal and artistic experimentation in her new song, describing the lyrics as a "manifesto of rebellion". Priscila Bertozzi from the Brazilian portal Latin Pop praised the track for helping Lali establish herself as "a cultural and generational icon, transcending labels like pop or rock". Candela Mazzone of Infobae noted that the song evokes the essence of Argentine rock, drawing comparisons to bands like Babasónicos and Intoxicados. She also considered it a tribute to the "Ramone-style" scream, incorporating elements of punk rock.

Julián Otal Landi from Agencia Paco Uriondo commended Lali's decision to move away from the current trend of urban artists revisiting rock in a nostalgic but passionless way. He praised her for "swimming against the current" and approaching rock in a way that is both authentic and personal.

In the article "Opposing Views" in La Voz del Interior, two music critics expressed contrasting opinions on "No Me Importa". Diego Tabachnik praised the song and appreciated Lali's musical exploration, emphasizing her ability to innovate. In contrast, Noelia Maldonado criticized the lack of coherence in Lali's musical output, labeling the single as "a mediocre song", with a sound that evokes artists like Pink or Avril Lavigne, offering little in terms of innovation.

== Music video ==
The music video for "No Me Importa", directed by Lali and Lautaro Espósito, premiered on her YouTube channel on 28 November 2024. Filming took place on the morning of 26 November, just hours before the song's release. During the shoot, Lali was seen riding in a convertible through the streets of Buenos Aires, accompanied by a film crew and security personnel. Later that afternoon, she shared the single's cover art on her Instagram stories, along with a link inviting a limited number of fans to join the video shoot at Arena Estudio, located behind Usina del Arte in the La Boca neighborhood.

The video begins with Lali driving along Corrientes Avenue in Buenos Aires. In the same shot, she is seen passing by other iconic landmarks and areas such as the Obelisco, Puerto Madero, and La Boca, all from the back of the convertible, singing into a megaphone. In the next scene, Lali steps onto an outdoor stage set up on the street to perform the song, backed by an all-female band, in front of an enthusiastic crowd waving flags, jumping, and even moshing. Toward the end of the video, Lali leaps into the arms of the crowd, who pass her around while an overhead shot captures the moment.

== Personnel ==
- Lali – vocals, songwriter
- Mauro De Tommaso – songwriter, background vocals, producer, guitar, keyboards, electric bass
- Don Barreto – songwriter, background vocals, producer, keyboards
- Juan Giménez Kuj – songwriter, guitar, keyboards, recording engineer
- Martín D'Agosto – songwriter, background vocals
- BB Asul – songwriter
- Guillermo Salort – drums
- Dave Kutch – mastering
- Lewis Pickett – mixing

== Charts ==
=== Weekly charts ===
Weekly chart performance for "No Me Importa"
Chart (2024)	Peak position
Argentina Hot 100 (Billboard)	43
Argentina Airplay (Monitor Latino)	5
Argentina Latin Airplay (Monitor Latino)	5
Argentina National Songs (Monitor Latino)	3
Uruguay Pop Airplay (Monitor Latino)	15

=== Year-end charts ===
2025 year-end chart performance for "No Me Importa"
Chart (2025)	Position
Argentina Airplay (Monitor Latino)	40
Argentina Pop Airplay (Monitor Latino)	19
Uruguay Pop Airplay (Monitor Latino)	95
