= Adiós Sui Generis =

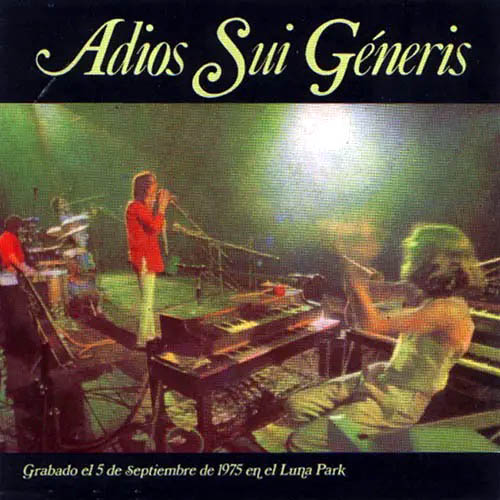

Live album by Sui Generis
- Released: 1975
- Recorded: 5 September 1975
- Genre: Folk rock

Sui Generis chronology
Pequeñas anécdotas sobre las instituciones (1974)	Adiós Sui Generis (1975)	Adiós Sui Generis, Parte 2 (1995)

Adiós Sui Generis (Goodbye Sui Generis) is a live album by Argentine folk rock group Sui Generis, recorded during the last show given by the band, on September 5, 1975, at the Luna Park.

== Track listing ==
1. "Instituciones" (Institutions) (García)
2. "La fuga del paralítico" (The Escape of the Paralytic) (García)
3. "Natalio Ruiz" (García, Piégari)
4. "Confesiones de invierno" (Winter Confessions) (García)
5. "Canción para mi muerte" (Song for My Death) (García)
6. "La niña juega en el gran jardín" (The Girl Plays in the Great Garden) (Rafanelli)
7. "Zapando con la gente" (Jamming With the People) (García)
8. "Aprendizaje" (Learning) (García)
9. "Un hada, un cisne" (A Fairy, a Swan) (García)
10. "Pequeñas delicias de la vida conyugal" (Small Delights of the Spousal Life) (García)
11. "Tango en segunda" (García)
12. "Rasguña las piedras" (Scratch the Stones) (García)
13. "Blues del levante" (Hook Up Blues) (García)
