= Mejor Que Vos =

2025 single by Lali and Miranda!

Single by Lali and Miranda!

from the album No Vayas a Atender Cuando El Demonio Llama
- English title: "Better Than You"
- Released: 6 February 2025
- Genre: Pop; electropop
- Length: 2:47
- Label: Sony Argentina
- Songwriters: Mariana Espósito; Alejandro Sergi; Martin D'Agosto; Mauro De Tommaso
- Producers: Mauro De Tommaso; Don Barreto

Lali singles chronology
"No Me Importa" (2024)	"Mejor Que Vos" (2025)	"Loco Un Poco" (2025)

Miranda! singles chronology
"Por Ese Hombre" (2025)	"Mejor Que Vos" (2025)	"Triste" (2025)

Music video
- "Mejor Que Vos" on YouTube

"Mejor Que Vos" (transl. "Better Than You") is a song recorded by Argentine singer Lali and Argentine duo Miranda!. It was released through Sony Music Argentina on 6 February 2025 as the third single from Lali's sixth studio album, No Vayas a Atender Cuando El Demonio Llama (2025). The song was co-written by Lali, Ale Sergi, Galán, and Mauro De Tommaso, while the production was in charge of De Tommaso and Don Barreto.

"Mejor Que Vos" marks Lali and Miranda!'s second collaboration and their first original track together, following the reimagined version of "Yo Te Diré" featured on the duo's 2023 album, Hotel Miranda!.

== Background and release ==
Lali and Miranda! made their first live performance together on 10 November 2017 at the Luna Park Stadium in Buenos Aires, as part of the second date of the Lali en Vivo tour. During this concert, the artists performed the song "Irresistible," from second studio album, Soy (2016). Two months later, on 30 January 2018, they shared the stage once again at a free concert led by the Argentine duo in Mar del Plata, where they performed "Ritmo y Decepción" and "Enamorada", in addition to repeating their performance of "Irresistible". Later, during the 22nd edition of the Premios Gardel, held virtually on 18 September 2020 due to the COVID-19 pandemic, they delivered a rendition of the classic "Tu Amor," originally recorded by Charly García and Pedro Aznar for the album Tango 4 (1991).

After years of live collaborations, the two artists joined forces on their first joint musical production in 2023. This collaboration resulted in a new version of the song "Yo Te Diré", originally included in Miranda!'s second studio album, Sin Restricciones (2004). The track was featured on Hotel Miranda! (2023), an album that brought together artists from various generations and genres to reimagine several of the duo's pop classics. However, this wasn't the first time they worked together in a recording studio. In a 2015 interview, Ale Sergi revealed that Lali had visited his studio, and they had sung together, although they hadn't written any songs at that point. Sergi expressed admiration for Lali and shared his desire to collaborate with her in the future. That year, Lali released the Esperanza Mía soundtrack, which included "El Ritmo del Momento", a song written by Sergi.

Shortly after announcing the release of her single "Fanático" (2024), Lali gave an interview to Shangay, in which she discussed the production process of the single and her sixth studio album. In the interview, Lali talked about the musical genres that might be featured on the album and confirmed future collaborations, marking her return to collaborative work since her fourth studio album, Libra (2020). In a later interview in January 2025, journalist Leila Guerriero from El País revealed some details about the album, mentioning possible tracks that might be included, such as "Lokura", "Libertad", and "Mejor Que Vos".

Finally, on 4 February 2025, Lali surprised her fans by announcing on her social media that her new song would be released as the third single from her album, just two days after the announcement. Along with the news, she shared a preview of the music video, where the artists could be seen dressed in a vintage style inspired by the aesthetics of the 1970s and 1980s, reminiscent of ABBA and David Bowie.

== Music and lyrics ==
"Mejor Que Vos" is a pop and electropop song with elements of disco music. It was written by Lali along with Ale Sergi, Martín D'Agosto, and Mauro De Tommaso, while the production was handled by De Tommaso in collaboration with Don Barreto.

Regarding the writing and recording process, Ale Sergi explained that they initially started meeting with the goal of composing together in the studio. Months later, Lali and De Tommaso contacted him to invite him to join the song as a guest artist with Miranda!. On her part, Lali revealed that when they began discussing the theme of the song, she initially wanted to explore the pain of a broken heart. However, the concept evolved when they decided to focus on a powerful love that healed and illuminated. She also mentioned that collaborating with the Argentine duo on a song of her own was the realization of a dream and a "personal whim" she had always had.

== Critical reception ==
Lucas Terrazas from Infobae noted that the song "combines Lali's charisma with the freshness and talent of Ale Sergi and Juliana Gattas", highlighting the singer's versatility and ability to blend different musical genres without losing her artistic essence. Martín Sanzano from Rolling Stone described the song as "an eighties-inspired single with a catchy chorus, destined to become a hit". Azul Ingratta from MSN called the collaboration "explosive" and labeled the song "a new classic of Spanish-language pop".

Additionally, the Brazilian website Latin Pop Brasil selected the song as the best release of the week, praising its 90s pop sound that combined nostalgia with modernity.

== Charts ==
=== Weekly charts ===
Weekly chart performance for "Mejor Que Vos"
Chart (2025)	Peak position
Argentina Hot 100 (Billboard)	14
Argentina Airplay (Monitor Latino)	1
Argentina Latin Airplay (Monitor Latino)	1
Argentina National Songs (Monitor Latino)	1
Paraguay Pop (Monitor Latino)	12
Uruguay (Monitor Latino)	7
Uruguay Pop (Monitor Latino)	2

=== Year-end charts ===
2025 year-end chart performance for "Mejor Que Vos"
Chart (2025)	Position
Argentina Airplay (Monitor Latino)	4
Argentina Pop Airplay (Monitor Latino)	2
Bolivia Airplay (Monitor Latino)	88
Bolivia Pop Airplay (Monitor Latino)	45
Paraguay Pop Airplay (Monitor Latino)	99
Uruguay Airplay (Monitor Latino)	16
Uruguay Pop Airplay (Monitor Latino)	6

== Certifications ==
Region	Certification	Certified units/sales
Argentina (CAPIF)	Gold	10,000^{‡}
^{‡} Sales+streaming figures based on certification alone.
