= Connor Questa =

Rock band from Argentina

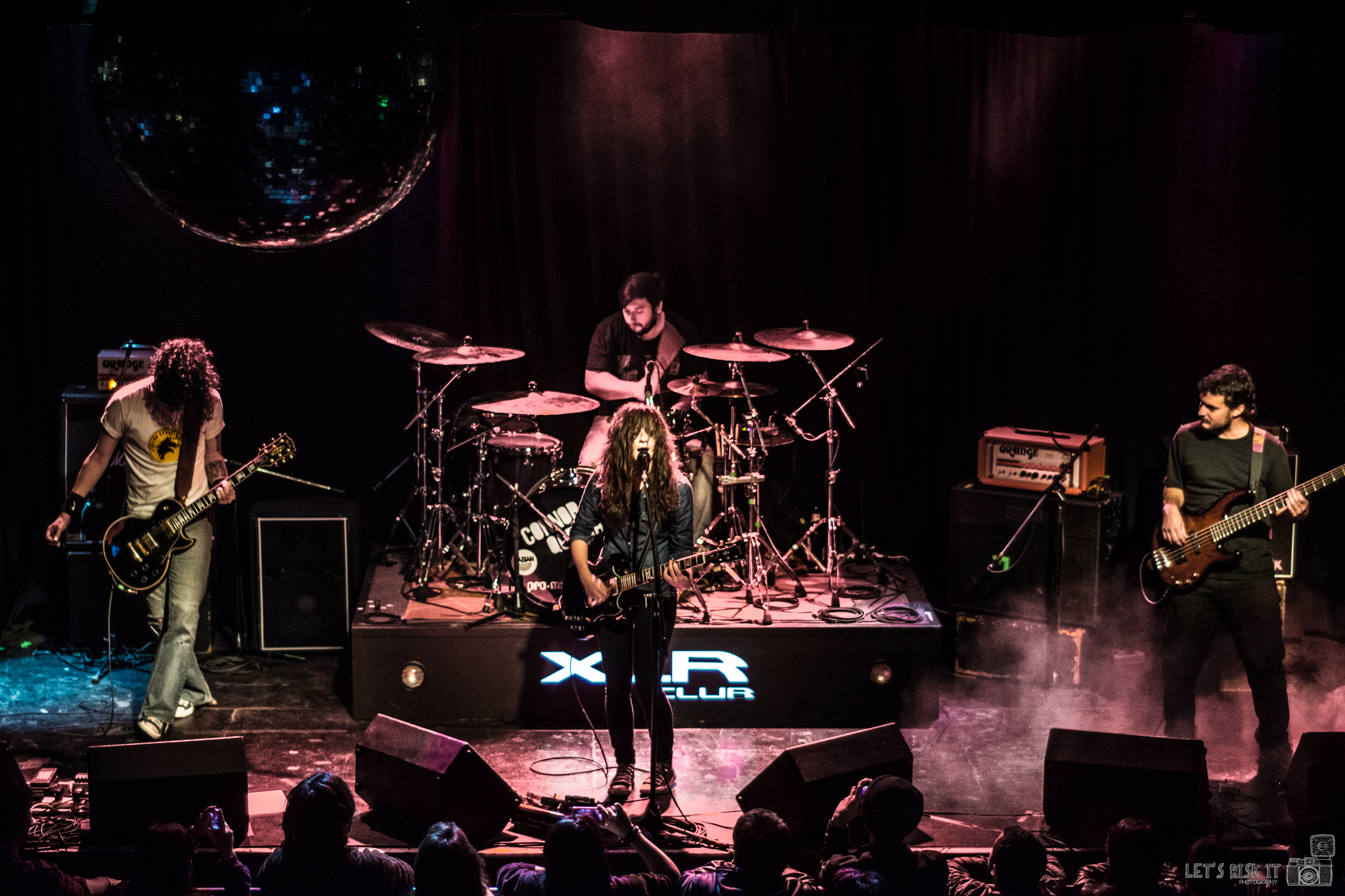
- Connor Questa in live, 2014

Background information
- Also known as: Marilina Connor Questa (early)
- Origin: Buenos Aires, Argentina
- Genres: Grunge; alternative rock; power pop; hard rock
- Years active: 2010–2015
- Members: Marilina Bertoldi (voice and guitar); Hernán Rúpolo (guitar); Agustín Agostinelli (drums); Santiago Jhones (bass)
- Past members: Rodrigo Bodaño (drums); Facundo Veloso (drums); Martin Casado (bass)

Connor Questa was a rock band from Argentina, formed in 2010 and dissolved in 2015. Throughout his career, only two albums released materials and their musical style was influenced by grunge, funk, heavy metal and soul. Early in his career, they are calling themselves "Marilina Connor Questa".

Marilina Bertoldi, began touring the City stages with her songs and her guitar solo format. After uploading several videos in Internet with records of visits, began the search for musicians to orchestrate those ideas that drew its particular voice. During the recording of their first EP, the band consolidated its power proposal and became a group project.

The band broke up in early 2015, by differences among its members.

== Discography ==
The band released only two albums:

- Marilina Connor Questa (EP) – 2010
- Somos por partes (We are by parts) – 2011
- Fuego al universo (Fire the universe) – 2013

== Singles ==
| Song | Album |
|---|---|
| Acorde de paso | Marilina Connor Questa (2010) |
| Resiste en pie | Marilina Connor Questa (2010) |
| Amnesia | We are in parts (2011) |
| Gritos | We are in parts (2011) |
| Acorde de paso (versión en estudio) | We are in parts (2011) |
| Pasiones | We are in parts (2011) |
| Tripolar | Fire the universe (2013) |
| Pensar bien | Fire the universe (2013) |
| Cliché | Fire the universe (2013) |

== See also ==
- Argentine rock
