= Sui Generis =

Argentine folk-rock band

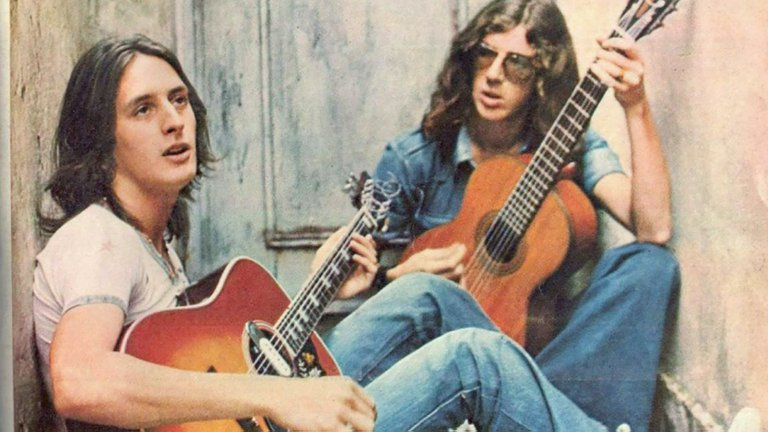
- Sui Generis in 1972. From left to right: Nito Mestre and Charly García

Background information
- Origin: Buenos Aires, Argentina
- Genres: Folk-rock; progressive rock; progressive folk; folk-pop
- Years active: 1971–1975; 1980; 2001
- Past members: Charly García; Nito Mestre; Rinaldo Rafanelli; Juan Rodríguez

Sui Generis was an influential folk-rock band from Argentina formed by musicians Charly García and Nito Mestre. Active during the first half of the 1970s, the band's success earned it a lasting following throughout South America.

The band's repertoire, composed and arranged in most part by García, went from their earlier, simple country-style guitar tunes that incorporated small elements of classical music (taking advantage of Garcia's conservatory training) to their more developed symphonic/prog rock sound of their later releases. Their youthful songs, a staple at sing-along gatherings, became an ingrained part of Argentina's cultural landscape.

Sui Generis disbanded on September 5, 1975, following a concert which was later published on video and as a separate record. Despite sporadic concerts in 1980 and 2001, there are no hints of a permanent re-formation of the band.

== Early years ==
Sui Generis was formed in 1969 from the merger of two bands: To Walk Spanish, originally led by Charly García and The Century Indignation, originally led by Nito Mestre. The newly formed band's members were Charly (piano), Nito (flute), Alberto Rodríguez (drums), Alejandro Correa (bass guitar) (later replaced by Rolando Fortich), Juan Carlos Bellia (guitar) and Carlos Piégari (guitar and vocals).

In its early life, Sui Generis experimented with psychedelic music but would eventually refine and change its sound and is now generally classified as folk-rock. Infamously, at Sui Generis' first big performance, none of the members but Charly and Nito appeared. Despite the poor showing, they went ahead with the show, García playing the piano, with Nito accompanying on the flute. Amazingly, the audience still loved them. García's simple songs of adolescence contained substantial poetic elements that showed through the limited instrumentation. After this they decided to continue as a duet with Charly composing songs and playing the piano, Nito playing the flute and both at vocals and guitar.

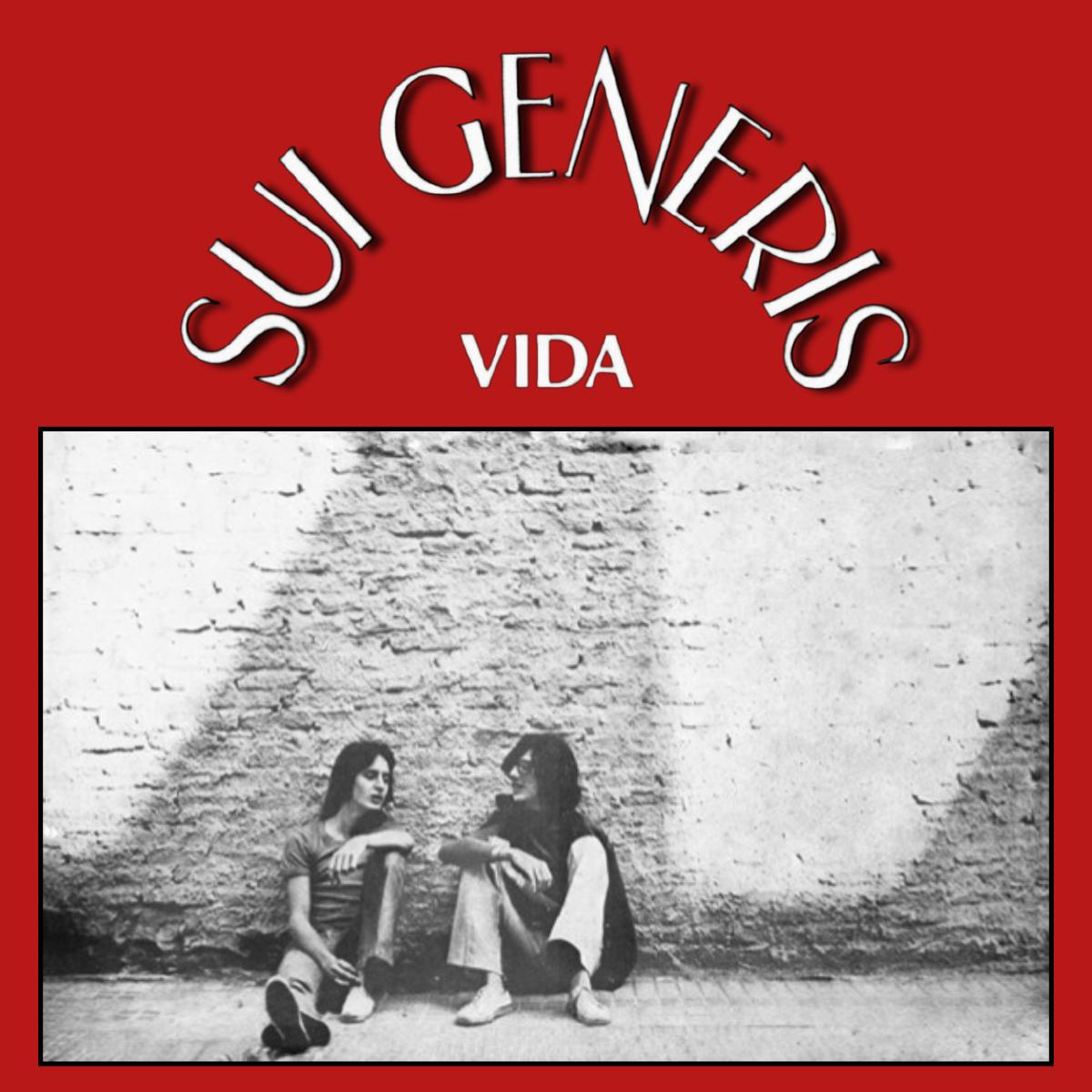
Cover of their first album "Vida" whose songs together with those of the second album became anthems for generations.

Soon after Sui Generis started to gain fame, García, then 20 years old, had to take a break from the band to fulfill his mandatory military service. Unhappy in the service, he pulled outrageous stunts, such as reportedly taking a corpse in a wheelchair for a walk in the sun because "he was too pale". Eventually, García swallowed a large dose of amphetamines and faked a heart attack, in an apparent attempt to cut short his military service. Garcia was hospitalized, and it was there that he composed two of the band's most famous songs: "Botas Locas" ("Crazy boots"), censored when first released, and "Canción para mi muerte" ("Song for my death"). Garcia was released from the military due to "mental health problems".

In 1972, Sui Generis released its first LP, Vida (Life), which became instantly popular, especially among Argentine teenagers. Confesiones de Invierno (Winter Confessions), their second LP, was released in 1973. This album had higher production values and better studio equipment and was also a huge commercial success.

== Change of direction ==
1974 was a turning point for Sui Generis: Charly was sick of "the piano and the flute" sound and decided that Sui Generis needed a change. He pursued a more traditional rock sound, with bass and drums, for which purpose he recruited Rinaldo Rafanelli and Juan Rodríguez respectively. The new album was originally titled Instituciones (Institutions), but Sui Generis' producer suggested they change the name to Pequeñas Anécdotas sobre las Instituciones (Little Anecdotes about the Institutions), reflecting the unstable nature of Argentine social and political institutions at the time. Charly's initial concept was to write a song for every influential traditional institution: the Catholic Church, the government, the family, the judicial system, the police, the Army, and so on. However, two songs, "Juan Represión" ("John Repression") about the police and military dictators (a specific reference to dictator Juan Carlos Onganía), and "Botas locas" ("Crazy Boots") about the army, were eliminated from the album by the music label, afraid of the growing political violence of the time. Two more had to be partly changed, "Las increíbles aventuras del Señor Tijeras" ("The incredible adventures of Mr. Scissors"), a song about the person in charge of film censorship at that time, and "¿Para quién canto yo entonces?" ("Who am I singing for, then?"), both about censorship itself, while "Música de Fondo para Cualquier Fiesta Animada", about the judiciary system had to be completely rewritten. Even though Charly achieved a different, more mature sound with Instituciones, the public rejected the change. They preferred the old folk-rock sound, and the album sold poorly.

In these years, Charly met María Rosa Yorio, who later bore his only son, Miguel García. Miguel released a solo album in December 2005 as Migue García.

== Há Sido ==
García kept composing songs through 1975 for an eventual new album which would be called Há sido (Has been). The name is a pun on ácido (acid), a reference to LSD. Later, Charly would say that the LP definitely referenced LSD, because the songs were about going to the sea and looking at the colorful fishes referred to an acid trip.

In 1975, Sui Generis' members began to have conflicts. "Nito" Mestre wasn't enthusiastic about the new style and project, the new members weren't accepted by the public, and Charly was tired of Sui Generis' old style, which the fans and producers wanted. The Há sido LP was never recorded, but some of the songs were included in the band's farewell live album, such as "Bubulina" and "Eiti Leda".

== Breakup ==
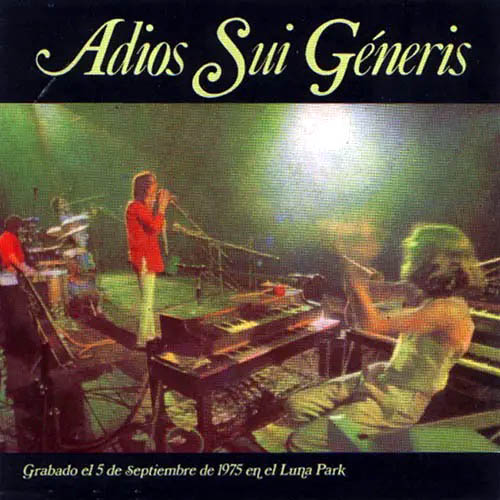
Cover of the double album "Adiós Sui Generis" registering their historical farewell concert in 1975.

Finally, on 5 September 1975, Sui Generis bid its final goodbye in the Luna Park Stadium, with two shows for 20,000 people, the biggest in the history of Argentine rock at the time. Many years later, Charly said that before the show he was going around the stadium, intimidated by the huge crowd. He claimed to have smoked 24 joints to calm his nerves. "In the 70s, weed was like a religious thing", he later commented. A double LP was released that year, recording the live shows: Adiós Sui Generis (Goodbye Sui Generis).

In 1976, Sui Generis recorded an LP with Argentine musicians León Gieco and Raúl Porchetto (whose music resembled Gieco's in a softer pop version) as well as María Rosa Yorio. The LP was called Porsuigieco (a mix of the names Raúl Porchetto, Sui Generis, León Gieco).

== Discography ==
Studio albums

- Vida (1972)
- Confesiones de invierno (1973)
- Pequeñas anécdotas sobre las instituciones (1974)
- Sinfonías para adolescentes (2000)

Live albums

- Adiós Sui Generis (1975)
- Adiós Sui Generis, parte II (1995)
- Adiós Sui Generis, parte III (1995)
- Si - Detrás de las paredes (2001)

Compilation albums

- Antología (1992)
