= Diario Río Negro =

Argentine daily newspaper

Río Negro

- January 23, 2019 front page of Rio Negro
- Type: Daily newspaper
- Format: Broadsheet
- Editor: Federico Aringoli
- Founded: 1912
- Political alignment: Liberal
- Language: Spanish
- Headquarters: General Roca, Río Negro
- Circulation: 45000 (Sundays)
- Website: rionegro.com.ar

Diario Rio Negro is an Argentine daily newspaper edited in General Roca, and published in the provinces of Río Negro, Neuquén, the south of La Pampa, the north of Chubut, the south of Buenos Aires Province and the City of Buenos Aires.

== History ==
The Rio Negro was founded on May 1, 1912 by Fernando Emilio Rajneri. At first the newspaper was published fortnightly but later weekly. Since 1958 the newspaper has circulated as a daily. An on-line version has been available since August 5, 1997.

The current chief executive of the newspaper, Julio Rajneri, is a son of the founder, and a former national Minister of Education, who served during Alfonsín's term of office.

== Style ==
Since its foundation, the newspaper has been very reader-focused. Its articles mostly address local and regional affairs. It was one of the few publications to criticise the military government (1976–1983), when it published articles about the kidnappings and other violations of human rights during that period.
