= Maggie Cullen =

Argentine singer

- Born: Magdalena Cullen; 8 August 2000 (age 25); Buenos Aires, Argentina
- Occupation: Singer
- Years active: 2021–present
- Awards: Premios Gardel a Mejor Álbum Artista de Folklore (2024)
- Website: Maggie Cullen en Instagram

Magdalena Cullen (born August 8, 2000), known by her stage name Maggie Cullen, is an Argentine folk singer. In 2024 she won the Premio Gardel (Gardel Award) in the category of Best Folklore Artist Album.

She participated in the talent contest La Voz Argentina and recorded her debut album, Canciones del viento (Wind Song), in 2023.

== Biography ==
Born in Buenos Aires, from the age of 14 she sang in peñas until, in 2021, she participated in the third season of La Voz Argentina (Voice From Argentina), where she reached the semi-finals.

She sang as a guest in a concert by Soledad Pastorutti and was also the opening act for Abel Pintos.

In 2023 she won the Gardel Award for Best Folklore Song with "Yo canto versos", by Jorge Fandermole.

In August 2023 she released her debut album, Canciones del viento, an album of 12 songs released by the company DBN Argentina, in which Nadia Larcher, León Gieco and the group Dos Más Uno participated as guests. The album won the Gardel Awards Gardel 2024 in the category of Best Folklore Artist Album.

In 2024 she performed at the National Folklore Festival of Cosquín (where she shared the stage with Raly Barrionuevo), toured nationally, participated in the live tribute to Raúl Carnota organized by Lito Vitale and closed the year at the Teatro Coliseo in Buenos Aires. She also announced that she planned to release a new album, which would include some of her own songs.
