= 33 (song) =

2025 single by Lali and Dillom

Single by Lali and Dillom

from the album No Vayas a Atender Cuando El Demonio Llama
- Released: 24 April 2025
- Genre: Pop rock; alternative rock
- Length: 3:44
- Label: Sony Argentina
- Songwriters: Mariana Espósito; Dylan León Masa; Mauro De Tommaso; Federico Barreto; Juan Giménez Kuj; Isabela Terán Lieban; Mariano Napoli
- Producers: Mauro De Tommaso; Don Barreto

Lali singles chronology
| "Loco Un Poco" (2025) | "33" (2025) | "Plástico" (2025) |

Dillom singles chronology
| "Tócame" (2025) | "33" (2025) | "Rojo Profundo" (2025) |

Music video
- "33" on YouTube

"33" is a song recorded by Argentine singers Lali and Dillom, included in Lali's sixth studio album, No Vayas a Atender Cuando el Demonio Llama (2025). It was written by both artists alongside BB Asul, Juan Giménez Kuj, Mariano Napoli, Mauro De Tommaso, and Don Barreto, while production was handled by the latter two. Conceived as a track that blends pop rock, alternative rock influences, and electronic elements, its lyrics explore themes of maturity, transformation, and reflection on the passage of time—symbolized by its title, which references Lali's age at the time of releasing the song. The song was released as a single on 24 April 2025 through Sony Music Argentina as the album's fourth single.

== Music and lyrics ==
"33" combines elements of pop rock, alternative rock, and electronic-infused production [0]. Its lyrics function as a personal manifesto in which Lali reflects on her age, emotional shifts, loss, and the changing nature of relationships over time. The song incorporates irony, generational references, and an introspective tone aligned with the album's rock-oriented and visceral aesthetic.

Lali explained that she wrote the song at age 33, and that its narrative is tied to emotional growth, personal setbacks and recoveries, and the contradictions inherent to this stage of life. The title directly refers to her age and the symbolism associated with a moment of maturity, transformation, and new beginnings.

== Music video ==
The release of "33" was accompanied by a music video filmed in an abandoned factory, directed by Lali and Lautaro Espósito. In the visual piece, Lali and Dillom walk separate paths within the dark, industrial setting until they meet in a raw and cathartic ending. The video's aesthetic reinforces the song's introspective and existential tone and aligns with the album's overall cinematic and darker visual narrative.

== Critical reception ==
Lucas Terrazas of Infobae highlighted "33" as one of the album's standout tracks, emphasizing the blend between Lali's "provocative pop" and Dillom's "avant-garde darkness". Marianel Battaglia of Perfil described the track as "a meeting point between two different yet complementary sonic identities," praising its intensity, viscerality, and conceptual depth. Other outlets characterized the single as intense, visceral, conceptual, and marked by the fusion of two contrasting but harmonious musical worlds.

== Charts ==
=== Weekly charts ===
Weekly chart performance for "33"
| Chart (2025) | Peak position |
|---|---|
| Argentina Hot 100 (Billboard) | 29 |
| Argentina Airplay (Monitor Latino) | 8 |
| Argentina National Songs (Monitor Latino) | 4 |
| Argentina Pop Rhythmic (Monitor Latino) | 6 |
| Chile Pop (Monitor Latino) | 17 |
| Paraguay Pop (Monitor Latino) | 12 |
| Uruguay Pop (Monitor Latino) | 2 |

=== Year-end charts ===
2025 year-end chart performance for "33"
| Chart (2025) | Position |
|---|---|
| Argentina Airplay (Monitor Latino) | 43 |
| Argentina Pop Airplay (Monitor Latino) | 23 |
| Paraguay Pop Airplay (Monitor Latino) | 82 |
| Uruguay Pop Airplay (Monitor Latino) | 96 |
