= Fanático =

2024 single by Lali

Single by Lali

from the album No Vayas a Atender Cuando El Demonio Llama
- Released: 27 September 2024
- Recorded: 2023–2024
- Genre: Latin pop; pop rock
- Length: 2:42
- Label: Sony Argentina
- Songwriters: Mariana Espósito; Martin D'Agosto; Mauro De Tommaso; Isabela Teran Lieban; Federico Barreto; Juan Giménez Kuj
- Producers: Mauro De Tommaso; Don Barreto

Lali singles chronology
"S.O.S" (2024)	"Fanático" (2024)	"No Me Importa" (2024)

Music video
- "Fanático" on YouTube

"Fanático" (transl. "fan") is a song recorded by Argentine singer Lali. It was released through Sony Music Argentina on 27 September 2024 as the lead single from her sixth studio album, No Vayas a Atender Cuando El Demonio Llama (2025). The song was co-written by Lali, Galán, BB Asul, Juan Giménez Kuj, Mauro De Tommaso and Don Barreto, and produced by the latter two. The pop rock track and its accompanying music video feature pointed references to Lali's feud with current president of Argentina, Javier Milei, emphasizing his dismissive remarks about her.

In 2024, the song was named "Hit of the Year" by Rolling Stone Argentina. At the 27th Annual Gardel Awards, "Fanático" won in the categories for Song of the Year, Best Pop Song, and Best Short Form Music Video.

== Background and release ==
After Javier Milei, a far-right candidate, won the 2023 Argentine primary elections, Lali tweeted her disapproval, calling the outcome "dangerous" and "sad". This led to intense backlash from Milei and his supporters, resulting in harassment and the spread of misinformation about her. Milei's political agenda included proposals to repeal abortion rights and ban comprehensive sex education, among other social conservatism policies. Lali's statement resonated with many who feared the consequences of his policies, and her words became a rallying point for opposition. Despite facing ongoing harassment and false narratives about her finances, Lali defended her right to speak out. At the Cosquín Rock festival, she altered the lyrics of her song "Quiénes Son?" to directly address Milei's dismissive remarks against her. This performance garnered widespread support from other artists and public figures.

In the following months, Lali attempted to seek peace, but the president continued to incite hatred against her, leading to escalating harassment. The "intense" media confrontation was compared to that of Donald Trump against Taylor Swift in the United States. While Lali spoke publicly about the feud, she maintained a respectful tone, aiming to avoid further conflict. After months of silence, she released "Fanático" in response to the lies propagated by the president and the harassment she endured. She later shared that it had been Fito Páez who had advised her not to directly engage with the president but instead to channel her response through her art and music.

=== Announcement ===
On the morning of 24 September 2024, a Spotify ad billboard featuring Lali's face appeared at the intersection of Coronel Niceto Vega Avenue and Justiano Carranza Street in Palermo, Buenos Aires. The billboard displayed the phrase "Poné Disciplina para entrar en calor" (transl. "play 'Disciplina' to warm up"), referencing her 2022 single "Disciplina". The next morning, the billboard was found vandalized with graffiti covering Lali's face, including devil horns, a mustache, and a dollar sign. This incident quickly drew attention in Argentine media, with speculation that supporters of Milei were behind it. Despite the vandalism, many fans flocked to the site to take photos. The following day, the single was announced with the vandalized billboard serving as its official cover. It was later revealed that Lali's team had orchestrated the stunt as a promotional strategy. In the music video, Lali is shown vandalizing her own image, and the phrase from the billboard turned out to be a lyric from the song.

== Music and lyrics ==
"Fanático" was labelled as a pop rock diss track that combines a strong, rebellious rock vibe with the pop essence and energy characteristic of Lali. Its "simple and very mischievous" lyrics dissect misinformation culture, providing a sharp commentary on contemporary society while retaining Lali's characteristic humor. She employs laughter and playfulness as strategies to combat fake news. Romina Navarro from Global Voices said that the lyrics "could easily be about any fan who becomes absurdly obsessed with their favorite star, but the images and the context of the confrontation between Milei and [Lali] Espósito make the reference clear".

Unlike her previous album, Lali (2023), which was primarily a pop record created with Galán and Mauro De Tommaso, she chose to broaden her musical horizons and songwriting team for this new era. She invited BB Asul, Don Barreto, and Juan Giménez Kuj to collaborate with her and decided to innovate her musical style. Since early 2024, she had hinted that the upcoming album would draw significant inspiration from 1970s and 1980s Argentine rock. "Fanático", the first song released from that project, already reflected the sound, lyrics, aesthetics, and rebellious spirit of that era and style of music.

== Critical reception ==
In a positive review, Filo News praised the song, stating that "with this new track, [Lali] reinvents herself on the musical horizon, pushing the boundaries of her own sound". Similarly, Infobae noted that "without changing her cheeky pop essence, Lali expresses her rebellion and rock spirit like never before". Irina Avilés Millán from Los 40 highlighted the aesthetics and sound of the single, adding that "the song has a rock edge that perfectly aligns with the message the protagonist aims to convey". Humphrey Inzillo from the Argentine edition of Rolling Stone remarked that the song "impresses with its rock sound, referencing the alternative vibes of the nineties while retaining its pop essence". Meanwhile, Noelia Torres of Tiempo Argentino wrote: "In true Taylor Swift style, the national pop star has kicked off her 'Scandal Era'".

David Montufo from El Periódico described the track as "surprising". Lourdes Maidana from Indie Club called it a "great track," praising its "fresh sound" and "top-notch production". Radidja Cieslak from the French newspaper Libération lauded the song, stating that "the melody is frenetic, the lyrics corrosive, akin to a musical raid"; she also compared it to Mariah Carey's "Obsessed", which responded to rapper Eminem's sexist accusations.

In November 2024, the song was named Rolling Stone Argentina's most recommended song of the month and was dubbed a "political hit".

== Commercial performance ==
In Argentina, "Fanático" debuted at number five on the Billboard Argentina Hot 100, becoming Lali's highest debut and highest position achieved on the chart. This surpassed "N5", which had reached number nine in August 2022. The song also peaked at number five on the CAPIF singles chart.

== Awards and nominations ==
At the 27th Annual Gardel Awards, "Fanático" triumphed in all three categories it was nominated for. It won Song of the Year, making Lali the first artist in the award's history to win that category four times. The song also earned Best Short Form Music Video, marking Lali's third win in that category—and her third consecutive one—following her victories with "Disciplina" in 2023 and "Quiénes Son?" in 2024. Lastly, she took home the award for Best Pop Song, bringing her total Gardel Award wins to 13. With this achievement, Lali tied with Mercedes Sosa as the female artist with the most wins in the history of the Gardel Awards.

Awards and nominations for "Fanático"
Year	Organization	Award	Result	Ref.
2025	Premios Gardel	Song of the Year	Won	
2025	Premios Gardel	Best Pop Song	Won	
2025	Premios Gardel	Best Music Video	Won	

== Music video ==
An accompanying music video was released alongside the single, directed by Lali and Lautaro Espósito. The clip stood out for its numerous references and hidden messages.

=== Synopsis ===
The video begins with a figure approaching a microphone, accompanied by an audience chanting "Olé, Olé, Olé, Lali". It is soon revealed that the figure is not Lali but a look-alike dressed in her costume for the 26th Annual Premios Gardel performance. In the next scene, the real Lali is shown sitting at a table in a warehouse, holding auditions for "the new Lali". Various candidates appear: one in a red leather outfit reminiscent of Lali's iconic Disciplina Tour attire, another wearing a "Who The Fuck Is Lali?" t-shirt, and a third, portrayed by Argentine actor Lucas Spadafora, dressed in her famous nun costume from Esperanza Mía.

During the chorus, Lali and her band perform the song, adopting a 1990s rock aesthetic with outfits and wigs. The casting call continues, featuring more candidates: a Lali barra brava (akin to American ultras or British hooligans), and a drag queen in an outfit inspired by Lali's Libra album cover. A young man in a suit, visibly disinterested, expresses his disdain for being there. He is later transformed by the Disciplina Tour Lali, reappearing in a sparkling platinum jacket and holding a whip.

One of the more controversial candidates, a man in a leather jacket, tears apart a sign reading "Fan #38,900" while yelling at Lali, who is casually eating a hotdog and eventually falls asleep. The barra brava intervenes to remove him.

In the next scene, Lali performs a dance routine with her dancers on top of a truck. A flag featuring Lali's face is unfurled, and someone graffitis it, interspersed with images of the dance routine and the various candidates spinning behind her. Toward the end of the video, all the Lalis engage in a lively dance, throwing artificial foam (or fake snow) and silly string at each other. It is ultimately revealed that the person vandalizing Lali's picture was Lali herself. This defaced image served as the actual cover for the single.

=== Analysis ===
The music video was subject to multiple interpretations, with many analyses converging on similar themes. As the lyrics humorously address Lali's feud with Argentine president Javier Milei and the harassment she faced from him, his party, and his supporters, the video also references and even "ridicules" the president.

The clip was filmed in a warehouse, a setting not chosen at random. The term "depósito" in Spanish translates to both "warehouse" and "deposit". This is significant because, in February 2024, Milei nicknamed Lali "Lali Depósito", suggesting her wealth came from taxpayer money through state contracts for public performances. He implied that she embodied the state largesse he criticized.

Moreover, one of the character was widely interpreted as a portrayal of the president: a middle-aged man sporting sideburns and a leather jacket, "bearing a striking resemblance to Milei", who appears yelling angrily at Lali. This man first appears tearing down a sign that reads "Fan No. 38,900." This number is notable because it alludes to the estimated 30,000 people killed or disappeared during Argentina's 1976-1983 civic-military dictatorship, along with the 8,900 identified victims documented by the National Commission on the Disappearance of Persons (CONADEP). During his campaign, Milei had repeatedly denied the existence of these 30,000 disappeared individuals, dismissing the events as merely a "war", which he also endorsed. Thus, the act of tearing apart the sign labeled "38,900" carries significance and makes it clear that the character referenced the president directly.

The man auditioning to be the new Lali connects to the lyric "His biggest fantasy is one day being me". Lali is a successful singer and actress known for selling out football stadiums and winning numerous singing and acting awards, earning her many fans. Some suggest that Milei's fixation on Lali stems from his frustration over not achieving similar success artistically. During his time as president, his actions blurred the lines between his duties and artistic ambitions; he organized a concert at Luna Park Arena and starred in a docuseries about his rise to power. For these reasons, it was interpreted that Lali mocks the president in her lyrics and the video, implying that he aspires to be like her despite claiming disinterest.

Another nod to the president's dismissive remarks occurs when one of the candidate wears a "Who The Fuck Is Lali?" t-shirt. This phrase echoed comments Milei made in August 2023, asserting, "I don't know who Lali is. I only listen to The Rolling Stones", despite dedicating multiple social media posts to her. Lali mocks this sentiment, referencing a similar t-shirt featuring Mick Jagger from the 1970s, which became a popular item at the time.

Another referenced figure in the video is a man in a suit, smoking a cigarette, resembling Santiago Caputo, Milei's advisor and right-hand man. Some social media users speculated that he could also represent Iñaki Gutiérrez, the former social media advisor who emulated Caputo's style due to its popularity. After the Disciplina Tour Lali takes him by the hand, he reappears wearing a sparkling platinum jacket and holding a whip, now embracing his role as a new fan of Lali.

Among many references, the truck featured during the dance routine has a sign on the driver's door that reads "Soda El Flaco", nodding to Soda Stereo and Luis Alberto "El Flaco" Spinetta, two iconic figures in the Argentine rock scene who inspired Lali for the song and the album. The video concludes with Lali and her fans throwing artificial foam or fake snow, referencing her remarks from February 2024, when she metaphorically described the hostility towards her as "foam" created by the president and his media to distract from larger issues.

== Impact ==
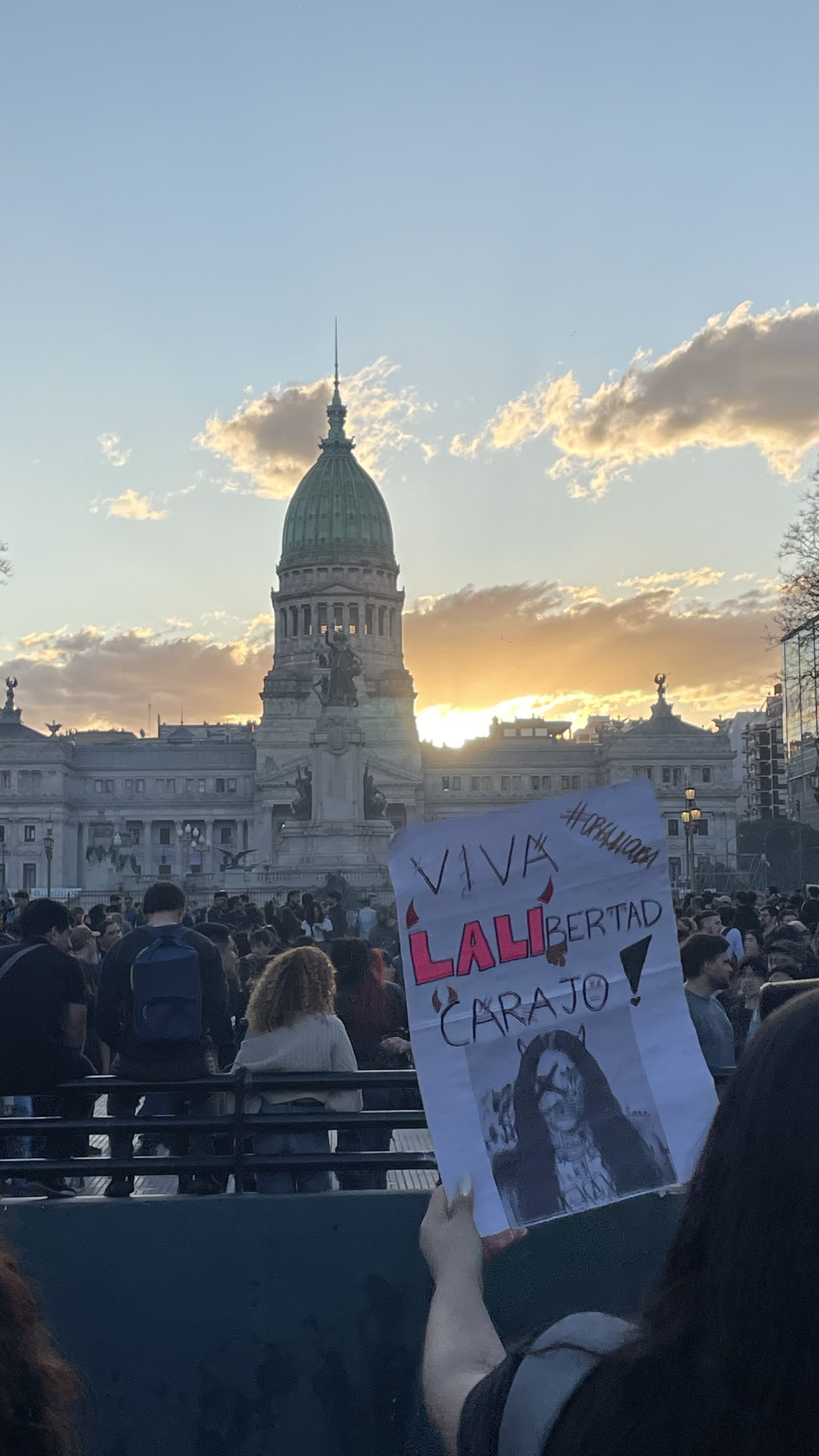
A protest sign held by a demonstrator in front of the National Congress during the federal university march in October 2024.

=== Impact on culture ===
Due to its critical and provocative nature, the song quickly gained popularity in protests against Milei's policies.

Following Milei's intention to veto the College Funding Bill, which was passed by the Argentine Senate in September 2024 to increase funding for public universities, thousands of protesters—mainly university students, alumni, teachers, and staff—took to the streets on 2 October 2024. This event, known as the second federal university march, spanned from the gates of Congress in Buenos Aires to remote mountain valleys. Protesters demanded more funding for national public education, better salaries for university staff, and opposed Milei's potential veto of the bill. The large gathering in front of the National Congress concluded with the song "Fanático," played after the final speech by the Argentine University Federation (FUA), serving as a musical critique of Milei's government.

During the protest, attendees held signs referencing the song and the singer, featuring lyrics and slogans like "Even if you act tough, you lack affection. Long live Lali!" and "Who audits Lali's fan?". In addition, other groups of students changed the song's lyrics to directly address Milei and minister of security Patricia Bullrich, creating a protest chant.

On 23 October 2024, students from the National University of the Arts (UNA) also used the song in their protest against government cuts to education funding, staging a flash mob at the Once railway station, a major terminal for the Sarmiento Line in the Balvanera neighborhood of Buenos Aires. In an interview with Infobae, Aluhe Retamar, president of the movement department at UNA, explained: "We chose [the song] because it resonates with our fight. It clearly states what we stand for, and we will pursue this to the end. Lali has been a strong defender of culture, especially as this government has attacked it since taking office".

During the 33rd Annual Buenos Aires Pride on 2 November 2024, "Fanático" was once again used as a protest anthem. Signs referencing the song and Lali became a way to express solidarity and opposition to the repeal of various gender-related public policies and the dissolution of agencies implementing them, as a result of the government's policies under Javier Milei. Meanwhile, Candela Toledo of Clarín stated that Lali had become "a symbol of the march".

=== Academic analysis ===
Sebastipan Bottecelli, a professor at the University of Buenos Aires (UBA) and the National University of Tres de Febrero (UNTREF), conducted an analysis on the need to rethink traditional interpretive frameworks in order to understand the "current times" in Argentina, particularly through the impact of "Fanático". Bottecelli argued that, although the song is not traditionally political—unlike tracks such as "Se Viene" by Bersuit Vergarabat or "El Mono Relojero" by Kapanga, which he also referenced—it had a significant impact on the political imagination of young people and could serve as a catalyst for opposition to Javier Milei's government. He also pointed out that the song's influence was evident during the federal university march on 2 October 2024 in Buenos Aires, where hundreds of young people sang it as a "protest anthem".

=== Political response ===
Just hours after the single was released, Javier Milei shared a cryptic message on his Twitter/X account saying: "Some artist wants to keep earning $300,000 usd from Kirchnerism. End". Many users speculated that this was a direct reference to Lali.

Meanwhile, Lali faced plagiarism accusations from supporters of the Argentine president, who claimed her work resembled Pink's "So What", released in 2008 as part of the album Funhouse. The newspaper Urgente 24 conducted a comparative study of the two songs and found no melodic similarities. They also highlighted clear differences in theme, composition, rhythm, time, and harmonic progression.

Later, during a TV interview, Milei's spokesperson, Manuel Adorni, was asked about the music video for the song. Although he admitted he hadn't seen it, he expressed his dislike for the musical style, calling it "music I don't like" and "a style I loathe". However, he acknowledged Lali as a "top-tier artist".

On 17 November 2024, Cristina Fernández de Kirchner, former president of Argentina and leader of the opposition to Milei's government, entered the stage to the song "Fanático" during a political event in Santiago del Estero celebrating Peronist Militancy Day. This event also marked her first political activity outside Buenos Aires since being proclaimed President of the Justicialist Party (PJ).

== Live performances ==
Lali performed "Fanático" live for the first time at Susana Giménez talk show. Dressed in a black top, a vest, and sparkly black pants, she "dazzled the audience". At the beginning of her performance, she gave a nod to the host when a phone rang and she playfully said, "Hello, Susana", referencing the host's iconic catchphrase. Lali received praise for her stage presence, the energy of the song, and her choreography. Reports indicated that Susana Giménez's ratings improved with Lali as a guest, reversing a downward trend and averaging 13.5 points.

== Personnel ==
- Lali – vocals, songwriter
- Mauro De Tommaso – songwriter, producer, guitar, keyboards, recording engineer
- Don Barreto – songwriter, producer, keyboards
- Juan Giménez Kuj – songwriter, guitar, keyboards, recording engineer
- Martín D'Agosto – songwriter, background vocals
- BB Asul – songwriter
- Guillermo Salort – drums
- Sebastián Cavalletti – drums editor
- Dave Kutch – mastering
- Brian Taylor – mixing
- Nicolás Parker – recording engineer

== Charts ==
Weekly chart performance for "Fanático"
Chart (2024)	Peak position
Argentina Hot 100 (Billboard)	5
Argentina (CAPIF)	5

== Certifications ==
Region	Certification	Certified units/sales
Argentina (CAPIF)	Platinum	20,000^{‡}
^{‡} Sales+streaming figures based on certification alone.
