= Marilina Bertoldi =

Argentine musician (born 1988)

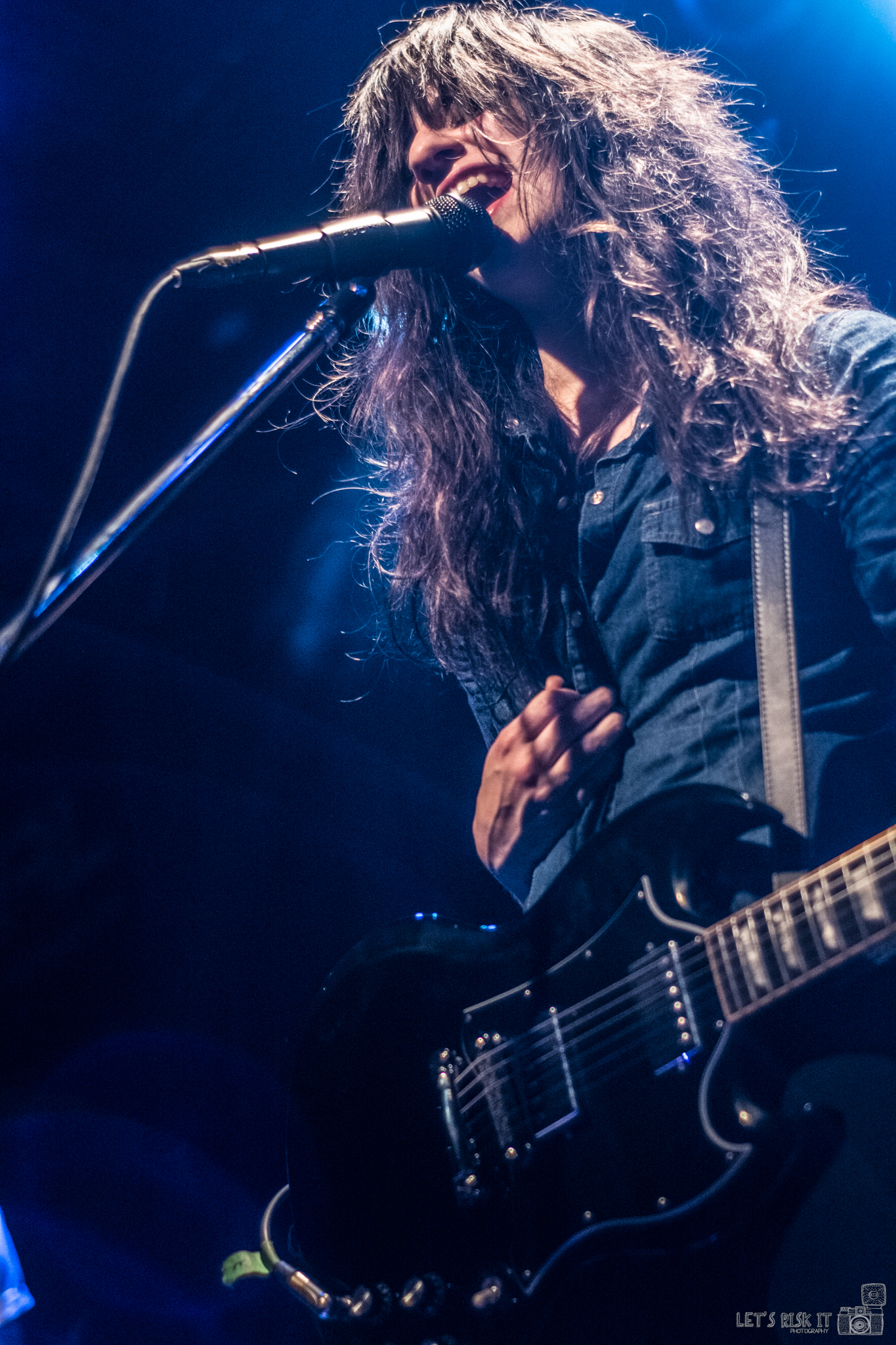
- Marilina Bertoldi in 2014.

Background information
- Born: September 13, 1988 (age 38); Santa Fe, Argentina
- Origin: Sunchales
- Genres: Argentine rock; alternative rock; punk rock; hard rock
- Occupations: Singer; songwriter; guitarist
- Instruments: Vocals; guitar; piano
- Years active: 2010–present

Marilina Bertoldi (born September 13, 1988 in Santa Fe, Argentina) is an Argentine singer-songwriter and guitarist from Sunchales in Santa Fe. She rose to prominence as the lead singer of the alternative rock band Connor Questa and later as a solo artist. She has received several awards and nominations including three Gardel Awards and two Latin Grammy Awards nominations.

== Career ==
Bertoldi was born in Sunchales, Santa Fe in Argentina. After moving to Buenos Aires, she formed the band Marilina Connor Questa in 2010, as the lead singer alongside Hernán Rupolo (guitars), Martín Casado (bass) and Facundo Veloso (drums), replaced by Agustín Agostinelli in 2011. The band released the EP Marilina Connor Questa the same year independently. In 2011, they released their debut studio album Somos por Partes, which was promoted through YouTube and with different performances in Córdoba and Santa Fe. After changing the name of the band to Connor Questa in 2013, they released their second album Fuego al Universo (2013), produced by Gabriel Pedernera from Eruca Sativa and recorded at MLC Records. In 2015, the band announced on their Facebook page that the band would split after facing "great conceptual differences about the present and the future of the band".

During her career with Connor Questa, she released her first solo studio album El Peso del Aire Suspirado (2012), followed by La Presencia de las Personas que se Van in 2015, both influenced by her experiences with separations in her life and family. On April 26, 2016, she released her third album Sexo con Modelos with "Cosas Dulces" and "Y Deshacer" as the album's singles. The project received a nomination for Best Rock Album at the 17th Annual Latin Grammy Awards and won Best Female Rock Album at the 19th Annual Gardel Awards.

Her fourth album Prender un Fuego was released on October 3, 2018 with production from Brian Taylor and mastering by Matt Colton. The album was nominated for the Latin Grammy Award for Best Alternative Music Album while at the 21st Annual Gardel Awards, the album won Album of the Year, also named Gardel de Oro (Golden Gardel), becoming the secong female artist to receive the award and the first in almost 20 years after Mercedes Sosa won in 2000.

In 2022, she released her fifth solo album Mojigata. The album was nominated for Best Rock Album at the 23rd Annual Latin Grammy Awards, being Bertoldi's third Latin Grammy nomination.

== Personal life ==
She is openly gay. Her sister, Lula Bertoldi, is a member of the alternative rock band Eruca Sativa.

== Influences ==
Bertoldi has mentioned Argentine singer Gustavo Cerati as one of the artists that has inspired her the most. She has also expressed her admiration for singers such as Nina Simone and Aretha Franklin, especially for her first album with Connor Questa where there is a cover of Franklin's song "Respect".

== Discography ==
=== With Connor Questa ===
- Marilina Connor Questa (2010, EP)
- Somos por Partes (2011)
- Fuego al Universo (2013)

=== As solo artist ===
- El Peso del Aire Suspirado (2012)
- La Presencia de las Personas que se Van (2015)
- Sexo con Modelos (2016)
- Prender un Fuego (2018)
- Mojigata (2022)
- PARA QUIEN TRABAJAS Vol. I (2025)

== Awards and nominations ==
=== Gardel Awards ===
Year	Category	Nominated work	Result	Ref.
2017	Best Female Rock Album	Sexo con Modelos	Won	
2019	Album of the Year	Prender un Fuego	Won	
2019	Best Female Rock Album	Prender un Fuego	Won	
2019	Song of the Year	"Fumar de Día"	Nominated	
2020	Best DVD	Sesión Saldias	Nominated	
2023	Best Rock Album	Mojigata	Pending	
2023	Best Rock Song	"La cena"	Pending	

Note: For his work as engineer in Prender un Fuego, Brian Taylor received a nomination for Recording Engineer of the Year.

=== Latin Grammy Awards ===
Year	Category	Nominated work	Result	Ref.
2016	Best Rock Album	Sexo con Modelos	Nominated	
2019	Best Alternative Music Album	Prender un Fuego	Nominated	
2022	Best Rock Album	Mojigata	Nominated	
2025	Best Rock Album	Luna en Obras (En Vivo)	Pending	
2025	Best Alternative Music Album	Para Quién Trabajas Vol. I	Pending	

=== Konex Awards ===
Year	Award	Category	Result	Ref.
2025	Konex Merit Diploma	Rock Soloist	Won	
