= La Voz del Interior =

Argentine newspaper

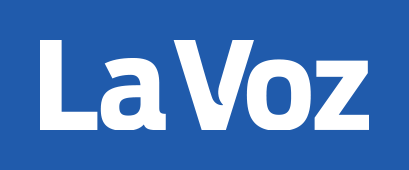
- Type: Daily newspaper
- Owner: Clarín Group
- Publisher: Osvaldo Salas
- Editor: Luis Eduardo Remonda; Dr. Carlos Jornet
- Founded: 1904
- Political alignment: Conservatism
- Headquarters: Córdoba, Argentina
- Circulation: 65,000
- Website: La Voz

La Voz del Interior is a daily Spanish language newspaper edited and published in Córdoba, capital of the province of Córdoba, Argentina and the second-largest city in the country. The newspaper is the leading daily in Córdoba, and one of the most important in the country outside of Buenos Aires.

The newspaper was founded on March 15, 1904, in Córdoba by businessman Silvestre Rafael Remonda and journalist Juan Dionisio Naso. The first issue contained only six pages, with the front page unusually displaying classified advertisements.

== Circulation ==
La Voz had a circulation of 65,000 copies in 2000. According to third-party web analytics providers Alexa and SimilarWeb, La Voz' website is the 51st and 92nd most-visited in Argentina respectively, as of August 2015. SimilarWeb rates the site as the tenth most-visited news website in Argentina, attracting almost 5 million visitors per month.

== Criticism ==
A controversy arose at the daily during the 2008 Argentine government conflict with the agricultural sector, where columnist Enrique Lacolla was censored and eventually fired before publishing a column opposing landowner lockouts titled "sedition of the agricultural sector". CISPREN (Círculo Sindical de la Prensa y la Comunicación de Córdoba, Circle Press Association and the Communication of Córdoba) condemned the episode.

== In popular culture ==
The Córdoba-born singer Rodrigo mentions La Voz del Interior in his song "Amor clasificado", included on the album A 2000 (1999). The song tells the story of a young man who places a classified advertisement in the newspaper. The song also pays tribute to the singer's mother, who worked as a newspaper vendor in the city of Córdoba.
