= Post Mortem (Dillom album) =

Studio album by Dillom
- Released: 1 December 2021
- Recorded: 2020–2021
- Studio: El Árbol; Sonorámica
- Genre: Hip hop; horrorcore; pop; rock
- Length: 43:43
- Label: Bohemian Groove
- Producer: Dillom; Fermín Ugarte; Ramón Evar Peaguda; Luis Tomás La Madrid

Dillom chronology
Post Mortem (2021)	Por cesárea (2024)

Singles from Post Mortem
- 1. "Opa" Released: 27 May 2021; 2. "Piso 13" Released: 24 September 2021; 3. "Pelotuda" Released: 17 November 2021; 4. "Rocketpowers" Released: 13 April 2022

Post Mortem is the debut studio album by Argentine rapper and singer Dillom. It was released on 1 December 2021 by his own record label, Bohemian Groove. Production for the album is handled by Fermín Ugarte, Ramón Evar Peaguda, Luis Tomás La Madrid and Dillom himself. Post Mortem received widespread acclaim from music journalists, and was placed on several year-end critics' lists. The album spawned four singles: "Opa", "Piso 13", "Pelotuda" and "Rocketpowers". The Post Mortem Tour kicked off in February 2022.

Post Mortem received three nominations at the 2022 Premios Gardel, including Best Urban Music Album.

== Background and composition ==
Dillom rose to fame in 2018 with the self-produced track "Dripping" and founded the creative team Rip Gang, alongside fellow musicians Ill Quentín, Muerejoven, Odd Mami, Taichu and Saramalacara. In 2019, he became one of the most prominent figures in "the new wave of Argentine trap" with a lauded performance at Buenos Aires Trap Festival and a much-discussed collaboration with producer and DJ Bizarrap. In 2020, Dillom founded his own record label, Bohemian Groove, and released his most successful solo single to date, "Dudade". In 2021, he was featured on L-Gante's "Tinty Nasty" and announced that we would release his debut album later in the year.

Dillom worked on Post Mortem for two years and described the process as "challenging" and "exhausting". During an interview with TN, he said that what inspired him to make the album was his "fear of death"; "There were many great things happening in my life and suddenly I was afraid of dying [...] I think the only way towards immortality is through art so I made an album with what I want to be left from me if I die." Post Mortem was produced by Fermín Ugarte, Ramón Evar Peaguda, Luis Tomás La Madrid and Dillom himself, and was recorded at Estudio El Árbol in Buenos Aires and Estudio Sonorámica in Córdoba.

== Music and lyrics ==
Post Mortem was described as an "eclectic" mix of hip hop, horrorcore, pop and rock, with elements of industrial, experimental and trap. Consisting of 18 tracks, it is a concept album about "overcoming the fear of death" and addresses topics such as his childhood, family, love, fame and existentialism. Dillom expressed he wanted the album to be an "instant classic", aiming for an "iconic, timeless" production.

Post Mortem opens with "La Primera", a ballad noted for "[having] some of the most beautiful lines on the album". A music video directed by Santiago Chaher and Noduermo portrays Dillom's troubled childhood and "a tragic ending". Dillom described the video as "special". The second track, "Hegemónica", features L-Gante and was labeled as RKT, an Argentine music genre that combines cumbia villera and reggaeton. "Pelotuda" was noted for adapting American slang into Spanish and was compared to rapper Eminem. A music video was directed by Noduermo. The following track, "Demian", is a spoken-word interlude featuring Argentine journalist Mario Pergolini. It is a "horror story" depicting fictional character Demian's "strange transformation in the middle of the forest". It leads into the title track, in which Demian kills his friends. Musically, it was described as "cyber-pop". Sixth track "Bicicleta" "flirts with pop and dance music".

"Duo" is an instrumental interlude that leads to "Piso 13", an alternative hip hop and industrial piece. Its lyrics were described as "sharp" and "packed with Argentine culture references". A "dense, dark" music video was directed by Noduermo. This part of the album was described as the "darkest", with ninth track "Side" noted for its personal lyrics, touching upon themes such as his mother. Fellow Rip Gang member Muerejoven is featured on "Coach", a trap song described as a "more straightforward rapper [type of] track". "Bohemian Groove Skit", another spoken-word interlude, is a parodic radio advertisement for Dillom's own record label, Bohemian Groove. Lead single "Opa" features flutes and was described as "one of the most accomplished tracks [in urban music] of recent times." A music video directed by Noduermo was inspired by Tyler, the Creator, Eminem and the 2000s. "Rili Rili" is a rap rock song, while "220" features a "soft" indie pop sound. "220" is Dillom's favorite song on the album, describing it as "introspective" and praising himself for "being able to face what [he feels] with no shame".

The album's final section opens with "Toda la Gente", a choir and piano interlude reminiscent of 80s Argentine rock, most notably Fito Páez. "Reality" was compared to Marilyn Manson, while "Rocketpowers", featuring Rip Gang member Saramalacara, was described as a "fun", blink-182-influenced post-punk track. Post Mortem closes with "Amigos Nuevos", a "vulnerable" ballad which Dillom described as "hard to write".

== Artwork ==
The artwork for Post Mortem was made by Argentine painters Marcelo Canevari and Ornella Pocetti. Dillom personally wanted "characters that were innocent, child-like, with a darker twist", which was similar to Canevari and Pocetti's usual work. The ghost featured in the cover can be found in most of Canevari's paintings. The artwork was first made digitally and then painted on actual canvas and has an aspect ratio of 10:11.

Indie Hoy praised the cover as "disturbing and fascinating" and described it as a "visual fable where Dillom is at the center of a spiritual session surrounded by ghosts and creatures creeping on the musician". They also argued that the "dead animals could simbolize the death of innocence" and the "catastrophic" landscape was connected to the "life episodes narrated throughout the album". Visual arts magazine Ramona compared the artwork to Meditations on a Hobby Horse (1963) by British art historian Ernst Gombrich.

In June 2022, Dillom expressed his disappointment over Post Mortem not receiving a nomination for Best Album Cover at the 2022 Premios Gardel. Canevari himself said he "would've liked a nomination", although he "understands they nominate a different type of artwork".

The original painting can be found in Dillom's office at Bohemian Groove, his own record company.

== Reception ==
"Across 18 tracks, we meet with a carousel of styles and genres [...] And this is, precisely, the record's greatest achievement: not for one moment it sounds predictable and that, these days, it's really complicated to find."

—Juan Villain of The Medizine

Post Mortem received widespread acclaim upon release. Malena Sabanes Niccolini from El Destape praised the album and called it "one of the best of the year", while Buenos Aires platform enAgenda lauded Dillom as "the scene's most original artist". Lucas Santomero from Indie Hoy described Post Mortem as "complete, overwhelming and, for some, unexpected [...] Much bigger than a simple trap record". Filo.news also lauded the album as one of the year's best. Writing for La Izquierda Diario, Josefina García called it "an unprecedented phenomenon" and praised its concept, cohesiveness and sound. Juan Villain from The Medizine pointed out the album's mixture of music genres and styles as its "greatest achievement".

The music video for "Piso 13" received two nominations at the 2021 Buenos Aires Music Video Festival Awards, including Best Art Direction.

Post Mortem received two nominations at the 2022 Premios Gardel for Best Urban Music Album and Best Newcomer. "Opa" received one nomination for Best Urban Music Song.

As of February 2024, Post Mortem amassed over 230 million streams on Spotify.

=== Year-end lists ===
Publication	Position
Indie Hoy - 50 Best Albums of 2021	2
Rolling Stone Argentina - 30 Best Albums of 2021	21
Mondo Sonoro - 90 Best Ibero-American Albums of 2021	N/A

== Tour ==
Post Mortem Tour
- Tour by Dillom
- Official poster for the first leg of the tour
- Associated album: Post Mortem
- Start date: February 13, 2022
- End date: July 22, 2023
- Legs: 3
- No. of shows: 48

Dillom announced he would tour Argentina, Latin America and Europe to support the album. The Post Mortem Tour kicked off on February 13, 2022, at Cosquín Rock Festival in Córdoba. Tickets for the shows at Teatro Vorterix sold out in less than 4 minutes.

The Post Mortem Tour received positive feedback from both critics and fans. The gigs at Cosquín Rock Festival and Lollapalooza were lauded as "consecrating". El Planteo described the show as "detailed" and "comprehensive".

List of concerts, showing date, city, country and venue
Date	City	Country	Venue
Leg I
February 13, 2022	Santa María de Punilla	Argentina	Cosquín Rock Festival
March 12, 2022	Luján de Cuyo	Argentina	Luján Suena Festival
March 18, 2022	San Isidro	Argentina	Lollapalooza
April 27, 2022	Buenos Aires	Argentina	Teatro Vorterix
April 28, 2022	Buenos Aires	Argentina	Teatro Vorterix
April 29, 2022	Buenos Aires	Argentina	Teatro Vorterix
May 3, 2022	Buenos Aires	Argentina	Teatro Vorterix
May 7, 2022	San Luis	Argentina	Comuna Club
May 8, 2022	San Juan	Argentina	Hugo Espectáculos
May 12, 2022	Montevideo	Uruguay	Sala del Museo
May 20, 2022	Rosario	Argentina	Sala de las Artes
May 21, 2022	Córdoba	Argentina	Club Paraguay
May 24, 2022	Neuquén	Argentina	Casino Magic
May 27, 2022	Mar del Plata	Argentina	GAP
June 5, 2022	Barcelona	Spain	Primavera Sound
June 9, 2022	Madrid	Spain	Sala Club Independencia
Leg II
August 13, 2022	La Plata	Argentina	Teatro Opera
August 14, 2022	La Plata	Argentina	Teatro Opera
August 18, 2022	Bahía Blanca	Argentina	Complejo Bailotage
August 19, 2022	Bahía Blanca	Argentina	Complejo Bailotage
August 21, 2022	Mendoza	Argentina	Auditorio Bustelo
August 25, 2022	Corrientes	Argentina	Yapire
August 26, 2022	Posadas	Argentina	UMMA
September 2, 2022	Salta	Argentina	La Rosa Disco
September 3, 2022	Tucumán	Argentina	Club Floresta
September 8, 2022	Santa Rosa	Argentina	Club Jockey Santa Rosa
September 9, 2022	Villa María	Argentina	Mundo Rojo
October 1, 2022	La Plata	Argentina	Capital Festival
October 12, 2022	Buenos Aires	Argentina	Estadio Luna Park
October 22, 2022	Rosario	Argentina	Bandera Festival
October 29, 2022	Santa Fe	Argentina	Harlem Festival
November 12, 2022	Asunción	Paraguay	Kilk Festival
November 20, 2022	Córdoba	Argentina	La Nueva Generación Festival
November 24, 2022	Barcelona	Spain	Razzmatazz
November 26, 2022	Valencia	Spain	Repvblicca
November 27, 2022	Madrid	Spain	Sala Shoko
December 2, 2022	Bilbao	Spain	Sala Blue
December 3, 2022	Seville	Spain	Sala Fanatic
February 11, 2023	Villa María	Argentina	Festival Internacional de Peñas
February 17, 2023	Jujuy	Argentina	Carnaval Los Tekis
February 19, 2023	Santa María de Punilla	Argentina	Cosquín Rock Festival
March 17, 2023	Santiago	Chile	Lollapalooza
March 22, 2023	Asunción	Paraguay	Asunciónico Festival
March 23, 2023	Asunción	Paraguay	Sacramento Brewing Co.
April 2, 2023	Mexico City	Mexico	Hotel Reforma CDMX
April 21, 2023	Montevideo	Uruguay	Cosquín Rock Festival
Leg III
April 28, 2023	Rosario	Argentina	Hipódromo de Rosario
May 5, 2023	Córdoba	Argentina	Plaza de la Música

== Track listing ==
All songs written and produced by Dillom, Fermín Ugarte, Ramón Evar Peaguda and Luis Tomás La Madrid, unless noted otherwise.

No.	Title	Writer(s)	Length
1.	"La Primera"		3:19
2.	"Hegemónica" (featuring L-Gante)	Dillom; Ugarte; Peaguda; La Madrid; L-Gante	1:46
3.	"Pelotuda"		3:05
4.	"Demian" (featuring Mario Pergolini)		1:52
5.	"Post Mortem"		2:39
6.	"Bicicleta"		3:27
7.	"Duo"		0:42
8.	"Piso 13"		1:59
9.	"Side"		3:11
10.	"Coach" (featuring Muerejoven)	Dillom; Ugarte; Peaguda; La Madrid; Muerejoven	2:57
11.	"Bohemian Groove Skit"		1:00
12.	"Opa"		2:49
13.	"Rili Rili"		2:19
14.	"220"		2:56
15.	"Toda la Gente"		1:56
16.	"Reality"		2:11
17.	"Rocketpowers" (featuring Saramalacara)	Dillom; Ugarte; Peaguda; La Madrid; Saramalacara	3:08
18.	"Amigos Nuevos"		2:19
Total length:			43:43

== Credits and personnel ==
- Dillom – vocals, songwriting, production
- Fermín Ugarte – songwriting, production
- Luis Tomás La Madrid – songwriting, production
- Ramón Evar Peaguda – songwriting, production
- Santiago de Simone – mixing
- Mike Bozzi – mastering
- L-Gante – vocals, songwriting
- Mario Pergolini – vocals
- Muerejoven – vocals, songwriting
- Saramalacara – vocals, songwriting
- Marcelo Canevari – artwork design
- Ornella Pocetti – artwork design
- Noduermo – music video direction
- Santiago Chaher – music video direction
