= Bonton, Dallas =

Neighborhood in Dallas, Texas

Bonton is a historically African-American neighborhood in South Dallas, Texas. The area, zip code 75215, is bounded by Hatcher St. and S Central Expressway to the North and West, respectively, and goes as far as Municipal St. and Donald St. to its East and South. Lauren Woods and Cynthia Mulcahy, artists/researchers, put forth in their Dallas Historical Parks Project, that the name "Bon Ton" is possibly to be derived from the French expression "bon ton," translating to high society, fashionable manner, or style. This was a popular adjective in black society in the early 20th century. Advertisements in local black newspapers like The Dallas Express, used the phrase "High Classed, Bon Ton, Restricted Residences for Negroes" to describe the new housing developments in this area of South Dallas. Bonton was also once closely linked to the black arts and culture district called Deep Ellum, as a direct road originally connected the two areas. The two main racial groups represented in the neighborhood are African Americans and Hispanics, with the former constituting over 75% of the population. Many of Bonton's residents are disadvantaged, with 42.9% of the populace falling below the poverty line and 65% failing to complete high school or achieve an equivalent degree. As factors like these contributed to rising incidents of crime and other social ills, the battle to revitalize the area was born, one that still rages today.

== History ==
Based on historical maps showing the development of the region, the effort to build Bonton spanned from 1919 through the 1940s. The neighborhood's early history, however, is virtually unrecorded. What is known about these days derives from word of mouth from Bonton natives and local Black newspapers. Residents frame this beginning period of Bonton's history as the area's golden age where feelings of camaraderie and mutual respect governed the neighborhood. Even as early as 1932, however, Bonton earned a negative reputation for crime in the dominant culture's media that continues even today. This can be seen in the fact that the first mention of the neighborhood in The Dallas Morning News depicts a gang leader shooting an individual for liquor.

In the 1940s, it became even more difficult for minorities, especially African Americans, to find adequate housing, as the quality of what was available in the area was subpar. As a result, many attempted to spread beyond their racially segregated and overpopulated neighborhoods. The violent backlash that erupted against them was experienced throughout Dallas. Beginning in 1940, white residents began a terror campaign of bombing the newly acquired homes of black residents in traditionally white neighborhoods. This campaign ended only with the United States' entry into World War II. The bombings resumed in 1950 in the Queen City neighborhood just north of Bonton and continued, despite protests and petitions to the Governor pleading for the State to step in. The bombings only ceased when the City finally decided to start making arrests—although no one was ever convicted of the crimes. Jim Schutze's book, "The Accommodation" is the most thorough publication documenting this history of the South Dallas bombings. "White Metropolis" by Michael Philips is a well-researched case study that explores "more than 150 years of Dallas history... [revealing] how white business leaders created both a white racial identity and a Southwestern regional identity that excluded African Americans from power and required Mexican Americans and Jews to adopt Anglo-American norms to achieve what limited positions of power they held.

=== Turner Courts ===
In the 1940s, a nationwide movement was seen within the African American population as they migrated from rural areas to cities such as Dallas. The influx of people, combined with the relative poverty that afflicted the population, compounded the preexisting housing problem of the city of Dallas. The city solved this problem by constructing a series of five housing projects. Originally intended to house 294 families as the city's third public housing unit specifically for African Americans, Turner Courts opened in 1952 and was named in honor J.L. Turner Sr., one of the first practicing black attorneys in the state. The unit was composed of apartments of various sizes open to low income families who were billed rent based on their level of income.

Turner Courts, however, developed into a negative influence on the community of Bonton. Firstly, it reinforced the de facto segregation that existed in South Dallas. In a statement of Turner Courts' objectives in 1962, the Dallas Housing Authority states that the housing project was designated specifically and exclusively for low-income African American families. Although city-sanctioned separation initially existed in Turner Courts, the housing project also went as far as to flout later anti-segregation laws, thus perpetuating the condition. This defiant behavior can be seen in 1968, after a ruling issued on the GI Bill forbade all former servicemen from renting apartments from landlords practicing discrimination. Turner Courts refused to change its ways in a 1968 Dallas Morning News article, declaring that "segregation [was] a way of life" in the housing project and that no, "dramatic change [could be seen] because there [weren't] many Negros here who [were] able to sustain a long and costly lawsuit to force the issue" or to effectively challenge the authority of the housing unit.

Secondly, and most importantly, Turner Courts brought a new intensity and volume to the crime of Bonton. Bonton, along with South Dallas, became so infamous for its crime, that it was used as a benchmark that other areas strove to avoid. A study done of the area in 1969 attributes the increased level of crime to poverty and to the transitory nature of the population and housing. These patterns of crime and segregation continued until the 1980s, when Turner Courts began to be viewed as an embarrassment to the otherwise booming city. The Housing Projects were referred to as exemplifications of the “paradox of Dallas”; the deteriorating, crime-filled projects jumped out against the backdrop of Downtown's skyscrapers. In response to this feeling, Dallas attempted to reduce the crime level in Turner Courts, or “clean up” the area, with a security system of patrols in 1984. The attempt to save the housing project, however, was abandoned in 2009 when it was torn down. In 2012, ground was broken on a new housing complex, Buckeye Trail Commons, which includes aspects such as a community garden and 25 homes for sale in an attempt to provide opportunities to its inhabitants.

== Revitalization ==
Currently, there is a movement to revitalize Bonton.

This effort is spearheaded by BridgeBuilders, a nonprofit Christian organization (under the auspices of Prestonwood Baptist Church) that claims in its mission statement to work to “restore urban communities through education, health, economic development, and spiritual development.” Founded by the late Mike Fechner and Velma Mitchell, the former from an affluent neighborhood in mostly white North Dallas and the latter a Bonton native, H.I.S. BridgeBuilders works to build connections through Jesus Christ that are strong enough to bridge sociocultural differences. The work of the organization manifests in the South Dallas community in various ways including employment training and mentoring programs, which are then followed by a job placement program. Affordable healthcare is provided in optical, dental and counseling clinics, and meaningful relationships are built through regular community outreach opportunities.

Habitat for Humanity has also been a key player in the effort to revive Bonton. In March 2013, the organization pledged $100 million to refurbish or build 1000 homes in Dallas' five poorest neighborhoods, including Bonton, in their Dream Dallas Initiative. The scope of this project can be seen in the fact that in the past 25 years of its existence, Habitat for Humanity has only spent $95 million on building/refurbishing homes; it will spend $5 million more on the Dream Dallas Initiative in just 2013-2014. Dream Dallas will also focus on reducing crime, facilitating access to public transportation, improving education, providing medical services, promoting development of retail services, and will partner with existing community programs.

The Bonton Neighborhood Association, founded by community members Clifton Reese and Velma Mitchell, facilitates residents of the neighborhood in taking pride in their homes and creating an environment in which they want to live.

== Notable residents ==
- Isis Brantley, hair stylist and activist
