= Inji (singer) =

Turkish singer-songwriter (born 2001)

INJI
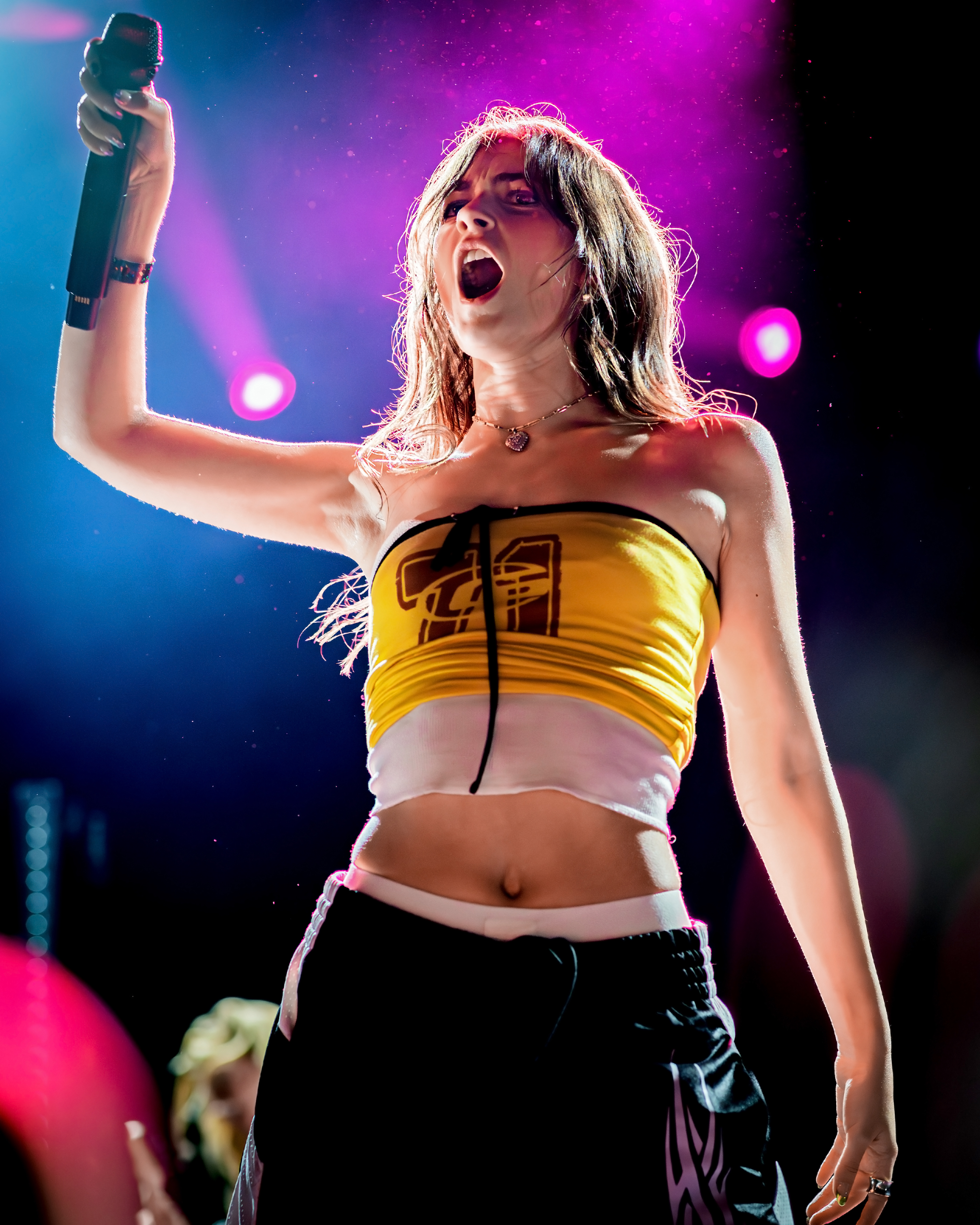
- INJI performing in 2024

Background information
- Born: İnci Gürün; January 2, 2001 (age 25); Istanbul, Turkey
- Genre: Pop
- Occupation: Singer-songwriter
- Years active: 2022–present
- Labels: Polydor; Astralwerks; AWAL
- Website: www.injiverse.com

İnci Gürün (born January 2, 2001), better known by her stage name INJI (stylized in all caps), is a Turkish rapper and singer currently based in New York City. She rose to prominence with her singles "Gaslight" and "Madeline", both of which went viral on TikTok in 2022. Her debut EP LFG was released on July 21, 2023.

== Early life and education ==
Gürün was born on January 2, 2001, in Istanbul, Türkiye. Her paternal grandfather, Orhan, founded the tugboat shipyard Sanmar Denizcilik, which is currently chaired by her father, Ali. Both men are guitarists, with Orhan working alongside singer and actress Seyyal Taner. Having loved music from a very young age, she enrolled in the Istanbul University State Conservatory at age 7 and studied music theory and classical piano.

Throughout the next ten years, Gürün competed in several piano competitions across Europe. After moving to the United Kingdom to attend Sevenoaks School, she began singing in jazz groups and choirs. This continued into her time at the Wharton School of the University of Pennsylvania, where she formed a jazz group and performed on the campus.

== Career ==
=== 2022: Gaslight, Madeline, and TikTok success ===
Gürün's first single, "Gaslight," was produced by fellow Penn student Alex Graf, who had previously been the drummer in her jazz project. The song was made "basically [...] in a week" with a beat Alex created in his dorm room. A demo of the song posted to TikTok went viral and propelled Gürün's popularity to reach some of the most popular creators on the website, including Charli D'Amelio and Bella Poarch. The song reached over 300,000 streams on Spotify in under two weeks.

INJI's sophomore single "Madeline" and accompanying music video received acclaim, which was further publicized by Gürün's appearance on TIDAL Rising and airplay on BBC Radio 1. Notably, the singer appeared on the Samsung miniseries Make It With Nile Rodgers, hosted by Nile Rodgers.

=== 2023–2024: The One, debut EP, and collaborations ===
Gürün's first release of the year, "The One", continued the singer's viral stardom. The song, described by Inji as "the new single girl anthem", was later remixed by Marc Kinchen and Lee Foss. "The One" was featured in eFootball (2025 Season). In addition, "Good Time Girl" was featured in EA Sports FC 26. LFG, Inji's debut EP, was released via Astralwerks on July 21, 2023.

On July 12, 2024, INJI released "Nice to Meet Ya" via AWAL Recordings, featuring Flyana Boss. The Swedish production duo NOTD and INJI released "Bruce Wayne" on October 18, 2024 via EMI Sweden.

=== 2025–present: Superlame and Bright Ideas ===
Gürün released the single "U WON'T!" on May 1, 2025 with an accompanying music video co-directed by Ana Peralta Chong. On September 30, 2025, Gürün collaborated with Demi Lovato on an official remix for "Here All Night".

SUPERLAME, Inji's debut mixtape, was released via AWAL on October 24, 2025. Later that year, INJI collaborated with Marshmello on "Kissin My Friends" released on December 5, 2025 via Joytime Collective. According to Comstock:

I've been waiting forever for the right person to do this. I saw INJI online and I was like, this girl's style, her swag, everything about her. Let me send a song to her and see if she wants to do it. As soon as she cut that first line, I was like, all right, this is it. This is perfect.

In July 2026, Gürün released the single "Bright Ideas" accompanied by a music video directed by Stone Taul. INJI also performed at the 2026 Lollapalooza Festival and opened for Zara Larsson during the Midnight Sun Tour in her hometown Istanbul.

== Influences ==
Gürün mentions jazz and blues musicians as a major factor in her style of songwriting, pointing to them being "so creative in the span of such a small space". The singer considers Amy Winehouse "her favorite artist in terms of storytelling". She is very open to experimentation in her music, saying "I'm not gonna say no to anything—you know, hyperpop, bring it on!" as a reply to her audience anticipating a hyperpop song.

== Discography ==
=== Mixtapes ===
List of mixtapes, with selected details
Title	Details
SUPERLAME	Released: October 24, 2025; Label: AWAL; Formats: LP, digital download, streaming

=== EPs ===
List of EPs, with selected details
Title	Details
LFG	Released: July 21, 2023; Label: Astralwerks; Formats: Digital download, streaming
WE GOOD	Released: September 13, 2024; Label: AWAL; Formats: Digital download, streaming

=== Singles ===
List of singles, with selected details
Title	Details
"Gaslight"	Released: April 14, 2022; Label: Self-released
"Madeline"	Released: September 9, 2022; Label: Polydor
"The One"	Released: January 19, 2023; Label: Polydor
"Bored"	Released: May 11, 2023; Label: Polydor
"Untz Untz"	Released: June 29, 2023; Label: Polydor
"Bellydancing"	Released: November 2, 2023; Label: Polydor
"Hate Your Guts"	Released: March 15, 2024; Label: Polydor
"Big Up"	Released: April 26, 2024; Label: Self-released
"Nice To Meet Ya" (with Flyana Boss)	Released: July 12, 2024; Label: AWAL Recordings
"Girlz"	Released: August 16, 2024; Label: AWAL
"Bruce Wayne" (with NOTD)	Released: October 18, 2024; Label: EMI Sweden, Universal
"Tell You Straight - INJI's Version" (with Jigitz)	Released: April 21, 2025; Label: R&R
"U Won't!"	Released: May 2, 2025; Label: AWAL
"Good Time Girl"	Released: June 6, 2025; Label: AWAL
"Boys Ain't Shit"	Released: July 25, 2025; Label: AWAL
"In a Mood"	Released: September 12, 2025; Label: AWAL
"Here All Night - INJI Remix" (with Demi Lovato)	Released: September 30, 2025; Label: DLG Recordings
"Kissin My Friends" (with Marshmello)	Released: October 5, 2025; Label: Joytime Collective
"Istanbul (slightly different)"	Released: December 4, 2025; Label: AWAL
"I Wanna Feel It All"	Released: June 12, 2026; Label: Run Things
"Bright Ideas"	Released: July 31, 2026; Label: Run Things
