= Chloe Jane =

- Born: June 11, 2003 (age 23); New York City, New York, United States
- Genres: Pop
- Occupations: Singer; DJ
- Website: chloe-jane.com

Chloe Jane (born June 11, 2003) is an American DJ and singer-songwriter. At the age of 13, she opened an act at Paris Hilton's kids charity event in Ibiza. Jane collaborated with Flyana Boss.
