= RAstar-class tugboat =

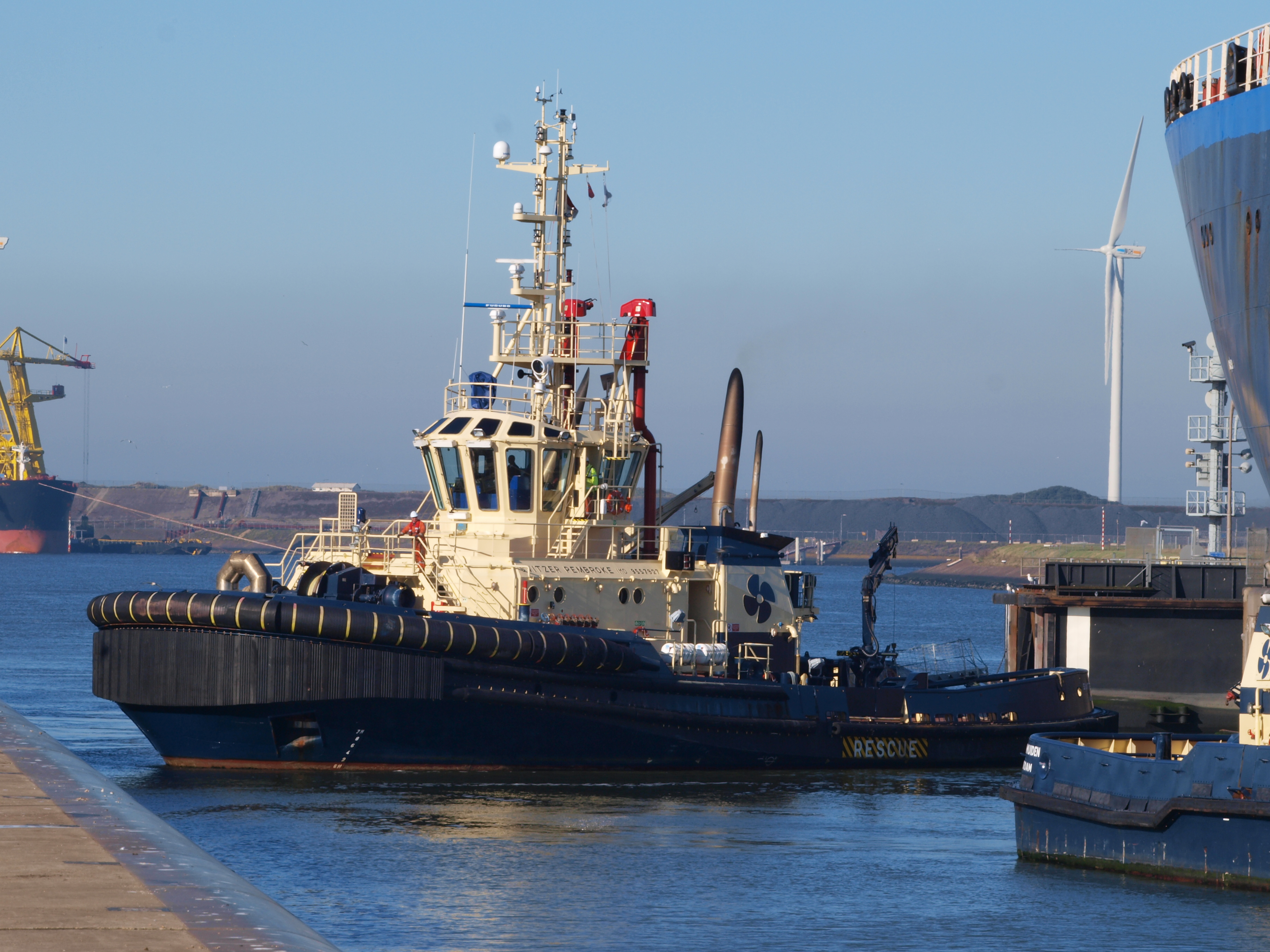
The Svitzer Pembroke, a RAstar 3600-W, pictured in the Port of Amsterdam in 2011.

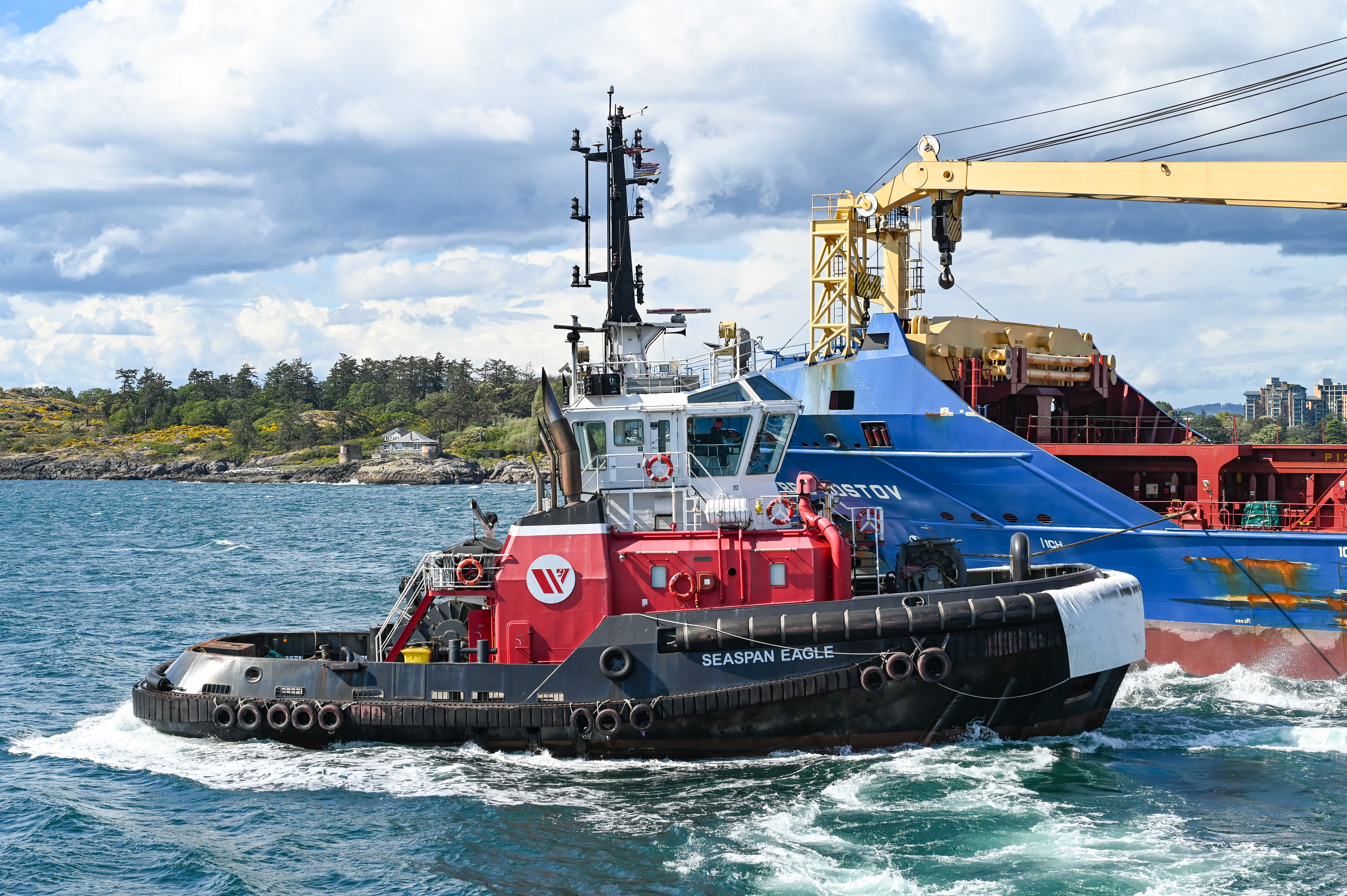
The Seaspan Eagle, a RAstar 2800 at Ogden Point in 2025.

RAstar is a class of tugboat designed by the Canadian company Robert Allan Ltd. The tugboats escort ships and help them berth.

== Series ==
RAstar-class tugboats have been released in several series.

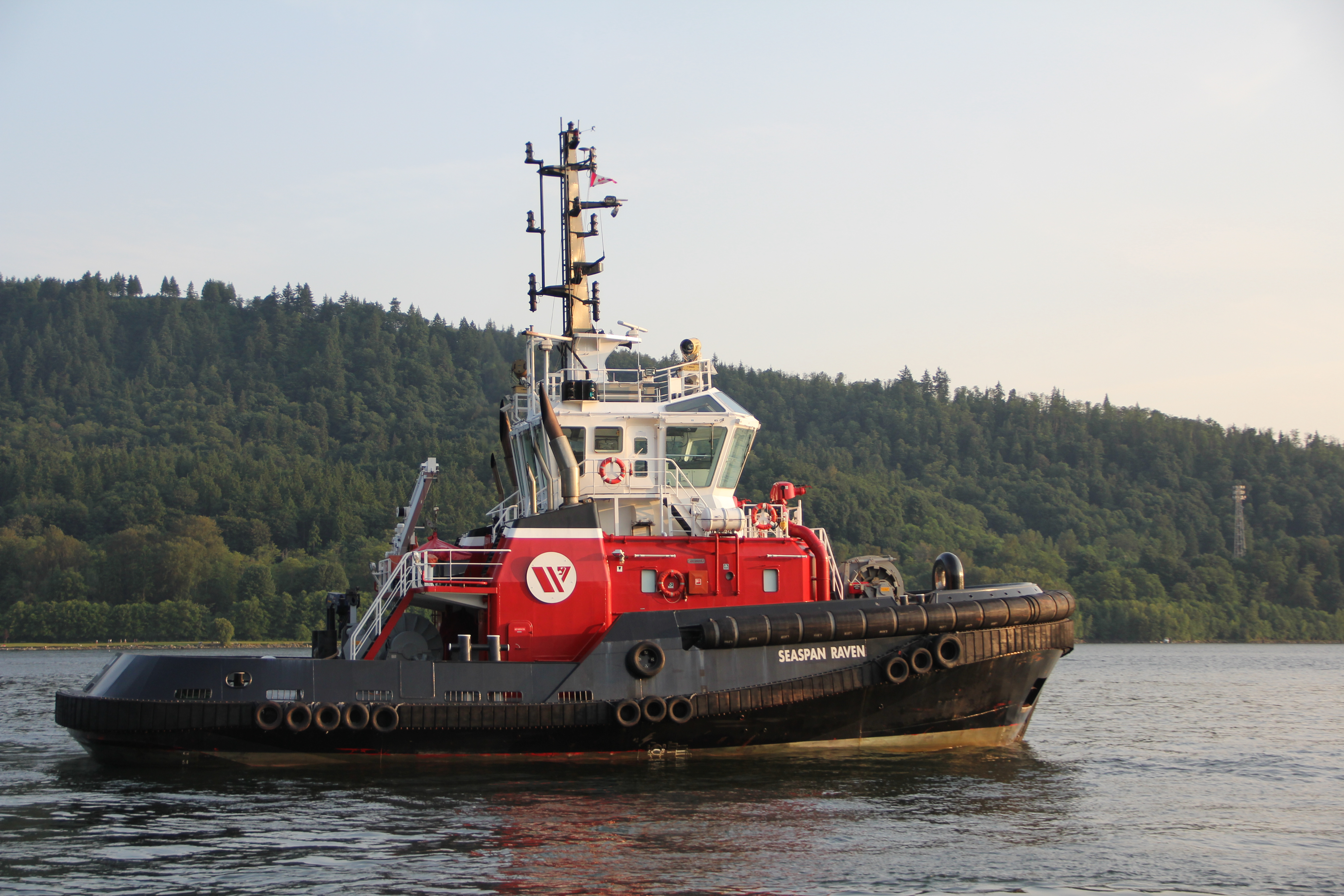
The Seaspan Raven, pictured in 2012.

=== RAstar 2800 ===
The RAstar 2800 was produced from 2010. Four tugs of this series were ordered by Seaspan for work in the Port of Vancouver. The Seaspan Raven, Seaspan Eagle, Seaspan Kestrel, and Seaspan Osprey were delivered in that order between 2010 and 2012. The ships were built by a Turkish firm, Sanmar Denizcilik. Subsequently, Svitzer ordered six RAstar 2800 tugs from the same company in 2015.

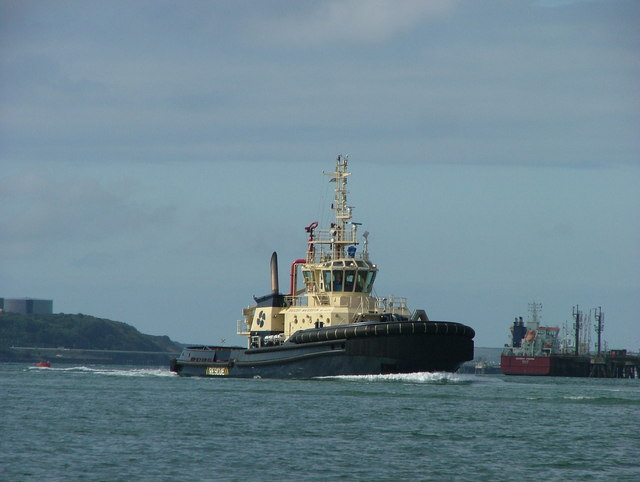
The Svitzer Waterston, a RAstar 3400, pictured near Milford Haven in 2009.

RAstar 2800 tugboats have a length overall of 28.2 metres (93 ft) and a beam (width) of 12.6 metres (41 ft), and are equipped with diesel engines.
