= Por cesárea =

Studio album by Dillom
- Released: 26 April 2024
- Recorded: 2022–2024
- Studio: Panda; El Árbol; Coco; Sonorámica; Delta Sound Lodge
- Genre: Trip hop; abstract hip hop; rock; experimental
- Length: 35:28
- Label: Bohemian Groove
- Producer: Fermín; Lamadrid

Dillom chronology
Ad honorem, Vol. 1 (2023)	Por cesárea (2024)

Por cesárea (transl. Caesarean section) is the second studio album by Argentine singer, rapper and record producer Dillom. It was released on 26 April 2024 and includes collaborations with Andrés Calamaro and Lali.

== Background and composition ==
Dillom released his debut studio album, Post Mortem, on 1 December 2021 to critical acclaim. He later embarked on the Post Mortem Tour across Latin America and Spain, including gigs at Lollapalooza, Cosquín Rock and Primavera Sound, as well as headlining sets at Movistar Arena, Luna Park and Teatro Vorterix. While on tour and working on his second album, Dillom collaborated with pop duo Miranda!, rapper and singer Wos and released "Ola de suicidios", a post-punk number that caused controversy for its lyrical content. He also surprise-released the Ad honorem, Vol. 1 EP, which included collaborations with Il Quentín and Mechayrxmeo.

On 22 April 2024, Dillom announced on social media the title and release date of his second studio album, Por cesárea. He began working on the album during the Post Mortem Tour in Barcelona as a "script" from which the songs would later develop. Back in Argentina, he reunited with Fermín Ugarte and Luis Tomás Lamadrid at Delta Sound Lodge in the city of Tigre and took "a year and a half" to complete the album.

Por cesárea was finally released on 26 April 2024.

== Lyrics and music ==
Por cesárea is a "cinematic" concept album about "the tortuous mental deterioration of a young man," dealing with themes such as violence, obsession, drug abuse and trauma. It was described as a "psychological thriller soundtrack" and "rock opera", compared to Pink Floyd's The Wall (1979) and Charly García's La hija de la lágrima (1994) due to its "homogenous" storytelling and structure. Musically, Por cesárea is mostly a trip hop album with elements of abstract hip hop, rock and experimental music and was compared to acts such as Pixies, Blur, The Stooges, Bee Gees, Frank Ocean, Tyler, the Creator, Kendrick Lamar, Brockhampton, Nine Inch Nails, Beastie Boys, Nirvana and Soundgarden.

Por césarea opens with "Últimamente", a "dramatic" trip hop song that "bases the concept [of the album]" and "narrates the suicide attempt of a mother." The following tracks, "La novia de mi amigo" and "Cirugía" were described as "twisted love songs." "Cirugía" displays "dark and problematic romanticism" and its lyrics compared to The Police's "Every Breath You Take" (1983). Fourth track "Mi peor enemigo" features Argentine rock musician Andrés Calamaro and opens with a sampled trumpet solo by Jerry González. "(Mentiras Piadosas)" features uncredited vocals by Brooke Carrey and "functions as an interlude and [sets the tone]" for the following song, sixth track "La carie". It features Argentine pop singer Lali covering the opening lines of "Plegaria desvelada" (1976) by author and composer María Elena Walsh, as well as an orchestral outro directed by Alejandro Terán.

== Reception ==
Por cesárea was positively received upon release. Giuliana Luchetti from La Voz described the album as "risky, disruptive and visceral [...] Dillom's magnum opus." Writing for Infobae, Ezequiel Ruiz lauded Por cesárea as "one of the best Argentine [albums] of the century", while popular radio station FM Rock & Pop 95.9 called it "a work of art". Juan Cruz Revello from Data Diario described the project as "cinematic" and "a lyrical and sonorous statement about real-life, contemporary emotional instability." Lucas Santomero from Indie Hoy observed "an overwhelming musical growth" and described Dillom's "enfant terrible" character as "more sensible, profound and twisted" in comparison to his debut. El Planteo complimented Dillom as "a cultural innovator" and stated that Por cesárea "explores new musical and narrative dimensions, showcasing palpable growth in his style and artistic focus."

== Tracklist ==
All tracks produced by Fermín Ugarte and Luis Tomás Lamadrid.

Por cesárea
No.	Title	Writer(s)	Length
1.	"Últimamente" (transl. "Lately")	Dylan León Masa; Ugarte; Franco Dolzani; Juan Gabriel López; Lucas Solovera Araya; Lamadrid	3:25
2.	"La novia de mi amigo" (transl. "My Friend's Girlfriend")	Masa; Ugarte; Dolzani; López; Araya; Lamadrid	3:24
3.	"Cirugía" (transl. "Surgery")	Masa; Ugarte; López; Iván Cetkovich Bakmas; Lamadrid; Manuel Montenegro	3:36
4.	"Mi peor enemigo" (transl. "My Worst Enemy"; with Andrés Calamaro)	Masa; Calamaro; Ugarte; López; Bakmas; Lamadrid; Montenegro	3:57
5.	"(Mentiras Piadosas)" (transl. "White Lies")	Masa; Ugarte; López; Iván Cetkovich Bakmas; Lamadrid; Manuel Montenegro	1:16
6.	"La carie" (transl. "Caries"; with Lali)	Masa; Ugarte; López; Lamadrid; María Elena Walsh	2:39
7.	"Buenos tiempos" (transl. "Good Times")	Masa; Ugarte; Bakmas; López; Lamadrid; Montenegro	3:03
8.	"Muñecas" (transl. "Wrists")	Masa; Ugarte; Dolzani; López; Araya; Lamadrid	2:14
9.	"(Irreversible)"	Masa; Ugarte; Lamadrid	3:00
10.	"Coyote"	Masa; Ugarte; Bakmas; López; Lamadrid; Montenegro	1:48
11.	"Reiki y yoga" (transl. "Reiki and Yoga")	Masa; Ugarte; Dolzani; López; Araya; Lamadrid	3:13
12.	"Ciudad de la Paz" (transl. "City of Peace")	Masa; Ugarte; Bakmas; Lamadrid	3:47
Total length:			35:28
