= The Vandalist =

Studio album by Noga Erez
- Released: 20 September 2024
- Genres: Pop; alternative rock; EDM; hip-hop
- Length: 44:55
- Languages: English; Hebrew; Spanish
- Labels: Neon Gold; Atlantic
- Producers: Ori Rousso; Justin Raisen; Noga Erez

Noga Erez chronology
Kids (2021)	The Vandalist (2024)

Singles from The Vandalist
- 1. "PC People" Released: 5 June 2024; 2. "Ayayay" Released: 17 July 2024; 3. "Godmother" Released: 21 August 2024; 4. "Sad Generation, Happy Pictures" Released: 20 September 2024

Professional ratings
Review scores
Source	Rating
Musikexpress	5.5/6 stars
Uncut	8/10

The Vandalist is the third studio album by Israeli singer-songwriter Noga Erez and her first major label release, with Neon Gold Records and Atlantic Records. The album features a number of collaborations with artists such as Robbie Williams, Eden Ben Zaken, Ravid Plotnik, Dillom and Flyana Boss. The album was released on 20 September 2024.

== Background ==
According to Erez, the album, which has satirical themes, is an attempt "not to take it all so seriously, whether the devastating state of the world, social media, work or relationships".

Recording and composition of the album included five months in Madrid, Spain. After a day of recording, Erez and producer/partner Ori Rousso would return home to watch classic films and feel inspired, attempting to bring that inspiration into the music. The track "Godmother" was inspired from watching the Godfather trilogy in Madrid. They recorded the song months later in New York City and also used an Indian film sample.

They were also inspired by the reggaeton that they were hearing in Spain. Through an Argentine national they were introduced to the Argentine rapper, Dillom, and recorded "Ayayay" with him.

The album's first single, "PC People", is a tongue-in-cheek take on the extremes of woke and cancel culture. Erez urges fellow liberals of the need for "an authentic exchange of ideas and dialogue."

Initially the album was going to focus on themes of relationships and love. Erez changed focus and "Come Back Home" was one of the few to retain the theme. Erez has since seen the context and meaning of the song changed in the context of the October 7 attacks, as Israeli families await the return of their loved ones, amid the Gaza war and the Gaza war hostage crisis.

The collaboration with Robbie Williams came about following the pair's performance together at Williams' concert in Tel Aviv in June 2023 and Williams being a fan of Erez.

The making of the album was documented in the upcoming yesDOCU documentary, Noga. The film, directed by Benji and Jono Bergmann, delves into producing an album amid complex personal and geopolitical challenges.

== Track listing ==
All tracks are written by Noga Erez with others noted. All tracks are produced by Ori Rousso with others noted.

The Vandalist – standard edition track listing
No.	Title	Writer(s)	Producer(s)	Length
1.	"Vandalist"	Ori Rousso; Justin Raisen; Trevor Smith; Jimmy Seals	Erez; Raisen	3:28
2.	"Dumb"			2:16
3.	"PC People" (featuring Rousso)	Rousso; Raisen		3:11
4.	"Come Back Home"	Rousso; CJ Baran	Erez; Baran	2:39
5.	"A+" (featuring Ravid Plotnik)			2:46
6.	"Ayayay" (featuring Dillom)	Rousso; Dylan Leon Masa; Baran		2:59
7.	"Smiling Upside Down"			3:17
8.	"Hey, Hi"			0:17
9.	"Sad Generation, Happy Pictures" (featuring Flyana Boss)	Rousso; Omer Lavon; Bobbi Lanea Taylor; Folayan Omi Kunerede		3:27
10.	"Nogastein"			2:41
11.	"Godmother" (featuring Eden Ben Zaken)	Rousso		3:11
12.	"Police"			3:02
13.	"P.L.E.A.S.E"			2:47
14.	"Danny" (featuring Robbie Williams)			3:49
15.	"Mind Show"			3:08
16.	"Oh, Thank You!"			1:39
Total length:				44:55

== Charts ==
Chart performance for The Vandalist
Chart (2024)	Peak position
German Albums (Offizielle Top 100)	34
