= Kids (Noga Erez album) =

Studio album by Noga Erez
- Released: 26 March 2021
- Recorded: 2017–2020
- Genres: Pop; alternative rock; EDM; hip-hop
- Length: 36:35
- Label: City Slang
- Producer: Ori Rousso

Noga Erez chronology
| Off the Radar (2017) | Kids (2021) | The Vandalist (2024) |

Singles from Kids
- 1. "Views" Released: 24 February 2020; 2. "No News On TV" Released: 23 June 2020; 3. "You So Done" Released: 26 August 2020; 4. "End of the Road" Released: 13 January 2021; 5. "Story" Released: 9 March 2021

Kids is the second studio album by Israeli singer-songwriter Noga Erez. The album was released on 26 March 2021, by City Slang. A companion album titled Kids (Against the Machine) was released on 5 November 2021.

== Background ==
Erez stated that she finished working on the album a year before its release, but its release was postponed due to the COVID-19 pandemic. The album was produced by Erez's partner, producer Ori Rousso, who also produced her previous album, Off the Radar.

Erez described the process of creating the album, and said that "right after we finished Off the Radar and went on a tour we had some problems with the family and Ori's mother passed away. […] For a while we knew that the album would only deal with In this subject, in the perspective that there is a mother and then there isn't; the same deep connection between parents and their children; and how generations pass on knowledge, but also issues and how this connection is important." She added that "the reason we called the Kids album was because we thought this whole album was going to be about that. But then life happened and it took us three years to finish the album, and so many different things happened during that time. We started leaning towards more topics."

== Promotion ==
=== Singles ===
The single from the album, "Views", featuring Rousso and Reo Cragun, was released on 24 February 2020. The second single from the album, "No News on TV", was released on 23 June. It was followed by the third single, "You So Done", on 26 August. The fourth single, "End of the Road", was released on 13 January 2021. On 9 March, along with the release of the album and its name and early sale on the iTunes Store, the fifth single, "Story", was released featuring Rousso.

=== Shows ===
The album was preceded by an online streaming show, which took place on 1 and 2 April 2021. In addition, a tour supported the album in North America and Europe, from 31 July 2021, to 8 March 2022. On 12 April 2021, she appeared on Jimmy Kimmel Live! with the song "Views".

== Critical reception ==
Professional ratings
Aggregate scores
| Source | Rating |
|---|---|
| Metacritic | 76/100 |
Review scores
| Source | Rating |
| AllMusic | 4/5 stars |
| Clash | 8/10 |
| i | 4/5 stars |
| Mojo | 3/5 stars |

The album received mostly positive reviews. On Metacritic, the album received a weighted average score of 76 out of 100, based on 7 professional reviews.

On AllMusic, the album received a positive review, stating that the album "With Kids, Erez makes a significant leap forward from Off the Radar. Though she still sounds like an outsider, the skill she displays on these songs suggest she shouldn't be one for long."

Clash stated that "[The album] is Restless and fast-paced, 'Kids' nurtures critical reflection without compromising humour and a good time. The songs are energetic and invigorating, a vocal punch right in your face."

On the Quietus, the album received a score of 90 out of 100, saying that "you will not hear a better pop album this year. I doubt you will hear a better rap album this year."

Writing for The Line of Best Fit, Daniel Cummings described Kids (Against the Machine) as "the [album] fans wanted to hear" following the "somewhat disappointing" production of the original release.

== In popular culture ==
The song 'End of the Road' was used in the soundtrack of the Netflix series Half Bad season 1 episode 5.

== Track listing ==
| No. | Title | Length |
|---|---|---|
| 1. | "KTD" | 0:10 |
| 2. | "Cipi" | 3:07 |
| 3. | "Views (Feat. Reo Cragun, Rousso)" | 2:45 |
| 4. | "You So Done" | 2:40 |
| 5. | "End of the Road" | 2:39 |
| 6. | "Bark Loud" | 3:12 |
| 7. | "Kids (Feat. Blimes)" | 4:10 |
| 8. | "Story (Feat. Rousso)" | 3:11 |
| 9. | "Knockout" | 2:45 |
| 10. | "No News on TV (Feat. Rousso)" | 3:05 |
| 11. | "Fire Kites" | 3:11 |
| 12. | "Candyman" | 2:19 |
| 13. | "Switch Me Off" | 3:15 |
| Total length: | | 36:36 |

Bonus Tracks
| No. | Title | Length |
|---|---|---|
| 14. | "Sunday" | 2:07 |
| Total length: | | 38:43 |
