= Dillom =

Argentine rapper (born 2000)

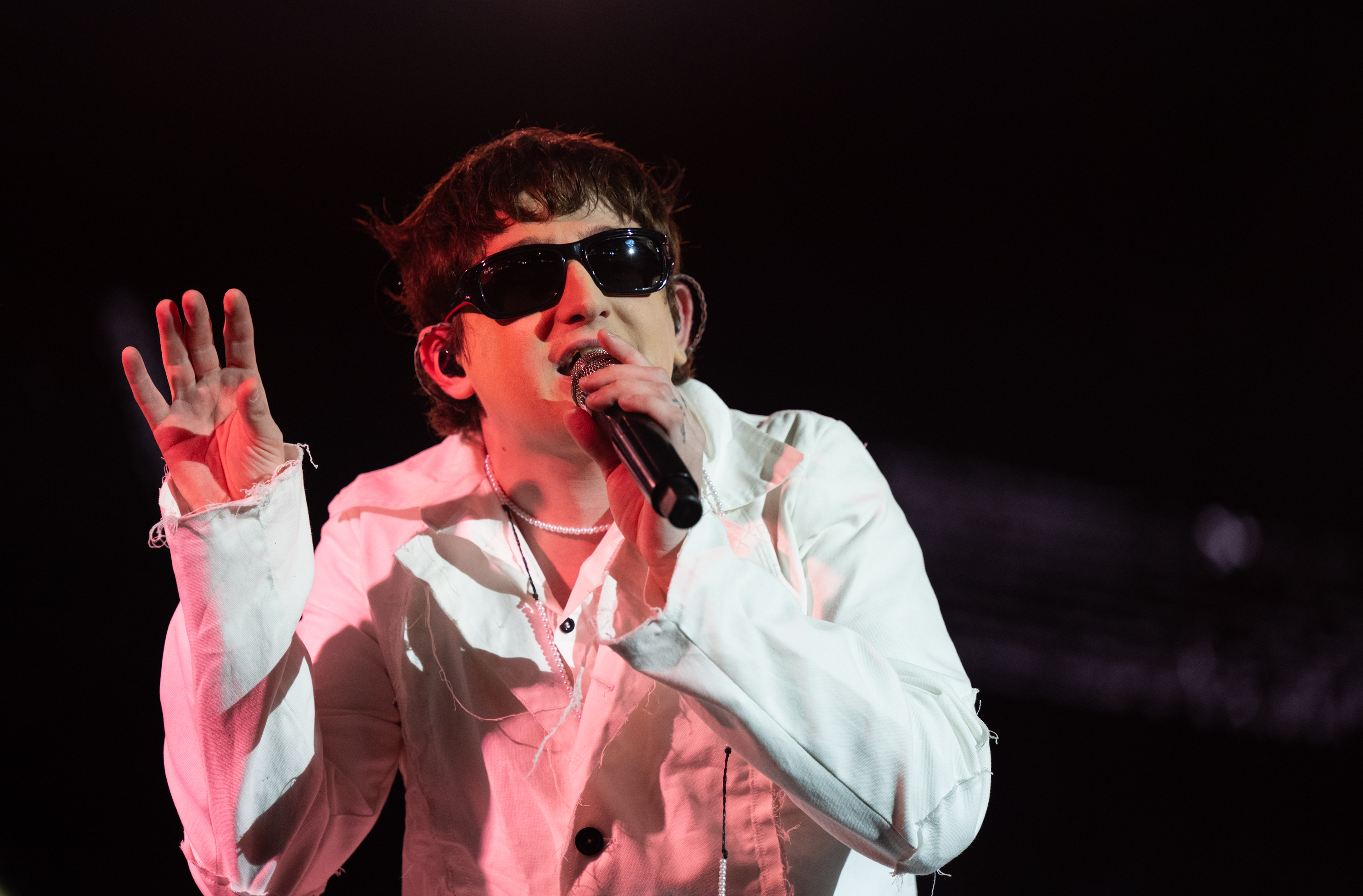
- Dillom in 2025

Background information
- Born: Dylan León Masa; 5 December 2000 (age 25); Buenos Aires, Argentina
- Genres: Rock; trap; punk; pop; hardcore hip hop; horrorcore; drill
- Occupations: Rapper, singer, songwriter, producer
- Instruments: Vocals; bass; keyboards
- Years active: 2018–present
- Label: Bohemian Groove

Dylan León Masa (born 5 December 2000), known professionally as Dillom, is an Argentine music artist. Based in Buenos Aires, he rose to fame in 2018 with the self-produced track "Dripping". One of the most prominent figures in the "second wave of Argentine trap", he is known for his "saturated, euphoric" sound and "raw" lyricism. His debut album, Post Mortem, was released in 2021.

== Early life ==
Dillom was born on 5 December 2000, in Balvanera, Buenos Aires and was raised in Colegiales by his parents. They divorced when he was only 8 years old. His mother became addicted to drugs and eventually ended up in jail. This situation made Dillom move in with his father, who had converted to Orthodox Judaism and was living with his new girlfriend. During an interview with El Planteo, he described living with his father negatively: "They went full-on old-fashioned, Orthodox, and I've never been an Orthodox. In fact, I wasn't even Jewish [...] They suddenly made me follow their customs, didn't let me use my phone or do homework on Fridays because it was Shabbat." Their troubled relationship made his father kick him out of his house. Dillom slept in a plaza and later moved in with a friend.

== Career ==
Dillom said to be interested in pursuing a music career since he was a child. He was a bassist in a punk band and, at age 15, produced hip hop beats and instrumentals for local rappers in Villa 31, a villa miseria in Retiro. This was his first encounter with urban music, a style he would later use for his own compositions. In 2018, he released his debut single "Dripping" and founded the creative team Rip Gang alongside artists Ill Quentín, Muerejoven, Odd Mami, Taichu and Saramalacara. He would later release "Superglue", "Draco", "Casipegado" and collaborated with producer and DJ Bizarrap on "Bzrp Music Sessions Vol. 9", turning him into a viral phenomenon. The Rip Gang marked a "new wave of Argentine trap", causing outrage among earlier rappers, particularly Duki. Fans of the "first wave" disapproved of newer musicians, making Dillom's session with Bizarrap the producer's most disliked video on YouTube.

In 2020, Dillom was featured on Russian punk rock band Pussy Riot's "1312". He founded his own record label, Bohemian Groove, and released his most successful solo single, "Dudade". As of September 2022, the song amassed over 38 million streams on Spotify and over 41 million on YouTube. During an interview with Indie Hoy, Dillom confessed that he didn't like the song initially, although he "felt that people would like it".

In January 2021, Dillom released "Sauce" as a stand-alone single. The song was noted for its funk production, marking a departure from his usual trap sound. In March, he collaborated with cumbia sensation L-Gante on "Tinty Nasty". The song proved to be a hit, peaking at No. 15 on Billboard Hot 100 Argentina and amassing 87 million views on YouTube and 26 million streams on Spotify. They would later become friends, with Dillom expressing admiration for L-Gante's lyricism and sense of humor. In May, he released "Opa" as the lead single from his upcoming debut album Post Mortem. He also released "Piso 13" and "Pelotuda" as second and third singles, respectively, to critical acclaim. In November, the album cover and release date were revealed on social media. Post Mortem was finally released on December 1, 2021.

In February 2022, Dillom kicked off the Post Mortem Tour at Cosquín Rock Festival in Córdoba, Argentina. On 18 March 2022, he performed at Lollapalooza Argentina. In August, Dillom collaborated with Argentine pop duo Miranda! on their single "Dos".

While working on his second album, Dillom collaborated with multiple Argentine artists such as Wos and Juan Lopez. He also released standalone single "Ola de suicidios" and the Ad honorem EP (2023), which included collaborations with Ill Quentin and MECHAYRXMEO.

On April 23 2024, Dillom announced his second studio album Por cesárea, to be released April 26.

He features on "AYAYAY", a track with Israeli singer, Noga Erez, on her album, The Vandalist, released in September 2024.

== Artistry ==
Dillom's music is mostly categorized as Latin trap, although he doesn't relate to the term. During an interview with La Capital, he expressed his disagreement with labels in music. His lyrics were described by Forbes as "elaborate" and "bilingual", packed with pop culture references and "sordid" storytelling. They also depicted him as the "Latino Eminem". When asked about the explicit nature of his lyrics and cancel culture, Dillom said that "art should be a little offending or it would be boring", although he also expressed that "there should be cleverness behind [an offensive line] [...] If it's just an unfunny joke only meant to offend, you're a jerk."

Dillom has said to be influenced by Lil Uzi Vert, 21 Savage, Tyler, the Creator, Daft Punk, Pharrell Williams, Marvin Gaye, Chic, Bee Gees, The Ramones, AC/DC, Snoop Dogg, Cypress Hill, among others. In his songs, he mentions a variety of musicians such as Tame Impala, Elvis Presley, Lil Pump, B.B. King and Red Hot Chili Peppers. His image and visuals are heavily influenced by horror films, most notably A Nightmare on Elm Street, The Texas Chainsaw Massacre, Poltergeist and Chucky. He also describes himself as a "character that reflects [his] most mundane side, the evil side that we all have".

== Discography ==
=== Albums ===
List of studio albums with selected details
Title	Studio album details
Post Mortem	Released: 1 December 2021; Label: Bohemian Groove; Formats: Digital download, streaming
Por Cesárea	Released: 26 April 2024; Label: Bohemian Groove; Formats: Digital download, streaming
La Nueva Violencia	Released: 12 August 2026

=== EPs ===
List of studio albums with selected details
Title	EP details
Ad Honorem, Vol. 1	Released: 11 October 2023; Label: Bohemian Groove; Formats: Digital download, streaming
Portal Sessions (with Santiago Motorizado)	Released: 28 November 2024; Label: Self-released; Formats: Streaming

=== Singles ===
==== As lead artist ====
List of singles as lead artist, showing selected chart positions, and associated albums
Title	Year	Peaks	Album
Title	Year	ARG	Album
"Dripping"	2018	—	Non-album singles
"Keloke" (featuring Peco)	2018	—	Non-album singles
"Superglue" (featuring Ill Quentín)	2019	—	Non-album singles
"Draco"	2019	—	Non-album singles
"Casipegado" (featuring Muerejoven and Kuribo)	2019	—	Non-album singles
"A$AP" (featuring Muerejoven and Haipe)	2019	—	Non-album singles
"Kelly" (featuring Muerejoven and KAKTOV)	2020	—	Non-album singles
"Dudade" (featuring Evar and Omar Varela)	2020	54	Non-album singles
"Sauce" (featuring Punga and Fermin)	2021	—	Non-album singles
"Opa"	2021	—	Post Mortem
"Piso 13"	2021	—	Post Mortem
"Pelotuda"	2021	—	Post Mortem
"La Primera"	2021	—	Post Mortem
"Rocketpowers" (with Saramalacara)	2022	—	Post Mortem
"Ola de Suicidios"	2023	—	Non-album single
"Minimi"	2023	—	Ad Honorem, Vol. 1
"Cirugía"	2024	64	Por Cesárea
"Buenos Tiempos"	2024	88	Por Cesárea
"—" denotes a recording that did not chart or was not released in that territory.

==== As a featured artist ====
List of singles as lead artist, showing selected chart positions, and associated albums
Title	Year	Peaks	Album
Title	Year	ARG	Album
"Dillom: Bzrp Music Sessions, Vol. 9" (with Bizarrap)	2019	—	Non-album singles
"Waxx" (with K4 and Lepa)	2019	—	Non-album singles
"Aspen" (with Chiki Wanted)	2019	—	Non-album singles
"Do Re Mi" (with Pimp Flaco and Blackthoven)	2019	—	Non-album singles
"Viernes 13" (with Kaktov and Fat Nick)	2019	—	Non-album singles
"Rapido" (with Moloko)	2020	—	Non-album singles
"1312" (with Pussy Riot and Muerejoven)	2020	—	Non-album singles
"223" (with Esbabyface)	2020	—	Nueva Galaxia
"Tinty Nasty" (with L-Gante, DT.Billardo and Omar Varela)	2021	15	Non-album single
"Organiko" (with Broke Carrey)	2022	—	Buenos Aires Motel
"Dos" (with Miranda!)	2022	81	Non-album singles
"Latas" (with K4 and Proyecto Gomez Casa)	2022	—	Non-album singles
"Mala" (with Mhtresuno)	2023	—	De La Villa Pal Mundo
"Me Siento Solo" (with Juan Lopez)	2023	—	Culiado
"Cabezas Cromadas" (with Wos)|	2023	—	Descartable
"Ayayay" (Noga Erez featuring Dillom)	2023	—	The Vandalist
"El Morocho, El Rubio y El Colo" (with AgusFortnine2008 and Stiffy)	2024	—	Hacelos Concha Agus
"Tócame" (Six Sex featuring Dillom)	2025	—	X-Sex
"33" (with Lali)	2025	29	No Vayas a Atender Cuando El Demonio Llama
"—" denotes a recording that did not chart or was not released in that territory.

== Awards and nominations ==
Award	Year	Category	Nominated work	Result	Ref.
Latin Grammy Awards	2024	Best Alternative Music Album	Por Cesárea	Nominated	
Premios Gardel	2024	Besy Urban Song	"Minimi"	Nominated	
Premios Gardel	2024	Best Music Video	"Ola de Suicidios"	Nominated	
UK Music Video Awards	2025	Best Low Budget Video	"El Morocho, el Rubio y el Colo" (with Swaggerboyz)	Nominated	
