= Off the Radar =

Studio album by Noga Erez
- Released: 2 June 2017
- Studios: Dorit Studios and Avner Studios, Tel Aviv
- Genres: EDM; experimental pop; electropop; alternative pop; R&B; industrial
- Length: 39:23
- Label: City Slang
- Producers: Noga Erez; Ori Rousso; Eitan Reiter

Noga Erez chronology
Off the Radar (2017)	Kids (2021)

Singles from Off the Radar
- 1. "Dance While You Shoot" Released: 2 November 2016; 2. "Pity" Released: 1 February 2017; 3. "Toy" Released: 28 February 2017; 4. "Off The Radar" Released: 4 April 2017

Off the Radar is the debut studio album by Israeli pop musician Noga Erez, released on 2 June 2017 by the label City Slang. Erez started her career with intentions of only releasing singles, but the similarity of themes in the songs she was writing and being signed to City Slang convinced her to have a full-length album in her discography. Off The Radar was compared by multiple critics to the works of acts such as M.I.A., FKA Twigs, Björk, and Grimes and was labeled by Erez as "very high rhythmic dancey music with political content." It lyrically depicts her PJ Harvey-inspired personal and emotional takes on world problems such as surveillance, media manipulation, sexual assault, and social media. Among its sound design and production, the record's use of controversial political subject matter alongside fun music styles helped the album garner critical acclaim upon its distribution. Off The Radar was promoted with four single releases ("Dance While You Shoot", "Pity", "Toy", and "Off The Radar") and six music videos that were directed by Erez as well as other talents such as Zhang + Knight, Hen Makhluf, Eden Kalif, Daniella Meroz, and Omri Ben Shalom.

== Background ==
Erez started her career in electronic music releasing singles and having no intentions of having a full-length album in her discography. However, that changed when City Slang, a German label that noticed Erez's 2014 cover of the song "Weapons" by Son Lux, signed her in the summer of 2016 and both she and her production partner Ori Rousso noticed common themes in all the songs they were writing and producing. Thus, Off the Radar was released on 2 June 2017.

== Production and composition ==
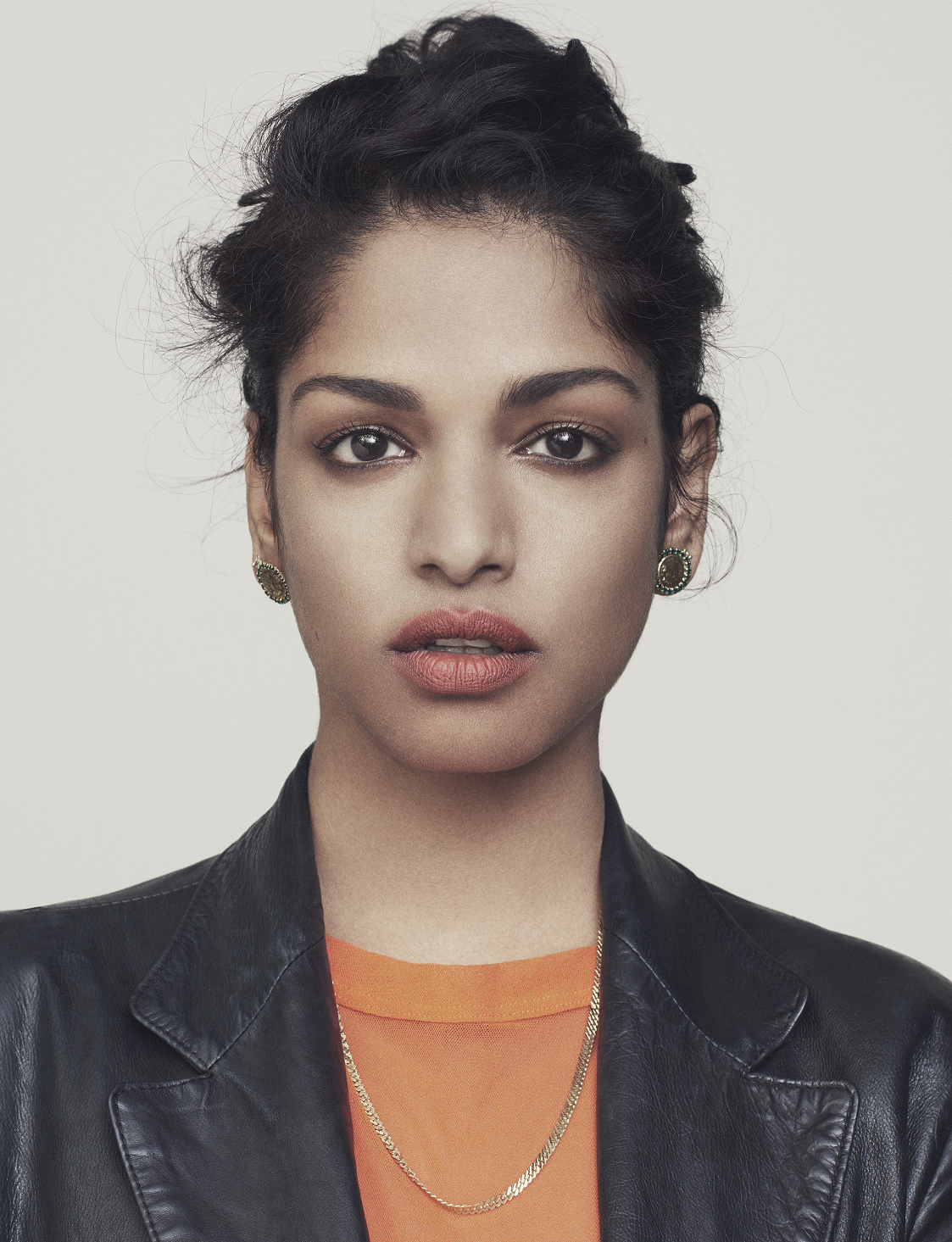
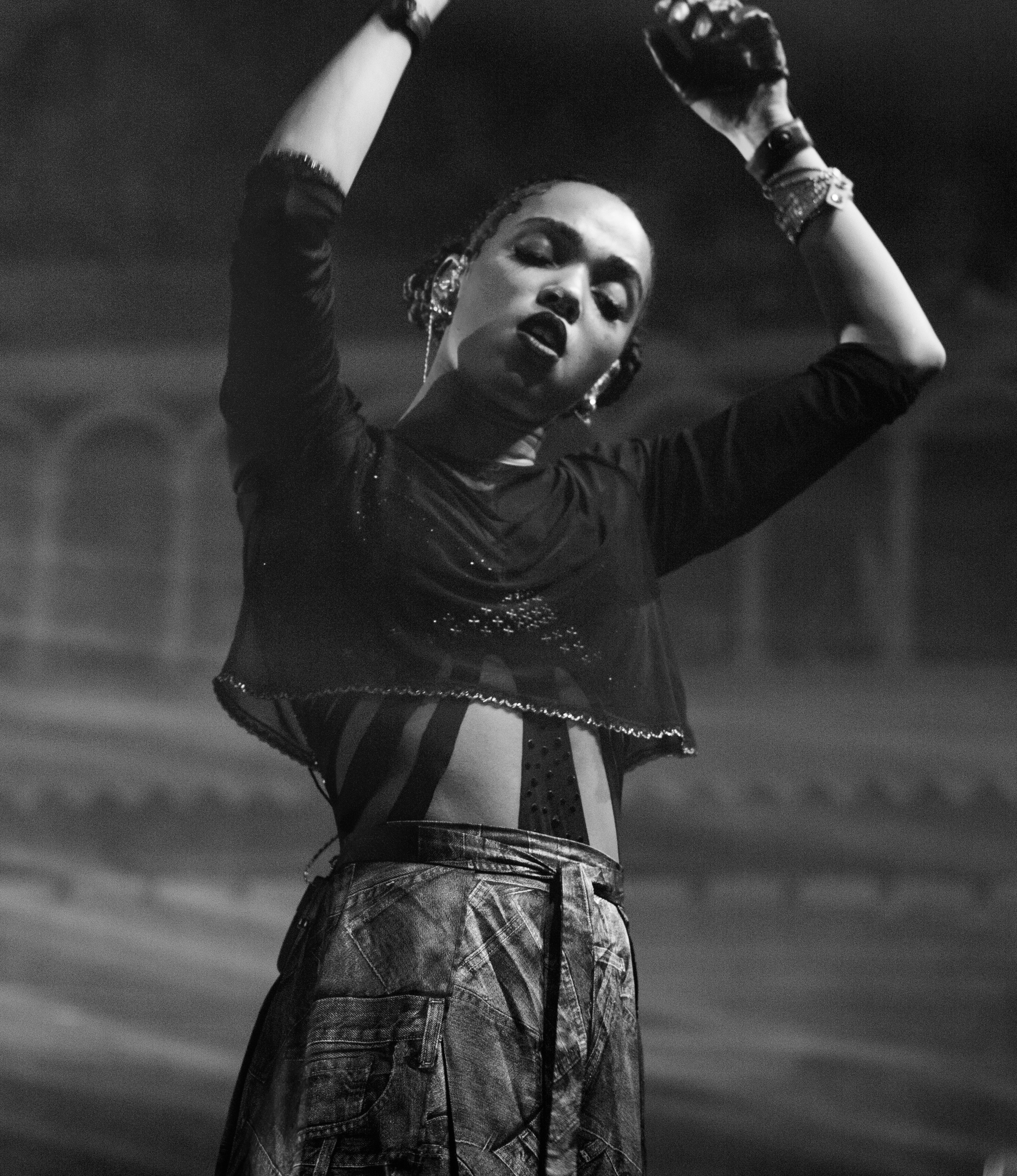
Off The Radar garnered numerous comparisons by critics to the works of M.I.A. (left) and FKA Twigs (right).

Off The Radar is a set of ten full-length tracks, three short "passage" tracks ("Quiet One", "Hit U", and "A Hit Is A Hit"), and a passage played in two parts ("Instruction" and "Side Effect"). The passages serve to prepare the listener for the following song. Erez herself categorized Off The Radar as "very high rhythmic dancey music with political content." Noisey labeled it as an experimental pop album, and NPR Music categorized it as an electropop record in the vein of Sylvan Esso. Kate Hutchinson of The Observer wrote some of the album's "jerky" instrumentals have "an escapist ebullience about them, all neon sharpie synths and catherine wheels of electronic bloops", and "others an oppressive, danceable dread."

All of the songs were written for more than two years and recorded and mixed in the Tel Aviv-based Dorit Studios and Even Yehuda-based Avner Studios. For most of the tracks on Off The Radar, the instrumental was made first and the lyrics came afterwards. Mixing was near completed by December 2016. Some of the sounds were tracked outside of the studios. The glass-breaking foley on "Toy" was recorded at a recycling place, where Erez and Rousso threw the bottles in a bin that gave the glass breaks an echo effect. Critic Michael Sumsion described the sounds on the album as "extremely personal and informed by experience whilst suffused with wigged-out flourishes of microscopic deftness." He analyzed that "the fractured and unwieldy blurts, burps, bass blasts, whooshes and clanks embedded in her jerky arrangements are presented with a brio that confounds as much as it communicates, wringing agitation as well as catharsis from its ominous, chaotic soundscape."

Flying Lotus, Thundercat, Kendrick Lamar, Vince Staples, Björk, Frank Ocean, Little Simz, M.I.A., St. Vincent, FKA Twigs, and Grimes were heavy influences of the album's sound, Erez particularly highlighting FKA Twigs and Grimes as "massive influence[s] in terms of creating so much more beyond [their] music." In fact, Off The Radar garnered the most comparisons to the works of M.I.A. and FKA Twigs from critics, the former due to its socio-political commentary, Erez's sing-talking performance, and what writer Bella Todda described as "clattering rhythms" and "wonk-pop hooks," and the latter for its "broken beats," (as described by Noisey) vocal processing, and "cinematic sparseness" (as labeled by Hutchinson). The album's sound was also commonly compared by reviewers to Björk and Grimes.

== Lyrics and themes ==
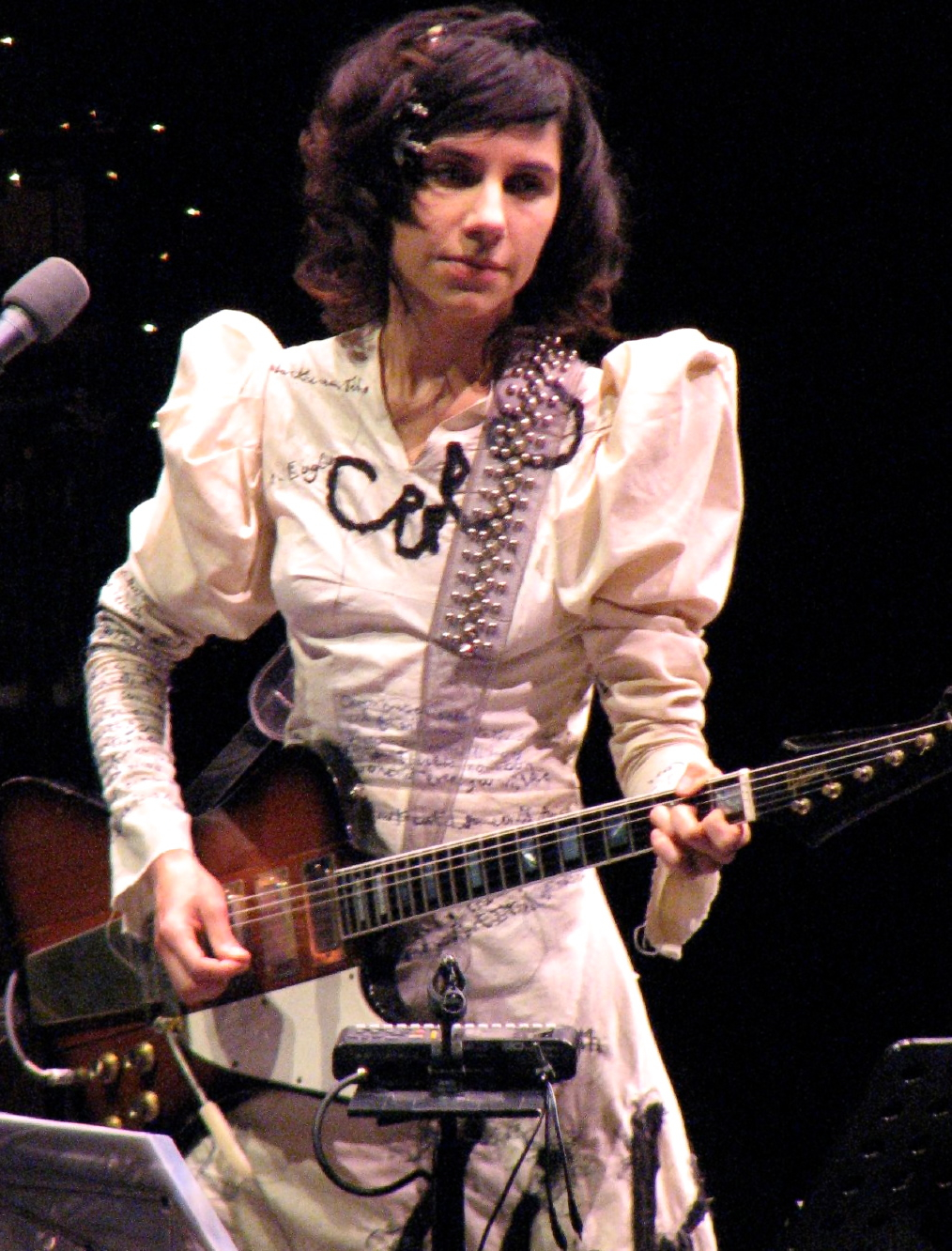
PJ Harvey heavily inspired how Erez took on political issues when writing the lyrics.

Described by Erez as being "all over the place because it is so influenced by everything that's happening," Off The Radar deals with world issues such as surveillance, media manipulation, sexual assault, and social media drama. Erez states the album is about the fact “that you can’t really trust the people who are responsible for running your life – your financial life, your security, everything." The title track deals with many people's desires for recognition and how companies use social media to control people's identities. "Pity", a song about how females are "used" in the real world, was inspired by a gang rape that took place at a nightclub in Tel Aviv in 2015. People filmed the crime via smartphones instead of helping the rape victim, which Erez was disgusted by. "Toy" is a song about a corrupt society told from the views of two people: the person who was recently dethroned from his position as a leader and the new head of the society. The record also occasionally deals with the feelings of having white privilege. In particular, "Dance While You Shoot," a critique on a "more extreme, more religious, more nationalistic" government in Erez's words, is about enjoying life "when you know that the very existence of your life is something that harms others."

Despite these themes, Erez wrote the lyrics based on rhythm rather than grammar, which, as Huchinson claimed, made them "playful yet often oblique." Erez's take on political problems was influenced by PJ Harvey, her reasoning being that Harvey approached controversial subjects in an "effective way and she still manages to keep it very personal." While numerous critics have described the album as a protest record, Erez did not agree with this categorization, as the LP "is more of an emotional documentation of events and influences in our lives...how we experience the world." She wanted the lyrics to relate to her listeners on a "global" level, reasoning that "we all have this primal need to be noticed." As Erez explained, "You can hear one of my songs and say ‘hey, that song is about America’ or ‘that one is about Trump.’ The only message I truly stand behind is the need to wake up because crazy things are happening everywhere today."

== Singles and music videos ==
After being signed to City Slang, Erez emailed "maybe 15 or 20" demos to the label. However, it wasn't until Erez sent "Dance While You Shoot", a song she wrote in October 2016, that the label was ecstatic, and thus it was chosen as her first single for the imprint, released on 2 November 2016. The video for "Dance While You Shoot" was released the same day as its single and was directed by Zhang + Knight. Influenced by the infrared works of Richard Mosse, the video shifts randomly between concrete-filled imagery and quick burst of fuchsia colors, which serves as a symbol of "violence, corruption and desperation." There are also shots of Erez dancing and standing still in the video. The music video was originally planned to be filmed in the Ukrainian town of Pripyat due to its deserted atmosphere. However, the producers ended up filming the video in the capital city of Ukraine, Kyiv. Erez described Kyiv as an "interesting place," having "a very dark side to it."

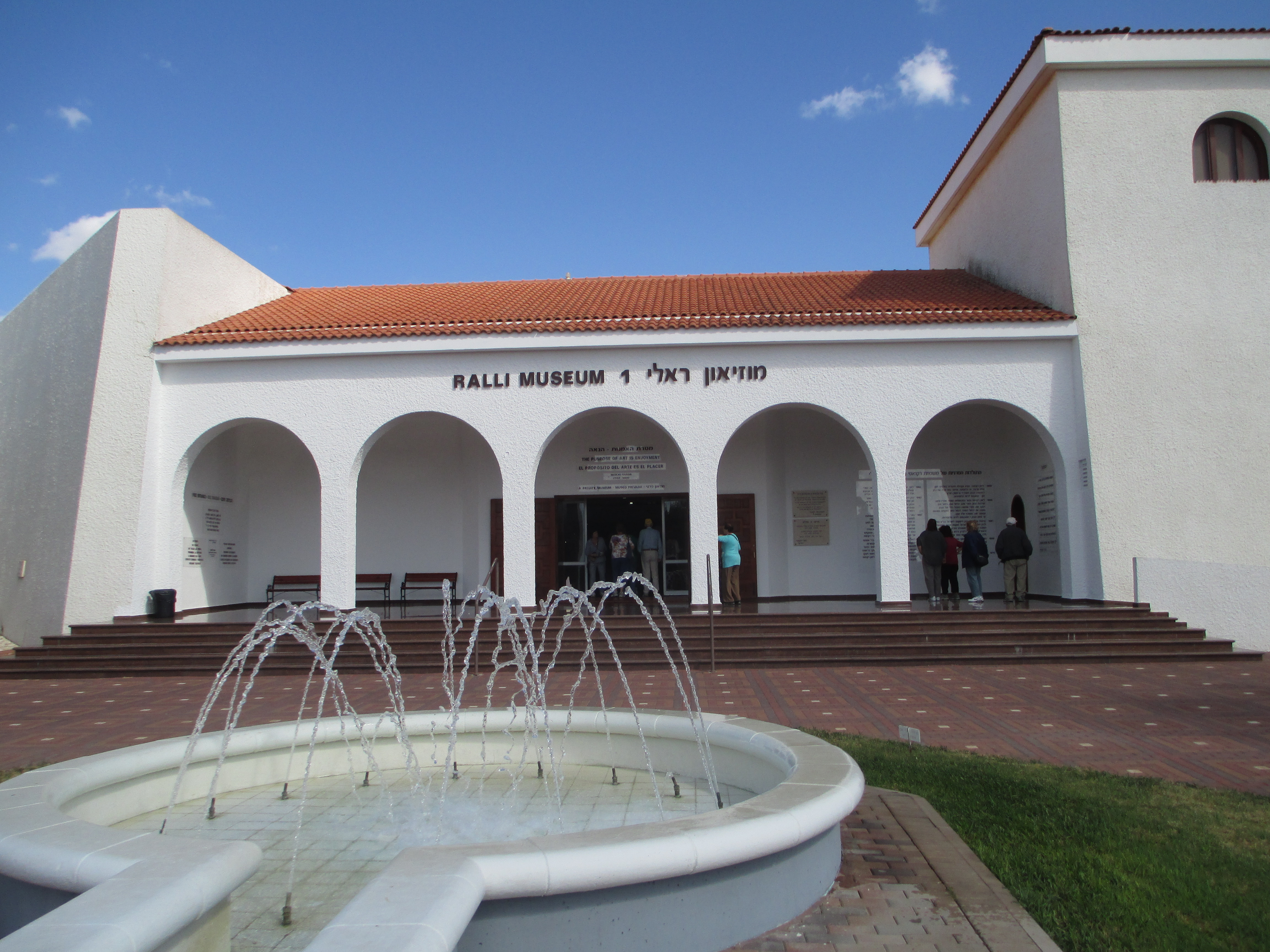
The music video for "Noisy" was filmed at Ralli Museum located in Erez's hometown of Caesarea.

"Pity" was Off The Radar's second single, issued on 1 February 2017, and also received a music video directed by Zhang + Knight and issued the same day. Filmed in London, it depicts Erez standing around old televisions with screens displaying her from different angles, which serves as a symbol for "how quickly and easily video documentation becomes shared, publicised and distorted" according to her. "Toy" was released on 28 February 2017 as the album's third single, and Stereogum premiered the track's music video on 8 March 2017. The Hen Makhluf-directed video depicts Erez and a set of dancers on the rooftop of a building located in a city mostly consisting of "human-monster hybrids." Makhluf also directed the video for "Noisy", which was filmed at Ralli Museum located in Erez's hometown of Caesarea and released on 29 June 2017. As Erez summarized, the video is "the story of a group of girls who can create havoc even in the most peaceful and civilized places. The group of girls represent the noise that exists in our minds, the voices that are always there and prevent clear and rational thought."

Noisey premiered the title track of Off The Radar on 4 April 2017, and its music video was released on 15 May 2017. Directed by Eden Kalif and Daniella Meroz, it depicts several "weird and eccentric creatures" playing in a sports competition with "faceless" judges and "no real ending or winner." As the directors explained, the video is about "being judged, and the perceived necessity of having to meet the expectations of others." Erez stated the creatures are "trapped in a loop of trying to prove themselves", and since the judges don't have any facial expressions, they only have their hands as indications for their verdicts, meaning "you can't really tell whether they like or dislike the performances." Erez, alongside Rousso and Omri Ben Shalom, directed a music video for "Balkada", which was released on 17 October 2017. It involves Erez walking around Tel Aviv as various characters in different costumes. She described Tel Aviv as "a non-religious city, sometimes looked at as a ‘sin city’ in the middle of a country dominated by religion," and wanted "to search for ‘holiness’ and moments of ‘pureness’ in the filth and ugliness that is the ‘sin city’." This represents the theme of the song, which, according to Erez, is how "idolization and worship in their obsessive and blind form led us to the commonly used comparison between art and religion - between creativity and creation, and how the two can easily look the same and cross over."

== Critical reception ==
Professional ratings
Aggregate scores
Source	Rating
AnyDecentMusic?	7.9/10
Review scores
Source	Rating
The 405	8/10
Gigsoup	89%
Loud and Quiet	8/10
The Music	4/5 stars
Paste	8.6/10
The Skinny	4/5 stars

Paste magazine's Kayleigh Hughes stated, "In its cohesion and crispness, its innovative approach, and perhaps most significantly the astuteness and clarity with which it engages in the frantic, threatening, vibrant world that surrounds Erez, Off the Radar is galvanizing." Sumsion wrote that the album established Erez as a "rarity in glitchy, ethereal r’n’b and strobe-lit alt-pop, an auteur who bolsters her moody production chops with lyrical content of striking depth and acuity." As he concluded in his reviews for Gigsoup, "Dripping with imagination and vibrancy, ‘Off The Radar’ is an audacious, cohesive and enchanting sensorama from a fearless, original artist forging her own path, an eminently-replayable provocation for both head and heart that dives deep into new, curious directions and breathes fresh life into warped pop."

Some reviewers praised Off The Radar for Erez's fearlessness in discussing controversial problems, some honored its ability to combine together both fun musical elements and harsh political subject matter, while others praised its unique and experiminetal sound design and production, which Hughes described as a set of "clean, adventurous sound mixing decisions that could easily have gotten murky and chaotic if not for the exacting precision of their implementation." Rob Hakiman complemented the record's "playful confidence," its huge and "crisp" production, and Erez's "powerful" and "derisve" vocal performance.

== In other media ==
"Dance While You Shoot" was featured in a 2017 Apple Music advertisement.

== Track listing ==
Derived from the official Off The Radar Bandcamp page.

No.	Title	Length
1.	"Balkada"	3:02
2.	"Dance While You Shoot"	3:27
3.	"Toy"	2:57
4.	"Instruction"	0:20
5.	"Pity"	3:22
6.	"Quiet One"	0:52
7.	"Worth None"	4:05
8.	"Global Fear"	3:46
9.	"Hit U"	1:37
10.	"Off The Radar"	2:55
11.	"Side Effect"	0:29
12.	"Muezzin"	2:56
13.	"Noisy"	3:56
14.	"a hit is A Hit"	1:32
15.	"Junior"	4:07
Total length:		39:23

== Personnel ==
Derived from the liner notes of Off The Radar and the official Vlado Meller Mastering official website.

- Written, produced, and performed by Noga Erez and Ori Rousso
- Additional production on "Balkada" by Eitan Reiter
- Additional writing on "Noisy" by Matan Spenser
- Additional drums on "Toy" by Ran Jacobovitz
- Cymbal on "Worth None" by Yuval Kaufmann
- Backing vocals on "Off The Radar" by Ayelet Rousso
- Bass clarinet on "Off The Radar" by Shaul Barkan
- Recorded and mixed at Dorit Studios in Tel Aviv and Avner Studios in Even Yehuda
- Mastered by Vlado Meller at Vlado Meller Mastering in Charleston, South Carolina with assistance from Jeremy Lubsey
- Cover artwork by Studio ETC
- Cover photography by Ofer Dabush
- Physical release layout by Doreen Becker and Marco Rapisarda

== Release history ==
Region	Date	Format(s)	Label
Worldwide	2 June 2017	CD; digital download; Vinyl	City Slang
