= Noga Erez =

Israeli singer, songwriter and producer

Noga Erez נגה ארז
- Noga Erez at the 2026 Montreux Jazz Festival

Background information
- Born: 26 December 1989 (age 36)
- Origin: Tel Aviv, Israel
- Genres: Electropop, EDM, alternative pop
- Occupations: Singer-songwriter, producer
- Instrument: Vocals
- Years active: 2011–present
- Labels: Neon Gold Records/Atlantic Records (2022–present), City Slang
- Website: nogaerez.com

Noga Erez (Hebrew: נגה ארז; born 26 December 1989) is an Israeli singer, songwriter and producer known for a mix of electronic pop, hip-hop and alternative music. She released her debut album Off the Radar in 2017. Her third album,The Vandalist, was released on Neon Gold Records/Atlantic Records in 2024. She has collaborated and performed with artists including Missy Elliott, Robbie Williams, Armani White, and Florence + the Machine, and appeared at major festivals including Coachella, Lollapalooza, Austin City Limits, and Primavera Sound.

== Early life ==
Noga Erez was born on 26 December 1989, in Atzmon, Israel, and grew up in the coastal town of Caesarea from the age of six.

Erez began studying music as a child, learning piano and guitar, and later pursued composition studies at the Jerusalem Academy of Music and Dance. She was drafted to the Israel Defense Forces as a musician and served in a military band.

== Career ==
=== 2011–2016: Career beginnings ===
Early in her career, she was in an indie-folk band, the Secret Sea, before she gravitated towards jazz. In 2011 Erez worked on a jazz album, which she almost finished and decided to scrap and move to writing and producing electronic music.

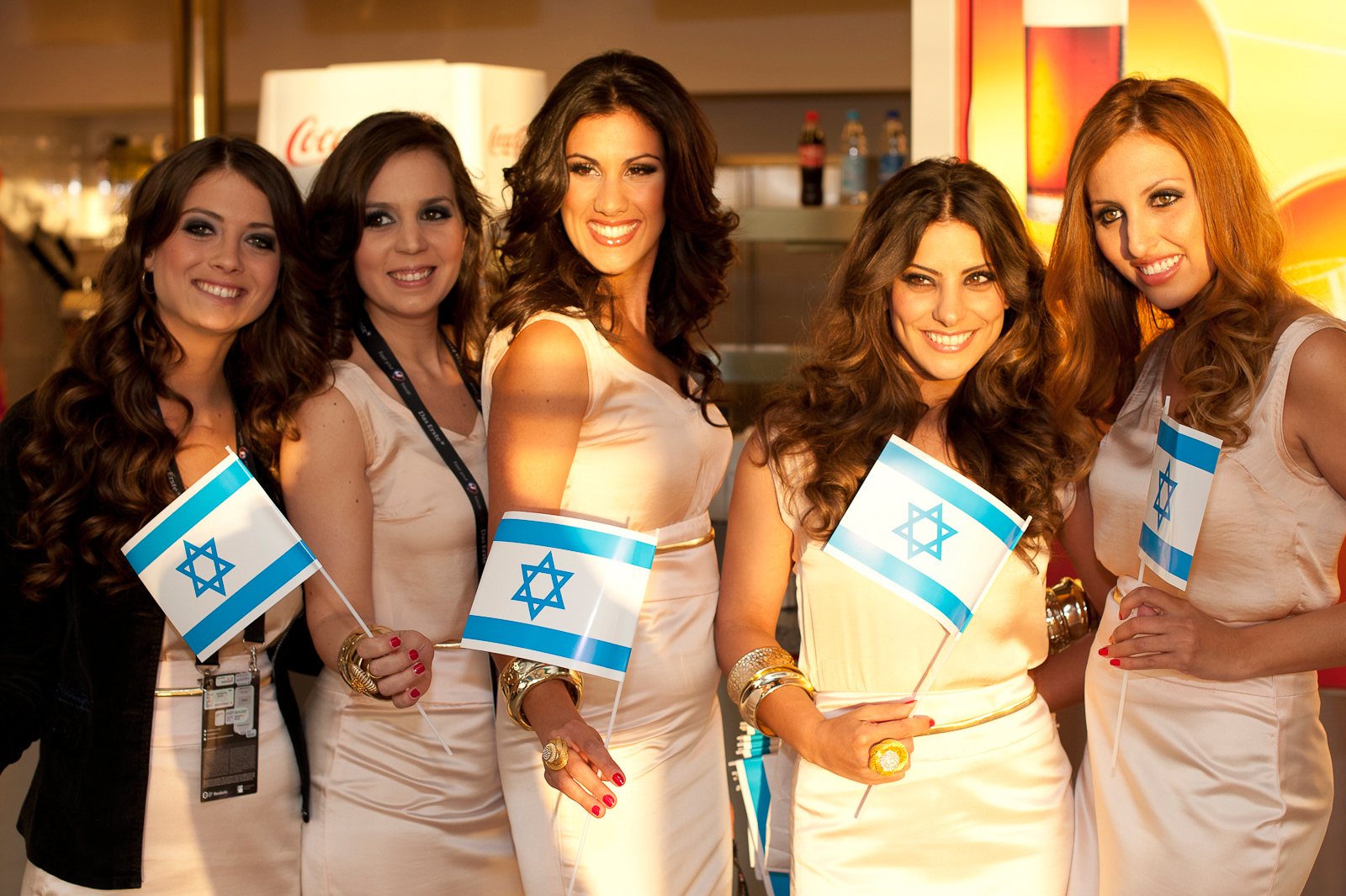
Erez (left) with Dana International's other backup singers, attending a contest-related event in Düsseldorf

After completing her military service in 2011, where she served as a military musician, she performed as one of the backing vocalists for Dana International in that year's Eurovision Song Contest, performing the song "Ding Dong".

On stage, Erez performs as a three-piece-band with herself on vocals, Ori Rousso (sampler, synthesizer, guitar), and Ran Jacobovitz (electronic drums, percussion).

=== 2017–2020: Off the Radar ===
Her debut album, Off the Radar, was released in 2017.

Erez's first single, "Toy", received a rave review from The New York Times: "The Israeli singer and electronic-music producer Noga Erez gives ‘Toy’ a beat that jitters and heaves, ratchets across the stereo field, speeds up fitfully and stops for a moment of dead silence halfway through the song; the melodies are brief modal phrases hinting at Middle Eastern origins... It's a sparse, thorny, unstable track — and haunting, too".

Erez produced her first record Off the Radar, which was released 2 June 2017 via City Slang, with her partner Ori Rousso. This release was followed by festival shows at Primavera, SXSW, Pitchfork Paris, Roskilde, MELT! Visions Festival, Convergence and Great Escape in 2017. She also toured the UK and Europe in 2017.

In 2019, Erez released the single "Chin Chin" in collaboration with rapper Echo. The song was featured on me & dad radio, Billie Eilish's podcast with her father, where she praised the song.

=== 2021–present: Kids and The Vandalist ===
On 13 January 2021, Erez announced her second studio album, Kids. It was released on 26 March 2021. On 12 April 2021, she appeared on Jimmy Kimmel Live, performing the album's first single, "Views".

In June 2022 it was reported that Erez had signed a new record deal with Neon Gold Records/Atlantic Records. On 31 August 2022, Erez collaborated with the rock band Weezer on a remix of the band's song "Records". On 16 September 2022, Erez collaborated with the American rapper Missy Elliott on a remix of Erez's song "Nails". On 16 and 17 September 2022, Erez was the opening act for the British band Florence and the Machine at Madison Square Garden. In June 2023, she performed with British artist, Robbie Williams at his Tel Aviv concert. They performed his 2000 song, "Kids", which he previously recorded with Kylie Minogue.

In September 2024, she released her third studio album, The Vandalist. The album features collaborations with Robbie Williams, Eden Ben Zaken, Dillom and Flyana Boss. The Robbie Williams collaboration, "Danny", was released as a single on 18 September 2024. It was her first album release with Neon Gold Records/Atlantic Records. The making of the album was documented in Noga, a film directed by Benji and Jono Bergmann. The documentary was released in 2026 and delves into producing an album amid personal and geopolitical challenges.

In November 2024, Erez joined the Summer Carnival tour of Pink for two concerts in Tulsa and Arlington in the United States.

In April 2026, Erez became the first Israeli singer to perform at the Coachella festival. Her other bookings for 2026 include the Austin City Limits Music Festival in October.

In May 2026 she released the single "I Love You", a collaboration with Armani White.

== Influences ==
Erez's musical style draws influences from alternative, electronic music, and sample-based hip-hop, but is also strongly influenced by political circumstances both in her country and globally, though she has been reticent to describe her work as political. In an interview with The Guardian, Erez describes her songs as her way to "process the issues that bother me about the world". Her music also references her musical influences such as Flying Lotus, Björk, Frank Ocean or Kendrick Lamar.

== Personal life ==
Ori Rousso is both her partner and musical collaborator. Their first child was born in January 2025.

=== Politics ===
In a May 2018 interview with Germany's DW-TV, she expressed support for a two-state solution.

In July 2021, comments she made about the Boycott, Divestment and Sanctions movement to Huck magazine in London provoked controversy in Israel. In the same month, she distanced herself from the comments: "I do not support the BDS movement and never did...I love Israel and do not support any kind of boycott of the country, my people, and any expression of hatred", she wrote. "In my innocence, I did not understand how important the choice of words is and how deceptive the written word can be. I thought the answer I gave would be quoted verbatim, without them cherry-picking certain parts to make the headline sexier. I was wrong". In a separate 2018 interview, Erez said that the movement's methods do not serve peace in the region and unfairly target musicians: "I’m hoping people read the message behind an Israeli musician".

In February 2023, she protested online about the 2023 Israeli judicial reform proposals.

In May 2024, she performed in a Tel Aviv rally demanding the release of hostages amid the Gaza war hostage crisis. Eden Golan, Netta Barzilai and Lola Marsh also performed. Family members of hostages also spoke, including Rachel Goldberg-Polin, mother of American-Israeli Hersh Goldberg-Polin. Ambassadors from the United States, United Kingdom, Germany and Austria also addressed the crowds. Former Secretary of State Hillary Clinton also appeared in a video message.

In her 2024 single, "PC People" she takes on the extremes of woke and cancel culture in a tongue-in-cheek way. Erez urges fellow liberals of the need for an "an authentic exchange of ideas and dialogue".

In December 2024, she revealed that she is facing an international boycott due to her Israeli nationality: "I really wish it was just one case, but the list kind of keeps growing. It’s not for anything that I said, it’s simply because I was born where I was born. I believe that boycotting artists will not bring a solution. I believe that banning songs, movies, plays, books, etc., is not going to fix the world’s problems".

== Discography ==
=== Studio albums ===
- Off the Radar (2017)
- Kids (2021)
- The Vandalist (2024)

=== Singles ===
- "Toy" (2017)
- "Sunshine" (2018)
- "Bad Habits" (2018)
- "Cash Out" (2018)
- "Chin Chin" with Echo (2019)
- "Views" featuring Reo Cragun & Rousso (2020)
- "No News on TV" (2020)
- "You So Done" (2020)
- "End of the Road" (2021)
- "Story" (2021)
- "Knockout (Against the Machine)" (2021)
- "The "A" in Amazing" (2021)
- "Industry Baby" (2022) (Cover of the Lil Nas X song of the same name)
- "Nails" (2022)
- "Nails (feat. Missy Elliott)" (2022)
- "Quiet" ( written as a theme song for the Netflix movie Heart of Stone)
- "Come back home" (2024)
- "Vandalist" (2024)
- "PC People" (feat. Rousso) (2024)
- "Godmother" (feat. Eden Ben Zaken) (2024)
- "Danny" (feat. Robbie Williams) (2024)
- "Dumb" (2024)
- "Not My Problem" (2025)
- "Bubbling" (2025)

=== Appearances ===
- Weezer: "Records" remix (2002)

=== Music videos ===
Year	Title	Director(s)	Ref.
2016	"Dance While You Shoot"	Zhang + Knight	
2017	"Pity"	Zhang + Knight	
2017	"Toy"	Hen Makhluf	
2017	"Off the Radar"	Eden Kalif, Daniella Meroz	
2017	"Balkada"	Noga Erez, Ori Rousso, Omri Ben Shalom	
2018	"Bad Habits"	Shlomy Reuven, Morch Landsberg, Noga Erez, Ori Rousso	
2018	"Cash Out" featuring Sammus	Hen Makhluf	
2019	"Chin Chin" with Echo	Shlomy x Morchi	
2020	"Views" featuring Reo Cragun & Rousso	Indy Hait	
2020	"No News on TV" featuring Rousso	FISHnCHIPS	
2020	"You So Done"	Indy Hait	
2021	"End of the Road"	Indy Hait	
2021	"Story" featuring Rousso	Indy Hait	
2021	"The "A" in Amazing"	Roy Raz	
2024	"PC People" featuring Rousso	Indy Hait	
2024	"Ayayay" featuring Dillom	Ori Rousso & Noga Erez	
2024	"Godmother" featuring Eden Ben Zaken	Roei Morad	
2024	"Sad Generation, Happy Pictures" featuring Flyana Boss	Eran Horowitz	
2024	"Dumb"	Omri Rozi	
2024	"Watch the News"	Ori Rousso & Noga Erez	

== Awards and nominations ==
Year	Award	Artist/work	Category	Result	Ref.
2018	VIA Awards	Noga Erez	Best Newcomer	Won	
2021	Pop Awards	"Views"	Music Video of the Year	Nominated	
2023	Berlin Music Video Awards	Nails	Best Song	Nominated	
