= Flyana Boss =

American hip hop duo

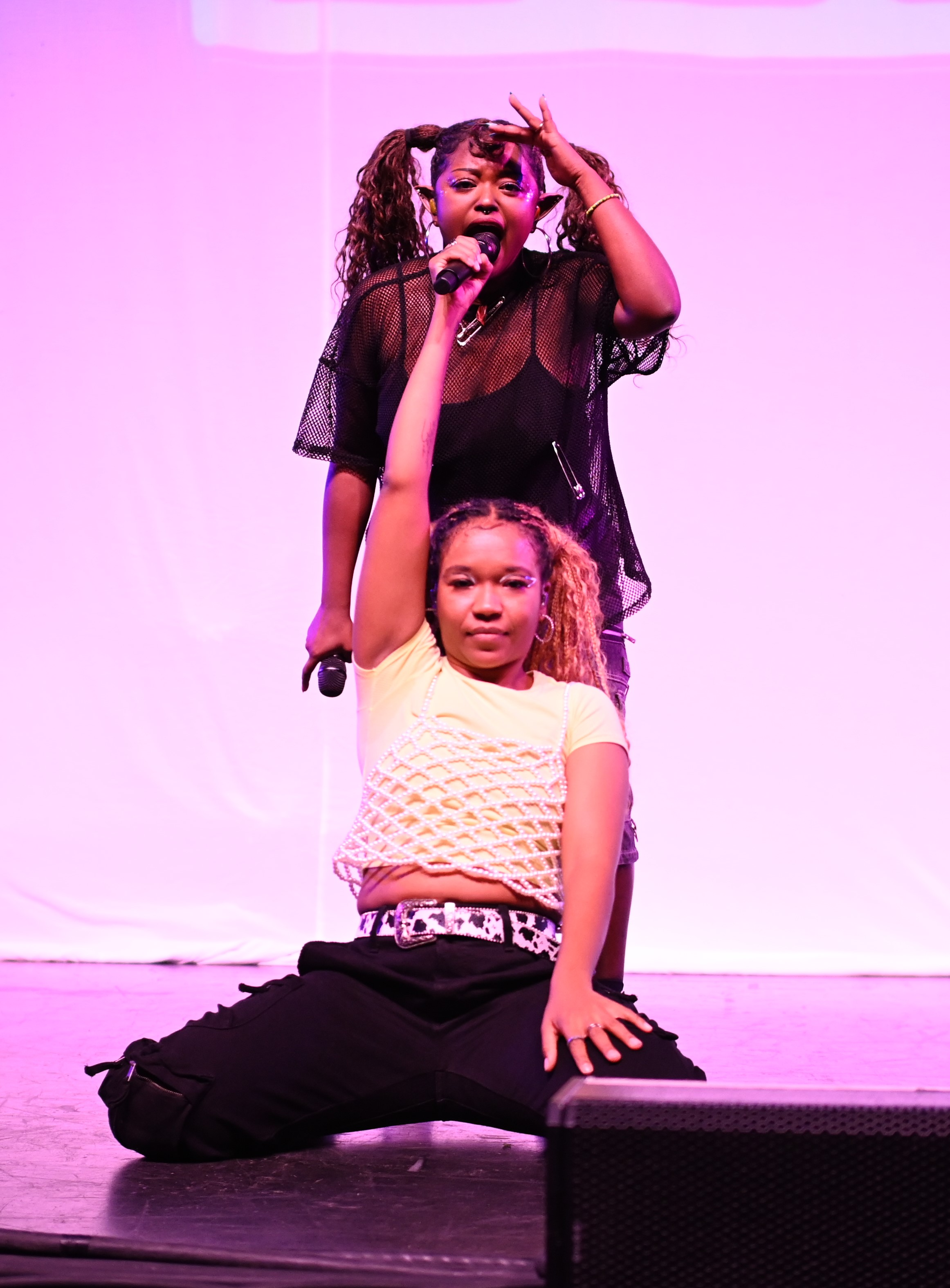
- Flyana Boss performing at The Met Philadelphia in 2023

Background information
- Origin: Los Angeles, California
- Genre: Hip hop
- Years active: 2019–present
- Labels: Atlantic; Vnclm_
- Members: Bobbi LaNea Tyler; Folayan Omi Kunerede
- Website: flyanaboss.com

TikTok information
- Page: FLYANABOSS
- Years active: 2019–present
- Genre: Music
- Followers: 1.3 million
- Last updated: August 8, 2026

Flyana Boss is an American hip hop duo from Los Angeles, California consisting of rappers Bobbi LaNea Tyler and Folayan Omi Kunerede. They signed to Atlantic Records in 2021, and their song "You Wish" gained popularity online in 2023.

== Career ==
=== Early years and formation ===
Bobbi LaNea Tyler and Folayan Kunerede met while attending the Musicians Institute on Hollywood Boulevard in California, where they formed Flyana Boss. Bobbi LaNea is from Detroit, MI. Folayan is from Dallas and is the daughter of natural hair educator Isis Brantley. The group name is a play on the name of singer and actress Diana Ross. They were signed to Atlantic Records in July 2021 after their record label, Vnclm_, made a joint venture with Atlantic.

=== Boffum EP and TikTok success (2023-present) ===
Their extended play, Boffum, featuring the songs "Nu Nu" and "Really Really", was released in February 2023. They released their extended play Make It A Double, which consisted of the songs "You Wish" and "Trashboi", in June 2023. "You Wish" went viral after soundtracking a series of videos recorded by Flyana Boss' videographer, Evan Blum, of the duo running through various locations—including Walt Disney World, the Santa Monica Pier, and the Hollywood Walk of Fame—which the duo began posting on their TikTok account in June 2023. When the repetitive nature of their TikTok content for “You Wish” came under criticism by fans in early July 2023, Missy Elliott came to their defense, stating that it was an "old school tactic" and changing things up often "confuses" people. The duo opened for Janelle Monáe's "The Age of Pleasure Tour".

== Discography ==
=== Extended plays ===
Title	Details
Boffum	Released: February 24, 2023; Label: Vnclm_, Atlantic; Format: Streaming, digital download
Vitamin FB	Released: April 28, 2023; Label: Vnclm_, Atlantic; Format: Streaming, digital download
Make It A Double	Released: June 16, 2023; Label: Vnclm_, Atlantic; Format: Streaming, digital download
This Ain't the Album	Released: March 29, 2024; Label: Vnclm_, Atlantic; Format: Streaming, digital download
Under the Influence	Released: June 19, 2026; Label: broke; Format: Streaming, digital download

=== Singles ===
==== As lead artist ====
List of singles, showing year released and album
Title	Year	Album
"Bossi"	2019	Non-album singles
"Ring Around"	2020	Non-album singles
"Move Back!"	2020	Non-album singles
"Jenny"	2020	Non-album singles
"Jingle Dem Bells"	2020	Non-album singles
"Daddy?"	2021	Non-album singles
"Olé"	2021	Non-album singles
"Bounce It"	2021	Non-album singles
"Miss Me"	2022	Non-album singles
"All Eyes on Me" (with Marky Style)	2022	Non-album singles
"Mango Bananas"	2022	Non-album singles
"Buddha"	2022	Non-album singles
"Really Really"	2023	Non-album singles
"Nu Nu"	2023	Non-album singles
"Hot Tea"	2023	Non-album singles
"Fondue"	2023	Non-album singles
"You Wish" (solo or remix with Missy Elliott and Kaliii)	2023	Non-album singles
"Trashboi"	2023	Non-album singles
"Bitch Imma Star"	2023	Non-album singles
"Big One"	2023	Non-album singles
"UFHO"	2023	Non-album singles
"Candyman"	2024	Non-album singles
"Yeaaa"	2024	Non-album singles
"Money At"	2024	Non-album singles
"Skateboard"	2024	Non-album singles
"Stupendous"	2024	Non-album singles
"Spend It"	2024	Non-album singles
"Judy"	2024	Non-album singles
"Hot Butter Summertime"	2024	Non-album singles
"Nepo Baby"	2024	Non-album singles
"Baddie Bakery (with Malibu Babie)"	2024	Non-album singles
"See Sumn"	2024	Non-album singles
"Airplane Mode"	2025	Non-album singles
"C*nt"	2025	Non-album singles
"Try Me"	2025	Non-album singles
"Icicle"	2025	Non-album singles
"Jungle"	2026	Under the Influence
"Feelin It"	2026	Under the Influence

==== As featured artist ====
List of singles, showing year released and album
Title	Year	Album
"Boomerang" (Nikitaa featuring Flyana Boss)	2021	High Priestess
"Nice To Meet Ya" (INJI featuring Flyana Boss)	2024	We Good
"Sad Generation, Happy Pictures" (Noga Erez featuring Flyana Boss)	2024	The Vandalist
"Let Ya" (Autumn Paige featuring Flyana Boss)	2025	Non-album single
"Introvert" (Ramaj Eroc featuring Flyana Boss)	2026	Darrell v1
"olympia" (Mericia featuring Flyana Boss)	2026	Non-album single

==== Folayan, as solo featured artist ====
List of singles, showing year released and album
Title	Year	Album
"All She Want" (Ramaj Eroc featuring Folayan & Lyrik Luciano)	2018	Non-album single

== Tours ==
=== Headlining ===
- The Bosstanical Garden Tour (2024)

=== Supporting ===
- Janelle Monáe – Age of Pleasure Tour (2023)
- Kesha – Only Love Tour (2023)

== Awards and nominations ==
=== Berlin Music Video Awards ===
The Berlin Music Video Awards is an international festival that promotes the art of music videos.

Year	Nominated work	Award	Result	Ref.
2025	"Money At - JD Sports x Nike"	Best Animation	Nominated	
