= Isis Brantley =

American natural hair stylist, educator, and activist

Isis S. Brantley
- Born: 1958 October 07, 67; Dallas, Texas, U.S.
- Occupations: Natural hair stylist, entrepreneur, educator, activist
- Years active: 1970s–present
- Organization: Institute of Ancestral Braiding
- Known for: Legal and political advocacy for natural hair braiders in Texas
- Website: www.naturallyisis.com

Isis S. Brantley (born 1958) is an American natural-hair stylist, entrepreneur, educator, and activist based in Dallas, Texas. She is best known for leading a decades-long campaign that resulted in the deregulation of natural hair-braiding in Texas in 2015.

== Early life and education ==
Brantley was raised in the Bonton neighborhood of South Dallas, where she began braiding hair at about age nine. She traces her ancestry to Mali in West Africa and views hair-braiding as part of a spiritual and cultural lineage.

In the late 1970s she studied theater at what is now the University of North Texas before pursuing a full-time career in natural hair care.

== Career ==
=== African Braiding Studio and early work ===
In 1981, Brantley opened the African Braiding Studio in Dallas. Her clients included local artists and musicians, among them singer Erykah Badu. She emphasized natural and protective styles suited to textured hair, rejecting chemical straightening and focusing on scalp health and holistic wellness.

=== Institute of Ancestral Braiding ===
Brantley later founded the Institute of Ancestral Braiding in Dallas's Oak Cliff district. The school teaches traditional African braiding, textured-hair care, scalp health, and entrepreneurship. It became the center of a legal case after Texas required braiding schools to meet barber-college standards.

=== NaturallyIsis and product lines ===
Operating under the NaturallyIsis brand, Brantley combines a salon, educational workshops, and a product line for natural hair care. In 1998 she introduced the Sisters of Isis range of shampoos and conditioners formulated for textured hair.

== Legal advocacy ==
=== 1997 arrest ===
In 1997 Brantley was arrested for braiding hair without a cosmetology license after undercover officers entered her salon. At that time, Texas law required 1,500 hours of cosmetology training—none of which covered natural braiding.

=== Brantley v. Kuntz and reform ===
Represented by the Institute for Justice, Brantley filed a federal lawsuit, Brantley v. Kuntz, in 2013 challenging regulations that forced braiding schools to meet full barber-college standards. In January 2015, a federal court ruled the regulations unconstitutional, and later that year the Texas Legislature passed House Bill 2717, removing braiding from state cosmetology laws. The decision became a model for similar occupational licensing reforms across the United States.

== Philosophy ==
Brantley promotes hair as both ancestral and spiritual, describing it as "the highest point on the body that connects to the heavens." Her philosophy links hair care with nutrition and holistic wellness, encouraging clients to "heal through the hair." She teaches African history and the politics of Black hair alongside technical braiding skills.

== Recognition and influence ==
Brantley has been featured in D Magazine, The Dallas Morning News, and KERA News for her role in shaping the natural hair movement. Her activism is credited with helping thousands of Texans, primarily women of color, pursue braiding as a legitimate business without restrictive licensing.

== Personal life ==
Brantley is the mother of five children and has described herself as "YeYe," a Yoruba term of respect, to her grandchildren. She continues to live and work in Dallas, Texas.

== See also ==
- Natural hair movement
- CROWN Act
