= Lauren Woods =

American artist

- Born: 1979 (age 45–46); Kansas City, Missouri, United States
- Education: University of North Texas, San Francisco Art Institute (MFA)
- Notable work: Dallas Drinking Fountain Project (DIS)FIGURATIONS (S)Port of San Francisco Looking Down On My Soul

lauren woods is an American artist who works with film, video, performance, and installation art that challenges the systems of oppression and power as they relate to race. She was raised in Dallas, Texas. She is a visiting lecturer at Southern Methodist University.

Woods holds undergraduate degrees from the University of North Texas, and a 2006 Master of Fine Arts from the San Francisco Art Institute. Her site-specific installation A Dallas Drinking Fountain Project gained national attention. Her artwork has been exhibited both across the United States and internationally, including Washington D.C., San Francisco, Los Angeles, New York, Dallas, and Miami, as well as Puerto Rico, Taiwan, South Korea, Japan, Mali, and France.

== A Dallas Drinking Fountain Project ==
Woods launched A Dallas Drinking Fountain Project in 2013. The work is installed in a drinking fountain in the Dallas County Records Building. When the button to activate the water fountain is pressed, a clip of Civil Rights era protests is projected onto the fountain. The user is then made aware of the faded remains of the Jim Crow-era sign reading "Whites Only" that was discovered above the fountain in 2003. Woods was visiting Dallas at the time this discovery was made, and began formulating ideas for an installation centering around the fountain soon after. She first proposed the idea in 2005, envisioning an installation consisting of a functioning water fountain that would play a 45-second long clip of scenes from the struggle for civil rights. Originally, Woods envisioned that the water would not start dispensing until the sequence of scenes concluded, but this idea was nixed by commissioners. In 2009, Woods moved back to Dallas from San Francisco, her home of ten years, to complete work on A Dallas Drinking Fountain Project. She was seven months pregnant at the time.

The work drew attention to the history of segregation through intervention in a common space, something not possible off-site or in a museum. The work was both celebrated for initiating discussion and critiqued for Woods' choice of historical clips.

The project has fueled perspectives on the debate on Confederate statues, suggesting the sites be made into collaborative art-making spaces so as to better confront and address the United States' history of segregation.

== Looking Down On My Soul ==
This piece, created by Woods in 2015, is a silent single-channel video sculpture. It depicts a man dancing on loop juxtaposed against the backdrop of the 1963 Birmingham riots. The two foot tall video shows police officers spraying fire hoses in the background. This piece was acquired by the Nasher Sculpture Center in Dallas, Texas. The title of Woods' piece comes from a song by Flying Lotus featuring rapper Kendrick Lamar.

== American Monument ==
American Monument is an artwork that examines cultural conditions under which African Americans have lost their lives to police violence. American Monument, Archive I, is an interactive sound sculpture that allows visitors to play audio material of police brutality against African Americans. This audio material was gathered in 2018 when American Monument initiated an extensive Freedom of Information Act request process. The material gathered from that request include close readings of use-of-force reports, prosecutor reports, witness testimonies, 911 calls, bystander and body/dash cam videos that show dominant white culture justifying fatal police violence. Archive I is placed in a grid of silently spinning black and white turntables on pedestals, each turntable representing one police murder. Supporting the main sculpture is Archive II which displays documents associated with each case of police murder.
