= Sanmar Denizcilik =

Shipyard and tugboat company

Sanmar Denizcilik is a Turkish firm that operates its own fleet of tugboats, and builds tugboats for its own fleet, and for other shipping firms. The firm was founded in 1976 by Orhan Gürün and Gökҫen Seven. It remains a privately held firm, with its board of directors chaired by Ali Gürün.

In July 2013, the firm constructed its 100th tugboat.

In November 2013, the firm delivered the world's first two tugboats powered by natural gas. Firms aiming to leave a smaller environmental footprint are converting their fleets to vessels powered by natural gas because they produce less pollutant byproducts. According to Seanews Turkey the vessels natural gas powered engines will emit:

- 92% reduced nitrous-oxide emission
- 17% reduced greenhouse gas emission
- 98-100% reduced sulphur-dioxide emission
- 98% reduced particulates

Many of the vessels the firm builds use azimuth thrusters for both propulsion and steering. Rolls-Royce has supplied over 150 azimuth thrusters to Sanmar. In 2014 Sanmar built its first tug propelled by Voith Schneider propulsion, another system where the propulsion system also provides steering. Voith Schneider propulsion uses vertical propellers which independently adjust their angle of attack as they rotate within a rotating disk—similar to the rotors of a helicopter. This makes them able to change the direction of their propulsion even more quickly than possible with an azimuth thruster.

On the 40th anniversary of its founding, in March 2016, the firm's own fleet numbered 23 vessels. The two shipyards where it constructs vessels are in Tuzla and Altinova.
