= Cosquín Rock =

Annual Argentine music festival

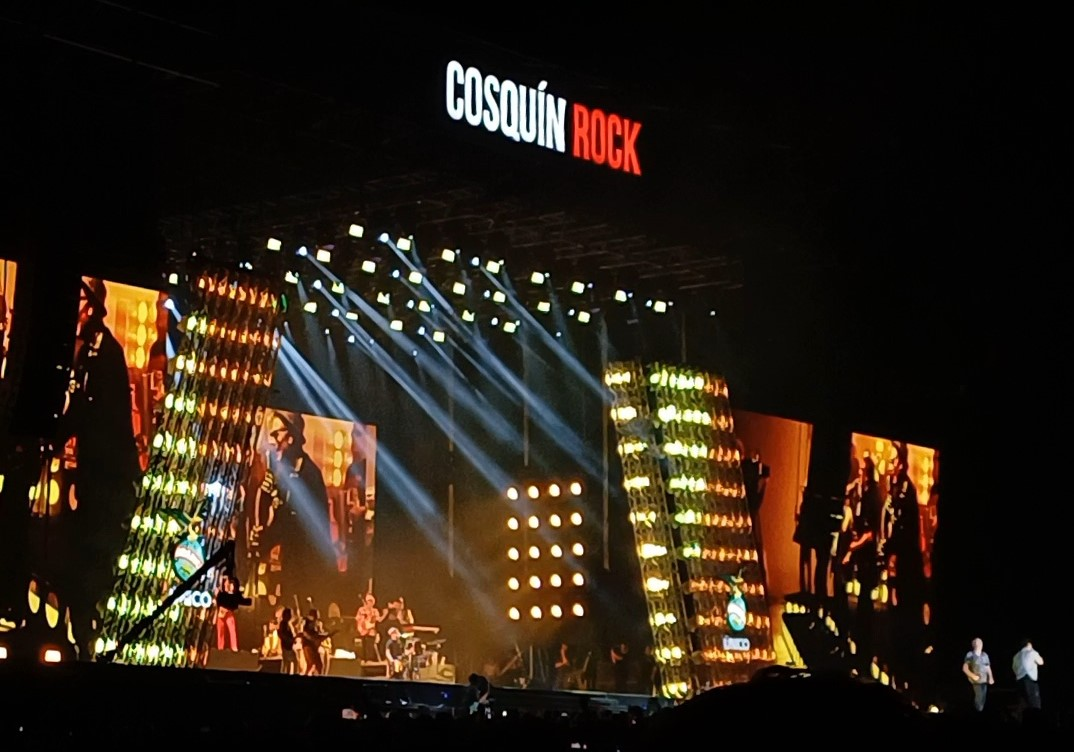
- A band performing at night on Cosquín Rock main stage.
- Genre: Rock, alternative rock, indie rock, Argentine rock
- Dates: 2-day weekend in February (currently)
- Locations: Plaza Próspero Molina, Argentina (2001–2004) Comuna San Roque, Argentina (2005–2010) Santa María de Punilla, Argentina (2011–present)
- Years active: 2001–present
- Attendance: 200,000
- Organiser: José Palazzo
- Website: http://cosquinrock.net/

Cosquín Rock is an Argentine music festival, held annually since 2001. It is currently held in Santa María de Punilla, Córdoba. In Argentina, it takes place in February during the summer, and it is one of the most popular music festivals in the country. Many important national rock singers and groups participate in the festival, along with some of the most important international rock bands, mostly from Spanish-speaking countries like Spain, Mexico, and Uruguay. In the beginning, it was focused only on national rock bands. However, throughout the years, the festival has also included bands from different places and of different genres, such as reggae, rap, cumbia, and cuarteto, among others.

== History ==
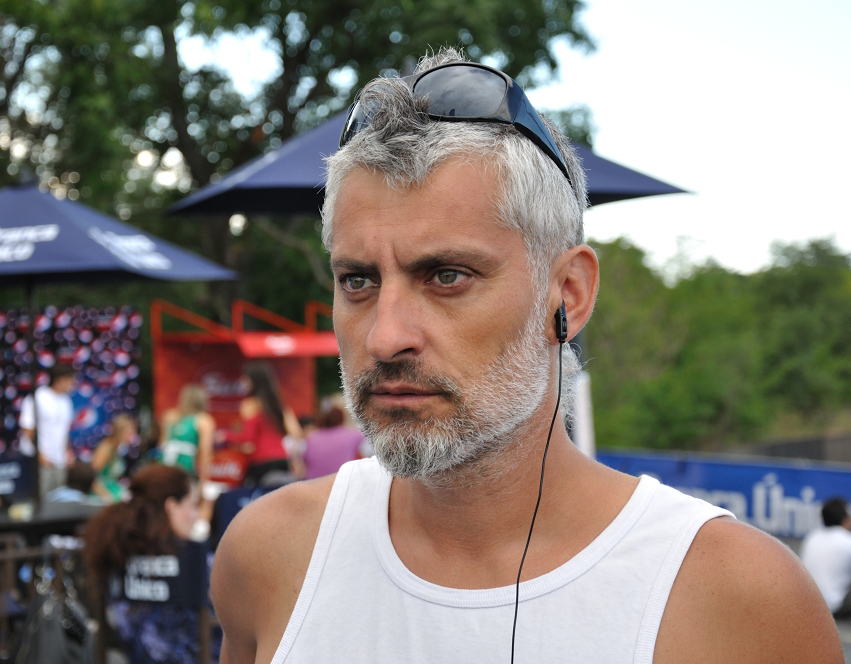
José Palazzo - Cosquín Rock 2011

The people behind the idea were José Palazzo, Constantino Carrara, and Héctor Emaides. Two local bands “Divididos” and “Los Piojos” contributed to consolidate the project. Finally, on Saturday 10th and Sunday 11th, February 2001 the first edition of the festival was held with the participation of more than 14 rock bands.

The duration of the festival has changed throughout the years since the first edition only lasted for two nights. It then became progressively longer, since the second edition lasted for three nights, and the third and fourth lasted for four nights. In the 5th and 6th editions, the festival lasted for five nights. Then, in 2007, it was shortened to three nights, and from 2018 onwards it was shortened again to two nights.

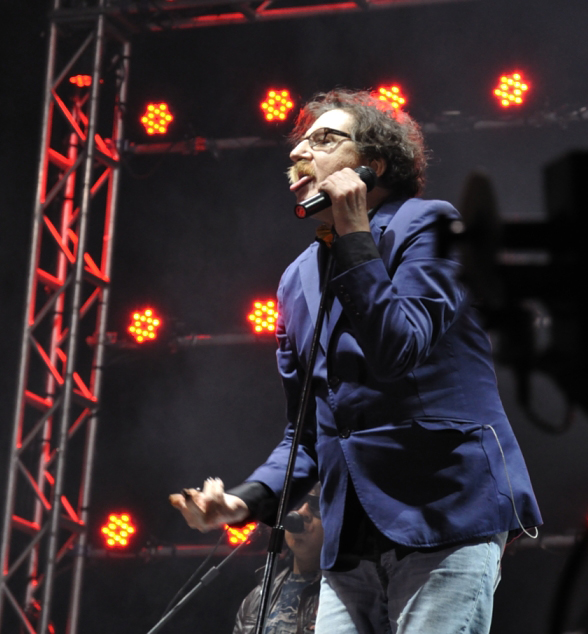
Charly García & the Prostitution at Cosquín Rock 12.02.2011

Initially, the festival was held in Plaza Próspero Molina in Cosquín, Córdoba until 2004. Later, due to economic reasons, and the abandonment of the project by Emaides, it was moved to Comuna San Roque, Córdoba in 2005. In 2011, due to the increased number of attendees, the festival was moved to Santa Maria de Punilla, which remains the current location.

It was during the 2004 edition that international bands were incorporated into the festival, with the Mexican band Molotov being the first one. In the next year's edition, two alternative stages were incorporated, which would start a tradition of having various stages in the festival. In this same edition, new genres were featured, such as reggae, heavy metal, blues, and punk. In 2020, the genres of pop, rap and trap were also added.

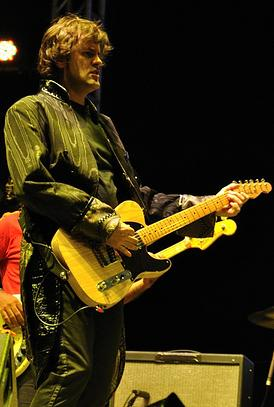
Ciro Martínez Dileo

In the 2012 edition, non-music-related activities started to be carried out in the festival. Some of these activities included movies, art exhibitions and gastronomic proposals, among others. In 2023, it had its attendance record, achieving 200,000 attendants between the two days.

Currently, the festival is expanding throughout different parts of the world, and in 2025 it will celebrate its 25th anniversary.

== Expansion ==
=== Editions in South America ===
In 2017, the first Cosquín Rock México was held in February. It included guest bands from Argentina and Mexico such as Caifanes, Café Tacvba and Panteón Rococó, among others.

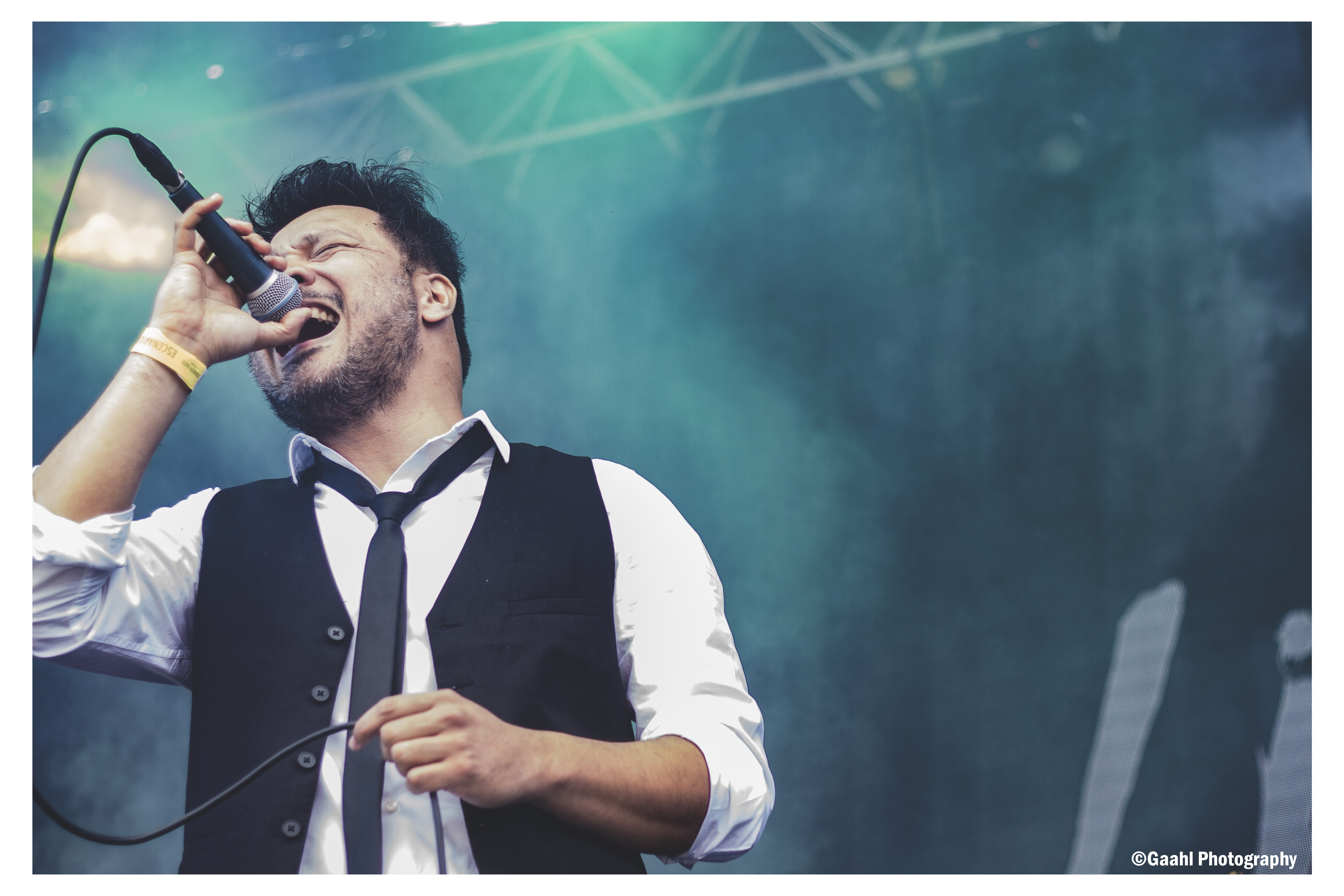
LIAM in Cosquín Rock Perú 2017

In October, Cosquín Rock Perú and Cosquín Rock Colombia took place in Lima and Bogotá, respectively. In November, the first Cosquín Rock Bolivia was celebrated in Santa Cruz de la Sierra.

In 2018, there was a second edition in México in July. In October, Cosquín Rock Chile took place in Santiago de Chile and Cosquín Rock Uruguay in the city of Canelones for the first time. In November, there was the first edition of Cosquín Rock Paraguay in Asunción, Paraná.

In 2024, the fourth edition of Cosquín Rock in Uruguay was held on April 20 and 21 in the Rural del Prado with a set of twin stages, “Antel” and a “Suzuki”. More than 64 local and international bands played, with La Mona Gimenez, an Argentinian singer of the popular genre cuarteto, being the big star of this edition.

=== International Editions ===
In 2019, the first edition of Cosquín Rock in Queens, New York was held, and soon after the pandemic in 2021 the second edition was held in Island Gardens, Miami, where more than 4000 people attended. The Puerto Rican band Cultura Profética, the Venezuelan group Los Amigos Invisibles, Louta, and the rock-pop band Literal were among the artists that performed in the Miami edition.

Even though there were some previous attempts to carry out the festival in Spain in 2019, the first successful edition of Cosquín Rock in Spain was in 2021 in Fuengirola, Spain. There was another on September 28, 2024 in Valladolid, Spain. Some of the invited artists for this 2024 edition were Steve Aoki, Arde Bogotá, Crystal Fighters, Hombres G, Gipsy Kings, Arizona Baby, and Ciro y los Persas, among others.

== Line up ==
Year	Place	Main invited artists
2001	Plaza Próspero Molina	Los Piojos, Divididos, Las Pelotas, Bersuit Vergarabat
2002	Plaza Próspero Molina	Los Piojos, Divididos, Charly García, Attaque 77, Catupecu Machu, Las Vacas Sagradas (Mendoza)
2003	Plaza Próspero Molina	Las Pelotas, Divididos, Attaque 77, Charly García, Los Piojos, Fito Páez, Las Vacas Sagradas (Mendoza)
2004	Plaza Próspero Molina	Bersuit Vergarabat, Callejeros, Las Pelotas, Charly García, Los Piojos, Árbol, Fito Páez, Pappo, Luis Alberto Spinetta, Catupecu Machu, Babasónicos
2005	Comuna San Roque	Charly García, Sepultura, Riff, León Gieco, Divididos, El Otro Yo, Carajo, Horcas, Babasónicos, Vicentico, Rata Blanca, Café Tacvba
2006	Comuna San Roque	Skay Beilinson, La 25, Kapanga, Babasónicos, Catupecu Machu, Attaque 77, Rata Blanca, Las Pelotas, Ratones Paranoicos, La Vela Puerca, Almafuerte, Brujería
2007	Comuna San Roque	Los Cafres, Las Pelotas, Babasónicos, Callejeros, Kapanga, Ratos de Porão, Almafuerte, Resistencia Suburbana, Los Gardelitos
2008	Comuna San Roque	Suicidal Tendencies, Intoxicados, Los Piojos, León Gieco, Pier, Dos Minutos, Almafuerte, Horcas, O'Connor, Guachupé, Tren Loco, Nonpalidece
2009	Comuna San Roque	Deep Purple, Intoxicados, Almafuerte, Los Piojos, Cielo Razzo, Misfits
2010	Comuna San Roque	Charly García, Die Toten Hosen, Emir Kusturica, Viejas Locas, El Cuarteto de Nos, Skay Bellison, Attaque 77, Massacre,
2011	Santa María de Punilla	Las Pelotas, Charly García, CJ Ramone, Almafuerte, Kapanga, Skay Beilinson, Calle 13, Ciro y los Persas y No Te Va Gustar
2012	Santa María de Punilla	Charly García, Ciro y Los Persas, Rata Blanca, Casi Justicia Social, Malón, Anthrax, La Vela Puerca, Las Pastillas del Abuelo, Illya Kuryaki and the Valderramas, Calle 13, Skay Beilinson, Kapanga, Viejas Locas, Utopians
2013	Santa María de Punilla	Charly García, Las Pelotas, Ciro y Los Persas, La Vela Puerca, Las Pastillas del Abuelo, Catupecu Machu, Almafuerte, Exodus, El Bordo, Illya Kuryaki and the Valderramas, Kapanga, Viejas Locas, Pedro Aznar, David Lebón, Molotov, Babasonicos, Eruca Sativa, La Que Faltaba
2014	Santa María de Punilla	Charly García, Las Pelotas, Ciro y Los Persas, Skay Beilinson, Las Pastillas del Abuelo, Babasonicos, Viejas Locas, Illya Kuryaki and the Valderramas, Calle 13, La Vela Puerca, León Gieco, Catupecu Machu, Carajo, Eruca Sativa, Guasones, Ivan Noble, Los Gardelitos, Salta La Banca, El Bordo, La 25, Dread Mar-I, Almafuerte, Horcas, La Beriso, Vorax, Coalission, RonDamon, Cirse, La Que Faltaba, De La Gran Piñata
2015	Santa María de Punilla	Andrés Calamaro, Las Pelotas, Ciro y Los Persas, Skay Beilinson, Las Pastillas del Abuelo, Babasonicos, Auténticos Decadentes, Illya Kuryaki and the Valderramas, Molotov, Kapanga, Guasones, Catupecu Machu, Pez, Eruca Sativa, Don Osvaldo, Los Gardelitos, Salta La Banca, El Bordo, Viticus, Los Pericos, Almafuerte, Jóvenes Pordioseros, Horcas, La Beriso, El Kuelgue, Utopians
2016	Santa María de Punilla	Las Pelotas, The Wailers, Bersuit Vergarabat, Don Osvaldo (band), Salta La Banca, Ciro y los Persas, Las Manos de Filippi, Kapanga, Dancing Mood, Villanos, Fidel Nadal, Almafuerte, Carajo, Horcas, Jóvenes Pordioseros, El Bordo, Los Gardelitos, La Mocosa, Las Pastillas del Abuelo, No Te Va Gustar, Cielo Razzo, Eruca Sativa, Sig Ragga, Babasonicos, Massacre, La Beriso, La Vela Puerca
2017	Santa María de Punilla	Skay Beilinson, Rich Robinson, Carl Palmer, Los Fabulosos Cadillacs, Los Twist, Vox Dei, Alejandro Medina, Javier Martínez, Ricardo Soulé, Fito Páez, David Lebón, Pedro Aznar, Las Pelotas, Kapanga, La Beriso, Ciro y los Persas, Guasones, La 25, Jóvenes Pordioseros, La Vela Puerca, Los Gardelitos, Los Violadores, Exciter, Carajo, Malón, Todos Tus Muertos, Dancing Mood, Nonpalidece, Bulldog, Los Pericos, Juanse
2018	Santa María de Punilla	The Offspring, Creedence Clearwater Revisited, Residente, Skay y Los Fakires, Ratones Paranoicos, Ciro y los Persas, Las Pastillas del Abuelo, Las Pelotas, Carajo, La Vela Puerca
2019	Santa María de Punilla	Ska-P, Skay y Los Fakires, Las Pastillas del Abuelo, Las Pelotas, Babasónicos, Attaque 77, Carajo, Los Auténticos Decadentes, La Vela Puerca, No Te Va Gustar, Cuatro Pesos de Propina
2020	Santa María de Punilla	Divididos, Molotov, Él Mató a un Policía Motorizado, Duki, Babasónicos, Wos, Los Auténticos Decadentes, Louta, Cazzu, Guasones, Las Pelotas, Caballeros de la Quema, Ciro y los Persas, La Vela Puerca, Las Pastillas del Abuelo, Airbag, Hilda Lizarazu, Ratones Paranoicos, Los Gardelitos, Jóvenes Pordioseros.
2021	Suspended	Through an official statement, the organizers announced that the festival was not going to be celebrated in February 2021 due to the world pandemic. Even though the idea of celebrating it in another city and with a limited audience was considered, the event was finally suspended. This was the first time the festival was canceled.
2022	Santa María de Punilla	Skay y Los Fakires, Divididos, Ciro y los Persas, Kermesse Redonda, Las Pelotas, Guasones, Fito Páez, Los Auténticos Decadentes, Babasónicos, Turf, Eruca Sativa, La Vela Puerca, Julieta Venegas, Wos, Nonpalidece, Bandalos Chinos, Viticus, Él Mató a un Policía Motorizado, Airbag, Sara Hebe, Miranda!, Paz Carrara, El Kuelgue, Acru, Memphis la Blusera, Javier Malosetti, El Plan de la Mariposa, La Mississippi, Celeste Carballo, La Franela
2023	Santa María de Punilla	Skay y Los Fakires, Fito Páez, Divididos, Ciro y los Persas, Las Pelotas, No Te Va Gustar, Las Pastillas del Abuelo, Guasones, Babasónicos, Turf, Conociendo Rusia, Juanse, La Vela Puerca, Caras Extrañas, Bandalos Chinos, Catupecu Machu, La Delio Valdéz, Él Mató a un Policía Motorizado, Usted Señalemelo, Dillom, Rels B, LP, Tiësto, Lila Downs
2024	Santa María de Punilla	Claptone, SLASH, Steve Aoki, Babasónicos, Divididos, Tiago PZK, Lali, Airbag, Dillom, Skay y Los Fakires, Miranda!, La Vela Puerca, Los Auténticos Decadentes, Bándalos chinos, Conociendo Rusia, Dante Spinetta, La Delio Valdez, Ke Personajes, Bresh, Los Pericos y Amigos, Polenta, Nafta, Silvestre y La Naranja, Duki, Ciro Y Los Persas, YSY A, Molotov, Catupecu Machu, Las Pelotas, El Kuelgue, Las Pastillas Del Abuelo, Usted Señalemelo, Milo J, Snow Tha Product, Damas Gratis, Los caligaris, Estelares, El Zar, Los Tipitos.
