= Miranda! discography =

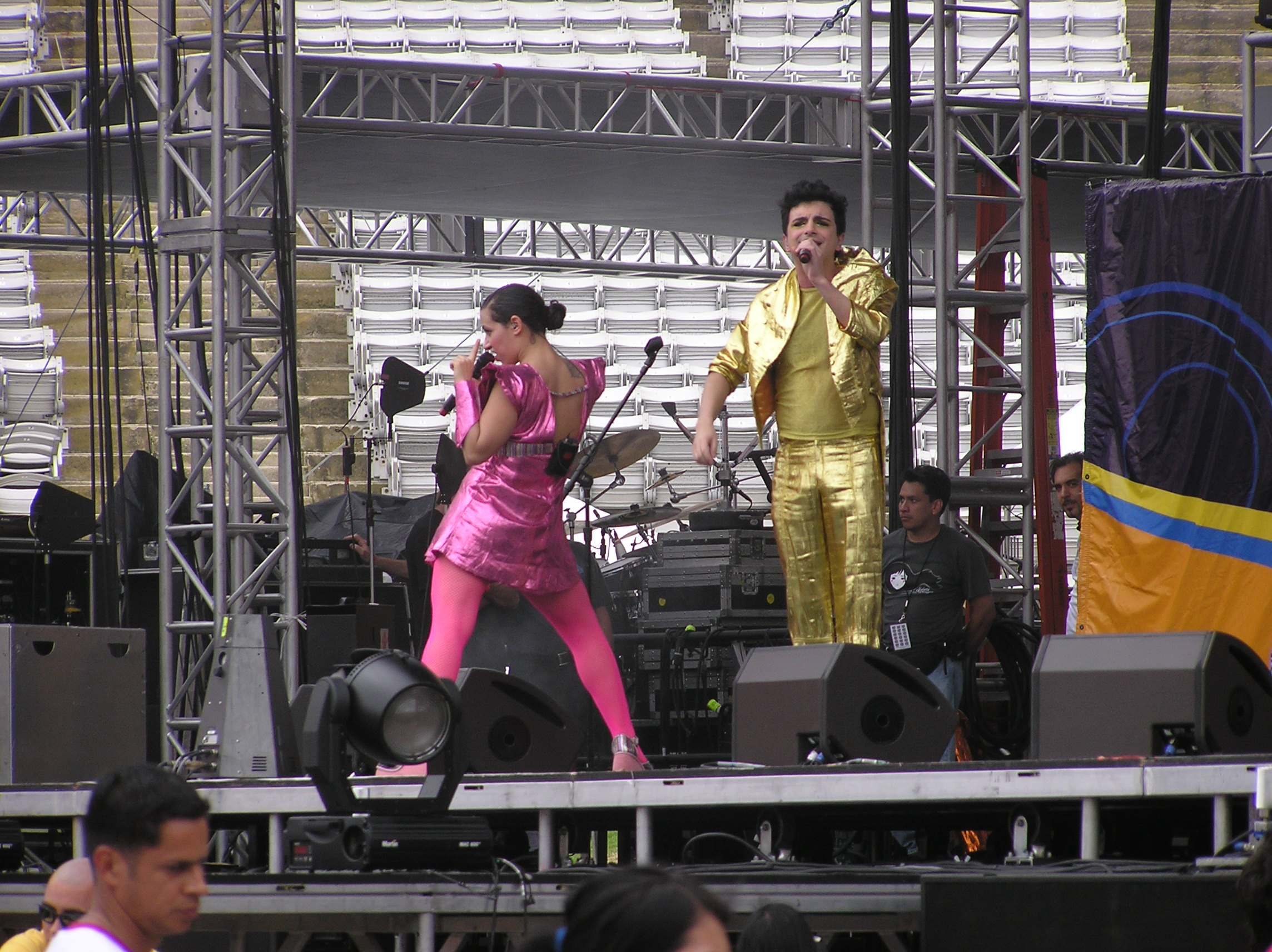
- Miranda! in Reventón Superestrella, Los Angeles, 2006
- Studio albums: 8
- EPs: 2
- Live albums: 6
- Compilation albums: 4
- Singles: 56
- Music videos: 59
- Remix albums: 1

Argentine band Miranda! has released ten studio albums, four compilation albums, two extended plays, 56 singles (including nine as featured artists) and 59 music videos. Miranda!'s first two albums, Es Mentira (2002) and Sin Restricciones (2004) were released independently by Secsy Discos. The latter was certified platinum in Argentina, Colombia and Mexico.

In 2005, they signed a four-album deal with Pelo Music. On July 20, 2006, they released their first EP titled Quereme! Tributo a las Telenovelas, containing three new tracks that were formerly the theme songs of successful Argentine telenovelas. In 2007, they released El Disco de Tu Corazón, which topped the Argentine Albums chart, being their first to do so. Miranda Es Imposible! was released in 2009 and featured three singles. The singles "Ritmo y Decepción" and "Ya Lo Sabía", preceded their fifth studio album titled Magistral (2011), which was the band's first to chart on Spain, reaching number 90, likewise in Mexico where it reached number 92. They released their latest studio album with the label, Safari, on July 22, 2014.

In 2016 they signed with the international record company Sony Music, and a year later they released their album titled Fuerte, which had six singles, including "743" and "Quiero Vivir A Tu Lado," both of which reached the top 20 in Argentina and Uruguay. The group surprisingly released their second EP titled Precoz on December 13, 2019, which contains eight songs. After being postponed due to the COVID-19 pandemic, on May 7, 2021, they released the album Souvenir, which also featured six singles for its promotion, including they "Casi Feliz", which reached the top 13 in Uruguay.

The band's ninth studio album titled Hotel Miranda! was released on April 19, 2023, and contains 11 re-versions of hits from previous albums. It had the participation of Ca7riel, Lali Espósito, María Becerra, FMK, Emmanuel Horvilleur, Juan Ingaramo, Emilia Mernes, Cristian Castro, Francisca Valenzuela, Andrés Calamaro, Chano, Sofía Reyes and Bandalos Chinos. The songs "Don", "Navidad", "Yo Te Diré", "Uno Los Dos", "Prisionero" and "Perfecta" were released as singles between November 2022 and April 2023.

== Albums ==
=== Studio albums ===
Title	Album details	Peaks			Certifications
Title	Album details	ARG	MEX	SPA	Certifications
Es Mentira	Released: November 1, 2002; Label: Secsy Discos; Formats: CD, LP, digital download, streaming	—	—	—	
Sin Restricciones	Released: September 21, 2004; Label: Secsy Discos; Formats: CD, LP, digital download, streaming	—	11	—	AMPROFON: Platinum; CAPIF: Platinum
El Disco de Tu Corazón	Released: April 1, 2007; Label: Pelo Music; Formats: CD, LP, digital download, streaming	1	29	—	
Miranda Es Imposible!	Released: August 24, 2009; Label: Pelo Music; Formats: CD, LP, digital download, streaming	—	70	—	
Magistral	Released: September 9, 2011; Label: Pelo Music; Formats: CD, digital download, streaming	—	92	90	
Safari	Released: July 22, 2014; Label: Pelo Music; Formats: CD, LP, digital download, streaming	—	—	96	
Fuerte	Released: April 21, 2017; Label: Sony Music; Formats: CD, LP, digital download, streaming	—	—	—	
Souvenir	Released: May 7, 2021; Label: Sony Music; Formats: CD, LP, digital download, streaming	—	—	—	
Hotel Miranda!	Released: April 19, 2023; Label: Sony Music; Formats: CD, LP, digital download, streaming	—	—	—	
Nuevo Hotel Miranda!	Released: May 8, 2025; Label: Sony Music; Formats: CD, LP, digital download, streaming	—	—	—	
"—" denotes a recording that did not chart or was not released in that territory.

=== Collaborative albums ===
List of collaborative albums with selected details
Title	Studio album details
Bailar o Morir (with Lali as BOM)	Released: 3 November 2026; Label: Sony Argentina; Formats: CD, LP, streaming, digital download

=== Compilation albums ===
Title	Album details	Certifications
El Templo del Pop	Released: April 1, 2008; Label: Pelo Music; Formats: CD, digital download, streaming	PROMUSICAE: Gold
El Templo del Pop 2	Released: September 23, 2016; Label: Pelo Music; Formats: CD, digital download, streaming	
Greatest Feats	Released: August 3, 2018; Label: Pelo Music; Formats: CD, digital download, streaming	
The History 2002-2007	Released: November 9, 2018; Label: Pelo Music; Formats: CD, digital download, streaming	

=== Live albums ===
Title	Album details	Peaks	Certifications
Title	Album details	ARG	Certifications
En Vivo Sin Restricciones	Released: May 21, 2005; Label: Pelo Music; Formats: CD, digital download, streaming	—	CAPIF: Platinum
El Disco de tu Corazón - En Vivo	Released: June 5, 2007; Label: Pelo Music; Formats: CD, digital download, streaming	9	
Miranda Directo!	Released: November 10, 2009; Label: Pelo Music; Formats: CD, digital download, streaming	—	
Luna Magistral	Released: April 27, 2012; Label: Pelo Music; Formats: CD, digital download, streaming	—	
Miranda! Vivo	Released: December 11, 2015; Label: Pelo Music; Formats: CD, digital download, streaming	—	
Es Mentira Vivo	Released: March 31, 2017; Label: Pelo Music; Formats: CD, digital download, streaming	—	

== Extended plays ==
Title	Album details
Quereme! Tributo a las Telenovelas	Released: July 20, 2006; Label: Pelo Music; Formats: CD, digital download, streaming
Precoz	Released: December 13, 2019; Label: Sony Music; Formats: digital download, streaming

== Singles ==
=== As lead artist ===
List of singles as lead artist, with selected chart positions, showing year released and album name
Title	Year	Peak chart positions									Album
Title	Year	ARG	CHI	COL	ECU Pop	MEX	NIC Pop	PAR	PER	URU	Album
"Bailarina"	2003	—	—	—	—	—	—	—	—	—	Es Mentira
"Imán"	2003	—	—	—	—	—	—	—	—	—	Es Mentira
"Tu Juego"	2003	—	—	—	—	—	—	—	—	—	Es Mentira
"Romix"	2004	—	—	—	—	—	—	—	—	—	Es Mentira
"Agua"	2004	—	—	—	—	—	—	—	—	—	Es Mentira
"Yo Te Diré"	2004	17	4	—	—	—	—	—	—	—	Sin Restricciones
"Navidad"	2004	—	—	—	—	—	—	—	—	—	Sin Restricciones
"Don"	2005	6	2	—	—	—	—	—	—	—	Sin Restricciones
"El Profe"	2005	—	—	—	—	—	—	—	—	—	Sin Restricciones
"Uno Los Dos"	2006	—	—	—	—	—	—	—	—	—	Sin Restricciones
"Traición"	2006	12	—	—	—	—	—	—	—	—	Sin Restricciones
"Prisionero"	2007	1	31	—	—	—	—	—	—	—	El Disco de Tu Corazón
"Perfecta" (with Julieta Venegas)	2007	3	20	2	—	3	—	—	26	—	El Disco de Tu Corazón
"Enamorada"	2007	4	91	—	—	97	—	—	—	36	El Disco de Tu Corazón
"Hola"	2008	—	—	—	—	—	—	—	—	—	El Disco de Tu Corazón
"Mentía"	2009	—	8	—	—	—	—	—	—	17	Miranda Es Imposible!
"Lo Que Siento Por Tí"	2009	—	—	—	—	—	—	—	—	—	Miranda Es Imposible!
"Tu Misterioso Alguien"	2010	2	—	—	—	—	—	—	—	—	Miranda Es Imposible!
"Ritmo y Decepción"	2010	12	—	—	—	—	—	—	—	—	Magistral
"Ya Lo Sabía"	2011	4	—	—	—	—	—	—	—	—	Magistral
"Dice Lo Que Siente"	2012	—	—	—	—	—	—	—	—	—	Magistral
"Puro Talento"	2012	—	—	—	—	—	—	—	—	—	Magistral
"Extraño"	2013	19	—	—	—	—	—	—	—	—	Safari
"Fantasmas"	2014	11	—	—	—	—	—	—	—	—	Safari
"Nadie Como Tú"	2015	—	—	—	—	—	—	—	—	—	Safari
"743"	2016	13	—	—	—	—	—	—	—	13	Fuerte
"Quiero Vivir A Tu Lado"	2017	17	—	—	—	—	—	—	—	15	Fuerte
"En Esta Noche"	2017	7	—	—	—	—	—	—	—	—	Fuerte
"Enero"	2017	—	—	—	—	—	—	—	—	—	Fuerte
"Cálido y Rojo"	2017	—	—	—	—	—	—	—	—	—	Fuerte
"Tu Padre"	2018	20	—	—	—	—	—	—	—	—	Fuerte
"Lejos De Vos"	2018	—	—	—	—	—	—	—	—	—	Non-album singles
"La Colisión"	2018	—	—	—	—	—	—	—	—	—	Non-album singles
"Me Gustas Tanto"	2019	74	—	—	—	—	—	—	—	—	Souvenir
"Un Tiempo"	2019	—	—	—	—	—	—	—	—	—	Souvenir
"Casi Feliz"	2020	—	—	—	—	—	—	—	—	13	Souvenir
"Luna De Papel"	2020	79	—	—	—	—	—	—	—	—	Souvenir
"Entre Las Dos" (with Javiera Mena)	2020	—	—	—	—	—	—	—	—	—	Souvenir
"Por Amar Al Amor"	2021	97	—	—	—	—	—	—	—	—	Souvenir
"El Arte De Recuperarte"	2022	—	—	—	—	—	—	—	—	—	Non-album singles
"Dos" (with Dillom)	2022	81	—	—	—	—	—	—	—	—	Non-album singles
"Don" (with Ca7riel)	2022	40	—	—	—	—	—	—	—	—	Hotel Miranda!
"Navidad" (with Bandalos Chinos)	2022	—	—	—	—	—	—	—	—	—	Hotel Miranda!
"Yo Te Diré" (with Lali)	2023	26	—	—	—	—	—	—	—	—	Hotel Miranda!
"Uno Los Dos" (with Emilia)	2023	15	—	—	—	—	—	—	—	—	Hotel Miranda!
"Prisionero" (with Cristian Castro)	2023	61	—	—	—	—	—	—	—	—	Hotel Miranda!
"Perfecta (Versión 2023)" (with María Becerra and FMK)	2023	6	—	—	7	—	14	12	— (Note: "Perfecta (Versión 2023)" did not enter the Monitor Latino Perú General chart but peaked at number 7 on the Monitor Latino Perú Pop chart.)	14	Hotel Miranda!
"—" denotes a title that was not released or did not chart in that territory. "*" indicates a chart that did not exist at the time.

=== As featured artist ===
List of singles as lead artist, with selected chart positions, showing year released and album name
Title	Year	Peak chart positions	Album
Title	Year	ARG	Album
"La Memoria De Los Sentimientos" (Santiago Cruz featuring Miranda!)	2019	—	Elementales
"Niebla Rosada (En Vivo)" (Los Tabaleros featuring Miranda!)	2020	—	Una Noche en el Paraíso Escondido (En Vivo)
"Lo Sabía" (Babi featuring Miranda!)	2020	—	Non-album single
"Cálido y Rojo" (Benjamín Amadeo featuring Miranda!)	2020	89	Non-album single
"Pasaporte" (Celli featuring Miranda!)	2021	—	Reset, Las Sesiones
"Juan Y Paul" (Esteman featuring Miranda!)	2021	—	Si Volviera A Nacer
"Respirar" (URI featuring Miranda!)	2021	—	Non-album single
"Papeles" (Oscu featuring Miranda!)	2022	—	Non-album single
"Cuento Los Días" (Bambi featuring Miranda!)	2022	—	República De La Nostalgia
"Mago" (Los Caligaris featuring Miranda!)	2023	—	Non-album single

== Other charted songs ==
List of singles as lead artist, with selected chart positions, showing year released and album name
Title	Year	Peak positions	Album
Title	Year	ARG	Album
"Mentía" (with Chano)	2023	30	Hotel Miranda!
"Tu Misterioso Alguien" (with Andrés Calamaro)	2023	1	Hotel Miranda!

== Guest appearances ==
List of guest appearances showing year released and album name
Title	Year	Other artist(s)	Album
"Gran Amistad"	2013	—N/a	Caídos del Mapa (Original Motion Picture Soundtrack)
"Cena Para 4"	2016	Pimpinela	Non-album single
"Plata Plata Plata"	2021	Ecko, Original Cast of Días De Gallos	Días De Gallos (Música Original de la Serie de HBO Max)
"Bailando"	2022	Los Auténticos Decadentes	ADN (Capítulo D)
"O"	2022	Alice Wonder	Que Se Joda Todo Lo Demás

== Music videos ==
List of music videos, showing year released and directors
Title	Year	Other artist(s)	Director(s)	Ref.
As lead artist
"Bailarina"	2003	None	Grupo Doma	
"Imán"	2003	None	Mariela Bond	
"Tu Juego"	2003	None	José Wolf	
"Romix"	2004	None	Alejandro Abramovich	
"Agua"	2004	None	Rodrigo Pisa	
"Yo Te Diré"	2004	None	Juan Schnitman	
"Navidad"	2004	None	Joaquín Cambre	
"Don"	2005	None	Joaquín Cambre	
"El Profe"	2005	None	Joaquín Cambre	
"Uno Los Dos"	2006	None	Joaquín Cambre	
"Traición"	2006	None	Joaquín Cambre	
"Prisionero"	2007	None	Joaquín Cambre	
"Perfecta"	2007	None	Joaquín Cambre	
"Enamorada"	2007	None	Mariela Bond	
"Hola"	2008	None	Fernando Alhadeff	
"Mentía"	2009	None	Iván Vaccaro	
"Lo Que Siento Por Tí"	2009	None	Iván Vaccaro	
"Tu Misterioso Alguien"	2010	None	Iván Vaccaro	
"Ritmo y Decepción"	2010	None	Leonardo Damario	
"Ya Lo Sabía"	2011	None	Leonardo Damario	
"Dice Lo Que Siente"	2012	None	Leonardo Damario	
"Puro Talento"	2012	None	Gonzalo López	
"Extraño"	2013	None	Guillermo Martínez - Nicolás D'Amico	
"Fantasmas"	2014	None	Diego Tucci	
"Nadie Como Tú"	2015	None	Unknown	
"743"	2016	None	Joaquín Cambre	
"En Esta Noche"	2017	None	Unknown	
"Enero"	2017	Jesús Navarro	GAFF - Gil Cerezo	
"Cálido y Rojo"	2017	None	Leonardo Damario	
"Tu Padre"	2018	None	Leonardo Damario	
"Lejos De Vos"	2018	None	Soledad Calvano - Aníbal Santangelo	
"La Colisión"	2018	None	Joaquín Cambre	
"Me Gustas Tanto"	2019	None	Lindatv	
"Un Tiempo"	2019	None	Daniel Ortega - Pablo D'Alo Abba	
"Casi Feliz"	2020	None	Hernán Guerschuny	
"Luna De Papel"	2020	None	Tomás Wurschmidt - Paz Elduayen	
"Entre Las Dos"	2020	Javiera Mena	Alejandro Ros	
"Por Amar Al Amor"	2021	None	Alejandro Ros	
"Caía La Noche"	2021	None	Alejandro Ros	
"El Arte De Recuperarte"	2022	None	Dante Zaballa	
"Dos"	2022	Dillom	Daniel Ortega	
"Don"	2022	Ca7riel	Melanie Anton Def	
"Navidad"	2022	Bandalos Chinos	Melanie Anton Def	
"Yo Te Diré"	2023	Lali Espósito	Melanie Anton Def	
"Uno Los Dos"	2023	Emilia Mernes	Melanie Anton Def	
"Prisionero"	2023	Cristian Castro	Melanie Anton Def	
"Perfecta (Versión 2023)"	2023	María Becerra and FMK	Melanie Anton Def	
"Mentia"	2023	Chano	Melanie Anton Def	
"Enamorada"	2023	Francisca Valenzuela	Melanie Anton Def	
"Traición"	2023	Emmanuel Horvilleur and Juan Ingaramo	Melanie Anton Def	
"Tu Misterioso Alguien"	2023	Andrés Calamaro	Melanie Anton Def	
