= Juliana Gattas =

Argentine singer

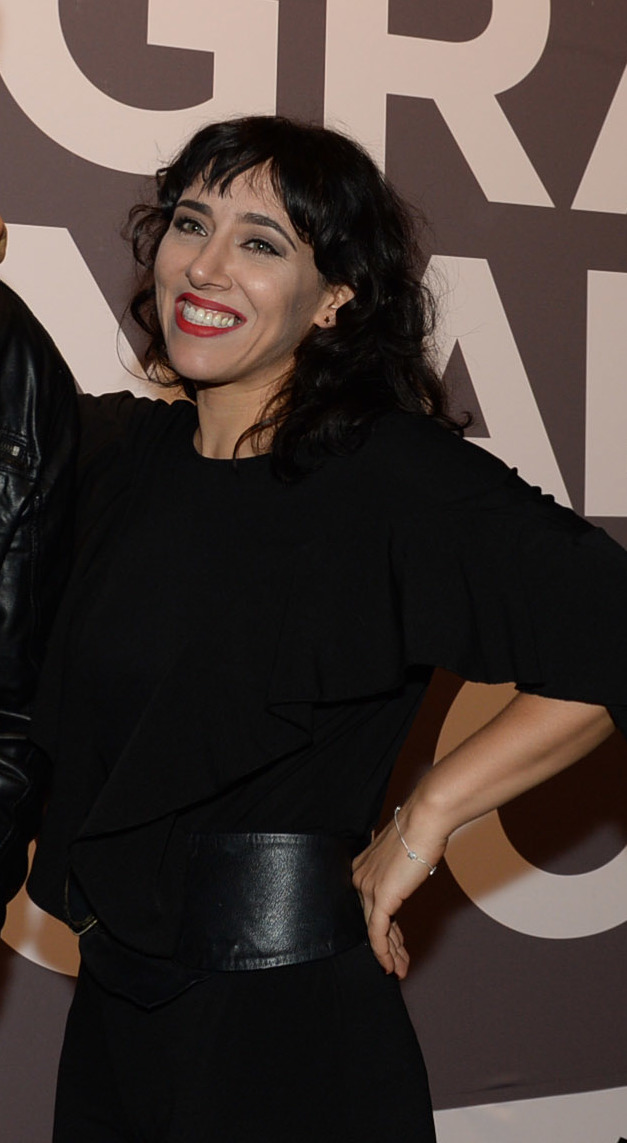
- Gattas in 2016
- Born: 1 August 1978 (age 47); Buenos Aires, Argentina
- Occupations: Singer, actress
- Years active: 1997–present
- Relatives: Juana Carreras

Juliana Gattas (born August 1, 1978, in Buenos Aires) is an Argentine singer and actress. She is recognized as one of the founding members and lead vocalists of the pop group miranda!, which formed in 2001 alongside Alejandro Sergi.

== Early life ==
In her early years, She enjoyed divas, Hollywood stars, and classic films. Gattas greatly admired Federico Fellini. She cites Annie Lennox and Boy George as inspirations. She knew she wanted to sing, although she began studying seriously at the age of fifteen; in the meantime she did theater, ceramics and painting.

== Early career (1997–2001) ==
Before joining the group Miranda! she made a living as a jazz singer between 1997 and 1998 and her audience was generally limited to bars and small dance complexes. However, during a jazz concert, she met Alejandro Sergi and a friendship arose between them. They discovered that they had similar musical tastes and common goals and decided to form a musical group. Together they formed the duo called "Lirio", where he played the role of programmer, reworking jazz songs in an electronic style and she sang. For their performances, Alejandro Sergi decided to compose his own song called "Imán", and when he played it live they saw that the reactions were positive. Leandro Fuentes, known as "Lolo", was one of the people in the audience, and being fascinated by their performance, he decided to approach them to form a band.

== Miranda! (2001–present) ==
She formed Miranda! in 2001, along with singer Alejandro Sergi, guitarist Leandro Fuentes ("Lolo"), and programmer Bruno de Vincenti. The band made their stage debut that same month. In November 2002, the quartet released their first album, titled Es Mentira (It's a Lie). It was later released by Secsy Discos in association with the television channel Locomotion.

In 2011, the Magistral album was released, which contains ten songs produced by Cachorro López and composed by Alejandro Sergi.

In 2019, they released the EP Precoz album. For the album, the duo won a Gardel Award in 2020.In 2024, she released her solo album, "Maquillada en la cama," featuring compositions by Chilean musician Alex Anwandter.

== Discography ==
=== Studio albums with Miranda! ===
- 2002: Es Mentira
- 2004: Sin Restricciones
- 2007: El Disco de Tu Corazón
- 2009: Miranda Es Imposible!
- 2011: Magistral
- 2014: Safari
- 2017: Fuerte
- 2021: Souvenir
- 2023: Hotel Miranda!
- 2025: Nuevo Hotel Miranda!

=== Solo albums ===
- 2024: Maquillada en la Cama
- 2023: Maquillada en la cama
- 2023: Borracha en un baño ajeno
- 2024: Emocionalmente tuya

== Television and film appearances ==
- La Voz (2012, 2025)
- Elegidos (2015)
- Pasado de Copas (2018)
- Pasapalabra (2021)
- Los domingos mueren más personas (2024)

=== TVP ===
- Tomate la Tarde (2016)
- De otro planeta (2017)
