= Hotel Miranda! =

2023 remix album by Miranda!

Studio album by Miranda!
- Released: 19 April 2023
- Genre: Latin pop
- Length: 37:29
- Language: Spanish
- Label: Sony Music Argentina
- Producer: Alejandro Sergi; Evlay; Mauro de Tomasso; Big One; Brian Taylor; Didi Gutman; Jay de la Cueva; Gabriel Lucena; Renzo Luca; Cachorro López

Miranda! chronology
Souvenir (2021)	Hotel Miranda! (2023)

Singles from Hotel Miranda!
- 1. "Don" Released: 7 November 2022; 2. "Navidad" Released: 8 December 2022; 3. "Yo Te Diré" Released: 20 January 2023; 4. "Uno los Dos" Released: 24 February 2023; 5. "Prisionero" Released: 21 March 2023; 6. "Perfecta" Released: 18 April 2023

Hotel Miranda! is the ninth studio album by Argentine electropop band Miranda!, released on 19 April 2023 by Sony Music Argentina. It features eleven re-recorded songs, originally from previous albums of the group, and contains guest vocals by singers Ca7riel, Lali, María Becerra, FMK, Emmanuel Horvilleur, Juan Ingaramo, Emilia, Cristian Castro, Francisca Valenzuela, Andrés Calamaro, Chano, Sofía Reyes and Bandalos Chinos.

Hotel Miranda! was preceded by the release of six singles between November 2022 and April 2023: "Don", "Navidad", "Yo Te Diré", "Uno los Dos", "Prisionero" and "Perfecta".

At the 26th Annual Premios Gardel, the album won the Album of the Year award (also known as Gardel de Oro), the most important award of the night. It also won Best Pop Group Album and Best Long-Form Music Video.

== Background ==
After a tour of festivals in countries like Argentina and Chile, the band made a mysterious post announcing that a piece of news would be published. The official announcement of the album was through a two-minute trailer posted on the band's social networks on October 25, 2022. The band posted the cover art of the album on April 17, 2023.

== Concept and title ==
Hotel Miranda! is an album in which they remade old songs from albums such as El Disco de Tu Corazón and Sin Restricciones, with new productions and in collaboration with different singers, producers and writers, such as Evlay, Gabriel Lucena, Cachorro López, Big One, among others. The "hotel" is the place that the band came up with to represent a stage and universe to "celebrate their music," said Juliana Gattas.

Alejandro Sergi said that Hotel Miranda! is "a celebration" of their repertoire and their career:

"Our new album is the most ambitious project we have embarked on. Reversions of our classics with guest singers and different producers. To all this we add the idea that the record is an audiovisual work. Each song has its video, and all the videos are linked together in a sequence that shows the day-to-day activities of the peculiar Hotel Miranda! and their mysterious owners."

== Accolades ==
Year	Ceremony	Category	Result	Ref.
2024	Premios Gardel	Album of the Year	Won	
2024	Premios Gardel	Best Pop Group Album	Won	
2024	Premios Gardel	Best Long-Form Music Video	Won	
2024	Premios Gardel	Producer of the Year	Nominated	

== Promotion ==
=== Singles ===
Miranda! kicked off the Hotel Miranda! era with the release of "Don", featuring Ca7riel. The lead single was released on November 7, 2022. Between December 2022 and January 2023 they released two songs: "Navidad" with Bandalos Chinos, and "Yo Te Diré" with Lali Espósito, both songs originally of the Sin Restricciones album. The latter, in its video clip directed by Melanie Anton Def, has references to the films The Shining and Psycho.

The fourth single, "Uno los Dos", with Emilia Mernes, was released on February 23. It was their first song to reach the top 15 of the Billboard Argentina Hot 100, since its creation in 2018. "Prisionero", in collaboration with the Mexican singer Cristian Castro, was announced on March 17 and released three days after.

"Perfecta", the last single, was announced on April 12 and released six days after. It features guest vocals and composition of singers María Becerra and FMK. The track peaked at number 8 on the Billboard Argentina Hot 100, being the band's first song to reach the top ten of the chart in that country.

=== Tour ===
The Hotel Miranda! tour was Miranda!'s eighth concert tour. The band announced the first leg, in Latin America, in their social media. Comprising thirteen dates, the leg began on April 21, 2023, in Buenos Aires, and concluded on November 29, 2023, in Mexico City.

== Track listing ==
Hotel Miranda! track listing
No.	Title	Writer(s)	Producer(s)	Length
1.	"Don" (with Ca7riel)	Alejandro Sergi	Evlay	3:09
2.	"Yo Te Diré" (with Lali)	Sergi	Sergi; Mauro de Tomasso	3:27
3.	"Perfecta" (with María Becerra and FMK)	Sergi; FMK; María Becerra	Big One	3:41
4.	"Traición" (with Emmanuel Horvilleur and Juan Ingaramo)	Sergi	Brian Taylor	3:04
5.	"Uno los Dos" (with Emilia)	Sergi	Big One; Didi Gutman	3:35
6.	"Prisionero" (with Cristian Castro)	Sergi	Jay de la Cueva	3:55
7.	"Enamorada" (with Francisca Valenzuela)	Sergi	Sergi; Gabriel Lucena	3:08
8.	"Tu Misterioso Alguien" (with Andrés Calamaro)	Sergi	Sergi; Lucena	3:59
9.	"Mentía" (with Chano)	Sergi	Renzo Luca	3:18
10.	"Ya Lo Sabía" (with Sofía Reyes)	Sergi; Juliana Gattas	Evlay	2:54
11.	"Navidad" (with Bandalos Chinos)	Sergi	Cachorro López	3:14
Total length:				37:29

== Credits and personnel ==
Credits adapted from Jaxsta.

- Alejandro Sergi – lead vocals, composition, production (2, 7, 8), programming (11), recording engineer (6), guitar (5), synthesizer (2, 7, 8, 11)
- Juliana Gattas – lead vocals, composition (10)
- Ca7riel – lead vocals (1), guitar (1)
- Lali – lead vocals (2)
- María Becerra – lead vocals (3), composition (3)
- FMK – lead vocals (3), composition (3)
- Emmanuel Horvilleur – lead vocals (4)
- Juan Ingaramo – lead vocals (4)
- Emilia – lead vocals (5)
- Cristian Castro – lead vocals (6)
- Francisca Valenzuela – lead vocals (7)
- Andrés Calamaro – lead vocals (8)
- Chano – lead vocals (9)
- Sofía Reyes – lead vocals (10)
- Bandalos Chinos – lead vocals (11)
- Evlay – production (1, 10), mixing (1, 10), guitar (10), synthesizer (1, 10)
- Mauro de Tomasso – production (2), synthesizer (2)
- Big One – production (3, 5), mixing (3, 5), synthesizer (3, 5)
- Brian Taylor – production (4), guitar (4), synthesizer (4)
- Didi Gutman – production (5), synthesizer (5)
- Jay de la Cueva – production (6), bass (6), drums (6), guitar (2, 6)
- Gabriel Lucena – production (7, 8), bass (8), guitar (7), synthesizer (7, 8)
- Renzo Luca – production (9), synthesizer (9)
- Cachorro López – production (11), programming (11), synthesizer (11)
- Demián Nava Zambrini – programming (11), recording engineer (11), synthesizer (11)
- Javier Caso – A&R assistant (1), mixing (2)
- Diego Mendoza – assistant engineer (6)
- Javier Fracchia – mastering (1, 2, 11)
- Peter Hewitt-Dutton – mastering
- César Sogbe – mixing (7, 8, 11)
- Edu Pereyra – mixing (9)
- Gerardo Ordoñez – mixing (6), recording engineer (6)
- Bobby Sparks – keyboards (6)
- Ludo Morell – synthesizer (8)

== Release history ==
Release history and formats for Hotel Miranda!
Region	Date	Format	Label	Ref.
Various	19 April 2023	CD; Digital download; streaming	Sony Music Argentina	
