= La Voz Argentina season 1 =

La Voz Argentina
- Season 1
- Hosted by: Marley; Luli Fernández (Backstage)
- Coaches: Axel; Soledad Pastorutti; Miranda! (Ale Sergi and Juliana Gattas); Puma Rodríguez
- Winner: Gustavo Corvalán
- Runner-up: Mariano Poblete

Release
- Original network: Telefe
- Original release: 1 July – 2 December 2012

Season chronology
- Next → Season 2

The first season of La Voz... Argentina began on 1 July 2012 and was broadcast by Telefe. It was hosted by Marley, with model Luli Fernández interviewing the contestants at the backstage.

Contestants were also allowed to submit an online application in 2011. For the online auditions, contestants were required to record a song with a webcam.

This was the second Latin American version in The Voice franchise, after the Mexican version, La Voz... México.

== Coaches and presenters ==
The show is hosted by Marley, with model Luli Fernández interviewing the contestants backstage. This will be the second time that Marley will be hosting a singing competition, after hosting the Argentine version of Operación Triunfo, for 4 seasons.

After a lot of rumours, the coaches for the show are: Latin pop singer Axel, folk singer Soledad Pastorutti, the vocals of the electro pop band Miranda!, Ale Sergi and Juliana Gattas, and Venezuelan singer José Luis "Puma" Rodríguez.

== Teams ==
Color key

- Winner
- Runner-up
- Third place
- Fourth place
- Eliminated in the Live shows
- Eliminated in the Sing-off
- Eliminated in the Battles

Coaches	Top 68 artists			
Axel				
Axel	Mateo Iturbide	María Inés Roller	Silvia Fernández	Nicolás Sosa
Axel	Gonzalo Rodríguez	Georgina Moreiro	Juan Manuel Enrique	Pamela Duarte
Axel	Marcela Wonder	Gustavo Mougel	Matías Latorre	Gabriela Muñoz
Axel	Ariel Leone	Ana B. Medina	Y. Hernández	Gianina Giunta
Axel	Ezequiel Fernanz			
Soledad				
Soledad	Gustavo Corvalán	Iván Di Paolo	Laura Dimonti	Mario Suárez
Soledad	Nacho Leguizamón	Daniela Mazzitelli	Margarita Hegglin	Victoria Escudero
Soledad	Antonella Ballarini	Gisella Tagliarino	Antonio Salvatore	Germán Staffolani
Soledad	María Cecilia Vila	Amparo Ringler	Naara Revelli	Claudia Torgen
Soledad	Victoria Carambat			
Miranda!				
Miranda!	Mariano Poblete	Miguel Ángel Roda	Pablo Utrera	Gonzalo Andrada
Miranda!	Natalia Nekare	Fernando Pernia	Maia Contreras	Daniela Oloco
Miranda!	Laura La Paz	Nancy Ruiz	Marina Pinal	Cecilia Palizza
Miranda!	Agustina Romero	Claudio Giménez	María B. Correa	Denisse Yarrouge
Miranda!	Martín Alderete			
El Puma				
El Puma	Antonela Cirillo	José Luis Bartolilla	Jordana Battaglia	Alejandro Serra
El Puma	Melina Imhoff	Dennis Smith	Adriel Montanari	Antonella Oddi
El Puma	Agustina Keena	Milena Catania	Franco Ibáñez	Jesica Mina
El Puma	Amilcar Vicente	Eugenia Quevedo	Martín Bruno	Emiliano Bernal
El Puma	Verónica Sardaña			

== Blind auditions ==
Color key

✔	Coach hit his/her "I WANT YOU" button
	Artist defaulted to this coach's team
	Artist elected to join this coach's team
	Artist eliminated with no coach pressing his or her "I WANT YOU" button

=== Episode 1 (1 July) ===
Order	Artist	Age	Song	Coach's and contestant's choices			
Order	Artist	Age	Song	Axel	Soledad	Miranda!	El Puma
1	Nicolás Sosa	21	"Te vi venir"	✔	✔	—	✔
2	Daniela Olocco	25	"Ironic"	✔	✔	✔	✔
3	María Inés Roller	18	"Beautiful"	✔	✔	✔	✔
4	Diego Huenchucoy	26	"Garganta con arena"	—	—	—	—
5	Dennis Smith	31	"What a Wonderful World"	—	✔	—	✔
6	Margarita Hegglin	24	"Stand by Me"	✔	✔	—	—
7	Martín Bruno	30	"Corazón Espinado"	—	✔	✔	✔
8	Antonella Vacari	20	"Someone like You"	—	—	—	—
9	Mario Suárez	24	"Zamba para olvidar"	✔	✔	✔	✔
10	Mariano Poblete	21	"Oh! Darling"	✔	✔	✔	✔

Other Performances

Order	Artists	Song
1	Los Coaches: Axel, Soledad, Miranda!, and El Puma	"Himno de mi corazón"

=== Episode 2 (9 July) ===
Order	Artist	Age	Song	Coach's and contestant's choices			
Order	Artist	Age	Song	Axel	Soledad	Miranda!	El Puma
1	Antonela Cirillo	21	"I Have Nothing"	✔	—	✔	✔
2	Amparo Ringler	21	"Paisaje"	—	✔	—	—
3	Nicolás Valdez Ruiz	23	"Entre la tierra y el cielo"	—	—	—	—
4	Silvia Fernández	40	"Alfonsina y el mar"	✔	—	—	—
5	Daniela Mazzitelli	26	"The Greatest Love of All"	✔	✔	✔	✔
6	Mateo Iturbide	24	"Is This Love"	✔	✔	✔	✔
7	Mayco Walker	26	"La Incondicional"	—	—	—	—
8	Maia Contreras	28	"Amazing Grace"	—	✔	✔	✔
9	Agustina Keena	21	"Cuando amas a alguien"	—	—	—	✔
10	Víctor "Bomba" Allende	23	"Kilómetros"	—	—	—	—
11	Pablo Utrera	24	"This Love"	✔	—	✔	—

Other Performances

Order	Artists	Song
1	Soledad and Amparo Ringler	"Tren del cielo"

=== Episode 3 (15 July) ===
Order	Artist	Age	Song	Coach's and contestant's choices			
Order	Artist	Age	Song	Axel	Soledad	Miranda!	El Puma
1	Miguel Lencina	21	"Mujer, niña y amiga"	—	—	—	—
2	Gianina Giunta	23	"Dancing Queen"	✔	—	—	—
3	Juan Manuel Enrique	26	"Te voy a amar"	✔	✔	✔	✔
4	Georgina Moreiro	18	"Love of My Life"	✔	✔	✔	—
5	Florencia Barisone	25	"Piano Man"	—	—	—	—
6	José Luis Bartolilla	25	"Separate Lives"	✔	✔	✔	✔
7	Agustina Romero	21	"Nada"	—	✔	✔	—
8	René Carreira	47	"Un beso y una flor"Nino Bravo	—	—	—	—
9	Gustavo Mougel	18	"Heal the World"	✔	—	✔	—
10	Franco Ibáñez	20	"Cálido y frío"	✔	✔	—	✔
11	Laura Dimonti	29	"Te quiero, te quiero"	—	✔	✔	✔
12	Alejandro Serra	26	"Seguir viviendo sin tu amor"	✔	✔	—	✔
13	Natalia Nekare	26	"Crazy"	—	—	✔	—

Other Performances

Order	Artists	Song
1	Axel	"Te voy a amar"

=== Episode 4 (22 July) ===
Order	Artist	Age	Song	Coach's and contestant's choices			
Order	Artist	Age	Song	Axel	Soledad	Miranda!	El Puma
1	Iván di Paolo	22	"Rolling in the Deep"	✔	✔	✔	✔
2	Marcela Wonder	25	"La soledad"	✔	—	✔	✔
3	Gabriel Salazar	20	"Celebra la vida"	—	—	—	—
4	Eugenia Quevedo	20	"Pero me acuerdo de ti"	—	—	—	✔
5	Gustavo Corvalán	23	"Vuélveme a querer"	✔	✔	✔	✔
6	Antonella Oddi	24	"Save Me"	—	—	—	✔
7	Diego Aramburu	33	"Crimen"	—	—	—	—
8	Ana Belén Medina	21	"Solamente tú"	✔	—	✔	—
9	Ezequiel Fernanz	34	"We Are the Champions"	✔	—	—	—
10	María Belén Correa	22	"La pomeña"	—	—	✔	—
11	Miguel Angel Roda	20	"Como dos extraños"	—	—	✔	—
12	Romina Scalisi	33	"Out here on my own"	—	—	—	—
13	Fernando Pernia	33	"Is This Love"	✔	✔	✔	✔

Other Performances

Order	Artists	Song
1	El Puma	"De punta a punta"

=== Episode 5 (29 July) ===
Order	Artist	Age	Song	Coach's and contestant's choices			
Order	Artist	Age	Song	Axel	Soledad	Miranda!	El Puma
1	Victoria Escudero	23	"I Have Nothing"	✔	✔	✔	—
2	Gonzalo "Sony" Rodríguez	19	"A puro dolor"	✔	—	✔	—
3	Antonella Merchak	19	"Sweet Child O' Mine"Guns N' Roses	—	—	—	—
4	Adriel Montanari	22	"No me doy por vencido"	—	—	—	✔
5	Laura La Paz	26	"Heróe"	✔	—	✔	—
6	Jordana Battaglia	24	"The power of love"	—	—	—	✔
7	Yanina Hernández	23	"Love of My Life"	✔	✔	✔	✔
8	Sergio Gómez	26	"Rayando el sol"	—	—	—	—
9	Nancy Ruiz de Peralta	27	"No me enseñaste"	—	—	✔	—
10	Gabriela Muñoz	22	"Muchacha Ojos de papel"	✔	—	—	—
11	Ezequiel Bazán	21	"Ven entrégame tu amor"	—	—	—	—
12	Claudia Torgen	26	"La pomeña"	—	✔	—	—
13	Victoria Carambat	22	"The Shoop Shoop Song"	✔	✔	—	—

Other Performances

Order	Artists	Song
1	Soledad and Marley	"Garganta con arena"

=== Episode 6 (5 August) ===
Order	Artist	Age	Song	Coach's and contestant's choices			
Order	Artist	Age	Song	Axel	Soledad	Miranda!	El Puma
1	Jesica Mina	25	"Rolling in the Deep"	✔	✔	✔	✔
2	Claudio Giménez	21	"Rezo por vos"Charly García	—	—	✔	—
3	Claudio Álvarez	43	"Garganta con arena"	—	—	—	—
4	Marina Pinal	29	"Killing Me Softly with His Song"	—	—	✔	—
5	Ariel Leone	28	"Persiana americana"	✔	—	—	—
6	Cecilia Palizza	40	"The Shoop Shoop Song"	—	—	✔	—
7	Matías Latorre	29	"Mujer, niña y amiga"	✔	✔	✔	✔
8	María José Carma	23	"Si tú no estás aquí"	—	—	—	—
9	Laura Carati	35	"Like A Virgin"	—	—	—	—
10	Antonio Salvatore	27	"La distancia"	—	✔	—	—
11	Antonella Ballerini	23	"Just the Way You Are"	—	✔	—	—
12	Melina Imhoff	28	"Alfonsina y el mar"	—	—	—	✔
13	Emiliano Bernal	21	"A puro dolor"	—	—	—	✔
14	Juliana Pucci	18	"Tren del cielo"	—	—	—	—
15	María Cecilia Vila	19	"Rehab"	—	✔	✔	—

Other Performances

Order	Artists	Song
1	Axel	"11 y 6"
2	Axel and Soledad	"Cuando llegue el alba"Argentine Folklore

=== Episode 7 (12 August) ===
Order	Artist	Age	Song	Coach's and contestant's choices			
Order	Artist	Age	Song	Axel	Soledad	Miranda!	El Puma
1	Gonzalo Andrada	20	"More Than Words"	✔	✔	✔	✔
2	Milena Catania	24	"Just the Way You Are"	—	—	—	✔
3	Germán Staffolani	21	"Roja boca"	—	✔	—	—
4	Tamara Berman	30	"Save Me"	—	—	—	—
5	Pamela Duarte	22	"Si tú no estás aquí"	✔	✔ *	✔ *	✔ *
6	Nacho Leguizamón	18	"Zamba de usted"	—	✔	—	—
7	Verónica Sardaña	33	"En cambio no"	—	—	✔	✔
8	Denisse Yarrouge	20	"Complicated"	—	—	✔	✔
9	Naara Revelli	21	"Amazing Grace"	—	✔	—	—
10	Martín Alderete	23	"I'm Yours"	—	✔	✔	—
11	Amilcar Vicente	18	"Zamba para olvidar"	—	—	—	✔
12	Rubén Darío Vélez	25	"De música ligera"	—	—	—	—
13	Sofía Rangone	24	"Mi reflejo"	—	—	—	—
14	Gisella Tagliarino	19	"El universo sobre mí"	—	✔	—	—

- * During Pamela's Duarte blind audition, Axel was the only coach that pressed his button voluntarily, as he pressed the other judges' buttons. Even with this result, Pamela got the opportunity to choose which team to join.
- Grey charts, indicate that the coach had his team already complete.

== Battle rounds ==
After the Blind auditions, each coach had 17 contestants for the Battle rounds, which aired from 19 August. Coaches began narrowing down the playing field by training the contestants with the help of "trusted advisors". Each episode featured battles consisting of pairings from within each team, and each battle concluded with the respective coach eliminating one of the two or three contestants; the nine winners for each coach advanced to the Sing-off Round.

Color key

Artist won the Battle and advanced to the Sing-off
Artist lost the Battle and was eliminated

Episode	Order	Coach	Artists			Song
Episode 8 (19 August)	1	Soledad	Iván di Paolo	Victoria Carambat		"You're the One That I Want"
Episode 8 (19 August)	2	El Puma	Antonella Oddi	Verónica Sardaña		"Estoy aquí"
Episode 8 (19 August)	3	Miranda!	Martín Alderete	Pablo Utrera		"Beat It"
Episode 8 (19 August)	4	Axel	Ezequiel Fernanz	Nicolás Sosa		"Mientes"
Episode 8 (19 August)	5	El Puma	Dennis Smith	Emiliano Bernal	José Luis Bartolilla	"A Little Respect"
Episode 9 (26 August)	1	Axel	Gianina Giunta	María Inés Roller		"Hot Stuff"
Episode 9 (26 August)	2	Soledad	Claudia Torgen	Mario Suárez		"Amarraditos"
Episode 9 (26 August)	3	Miranda!	Daniela Olocco	Denisse Yarrouge		"Ni una sola palabra"
Episode 9 (26 August)	4	Axel	Matías Latorre	Silvia Fernández		"Amor salvaje"
Episode 9 (26 August)	5	El Puma	Alejandro Serra	Martín Bruno		"Billie Jean"
Episode 10 (2 September)	1	Soledad	Antonella Ballerini	Naara Revelli	Victoria Escudero	"Wannabe"
Episode 10 (2 September)	2	Miranda!	Gonzalo Andrada	María Belén Correa		"Tu recuerdo"
Episode 10 (2 September)	3	El Puma	Agustina Keena	Eugenia Quevedo		"Oye mi canto"
Episode 10 (2 September)	4	Soledad	Amparo Ringler	Laura Dimonti		"Cosas del amor"
Episode 10 (2 September)	5	Axel	Ana Belén Medina	Pamela Duarte		"Bachata rosa"
Episode 10 (2 September)	6	Miranda!	Claudio Giménez	Mariano Poblete		"Livin' on a Prayer"
Episode 11 (9 September)	1	Soledad	Daniela Mazzitelli	María Cecilia Vila		"Believe"
Episode 11 (9 September)	2	El Puma	Adriel Montanari	Amilcar Vicente		"Lloviendo estrellas"
Episode 11 (9 September)	3	Miranda!	Agustina Romero	Miguel Ángel Roda		"Por una cabeza"
Episode 11 (9 September)	4	Axel	Ariel Leone	Mateo Iturbide		"Salud, dinero y amor"
Episode 11 (9 September)	5	El Puma	Jesica Mina	Jordana Battaglia		"Falsas esperanzas"
Episode 12 (16 September)	1	Axel	Gabriela Muñoz	Georgina Moreiro		"¡Corre!"
Episode 12 (16 September)	2	Soledad	Germán Staffolani	Nacho Leguizamón		"Vuela una lágrima"
Episode 12 (16 September)	3	Miranda!	Cecilia Palizza	Maia Contreras	Natalia Nekare	"Man! I Feel Like a Woman!"
Episode 12 (16 September)	4	Axel	Marcela Wonder	Yanina Hernández		"Estoy aquí"
Episode 12 (16 September)	5	El Puma	Franco Ibáñez	Melina Imhoff		"Por amarte así"
Episode 12 (16 September)	6	Soledad	Antonio Salvatore	Gustavo Corvalán		"Amor narcótico"
Episode 13 (23 September)	1	Miranda!	Fernando Pernía	Marina Pinal		"I Just Can't Stop Loving You"
Episode 13 (23 September)	2	Soledad	Gisella Tagliarino	Margarita Hegglin		"Para tu amor"
Episode 13 (23 September)	3	Miranda!	Laura La Paz	Nancy Ruiz de Peralta		"Material Girl"
Episode 13 (23 September)	4	Axel	Gonzalo Rodríguez	Gustavo Mougel	Juan Manuel Enrique	"Lo mejor de mi vida eres tú"
Episode 13 (23 September)	5	El Puma	Antonela Cirillo	Milena Catania		"Respect"

Non competition performances

Episode	Artists	Song (Original artist)
9	Juanes and Soledad	"Fotografía"
11	Teen Angels	"Baja el telón" and "Llega en forma de amor"
13	El Puma and Miranda!	"Diosito Santo"

== Sing-off ==
During this round, the 9 contestants in each team, faced a new elimination: 6 of them, advanced to the live shows, while the other 3 sang the same song they sang in the blind auditions. Once they've all done their performances, the coach saved 2 contestants, and 1 was eliminated.

Color key

Artist advanced to the Live shows
Artist was sent to the Sing-off
Artist lost the Sing-off and was eliminated

Artists advancing to the Live shows
Team Soledad			Team Miranda!		
Mario Suárez	Nacho Leguizamón	Laura Dimonti	Daniela Olocco	Miguel Ángel Roda	Gonzalo Andrada
Margarita Hegglin	Daniela Mazzitelli	Gustavo Corvalán	Natalia Nekare	Pablo Utrera	Fernando Pernía
Victoria Escudero	Antonella Ballerini	Iván di Paolo	Mariano Poblete	Maia Contreras	Laura La Paz
Team El Puma			Team Axel		
José Luis Bartolilla	Antonela Cirillo	Jordana Battaglia	Mateo Iturbide	Silvia Fernández	Juan Manuel Enrique
Melina Imhoff	Denis Smith	Alejandro Serra	María Inés Roller	Pamela Duarte	Gonzalo Rodríguez
Agustina Keena	Antonella Oddi	Adriel Montanari	Marcela Wonder	Nicolás Sosa	Georgina Moreiro

Artists sent to the Sing-off
Artist	Song	Result	Artist	Song	Result
Team Soledad Sing-off details			Team Miranda! Sing-off details		
Victoria Escudero	"I Have Nothing"	Soledad's choice	Mariano Poblete	"Oh! Darling"	Miranda!'s choice
Antonella Ballerini	"Just the Way You Are"	Eliminated	Maia Contreras	"Amazing Grace"	Miranda!'s choice
Iván di Paolo	"Rolling in the Deep"	Soledad's choice	Laura La Paz	"Heróe"	Eliminated
Team El Puma Sing-off details			Team Axel Sing-off details		
Agustina Keena	"Cuando amas a alguien"	Eliminated	Marcela Wonder	"La soledad"	Eliminated
Antonella Oddi	"Save Me"	El Puma's choice	Nicolás Sosa	"Te vi venir"	Axel's choice
Adriel Montanari	"No me doy por vencido"	El Puma's choice	Georgina Moreiro	"Love of My Life"	Axel's choice

== Live shows ==
=== Results summary ===
Color key
Artist's info

- Artist from Team Axel
- Artist from Team Soledad
- Artist from Team Miranda!
- Artist from Team El Puma

Result details

- Artist was proclaimed as the winner
- Artist was proclaimed as runner-up, third, and fourth place
- Artist received the most points in his/her team and advanced to the finals
- Artist received the fewest accumulated total points and was eliminated
- Artist was saved by the public
- Artist was saved by his/her coach
- Artist was eliminated
- Artist did not perform on that particular round

Artist	Week 1		Week 2		Week 3	Week 4	Week 5	Finals
Artist	Round 1	Round 2	Round 1	Round 2	Week 3	Week 4	Week 5	Finals
Gustavo Corvalán		Safe		Bottom two	Safe	Safe	Advanced	Winner
Mariano Poblete	Safe		Safe		Safe	Safe	Advanced	Runner-up
Antonela Cirillo	Safe		Safe		Safe	Safe	Advanced	Third place
Mateo Iturbide		Safe		Bottom two	Safe	Safe	Advanced	Fourth place
Iván di Paolo		Safe		Safe	Bottom two	Bottom two	Eliminated	Eliminated (Week 5)
José Luis Bartolilla		Safe		Safe	Bottom two	Bottom two	Eliminated	Eliminated (Week 5)
María Inés Roller	Safe		Safe		Safe	Bottom two	Eliminated	Eliminated (Week 5)
Miguel Ángel Roda		Safe		Bottom two	Safe	Bottom two	Eliminated	Eliminated (Week 5)
Jordana Battaglia	Bottom two		Bottom two		Safe	Bottom two	Eliminated (Week 4)	
Laura Dimonti	Safe		Safe		Safe	Bottom two	Eliminated (Week 4)	
Pablo Utrera		Bottom two		Safe	Bottom two	Bottom two	Eliminated (Week 4)	
Silvia Fernández	Bottom two		Safe		Bottom two	Bottom two	Eliminated (Week 4)	
Alejandro Serra		Safe		Bottom two	Bottom two	Eliminated (Week 3)		
Gonzalo Andrada	Safe		Safe		Bottom two	Eliminated (Week 3)		
Mario Suárez	Safe		Bottom two		Bottom two	Eliminated (Week 3)		
Nicolás Sosa	Safe		Bottom two		Bottom two	Eliminated (Week 3)		
Gonzalo Rodríguez		Bottom two		Bottom two	Eliminated (Round 2 of Week 2)			
Melina Imhoff		Bottom two		Bottom two	Eliminated (Round 2 of Week 2)			
Nacho Leguizamón		Bottom two		Bottom two	Eliminated (Round 2 of Week 2)			
Natalia Nekare		Safe		Bottom two	Eliminated (Round 2 of Week 2)			
Daniela Mazzitelli	Bottom two		Bottom two	Eliminated (Round 1 of Week 2)				
Dennis Smith	Safe		Bottom two	Eliminated (Round 1 of Week 2)				
Fernando Pernia	Bottom two		Bottom two	Eliminated (Round 1 of Week 2)				
Georgina Moreiro	Safe		Bottom two	Eliminated (Round 1 of Week 2)				
Adriel Montanari		Bottom two	Eliminated (Round 2 of Week 1)					
Juan Manuel Enrique		Bottom two	Eliminated (Round 2 of Week 1)					
Maia Contreras		Bottom two	Eliminated (Round 2 of Week 1)					
Margarita Hegglin		Bottom two	Eliminated (Round 2 of Week 1)					
Antonella Oddi	Bottom two	Eliminated (Round 1 of Week 1)						
Daniela Olocco	Bottom two	Eliminated (Round 1 of Week 1)						
Pamela Duarte	Bottom two	Eliminated (Round 1 of Week 1)						
Victoria Escudero	Bottom two	Eliminated (Round 1 of Week 1)						

=== Live show details ===
Color key

Artist was saved by the public's vote
Artist was saved by his/her coach
Artist was saved after being part of the bottom two/three in his/her team
Artist was saved after receiving the highest accumulated coach's and public's points
Artist was eliminated

==== Week 1 ====
===== Round 1 (7, 9, & 11 October) =====
Order	Coach	Artist	Song	Result
1	Miranda!	Daniela Olocco	"Get the Party Started"	Eliminated
2	Miranda!	Fernando Pernía	"Prófugos"	Saved by Miranda!
3	Miranda!	Gonzalo Andrada	"Peligro"	Public's choice
4	Miranda!	Mariano Poblete	"You Can Leave Your Hat On"	Miranda!'s choice
5	Soledad	Victoria Escudero	"Devórame otra vez"	Eliminated
6	Soledad	Mario Suárez	"La arenosa"	Public's choice
7	Soledad	Daniela Mazzitelli	"Let's Get Loud"	Saved by Soledad
8	Soledad	Laura Dimonti	"Qué será de ti"	Soledad's choice
9	Axel	Georgina Moreiro	"Imagine"	Axel's Choice
10	Axel	Pamela Duarte	"Amor prohibido"	Eliminated
11	Axel	Nicolás Sosa	"Fuego de Noche, Nieve de Día"	Public's choice
12	Axel	Silvia Fernández	"Como la cigarra"	Saved by Axel
13	El Puma	Antonela Cirillo	"I say a little prayer"	El Puma's Choice
14	El Puma	Antonella Oddi	"Un día sin ti"	Saved by El Puma
15	El Puma	Dennis Smith	"Somebody to Love"	Public's choice
16	El Puma	Jordana Battaglia	"When Love Takes Over"	Eliminated

Non-competition performances

Episode	Order	Artist(s)	Song(s)
15	1	The Coaches	"Tengo"
15	2	Alejandro Sanz	"Se Vende"/"No me compares"
16	1	Team Miranda!	"Ya lo sabía"
16	2	Team Soledad	"La salida"
17	1	Team El Puma	"La fiesta"
17	2	Team Axel	"Brillante sobre el mic"

===== Round 2 (14, 16, & 18 October) =====
The live performances from the second part of the first round, aired on Sunday, 14 October 2012. The elimination shows were broadcast on 16 and 18 October 2012.

Order	Coach	Artist	Song	Result
1	El Puma	José Luis Bartolilla	"She"	El Puma's choice
2	El Puma	Adriel Montanari	"Suave"	Eliminated
3	El Puma	Melina Imhoff	"Hoy"	Saved by El Puma
4	El Puma	Alejandro Serra	"I Saw Her Standing There"	Public's choice
5	Axel	Mateo Iturbide	"Have You Ever Really Loved A Woman"	Public's choice
6	Axel	Gonzalo Rodríguez	"Siempre te amaré"	Saved by Axel
7	Axel	María Inés Roller	"Can't Take My Eyes Off You"	Axel's choice
8	Axel	Juan Manuel Enrique	"Corazón partío"	Eliminated
9	Miranda!	Maia Contreras	"Bad Romance"	Eliminated
10	Miranda!	Miguel Ángel Roda	"Tinta roja"	Public's choice
11	Miranda!	Pablo Utrera	"Faith"	Saved by Miranda!
12	Miranda!	Natalia Nekare	"Lady Marmalade"	Miranda!'s Choice
13	Soledad	Margarita Hegglin	"El amor después del amor"	Eliminated
14	Soledad	Nacho Leguizamón	"Y así, así"	Saved by Soledad
15	Soledad	Iván di Paolo	"Forget You"	Soledad's choice
16	Soledad	Gustavo Corvalán	"Yo no sé mañana"	Public's choice

Non-competition performance

Episode	Order	Artist(s)	Song(s)
19	1	Miguel Bosé	"Aire Soy"

==== Week 2 ====
===== Round 1 (21, 23, & 25 October) =====
The live performances from the first part of the second round, aired on 21 October 2012. The elimination shows were broadcast on 23 and 25 October 2012.

Order	Coach	Artist	Song	Result
1	Axel	Nicolás Sosa	"Invierno"	Public's choice
2	Axel	Georgina Moreiro	"Estoy enamorada"	Eliminated
3	Axel	Silvia Fernández	"Que nadie sepa mi sufrir"	Axel's choice
4	Miranda!	Fernando Pernía	"Feel"	Eliminated
5	Miranda!	Gonzalo Andrada	"What Makes You Beautiful"	Miranda!'s choice
6	Miranda!	Mariano Poblete	"La flor más bella"	Public's choice
7	El Puma	Jordana Battaglia	"Oye"	Public's choice
8	El Puma	Dennis Smith	"Payphone"	Eliminated
9	El Puma	Antonela Cirillo	"Don't Cry for Me Argentina"	El Puma's choice
10	Soledad	Mario Suárez	"Amor de los manzanares"	Public's choice
11	Soledad	Laura Dimonti	"Pa' ti no estoy"	Soledad's choice
12	Soledad	Daniela Mazzitelli	"Part of Me"	Eliminated

Non-competition performances

Episode	Order	Artist(s)	Song(s)
22	1	Team Miranda!	"Carnaval toda la vida"
23	2	Team Soledad	"Si bastasen un par de canciones"

===== Round 2 (28, 30 October & 1 November) =====
The live performances from the second part of the second round, aired on 28 October 2012. The elimination shows were broadcast on 30 October and on 1 November 2012.

Order	Coach	Artist	Song	Result
1	Miranda!	Natalia Nekare	"Inevitable"	Eliminated
2	Miranda!	Miguel Ángel Roda	"Fuimos"	Public's choice
3	Miranda!	Pablo Utrera	"Crazy Little Thing Called Love"	Miranda!'s choice
4	El Puma	Alejandro Serra	"Tu amor"	Public's choice
5	El Puma	José Luis Bartolilla	"Haven't Met You Yet"	El Puma's choice
6	El Puma	Melina Imhoff	"Pupilas lejanas"	Eliminated
7	Soledad	Gustavo Corvalán	"La quiero a morir"	Public's choice
8	Soledad	Nacho Leguizamón	"Bailando con tu sombra"	Eliminated
9	Soledad	Iván di Paolo	"Inolvidable"	Soledad's choice
10	Axel	Mateo Iturbide	"Spaghetti del rock"	Public's choice
11	Axel	María Inés Roller	"(You Make Me Feel Like) A Natural Woman"	Axel's choice
12	Axel	Gonzalo Rodríguez	"Beautiful Girls"	Eliminated

==== Week 3 (4, 6, & 8 November) ====
The live performances for the third week was aired on 4 November 2012. The elimination shows were broadcast on 6 & 8 November 2012.

Order	Coach	Artist	Song	Result
1	Miranda!	Miguel Angel Roda	"No sé tú"	Miranda!'s choice
2	Miranda!	Mariano Poblete	"Kiss"	Public's choice
3	Miranda!	Pablo Utrera	"Angels"	Saved by Miranda!
4	Miranda!	Gonzalo Andrada	"Vuelve"	Eliminated
5	Axel	María Inés Roller	"Mary Poppins y el Deshollinador"	Axel's choice
6	Axel	Mateo Iturbide	"When a Man Loves a Woman"	Public's choice
7	Axel	Silvia Fernández	"El talismán"	Saved by Axel
8	Axel	Nicolás Sosa	"Lo dejaría todo"	Eliminated
9	El Puma	Jordana Battaglia	"Otro amor vendrá"	El Puma's choice
10	El Puma	Alejandro Serra	"Baby, I Love Your Way"	Eliminated
11	El Puma	Antonela Cirillo	"One Moment in Time"	Public's choice
12	El Puma	José Luis Bartolilla	"Pégate"	Saved by El Puma
13	Soledad	Iván di Paolo	"Isn't She Lovely?"	Saved by Soledad
14	Soledad	Mario Suárez	"Entré a mi pago sin golpear"	Eliminated
15	Soledad	Laura Dimonti	"Derroche"	Soledad's choice
16	Soledad	Gustavo Corvalán	"Dígale"	Public's choice

==== Week 4: Quarterfinals (11, 13, & 15 November) ====
The live performances from the Quarterfinals, aired on 11 November 2012. The elimination shows were broadcast on 13 & 15 November 2012.

Order	Coach	Artist	Song	Result
1	Soledad	Laura Dimonti	"América"	Eliminated
2	Soledad	Gustavo Corvalán	"Próvocame"	Soledad's choice
3	Soledad	Iván di Paolo	"Heaven"	Public's choice
4	El Puma	José Luis Bartolilla	"Suspicious Minds"	Public's choice
5	El Puma	Jordana Battaglia	"Total Eclipse of the Heart"	Eliminated
6	El Puma	Antonela Cirillo	"My Heart Will Go On"	El Puma's choice
7	Miranda!	Mariano Poblete	"Perro dinamita"	Miranda!'s choice
8	Miranda!	Miguel Angel Roda	"Naranjo en flor"	Public's choice
9	Miranda!	Pablo Utrera	"Moves like Jagger"	Eliminated
10	Axel	María Inés Roller	"Dulce condena"	Public's choice
11	Axel	Silvia Fernández	"Hoy puede ser un gran día"	Eliminated
12	Axel	Mateo Iturbide	"Ruta 66"	Axel's choice

==== Week 5: Semifinals (18, 22, & 26 November) ====
The live performances for the Semifinals were aired on 18, November 2012. The elimination shows were broadcast on 22 & 26 November 2012.

Coach	Artist	Order	Song	Order	Song	Summary of Points			Result
Coach	Artist	Order	Song	Order	Song	Coach's	Public's	Total	Result
El Puma	José Luis Bartolilla	1	"Más"	3	"I Was Born to Love You"	35	57	92	Eliminated
El Puma	Antonela Cirillo	2	"Let the River Run"	4	"Mi Reflejo"	65	43	108	Safe
Miranda!	Mariano Poblete	3	"Roxanne"	7	"Rock del gato"	50	60	110	Safe
Miranda!	Miguel Angel Roda	4	"Caserón de tejas"	8	"Rock del gato"	50	40	90	Eliminated
Axel	María Inés Roller	5	"I'm Every Woman"	8	"Never Can Say Goodbye"	40	42	82	Eliminated
Axel	Mateo Iturbide	6	"Amor donde quiera que estés"	6	"American Woman"	60	58	118	Safe
Soledad	Gustavo Corvalán	7	"El Amor de Mi Vida"	1	"El tiempo que duró nuestro amor"	55	85	140	Safe
Soledad	Iván di Paolo	8	"Sueños"	2	"Against All Odds"	45	15	60	Eliminated

Non-competition performances

Episode	Order	Artist(s)	Song(s)
33	1	The Final 8	"Puedes Llegar"
33	2	The Final 8	"Color Esperanza"
34	3	The Final 8	"Sea"
35	4	The Final 8	"Mi amor"

==== Week 6: Finals (2 December) ====
The live performances and results for the Finals, aired on 2 December 2012.

Color key

Artist was proclaimed as the winner
Artist ended as the runner-up
Artist ended as the third placer
Artist ended as the fourth placer

Coach	Artist	Solo song		Duet song			Result
Coach	Artist	Order	Song	Order	Song	with	Result
Miranda!	Mariano Poblete	1	"La bifurcada"	8	"Loco un poco"	Miranda!	Runner-up
El Puma	Antonela Cirillo	2	"Flashdance... What a Feeling"	7	"Algo contigo"	El Puma	Third place
Soledad	Gustavo Corvalán	3	"A puro dolor"	5	"Santo Santo"	Soledad	Winner
Axel	Mateo Iturbide	4	"De Música Ligera"	6	"Me siento mucho mejor"	Axel	Fourth place

Non-competition performances

Order	Artist(s)	Song(s)
1	Top 4	"Himno de mi corazón"
2	Coaches	"Don", "Tren del cielo", "Agarrénse de las manos", "Celebra la vida"
