= Perfecta (song) =

2007 single by Miranda! and Julieta Venegas

Single by Miranda! and Julieta Venegas

from the album El Disco de Tu Corazón
- Language: Spanish
- Released: 9 July 2007
- Genre: Synth-pop; reggae; electropop
- Length: 3:45
- Label: Pelo Music
- Songwriter: Alejandro Sergi
- Producer: Cachorro López

Miranda! singles chronology
"Prisionero" (2007)	"Perfecta" (2007)	"Enamorada" (2007)

Julieta Venegas singles chronology
"Primer día" (2007)	"Perfecta" (2007)	"Mi principio" (2008)

Music video
- "Perfecta" (Juliana Gattas version) on YouTube

"Perfecta" (Perfect) is a song by Argentine band Miranda! and Mexican singer-songwriter Julieta Venegas. It was released on July 9, 2007, through Pelo Music as the second single from the band's third studio album, El Disco de Tu Corazón. A special version without Venegas, with vocals from Miranda! singer Juliana Gattas, was released for the band's first compilation album, El Templo Del Pop, on April 1, 2008.

The song reached the top three in Argentina, Colombia and Mexico, and charted inside the top thirty in Chile and Peru.

== Background ==
"Perfecta" is a reggae song with mixes of electropop. Its lyrics were described as "catchy".

A more "danceable and Latino" remix titled "Perfecta (Cumbow Remix)" was released months after the song's original release, which incorporated production by Mexican group Sonidero Nacional. Pablo Lescano, a member of the cumbia group Damas Gratis, provides additional keyboards on the song. The remix was included in the band's third live album titled El Disco de Tu Corazón - En Vivo, released on June 5, 2007.

== Charts ==
Chart (2007–08)	Peak position
Argentina (CAPIF)	3
Chile (America Top 100)	20
Colombia (America Top 100)	2
Mexico (America Top 100)	3
Peru (America Top 100)	26

== "Perfecta (Versión 2023)" ==
"Perfecta (Versión 2023)"

Single by Miranda!, María Becerra and FMK

from the album Hotel Miranda!
- Language: Spanish
- Released: 18 April 2023
- Length: 3:41
- Label: Sony Argentina
- Songwriters: Alejandro Sergi; María Becerra; FMK
- Producer: Big One

Miranda! singles chronology
"Prisionero" (2023)	"Perfecta (Versión 2023)" (2023)

María Becerra singles chronology
"Adiós" (2023)	"Perfecta (Versión 2023)" (2023)	"Te Cura" (2023)

FMK singles chronology
"Un Finde" (2023)	"Perfecta (Versión 2023)" (2023)	"Poka Luz (Remix)" (2023)

Music video
- "Perfecta" (Versión 2023) on YouTube

"Perfecta (Versión 2023)", also known as "Perfecta", is a song by Argentine band Miranda! in collaboration with Argentine singers-songwriters María Becerra and FMK. It was released on April 18, 2023, through Sony Music Argentina, as the sixth and final single from the band's first remix album Hotel Miranda!, in which they remade old songs from albums such as El Disco de Tu Corazón, with new productions and in collaboration with different singers, producers and writers.

The track was fully produced by Big One, a frequent collaborator of Becerra who produced the majority of her debut studio album Animal.

=== Music video ===
The music video of the song follows the "hotel" theme that all songs on the album have. In this one, the invited artists, Becerra and FMK, play two landscapers who work in the park of the fictitious hotel. It is inspired by Alice in Wonderland, Becerra appears as the cat in the film, while Juliana Gattas plays the protagonist, with a blue dress and blonde hair.

=== Accolades ===
Year	Ceremony	Category	Result	Ref.
2024	Premios Gardel	Best Collaboration	Pending	
2024	Premios Gardel	Best Pop Song	Pending	

=== Commercial performance ===
The song debuted at number 45 on the Billboard Argentina Hot 100 in the tracking week of April 29, 2023. In its second week, it rose thirty-seven spots to number 8, being the highest-rising song of the week. A week later, it reached its peak at number 6. It is the band's song that has reached the highest on the chart since its creation in 2018, surpassing "Uno los Dos" with Emilia (2023), which peaked at number 15. "Perfecta" charted in five Latin American countries in addition to Argentina, these being Ecuador, Mexico, Nicaragua, Paraguay, Peru and Uruguay, where it reached the top 20 on the Monitor Latino charts.

=== Charts ===
Chart (2023)	Peak position
Argentina Hot 100 (Billboard)	6
Argentina Airplay (Monitor Latino)	4
Argentina National Airplay (Monitor Latino)	2
Ecuador Pop (Monitor Latino)	7
Mexico (Monitor Latino)	17
Nicaragua Pop (Monitor Latino)	14
Paraguay (Monitor Latino)	12
Paraguay (SGP)	28
Perú Pop (Monitor Latino)	7
Uruguay (Monitor Latino)	14
Uruguay (CUD)	18

== See also ==
- List of Billboard Argentina Hot 100 top-ten singles in 2023
