= Fuerte (album) =

Studio album by Miranda!
- Released: April 21, 2017
- Recorded: 2016–2017
- Studio: Mondomix (Buenos Aires); Fantasma (Buenos Aires)
- Genre: Electropop; latin pop
- Length: 40:43
- Language: Spanish
- Label: Sony Music
- Producer: Alejandro Sergi; Cachorro López

Miranda! chronology
Safari (2014)	Fuerte (2017)	Souvenir (2021)

Singles from Fuerte
- 1. "743" Released: November 11, 2016; 2. "Quiero Vivir A Tu Lado" Released: January 24, 2017; 3. "En Esta Noche" Released: May 26, 2017; 4. "Enero" Released: October 11, 2017; 5. "Cálido y Rojo" Released: November 24, 2017; 6. "Tu Padre" Released: June 7, 2018

Fuerte (lit. 'Strong') is the seventh studio album by Argentine band Miranda!, released on April 21, 2017, through Sony Music, the band's first record with the label, after leaving Pelo Music in 2016. It was entirely produced and written by Alejandro Sergi and Cachorro López. Guest vocals include Uruguayan Natalia Oreiro and Mexican Jesús Navarro, part of the band Reik.

== Background and release ==
The creation of the album began in 2016, while the band's second compilation album, El Templo del Pop, Vol. 2, was being released, after leaving Pelo Music and signing with the Sony Music label.

"743" was released as the lead single on November 11, 2016. The second single, "Quiero Vivir A Tu Lado", released on January 24, 2017, was composed to be the theme song for the series of the same name, starring Mike Amigorena, Paola Krum, Florencia Peña and Alberto Ajaka.

In 2017 "En Esta Noche", "Enero" and "Cálido y Rojo" were released as singles. The latter had a remix released in 2020 together with the Argentine singer Benjamín Amadeo. "Tu Padre" was released as the last single on June 7, 2018.

== Lyrics and composition ==
Fuerte is primarily a pop record, with elements from various musical styles, such as electropop, synth-pop, Argentine rock, funk and disco. Alejandro Sergi described it as a more relaxed dance album, compared to the band's previous ones, such as El Disco de Tu Corazón and Miranda Es Imposible!.

== Accolades ==
Year	Ceremony	Category	Result	Ref.
2017	Premios Gardel	Best Pop Group Album	Won	
2017	Premios Gardel	Best Cover Design	Nominated	

== Track listing ==
All songs written and produced by Alejandro Sergi and Cachorro López, except where noted.

Fuerte track listing
No.	Title	Writer(s)	Length
1.	"743"		3:26
2.	"Cálido y Rojo"		3:29
3.	"Lejos De Mi Alcance"	Sergi	3:06
4.	"No"		4:08
5.	"Ahora Que Soy Cantante"	Sergi	3:03
6.	"Amante Amigo"		3:49
7.	"Enero" (featuring Jesús Navarro)		3:33
8.	"En Esta Noche"	Sergi	2:52
9.	"Tu Hombre" (featuring Natalia Oreiro)	Sergi	3:08
10.	"Tu Padre"		3:07
11.	"Quiero Vivir A Tu Lado"	Sergi; López; Paul Kirzner	3:16
12.	"Mala Señal"	Sergi	3:40
Total length:			40:43

== Credits and personnel ==
Adapted from the album liner notes.

- Alejandro Sergi – lead vocals, production, composition, keyboards, guitar, programming
- Juliana Gattas – lead vocals
- Cachorro López – bass (1, 5, 6), keyboards (1, 2, 4, 5, 6, 10, 11), programming (1, 2, 4, 5, 6, 10, 11)
- Natalia Oreiro – lead vocals (9)
- Jesús Navarro – lead vocals (7).
- Sebastián Schon – programming (1, 2, 4, 6, 7, 10, 11, 12), sax (10)
- Gabriel Lucena – keyboards (2, 3), programming (2, 3), guitar (2), bass (3)
- Anuk Sforza – guitar (2, 3, 7, 11, 12)
- Ludo Morell – drums (2, 3, 11, 12)
- Demián Nava – keyboards (1, 4, 10), programming (1, 4, 10)
- Didi Gutman – keyboards (4, 7)
- Nicolás Grimaldi – bass (7, 11, 12), locution (1)
- Demir Lulja – violin (7)
- César Sogbe – mixing
- Brad Blackwood – mastering
