= Alejandro Sergi =

Argentine singer, songwriter and producer

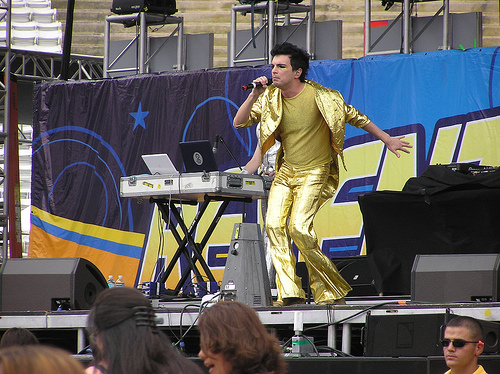
- Sergi in 2006
- Born: Alejandro Gustavo Sergi Galante; October 5, 1971 (age 55); Haedo, Buenos Aires, Argentina
- Occupations: Singer; songwriter; producer
- Years active: 1986–present
- Musical career
- Genres: Pop; electropop; pop rock; synth-pop
- Instruments: Vocals; guitar; keyboards
- Labels: Pelo Music; Sony Music
- Member of: Miranda!; Meteoros; Satélite 23

Alejandro Gustavo Sergi Galante (born October 5, 1971) is an Argentine singer, songwriter, and producer. He rose to fame as a member of the electropop band Miranda!, alongside Juliana Gattas. He was also part of the band Mama Vaca between 1995 and 1997, and is currently a vocalist for Meteoros and Satélite 23.

== Early life ==
Alejandro Gustavo Sergi Galante was born in Haedo, Buenos Aires, Argentina, on October 5, 1971. His father was a lawyer while his mother was a piano teacher. His taste for music began when he was little, after his parents gave him his first guitar when he was in kindergarten.

Once he finished high school, he began his work stage in a cookie company. Sergi ended up resigning, and decided to focus on finding an occupation more focused on the artistic field. That's how he got a job as sound manager for The Beatles tribute group called The Beats. Later he got jobs in his same function in a company of artistic events and in political acts, in addition to participating in electronic parties in various dance centers. He was even a sound engineer for the voiceovers of Argentine presidents Raúl Alfonsín, Carlos Menem and Fernando de la Rúa.

== Career ==
In the early 1990s, he started out as a guitarist for a funk group known as Mama Vaca. He began to venture into singing, being the leading voice in several of the group's songs with great approval from the public. Mama Vaca recorded two albums, Hombre Verde (1995) and Mama Vaca (1997), and ended up dissolving by decision of its members. After that, Sergi dedicated himself exclusively to being a sound engineer for musical events and a recording technician for bands.

Sergi with musicians Gori Leva and Juliana Gattas formed a trio called Los 3 Lirios, where Leva and Sergi were programmers and Gattas the singer, reversing jazz songs in an electronic style. For their presentations, which were held at Cemento, Sergi wrote the first song called "Imán", and received positive reviews, including from guitarist Leandro Fuentes. Months later, they formed the band. In 2001, Sergi teamed up with Gattas, Fuentes and Bruno de Vincenti to form Miranda!, labeling their style as melodramatic electropop. Named after Argentinian actor Osvaldo Miranda, the group finally met the actor in December 2002 during the Buen Dia Arriba Festival in Palermo.

The group's first two studio albums, Es Mentira and Sin Restricciones were released independently by Secsy Discos. The last one was the one that brought the band to fame, being certified Platinum in Argentina, Colombia and Mexico. The band gained popularity in Latin American countries and Spain. Several songs, such as "Don" and "Yo Te Diré" were successful and Sergi stood out "for his voice and appearance."

After signing with Pelo Music in 2005, the band released the albums El Disco de Tu Corazón (2007) and Miranda Es Imposible! (2009). The former topped the Argentine chart and was nominated for the Latin Grammy Awards for Best Pop Album by a Duo or Group with Vocal. Sergi was nominated for the Fashionista Award — Male category at the 2008 MTV Video Music Awards Latinoamérica.

In 2010, Sergi got the role of Salvador in the movie Miss Tacuarembó, starring Natalia Oreiro. He was also in charge of the soundtrack. Miranda's album Magistral was released in 2011. The following year, Sergi participated in the film Las mariposas de Sadourní as the doctor. He was also a judge with Juliana Gattas for the first season of La Voz Argentina. In the same year, he released the album Choque with Marcelo Moura, with the name Moura Sergi.

In 2013, he was a substitute judge of Tu cara me suena replacing Cacho Castaña, in addition to playing himself in the television series Wake Up with No Make Up. In 2014 the album Safari by Miranda! was released, which included the singles "Extraño", "Fantasmas" and "Nadie como tú". The following year, he was a judge in the television show Elegidos, la música en tus manos, with Gattas.

Between 2015 and 2016 Sergi formed two new bands: Meteoros, together with Julieta Venegas, Cachorro López and Didi Gutman, and Satélite 23, together with Diego Poso and Gabriel Lucena. Both bands' self-titled albums were released in 2015 and 2017 respectively. Fuerte, Miranda's seventh album, was released in 2017 after signing with Sony Music. That same year, Sergi plays himself in the film Mario On Tour. In 2018 he played Carlos Gardel in the film Pasado de Copas: Drunk History.

In 2019 he was invited to participate in the production of the album Grandes Éxitos by the bizarre metal band, Aspera. That same year he participated in the album Lynch Rompecabezas with Valeria Lynch singing the song "Me Das Cada Día Más". In 2021, Miranda's album titled Souvenir is released, which was postponed due to the COVID-19 pandemic.

== Influences ==
Sergi has named The Cure and Prince as two artists that he liked a lot in his teens. Asked why he used falsetto to sing, Sergi said that "I basically do it because when I started singing I liked a lot of music that used it. In fact, my favorite artist is Prince and he uses falsetto a lot." He also named Michael Jackson, the Bee Gees, the Beach Boys and Sui Generis as influences for his falsetto.

He praised the band Virus, highlighting that it was "unclassifiable", with pop songs, disco and a deep imagery. Regarding his time in the band Mama Vaca, where they mixed punk, reggae and hardcore, Sergi mentioned Mano Negra and Los Fabulosos Cadillacs as his main influences.

In an interview in 2014, the Miranda! singers stated that "in our DNA there is Cerati and Pimpinela", highlighting the perfectionism in Cerati's sound and the duo's theatricality and dramatic lyrics. He also mentioned Madonna and Michael Jackson as the band's biggest influences. They have also mentioned that many of their biggest influences within pop come from Spain, such as Fangoria, La Casa Azul and La Buena Vida.

Asked about DJs, he named Richie Hawtin, Carl Cox, The Blessed Madonna and Pareja DJs. He has also cited some Disco Music groups from the 70s such as Boney M. among others.

== Discography ==
with Mama Vaca

- Hombre Verde (1995)
- Mama Vaca (1997)

with Miranda!

- Es Mentira (2002)
- Sin Restricciones (2004)
- El Disco de Tu Corazón (2007)
- Miranda Es Imposible! (2009)
- Magistral (2011)
- Safari (2014)
- Fuerte (2017)
- Souvenir (2021)

with Meteoros

- Meteoros (2015)
- Meteoros+ (2019)

with Satélite 23

- Satélite 23 (2017)

== Filmography ==
=== Film ===
Year	Title	Role
2010	Miss Tacuarembó	Salvador
2012	Las mariposas de Sadourní	Doctor Seamonkey
2017	Mario On Tour	Himself

=== Television ===
Year	Title	Role	Notes
2012	La Voz Argentina	Judge / Mentor	Season 1, with Juliana Gattas
2013	Tu cara me suena	Replacement judge	Season 1, 4 episodes
2013	Wake Up with No Make Up	Himself	Television series
2015	Elegidos, la música en tus manos	Judge	With Juliana Gattas
2018	Pasado de Copas: Drunk History	Carlos Gardel	Television miniseries

== Awards and nominations ==
Year	Award	Category	Nominee	Result
2008	MTV Video Music Awards Latinoamérica	Fashionista Award — Male	Himself	Nominated
