= Magistral (album) =

2011 studio album by Miranda!

Studio album by Miranda!
- Released: September 9, 2011
- Recorded: 2010 – 2011
- Genre: synth-pop
- Length: 31:42
- Language: Spanish
- Label: Pelo Music; Sony Music (2016 reissue)
- Producer: Cachorro López

Miranda! chronology
Miranda Es Imposible! (2009)	Magistral (2011)	Safari (2014)

Singles from Magistral
- 1. "Ritmo y Decepción" Released: October 29, 2010; 2. "Ya Lo Sabía" Released: March 14, 2011; 3. "Dice Lo Que Siente" Released: May 11, 2012; 4. "Puro Talento" Released: August 9, 2012

Magistral is the fifth studio album by Argentine band Miranda!. It was released on September 9, 2011, by Pelo Music.

== Critical reception ==
Professional ratings
Review scores
Source	Rating
AllMusic	3.5/5 stars

In a review for AllMusic, Mariano Prunes describes the album as "a sort of return to their roots by a band that was once truly original", but whose "unexpected international success has been unequivocally steering them in the direction of generic Latin pop". At the end of the review, Prunes commented: "In brief, Magistral is a good Miranda! album, not as inspired or creative as their first two efforts, but it is less uneven and less vapid than El Disco de Tu Corazón or Miranda Es Imposible!, but it is an effort that will ultimately neither add nor subtract much from their discography".

=== Accolades ===
Year	Ceremony	Category	Result	Ref.
2012	Premios Gardel	Best Pop Group Album	Won	
2012	Premios Gardel	Best Cover Design	Nominated	
2012	Premios Gardel	Best Recording Engineering	Nominated	
2012	Premios Gardel	Best Production	Nominated	
2012	Premios Gardel	Album Of The Year	Nominated	

== Track listing ==
All songs were produced by Cachorro López and written by Alejandro Sergi, except where noted.

Magistral standard edition
No.	Title	Writer(s)	Length
1.	"Dice Lo Que Siente"	Alejandro Sergi; Cachorro López; Juliana Gattas	3:27
2.	"Ya Lo Sabía"	Sergi; Gattas	2:58
3.	"A La Distancia"		3:31
4.	"Ritmo y Decepción"		3:23
5.	"10 Años Después"		3:06
6.	"No Pero No"		3:21
7.	"Cada Vez Que Decimos Adiós"		3:19
8.	"Una Noche Como Hoy"		3:32
9.	"Tucán" (featuring Emmanuel Horvilleur)	Sergi; Emmanuel Horvilleur	3:10
10.	"Puro Talento"	Sergi; Gattas	3:24
Total length:			31:42

Magistral deluxe edition
No.	Title	Writer(s)	Length
11.	"Ritmo y Decepción" (Remix)		4:04
12.	"Dice Lo Que Siente" (Remix)	Sergi; López; Gattas	3:31
13.	"Ritmo y Decepción" (Instrumental)		2:43
Total length:			43:36

== Charts ==
Chart performance for Magistral
Chart (2011)	Peak position
Mexican Albums (AMOPROFON)	92
Spanish Albums (PROMUSICAE)	90
