= Safari (Miranda! album) =

Studio album by Miranda!
- Released: July 22, 2014
- Recorded: 2013–2014
- Studio: Mondomix (Buenos Aires); Fantasma (Buenos Aires)
- Genre: Pop rock; electropop
- Language: Spanish
- Label: Pelo Music; Sony Music (2016 reissue)
- Producer: Alejandro Sergi; Cachorro López

Miranda! chronology
Magistral (2011)	Safari (2014)	Fuerte (2017)

Singles from Safari
- 1. "Extraño" Released: December 28, 2013; 2. "Fantasmas" Released: June 16, 2014; 3. "Nadie Como Tú" Released: July 3, 2015

Safari (also titled SAFAR!) is the sixth studio album by Argentine band Miranda!. It was released on July 22, 2014, by Pelo Music, and was their final album with the label; before signing with Sony Music in 2016.

Three singles were released from the album, "Extraño", "Fantasmas", and "Nadie Como Tú". Safari was the band's second album to chart in Spain, after Magistral, where it reached number 96.

== Background and release ==
The group started working on the album in 2013. At the end of the year, they announced the premiere of the single "Extraño", which was officially released on December 28. It was described as "a journey into the heart and guts of the electro pop". At the single's premiere, the promotion of Safari began, with the title of "new album", scheduled to be released in May 2014. The name of the album was kept secret until hours before the release.

"Fantasmas" was released as the second single on June 16, 2014. For the first time in their career, the band incorporated a cover on an album; "Miro La Vida Pasar", featuring Fangoria, the original artists.

== Critical reception ==
Professional ratings
Review scores
Source	Rating
AllMusic	3.5/5 stars

In a press release, a Warner Music Argentina collaborator described the album as "ten new songs to dance to, fall in love with, miss, get excited about, all that range of sensations to which Miranda has accustomed his audience." He also highlighted the track "Miro la vida pasar", featuring Fangoria, and the composition by Alaska, Nacho Canut, Mario Canut, Fernando Delgado and Pablo Sycet. Nicolás Miguelez for Zona de Obras said that Safari is an "instant classic", with a sound that is "purely pop, almost a tribute to the 80s and its culture of exaggeration." He also praised the "gripping and provocative" lyrics and vocals.

In a mixed review, Lorenzo Conchas for Bandwagon wrote that Safari is "a good album and nothing more", and that it "doesn't give the drama that is needed". Pablo Plotkin for La Nación, praised "the quality of Alejandro Sergi as a songwriter, and the exceptional level of him and Juliana Gattas as singers", and the "guitar and voice melodies".

=== Accolades ===
Year	Ceremony	Category	Result	Ref.
2015	Premios Gardel	Album of the Year	Nominated	
2015	Premios Gardel	Best Pop Group Album	Won	

== Track listing ==
All songs were produced by Alejandro Sergi and Cachorro López.

Safari standard edition
No.	Title	Writer(s)	Length
1.	"Fantasmas"	Alejandro Sergi; Sebastián Schon	3:34
2.	"Extraño"	Sergi	3:56
3.	"Es Por Él"	Sergi; Schon	2:56
4.	"Solo Lo Sabe La Luna"	Sergi	3:30
5.	"Miro La Vida Pasar" (featuring Fangoria)	Alaska; Nacho Canut; Mauro Canut; Fernando Delgado; Pablo Sycet	3:33
6.	"Se Mía"	Sergi; Juliana Gattas	3:06
7.	"Buen Día"	Sergi; Gattas	2:51
8.	"Nadie Como Tú"	Sergi	3:25
9.	"Fotos"	Sergi; Gattas	3:29
10.	"Para Olvidar Tu Amor"	Sergi	3:23

Safari digital edition
No.	Title	Writer(s)	Length
11.	"Fantasmas" (acoustic version)	Sergi; Schon	3:42
12.	"Extraño" (acoustic version)	Sergi	3:52
13.	"Es Por Él" (acoustic version)	Sergi; Schon	2:53
14.	"Solo Lo Sabe La Luna" (acoustic version)	Sergi	3:24
15.	"Miro La Vida Pasar" (featuring Fangoria, acoustic version)	Alaska; Nacho Canut; Mauro Canut; Delgado; Sycet	3:32
16.	"Se Mía" (acoustic version)	Sergi; Gattas	3:08
17.	"Buen Día" (acoustic version)	Sergi; Gattas	2:13
18.	"Nadie Como Tú" (acoustic version)	Sergi	3:05
19.	"Fotos" (acoustic version)	Sergi; Gattas	2:34
20.	"Para Olvidar Tu Amor" (acoustic version)	Sergi	2:55

== Credits and personnel ==
Adapted from the album liner notes.

- Alejandro Sergi – lead vocals, composition (1, 2, 3, 4, 6, 7, 8, 9, 10), production
- Juliana Gattas – lead vocals, composition (6, 7, 9)
- Cachorro López – production, programming, bass (1), guitar (3)
- Alaska – lead vocals (5), composition (5)
- Nacho Canut – bass (5), composition (5)
- Sebastián Schon – composition (1, 3), keyboards (1, 3), guitar, programming (3)
- Mauro Canut – composition (5)
- Fernando Delgado Espeja – composition (5)
- Pablo Sycet – composition (5)
- Gabriel Lucena – drums, guitar, keyboards, programming
- Ludo Morell – drums
- Anuk Sforza – guitar (3, 4, 10)
- César Sogbe – mixing
- José Blanco – mastering

== Charts ==
Chart performance for Safari
Chart (2014)	Peak position
Spanish Albums (PROMUSICAE)	96
