= Souvenir (Miranda! album) =

Studio album by Miranda!
- Released: May 7, 2021
- Recorded: 2019–2021
- Studio: Mondomix (Buenos Aires); Fantasma (Buenos Aires)
- Genre: Latin pop; electropop; house music
- Length: 33:41
- Language: Spanish
- Label: Sony Music
- Producer: Alejandro Sergi; Cachorro López; Gabriel Lucena

Miranda! chronology
Fuerte (2017)	Souvenir (2021)	Hotel Miranda! (2023)

Singles from Souvenir
- 1. "Me Gustas Tanto" Released: July 12, 2019; 2. "Un Tiempo" Released: December 29, 2019; 3. "Casi Feliz" Released: May 1, 2020; 4. "Luna De Papel" Released: August 26, 2020; 5. "Entre Las Dos" Released: November 20, 2020; 6. "Por Amar Al Amor" Released: March 19, 2021

Souvenir is the eighth studio album by Argentine band Miranda!. Originally planned to be released in 2020 and postponed due to the COVID-19 pandemic, it was released on May 7, 2021, by Sony Music. The album was primarily written and produced by Alejandro Sergi and Cachorro López, with further collaboration with Gabriel Lucena. Guest vocals include Spanish band Sidonie and Chilean musician Javiera Mena.

Six singles were released from the album: "Me Gustas Tanto", "Un Tiempo", "Casi Feliz", "Luna De Papel", "Entre Las Dos", and "Por Amar Al Amor".

== Background and release ==
Months after the release of the band's seventh album, Fuerte (2017), they began working on new songs. "Me Gustas Tanto" and "Un Tiempo" were released as singles in July and December 2019 respectively. The as-yet-unnamed album was initially slated for a mid-2020 release, but after the arrival of the COVID-19 pandemic in Argentina, it ended up being postponed to next year, 2021.

On May 1, 2020, the song "Casi Feliz" was released, which was composed to be the theme song for the Netflix series of the same name, starring Sebastián Wainraich and Natalie Pérez. The songs "Luna De Papel" and "Entre Las Dos" were released in August and December of that same year respectively.

"Por Amar Al Amor" was released as the sixth and last single of the album on March 19, 2021. The release date of Souvenir along with its cover art, was announced on April 28, 2021. For the release of the album, an audiovisual showcase was also shared via streaming, in which they presented four songs from the album in a unique format: "Por Amar Al Amor", "Caía La Noche", "Que No Pare" and "Me Gustas Mucho".

== Lyrics and composition ==
Souvenir is primarily a pop and electropop record, with elements from various musical styles, such as house, dancehall, disco, synth-pop and dub. Through a press release, the singer Alejandro Sergi defined Souvenir as "the beginning of Miranda!'s third life". About the album, he commented that "it is not a return to the beginnings of the band", but a "review of their entire career", where they sought to "do what they always have, but better". He added that it is basically instrumented with machines and software, a few acoustic drums and guitars, "the rest is pure synth, sampling and digital processes". As for the lyrics, the album covers the usual themes, but from a more reflective and less impulsive point of view.

== Critical reception ==
Shangay's writer Agustín Gómez Cascales praised Souvenir for "its luminosity" and for "the strength of its choruses", and described it as a "new delivery of bubbly and exquisite pop". He gave the album 4 stars out of 5.

=== Accolades ===
Year	Ceremony	Category	Result	Ref.
2022	Premios Gardel	Best Pop Group Album	Won	

== Track listing ==
Souvenir track listing
No.	Title	Writer(s)	Producer(s)	Length
1.	"Por Amar Al Amor"	Alejandro Sergi; Cachorro López	Sergi; López	3:48
2.	"Caía La Noche"	Sergi; López; Juliana Gattas	Sergi; López	3:11
3.	"Me Gustas Tanto" (featuring Sidonie)	Sergi	Sergi; López	3:40
4.	"Entre Las Dos" (featuring Javiera Mena)	Sergi; Javiera Mena; Gattas	Sergi; López	3:25
5.	"Luna De Papel"	Sergi; López	Sergi; López	3:29
6.	"No Es Lo Que Parece"	Sergi; López; Gattas	Sergi; López	3:25
7.	"Un Tiempo"	Sergi	Sergi; López	3:15
8.	"En El Bar"	Sergi	Sergi; López	3:42
9.	"Que No Pare"	Sergi; López; Gabriel Lucena; Gattas	Sergi; López; Lucena	2:57
10.	"Casi Feliz"	Sergi	Sergi	2:45
Total length:				33:41

== Credits and personnel ==
Adapted from the album liner notes.

- Alejandro Sergi – lead vocals, production, composition, keyboards, guitar, programming
- Juliana Gattas – lead vocals, composition (2, 4, 6, 9)
- Sindonie – lead vocals (3)
- Javiera Mena – lead vocals (4), programming (4), composition (4)
- Gabriel Lucena – bass (4), programming (9), keyboard (9), composition (9), production (9)
- Ludo Morrel – drums (10)
- Cachorro López – programming (1, 2, 4, 5, 6, 8, 9), keyboards (1, 2, 4, 5, 6, 8, 9), production
- Sebastián Schon – programming (2, 4, 6, 7), keyboards (2, 4, 6, 7)
- Demian Nava – programming (1, 2, 4, 5, 6, 9), keyboards (1, 2, 4, 5, 6, 9)
- César Sogbe – mixing
- Brad Blackwood – mastering
- Alejandro Ros – graphic design
