= Elegidos, la música en tus manos =

- Genre: Talent show
- Created by: Keshet Broadcasting
- Developed by: Screenz Cross Media LTD
- Presented by: Marley Wiebe; Antonela Cirillo
- Judges: Axel; Soledad Pastorutti; Puma Rodríguez; Miranda!
- Country of origin: Argentina
- Original language: Spanish
- No. of seasons: 2

Production
- Production locations: Buenos Aires, Argentina
- Running time: 120 min.

Original release
- Network: Telefe
- Release: 14 April – 15 December 2015

Related
- Rising Star; HaKokhav HaBa

Elegidos, la música en tus manos is an Argentine reality television singing competition that began airing on Telefe on April 14, 2015. It is based on the Israeli singing competition HaKokhav HaBa (meaning "The Next Star") made by Keshet Broadcasting Ltd. The program format let viewers vote for contestants via mobile apps. It was filmed live in Buenos Aires.

The celebrities working as experts for the show were the same coaching line up from the Argentine version of The Voice: Axel, Soledad Pastorutti, Puma Rodríguez and the duet Miranda!. The presenter, Marley, was also the same, accompanied by La Voz... Argentina third-placed finalist Antonela Cirillo, who worked as a social media correspondent.

== Format ==
=== Auditions ===
In contrast to other singing competition TV shows which feature a cast of celebrity judges, Elegidos: La música en tu manos features a cast of celebrity experts and considers the viewers at home the judges.

During the first stage of the competition, each contestant is asked to perform a well-known song in front of the judges in an audition room. After the song a vote is taken among judges whether to transfer the applicant to the next stage facing the audience at home. If the judges are not sure about how to vote, the contestant is required to perform another song, and then a decision is made.

During each performance in the next stage, the audience at home is able to decide in real time whether or not a contestant is sent through to the next round by using a mobile voting app. In this stage, every contestant performs facing a wall that is down. During the performance, viewers at home and the judges have their times to vote. If the contestant reach 70% of the total votes, the wall raises up meaning the contestant advanced. If the contestant don't reach that percentage, it means the instant elimination.

While the viewers at home are considered the "judges", the expert panelists also influence the vote. During this stage's shows, a yes vote from one of the judges added 7% to the performers total.

=== Duels ===
Contestants who make it through the auditions are paired by the judges to face off in a duel. The first contestant to sing, chosen by a coin toss before the show, sings with the wall up and sets the benchmark for the second contestant. The second contestant sings with the wall down. If the second contestant betters the first contestant's vote total, the wall rises and the second contestant is through to the next round while the first contestant is eliminated; if the second contestant fails to raise the wall, the second contestant is eliminated and the first contestant is through.

=== The Round of Thirteen ===
After the duel rounds end, 13 of the contestants that survived perform. The first 7 contestants perform with the wall up, after which the contestant with the lowest vote total is placed in the hot seat. The subsequent contestants perform with the wall down, and they have to better the vote total of the contestant in the hot seat to raise the wall. If they succeed in doing so, the contestant in the hot seat is eliminated, the contestant with the next lowest vote total is placed in the hot seat, and the performing contestant is provisionally qualified; otherwise, the performing contestant is eliminated if they fail to raise the wall. This continues until the six contestants with the lowest number of votes are eliminated. In addition, the eliminated contestant with the highest number votes in each episode is given a save and is through the next round. In this stage, each panelist's vote counts as 5%.

=== Quarterfinals & Semifinals ===
The quarterfinals and semifinals follow the same format as the Round of Thirteen, except with a few changes to the weightage of the panelists' votes and number of contestants. In the quarterfinals, eight contestants battle for six spots, and each panelist's vote counts as 3%. In the semifinals, six contestants battle for four spots, and each panelist's vote counts as 1%.

=== Finale ===
During the finale, contestants are paired into a duel. The first contestant sings with the wall up and sets the benchmarks for the second contestant. The second contestant sings with the wall down. If the second contestant gets the higher percentage of votes, then the wall rises and the second contestant moves onto the next round of duels. However, if the second contestant's percentage is lower than the first contestant's, the wall stays down and the contestant is eliminated. In the second round, the two contestants that moved on will duel against each other with their second song. The same process applies for this round, except the running vote total is not revealed and both contestants sing with the wall up. The contestant with the higher vote percentage becomes the winner of Elegidos: La música en tus manos. The experts' yes vote counts as a home vote as they vote with their phones; their choices are not revealed to both the performers and the audience.

== Season 1 (2015) ==
=== Auditions ===
==== Episode 1 ====
April 14, 2015

Order	Artist	Song	Total percentage	Experts' choices			
Order	Artist	Song	Total percentage	Miranda!	El Puma	Soledad	Axel
1	Malen Panicchelli	"I Have Nothing"	89%	✔	✔	✔	✔
2	Francisco Silva	"When I Was Your Man"	84%	✔	✔	✔	✔
3	Andrea Aranda Bueno	"Falsas Esperanzas"	43%	✗	✗	✔	✗
4	Luis Alberto Erneta	"Bienvenidos al tren"	79%	✔	✗	✔	✔
5	Brenda Roda	"Lloran las rosas"	33%	✗	✗	✗	✗
6	Matías Carrica	"Buscavida"	95%	✔	✔	✔	✔
7	Jonathan Frutos & Melanie Vargas	"Dónde está el amor"	32%	✗	✗	✗	✗
8	Leandro Chavarria	"Chacarera del triste"	93%	✔	✔	✔	✔
9	Candelaria Buasso	"If I Ain't Got You"	94%	✔	✔	✔	✔

==== Episode 2 ====
April 16, 2015

Order	Artist	Song	Total percentage	Experts' choices			
Order	Artist	Song	Total percentage	Miranda!	El Puma	Soledad	Axel
1	Diana Amarilla	"Hoy"	90%	✔	✔	✔	✔
2	Franco Lionti	"Bailando"	40%	✔	✗	✗	✗
3	Sofía D'Estefano	"What's Up?"	92%	✔	✔	✔	✔
4	Alejandra Palermo	"Tinta roja"	88%	✔	✔	✔	✔
5	Juan García Susini	"Come Fly with Me"	94%	✔	✔	✔	✔
6	Francisco Garay	"Tanto amor"	64%	✗	✗	✗	✔
7	Sachi Iwasa	"Algo mas"	48%	✗	✗	✗	✗
8	Ignacio Mintz	"Con te partirò "	60%	✗	✔	✗	✗
9	Mariana Scotti	"After You've Gone"	87%	✔	✔	✔	✔

==== Episode 3 ====
April 21, 2015

Order	Artist	Song	Total percentage	Experts' choices			
Order	Artist	Song	Total percentage	Miranda!	El Puma	Soledad	Axel
1	Walter Avaca	"Locked Out of Heaven"	81%	✔	✔	✔	✔
2	Rosario Pomillo	"Si te vas"	49%	✗	✗	✗	✗
3	Luciano Ciganda	"Si tú no estás aqui"	88%	✔	✔	✔	✔
4	Pilar Noguera	"Oye"'	93%	✔	✔	✔	✔
5	Ricardo Maulión	"Gigolo"	95%	✔	✔	✔	✔
6	Natalia Martínez	"Qué ganas de no verte nunca más"	92%	✔	✔	✔	✔
7	Daiana Colamarino	"Juana Azurduy"	91%	✔	✔	✔	✔
8	Lucía Miri Echavarría	"Oh! Darling"	37%	✗	✗	✗	✗
9	Alan Madanes	"Moves like Jagger"	79%	✔	✔	✔	✔

==== Episode 4 ====
April 23, 2015

Order	Artist	Song	Total percentage	Experts' choices			
Order	Artist	Song	Total percentage	Miranda!	El Puma	Soledad	Kike*
1	Ching Hui Hsu	"Corazón mentiroso"	42%	✗	✗	✗	✗
2	Clara Newland	"Libre soy"	66%	✗	✔	✗	✔
3	Santiago Vega Olmos	"Ya no hay forma de pedir perdón"	95%	✔	✔	✔	✔
4	Mariano Zito	"Celebra la vida"	41%	✗	✔	✗	✗
5	Stefania Ribisich	"I Wanna Dance with Somebody (Who Loves Me)"	85%	✔	✔	✔	✔
6	Cristian Galván	"Vivir así es morir de amor"	96%	✔	✔	✔	✔
7	Melanie & Ailin Agostini	"I Say a Little Prayer"	90%	✔	✔	✔	✔
8	Sebastián Villalba	"Part-Time Lover"	95%	✔	✔	✔	✔
9	Victoria Bernardi	"Chasing Pavements"	86%	✔	✔	✔	✗

- During this fourth episode, Axel was replaced by singer Kike Teruel.

==== Episode 5 ====
April 28, 2015

Order	Artist	Song	Total percentage	Experts' choices			
Order	Artist	Song	Total percentage	Miranda!	El Puma	Soledad	Axel
1	Iván Seremczuk	"Bailar pegados"	56%	✗	✗	✔	✔
2	Dominique Blousson	"Price Tag"	39%	✗	✔	✗	✗
3	Martín Williams	"Kilómetros"	22%	✗	✗	✗	✗
4	Gold Rain Band	"Happy"	70%	✗	✗	✔	✔
5	César Franco	"Horóscopo"	76%	✗	✗	✔	✔
6	Franco Silva	"Atrévete-te-te"	91%	✔	✔	✔	✔
7	Jorge Kokor	"Moscato, pizza y fainá"	95%	✔	✔	✔	✔
8	Dana Salguero	"La soledad"	32%	✗	✗	✗	✗
9	Sol Giménez	"Chandelier"	87%	✔	✔	✔	✔

==== Episode 6 ====
April 30, 2015

Order	Artist	Song	Total percentage	Experts' choices			
Order	Artist	Song	Total percentage	Miranda!	El Puma	Soledad	Axel
1	Rodrigo Alk	"La llave"	54%	✗	✔	✗	✗
2	Sol Bua	"Diamonds"	23%	✗	✗	✗	✗
3	Lucía Tacchetti	"Lento"	75%	✗	✗	✔	✔
4	Sebastián Saravia	"I gotta feeling"	29%	✗	✗	✗	✔
5	Juan Cruz Porta	"Spaguetti del rock"	52%	✗	✗	✗	✔
6	Nicolás & Sara Menta	"Llorar"	96%	✔	✔	✔	✔
7	Matías Albertengo	"Te voy a amar"	89%	✔	✔	✔	✔
8	Claudio Lauría	"El matador"	55%	✗	✗	✗	✔
9	Carla Chomer	"Cry me a river"	88%	✔	✔	✔	✔

==== Episode 7 ====
May 5, 2015

Order	Artist	Song	Total percentage	Experts' choices			
Order	Artist	Song	Total percentage	Miranda!	El Puma	Soledad	Axel
1	Liliana Scalise	"Tengo todo excepto a ti"	51%	✗	✔	✗	✔
2	Ignacio Novarino	"I'm yours"	93%	✔	✔	✔	✔
3	Fiorella Guidi	"Somewhere over the rainbow"	87%	✔	✔	✔	✔
4	Cristian Vivaldi	"Mientes"	68%	✔	✔	✔	✗
5	Delfina Cheb	"Moon River"	57%	✔	✗	✔	✗
6	Osvaldo Pizarro	"Nessun dorma"	94%	✔	✔	✔	✔
7	Cristian García	"Porque yo te amo"	88%	✔	✔	✔	✔
8	Itatí Ortega	"La flor de la canela"	93%	✔	✔	✔	✔
9	Agustín Serra	"Only you"	66%	✔	✗	✗	✗

=== Elimination table ===
Artist	Audition	Duels	Top 13	Quarters Finals	Semi Finals	Finale
Malen Panicchelli	89%					

Blue numbers indicate the highest voting percentage for each week.
Red numbers indicate the lowest voting percentage of each week.
The performer was eliminated that week.
The performer won Rising Star.
The performer was the runner-up.
The performer placed third.
The performer placed fourth.
