= Es Mentira =

2002 studio album by Miranda!

Studio album by Miranda!
- Released: November 1, 2002
- Recorded: 2002
- Studio: Estudio Acum23 (Buenos Aires)
- Genre: Electropop
- Length: 46:37
- Language: Spanish
- Label: Secsy Discos; Pelo Music (2005 reissue); Sony Music (2016 reissue)
- Producer: Bruno De Vincenti

Miranda! chronology
Es Mentira (2002)	Sin Restricciones (2004)

Singles from Es Mentira
- 1. "Bailarina" Released: January 2003; 2. "Imán" Released: March 2003; 3. "Tu Juego" Released: November 2003; 4. "Romix" Released: January 2004; 5. "Agua" Released: July 2004

Es Mentira (lit. 'is a lie') is the debut studio album by Argentine band Miranda!. It was released by Secsy Discos on November 1, 2002. The ten songs that are part of the album are composed by Alejandro Sergi, produced by Bruno De Vincenti and mastered by Luis Castillo at the Acum23 studio in Buenos Aires. Es Mentira is an electropop record.

It had two reissues, in 2005 by Pelo Discos, and in 2016 by Sony Music.

== Singles ==
The first song released as a single was "Bailarina", which featured a music video made by Doma, a group also in charge of the album's cover art. The music video was published and broadcast in January 2003 on the Locomotion channel. Months later, the music videos for three more tracks were published: "Imán", "Tu Juego" and "Agua".

== Critical reception ==
"Es Mentira" received positive reviews from critics. A writer for the Argentine newspaper Clarín defined the album as "the return of glamour" and also described it as "a festive refuge in the midst of a crisis", alluding to the 2001 Crisis that was taking place in the country due to the 1998–2002 Argentine great depression. In a 2022's review, Revista Charco's Octavio Gallo wrote: "the album combines a beautiful pop melody with a strongly electronic and very danceable rhythm, the two most important elements of Miranda!'s sound".

== Track listing ==
All songs written by Alejandro Sergi and produced by Bruno De Vicenti.

Es Mentira track listing
No.	Title	Length
1.	"Bailarina"	4:43
2.	"Horóscopo"	4:42
3.	"Romix"	3:57
4.	"Imán"	4:23
5.	"Tu Juego"	4:02
6.	"Agua"	4:44
7.	"Ven"	5:06
8.	"Mentira"	3:53
9.	"Tiempo"	5:36
10.	"Casualidad"	5:35
Total length:		46:37

== Credits and personnel ==
Credits adapted from the liner notes of Es Mentira.

- Alejandro Sergi – lead vocals, composition, programming
- Juliana Gatttas – lead vocals
- Leandro Fuentes – guitar, background vocals
- Bruno de Vincenti – production, programming
- Sebastián Rimoldi – piano
- Luis Castillo – mastering
- Laura Bilbao – management
- Rodrigo Piza – executive production
- Walter Zamora – art direction
