= Miranda Es Imposible! =

2009 studio album by Miranda!

Studio album by Miranda!
- Released: August 24, 2009
- Recorded: 2008 – 2009
- Genre: Pop rock; latin pop
- Length: 35:01
- Language: Spanish
- Label: Pelo Music; Sony Music (2016 reissue)
- Producer: Cachorro López

Miranda! chronology
| El Disco de Tu Corazón (2007) | Miranda Es Imposible! (2009) | Magistral (2011) |

Singles from Miranda Es Imposible!
- 1. "Mentía" Released: June 22, 2009; 2. "Lo Que Siento Por Ti" Released: November 23, 2009; 3. "Tu Misterioso Alguien" Released: June 10, 2010

Miranda Es Imposible!, also known as Es Imposible! (lit. 'It's impossible!') is the fourth studio album by the Argentine band Miranda!, released on August 24, 2009, by Pelo Music.

== Critical reception ==
Professional ratings
Review scores
| Source | Rating |
|---|---|
| AllMusic | 3/5 stars |

In a review from AllMusic, Mariano Prunes wrote that "not surprisingly", everything in Es Imposible! sounds "big, polished, and ready to take over the airwaves of an entire continent", "but sadly, much is lost in the process". He praised the band's "vocal and songwriting talent", "catchy melodies" and "marvelously spiraling choruses", but also said that "they may achieve stardom at the cost of their fun and originality, is sad indeed".

A Clarín contributor described Es Imposible! as an album "more rock and organic than the rest", "with more serious sounds and less gossip than any of its predecessors" like El Disco de Tu Corazón. He praised Sergi's "vocal experimentation" and the self-confidence and freshness in the search for a dark album, comparing it to the contemporary Twilight saga.

=== Accolades ===
| Year | Ceremony | Category | Result | Ref. |
|---|---|---|---|---|
| 2010 | Premios Gardel | Best Pop Group Album | Won | |

== Track listing ==
All songs written by Alejandro Sergi and produced by Cachorro López.

Miranda Es Imposible! track listing
| No. | Title | Length |
|---|---|---|
| 1. | "Mentía" | 3:35 |
| 2. | "Lo Que Siento Por Ti" | 3:12 |
| 3. | "Romance Juvenil" | 3:36 |
| 4. | "El Showcito" | 3:16 |
| 5. | "Tu Mirada" | 3:23 |
| 6. | "Tu Misterioso Alguien" | 4:04 |
| 7. | "Si Pudiera Volver" | 3:10 |
| 8. | "No Lo Digas" | 3:38 |
| 9. | "Entre Mis Brazos" | 3:47 |
| 10. | "Hola Probando" | 3:16 |
| Total length: | | 35:01 |

== Credits and personnel ==
Credits adapted from the liner notes of Miranda Es Imposible!.

- Alejandro Sergi – lead vocals, composition, programming, guitar
- Juliana Gatttas – lead vocals
- Leandro Fuentes – guitar
- Nicolás Grimaldi – bass
- Cachorro López – production
- Daniel Avila – drums, percussion
- Sebastián Schon – keyboards, acoustic guitar
- Gabriel Lucena – keyboards
- Ezequiel Deró – keyboards
- Nicolás Guerieri – keyboards
- Demian Nava – programming
- Capri – programming

== Charts ==
Chart performance for Miranda Es Imposible!
| Chart (2009) | Peak position |
|---|---|
| Mexican Albums (AMOPROFON) | 70 |
