= Miranda! =

Argentine electropop band

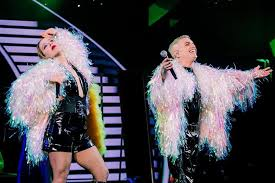
- Miranda! at the Viña del Mar International Song Festival in 2024

Background information
- Origin: Buenos Aires, Argentina
- Genres: Electropop; synthpop; pop rock; dub; indie pop
- Years active: 2001–present
- Labels: Pelo; Sony Latin
- Members: Alejandro Sergi; Juliana Gattas (Juliana Romina Gattas Salinas)
- Past members: Bruno De Vincenti; Leandro "Lolo" Fuentes; Nicolás "Monoto" Grimaldi
- Website: mirandaenvivo.com

Miranda! is an Argentine electropop band formed in Buenos Aires in 2001. Original band members include Alejandro Sergi (lead vocals, guitar, keyboards), Juliana Gattas (lead vocals), Lolo Fuentes (guitar), Bruno de Vincenti (programming), and Nicolás Grimaldi (bass). It is currently a duo between Sergi and Gattas.

The band's sound draws from electropop, pop rock, dub, synthpop, indie pop, and house music genres. The group has found success throughout Latin America as well as in Spain and the United States. Miranda! has earned two nominations for the Latin Grammy Awards, one MTV Europe Music Awards, twenty MTV Video Music Awards Latinoamérica, seven Premios Gardel, one Los 40 Music Awards and multiple Gaviota awards from the Viña del Mar International Song Festival.

== History ==
=== 2000–2003: Early years ===
Before Miranda!, the musicians Gori Leva, Alejandro Sergi and Juliana Gattas formed a trio called Los 3 Lirios, where Leva and Sergi were programmers and Gattas the singer, reversing jazz songs in an electronic style. For their presentations, which were held at Cemento, Sergi wrote the first song called "Imán", and received positive reviews, including from guitarist Leandro Fuentes. Months later, they formed the band. In 2001, Sergi teamed up with Gattas, Fuentes and Bruno de Vincenti to form Miranda!, labeling their style as melodramatic electropop. Named after Argentinian actor Osvaldo Miranda, the group finally met the actor in December 2002 during the Buen Dia Arriba Festival in Palermo.

Their popularity grew around the Buenos Aires underground music circuit, based on their peculiar music, style and looks. Their unique live performances, in which the band members "acted out" the lyrics of their songs, gained them a great number of followers, as well as a number of prizes in such publications as the Argentine version of the Rolling Stone magazine, which named them the Revelation Band of 2002. In November of the same year they released Es Mentira, their first album which would spawn five singles: "Bailarina," "Imán," "Tu Juego," "Agua" and "Romix." It was published by the independent label Secsy Discos, with the collaboration of the Locomotion television channel, where the music videos of the singles were published. Their presentations were described as "glamorous and melodramatic", and ranked them as "the most outstanding group of the Buenos Aires indie-electronic scene", receiving the nickname "the monster of the under".

In May 2003, Nicolás Grimaldi ("Monoto") joined the group as bassist. That year, Miranda! achieved their first nominations at the MTV Video Music Awards Latinoamérica, in the Best Independent Artist and Best New Artist - Argentina categories. After their first appearance on MTV, they offered their first concert in a theater, at the Ateneo de Buenos Aires, with the special participation of singer Gustavo Cerati.

=== 2004–2006: Sin Restricciones ===
The band's second album, Sin Restricciones, was released on September 21, 2004, and was described as the mainstream breakthrough of the band, with hits like "Yo Te Diré" or "Don," which would go on to be one of the most downloaded ringtones in the world by 2005. Other singles out of this album were "Navidad," "El Profe," "Uno los Dos" and "Traición." It was produced by Eduardo Schmidt and Pablo Romero, from the band Árbol. The album was released by the Secsy Discos label with the collaboration of Locomotion, mixed at Panda studios in Buenos Aires and mastered in Los Angeles, United States, by Tom Baker. It was launched and presented on September 21 at the Ateneo de Buenos Aires, and due to high demand, they had to add one more show for that same day. Sin Restricciones reached number 11 on the Mexican Album Chart and was certified Platinum in Argentina, Colombia and México.

Miranda received seven MTV VMALA nominations between 2004 and 2005 for their work on their second album, winning two categories; Best Alternative Artist and Best Artist—South. They also won the Best Pop Group Album category for the first time at the Premios Gardel. In December they signed with Pelo Music. After the media diffusion throughout Latin America, they performed a concert at the Gran Rex theater in Buenos Aires, a presentation that was recorded to be edited on a DVD that came out months later under the name En Vivo Sin Restricciones, which included the majority of their songs plus a song that was never recorded in a studio, but that was part of their live performances during his early years, called "Salgamos". In the month of September 2005 they opened for Moby in Santiago. They also performed in Paraguay for the Pilsen Rock in front of more than 45,000 people, together with the groups 2 Minutos and Attaque 77.

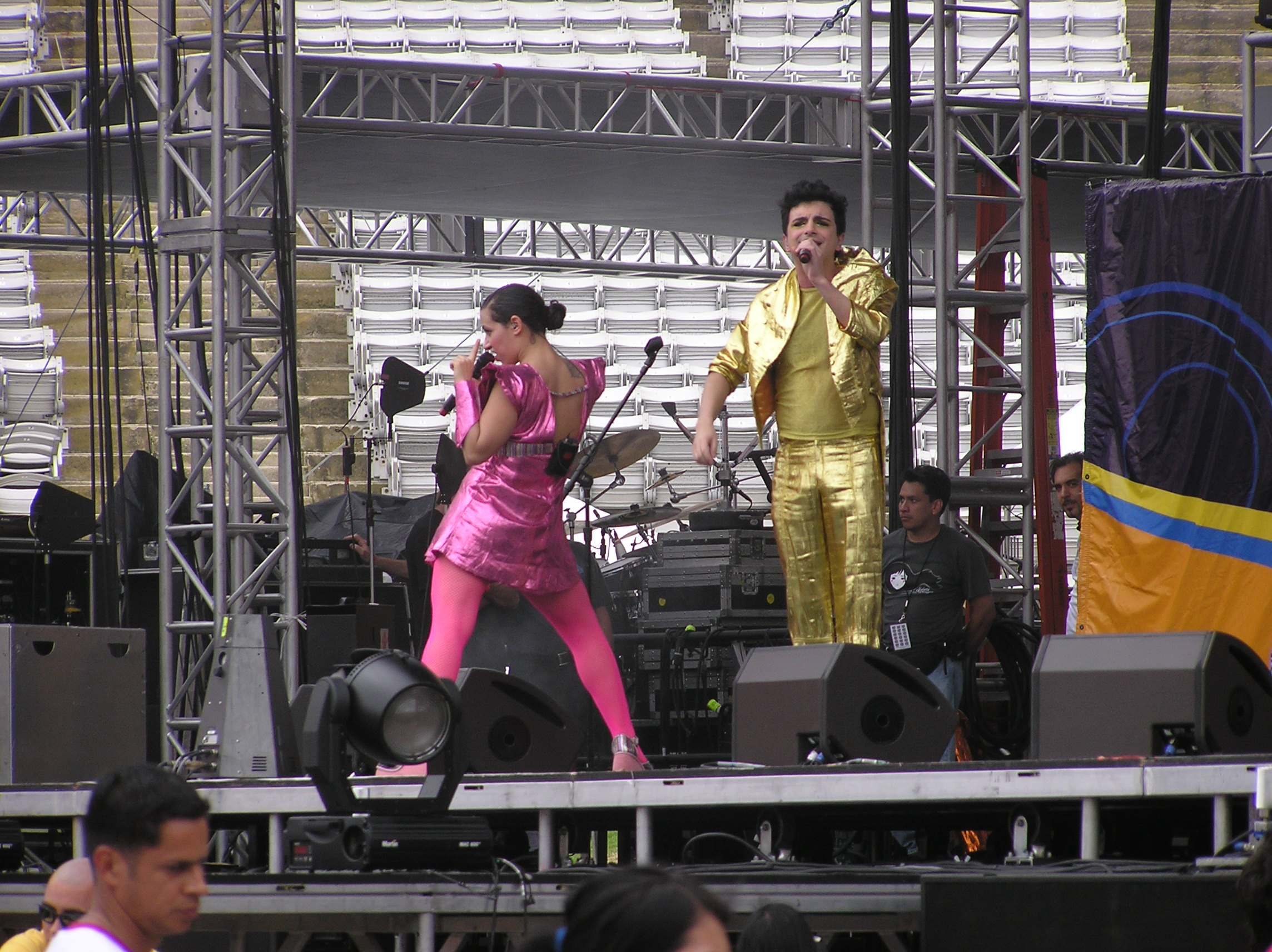
Miranda! performing in 2006

In January 2006, the band participated in the annual Cosquín Rock festival, together with artists such as Patricio Rey y sus Redonditos de Ricota, Las Pelotas, La mancha de Rolando, among others. In February they were recognized with all the awards at the Viña del Mar International Song Festival (Antorcha de Plata, Antorcha de Oro and Gaviota de Plata).

Between albums, on July 20, 2006, they released their first EP titled Quereme! Tributo a las Telenovelas, containing three new tracks that were formerly the theme songs of successful telenovelas from Argentina; "Quiéreme… tengo frío" from Piel Naranja, starring Arnaldo André and Marilina Ross in 1975; "Una lágrima sobre el teléfono" from Una voz en el teléfono, starring Carolina Papaleo and Raúl Taibo in 1990; and "Esa extraña dama" from the telenovela with the same name, starring Luisa Kuliok and Jorge Martínez. These songs were performed at the 2006 Martín Fierro Awards TV show, and then released as a single CD in Argentina. During the same year, the band visited the city of La Paz in Bolivia, at the Urban Fest, sharing the stage with La Mosca, another band of Argentine origin.

=== 2007–2008: El Disco de Tu Corazón and compilation album ===
At the beginning of 2007, the programmer Bruno De Vincenti left the band due to artistic differences. El Disco de Tu Corazón, the band's third studio album and the first with Pelo Music, was released on April 1. "Prisionero," the first single, released two days before, became a number one hit in their native Argentina. The second single, "Perfecta", featuring Mexican singer Julieta Venegas, was released on July 9. "Enamorada" and "Hola" were also released as singles. The other collaboration on the album was with Fangoria on the song "Vete De Aquí".

The album topped the Argentine album chart, being the band's first to do so. El Disco de Tu Corazón was nominated for the 2007 Latin Grammy Awards in the Best Pop Album by a Duo or Group with Vocal category. It was also nominated for the Premios Gardel 2008 in the Best Pop Group Album category.

At the end of 2007 they published the live album El Disco de Tu Corazón + Vivo, which included two CDs: the first being the original recorded in the studio, and the second that include the twelve songs they performed on August 9 and 10 of that same year at the Gran Rex theater, with also the remixed versions of "Perfecta" (with the voice of Juliana Gattas instead of Julieta Venegas) and "Prisionero", and the video clips of "Prisionero", "Hola" (which was the theme song of the Argentine telenovela Lalola) and "Perfecta".

On July 25, 2008, they released their first compilation album, El Templo del Pop. The record material was made up of a compiled CD that brought together the band's greatest hits, as well as two new songs: "Chicas" and "Mi propia vida", and a remix titled "Mirandamix", by DJ Deró. The DVD was made up of seventeen video clips made by the group throughout their career. The album was certified Gold in Spain. In August of the same year, they performed at the annual charity festival Un Sol Para Los Chicos at the Luna Park theater, being the main attraction of the night.

=== 2009–2012: Miranda Es Imposible! and Magistral ===
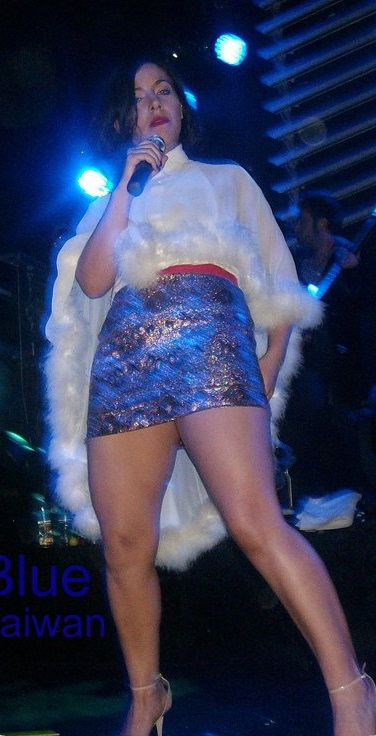
Juliana Gattas

"Mentía", released on June 22, 2009, was the first single from the band's fourth album, titled Miranda Es Imposible!, which was published by Pelo Music in August of that same year. In November, the music video for "Lo que siento por ti", the second single from the album, was released on television and the Internet. In December of the same year, they released Miranda Directo!, their fourth live album that included images of the band's presentation at the Gran Rex theatre on October 2, 2009. In June 2010, the official video for "Tu Misterioso Alguien" came out, the third single from the album. That year they won the Best Pop Group Album award at the Premios Gardel.

The lead single of their fifth studio album was titled "Ritmo Y Decepción". In June 2011, coinciding with their tenth anniversary, the group revealed the name of their next album: Magistral, which would immediately be promoted with the second single titled "Ya Lo Sabía". The album was released on September 9 and was entirely produced by Cachorro López. It was the band's first project to chart in Spain, reaching number 90. It also was the fourth to chart in México, peaking at number 92 and charting for one week.

In 2012 they continued to release other singles with their corresponding video clips: "Dice Lo Que Siente" and "Puro Talento". For their work on the album, the band was nominated for one MTV Europe Music Awards, seven Premios Quiero (winning three), seven Gardel Awards (winning one), and one Nickelodeon Argentina Kids' Choice Awards.

In that same year Juliana Gattas and Alejandro Sergi were coaches for the Telefe talent show La Voz Argentina, Based on the reality singing competition The Voice of Holland. The vocalist also formed an alternate group with Marcelo Moura, releasing a new studio album called Choque. At the end of 2012, they were in charge of putting music to the Argentine film "Caídos del mapa", with the song "Gran Amistad". Sergi was also a guest coach for two programs in Tu cara me suena.

=== 2013–2016: Safari ===
"Extraño", the first single from their sixth studio album, was released on December 19, 2013. On January 22, 2014, was confirmed that guitarist Leandro "Lolo" Fuentes would no longer be part of the band, so they continued the production of the album without him. His departure was described by Fuentes as "surprising", due to the fact that he was fired by his bandmates. He was in parallel starting his solo career.

Finally, the album Safari was published by Pelo Music on July 22, 2014, which was also preceded by the second single titled "Fantasmas", released on June 16. It reached number 96 on the Spanish Albums Chart. The band collaborated for the second time with Fangoria, in the version of the song "Miro La Vida Pasar". The album was nominated for the Premios Gardel for the Album Of The Year and Best Pop Group Album categories, winning the latter.

On January 24, 2015, they participated in the eleventh version of the Personal Fest festival together with Coti Sorokin, Illya Kuryaki and the Valderramas, Maxi Trusso and Close. The same year Sergi and Gattas are called to be juries in Elegidos, la música en tus manos on the Telefe network. At the same time, Sergi, together with Cachorro López, Julieta Venegas and Didi Gutman, forms another alternate group to Miranda! called Meteoros.

In 2016 they released another live album consisting of two CDs plus a DVD, which include songs from the band's repertoire, a version of the song "Amor Amarillo" by Gustavo Cerati, "I Love It" by Icona Pop and collaborations with Los Tipitos. The album is named after Miranda! Vivo. The second compilation called El Templo Del Pop 2 was also published.

=== 2016–2018: Fuerte ===
On October 5, 2016, Sergi presented another alternate group to Miranda! called Satellite 23, which is made up of him, Diego Poso and Gabriel Lucena. At the end of the year, on November 11, the single "743" was released along with its video clip, which was the first preview of their studio album Fuerte. At the beginning of 2017 they released the song "Quiero Vivir A Tu Lado", composed for the Argentine telenovela of the same name. Both songs reached top 20 on the Argentine and Uruguayan charts.

On March 3, 2017, the band confirmed the separation (after almost 15 years) of Nicolás "Monoto" Grimaldi, the group's historic bassist. Being this one of the last official members of the band, after his departure, the group would present itself as a duo. On April 21, 2017, Fuerte was finally published, produced by Cachorro López and Alejandro Sergi, this being the first record material released under the Sony Music label. In the album they had the special participation of Natalia Oreiro in the song "Tu hombre", by Jesús Navarro (Reik singer) in the song "Enero" and Carlos Sadness in "Cálido y rojo", whose participation was only published together to the single that accompanies the video clip. In November of the same year, they toured Spain, being their first solo tour in that country. Fuerte gave the band their second Latin Grammy Awards nomination, in the Best Pop/Rock Album category.

In 2018 they released two standalone singles titled "Lejos De Vos" and "Colisión".

=== 2019–2021: Precoz and Souvenir ===
The group surprisingly released their second EP titled Precoz on December 13, 2019, which contains eight songs.

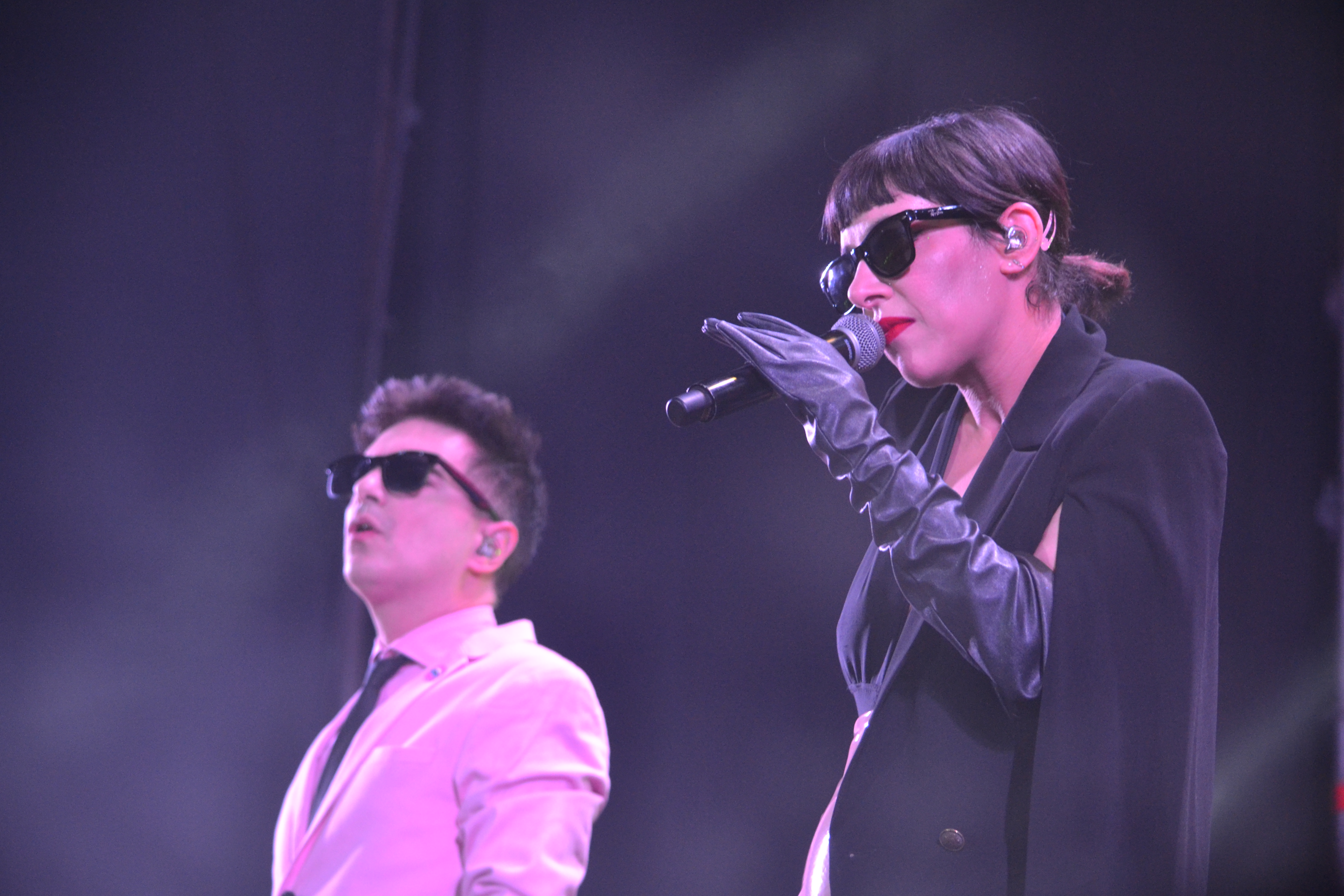
Miranda! performing in 2020

The singles "Me Gustas Tanto" and "Un Tiempo" were released that same year as a preview of their eighth studio album. The as-yet-unnamed album was initially slated for a mid-2020 release, but after the arrival of the COVID-19 pandemic in Argentina, it ended up being postponed to next year, 2021. On May 1, 2020, the song "Casi Feliz" was released, which was composed to be the theme song for the Netflix series of the same name, starring Sebastián Wainraich and Natalie Pérez. The songs "Luna De Papel" and "Entre Las Dos" were released in August and December of that same year respectively.

The release date of Souvenir along with its cover art, was announced on April 28, 2021. Finally, the album was released on May 7. Sergi described it as "not a return to the beginning, but a review of the entire career of the band, wanting to do what they always do, but better." Both projects, Precoz and Souvenir won the Best Pop Group Album category at the Premios Gardel, being the band's sixth and seventh award in the category respectively.

=== 2022–present: Standalone singles and Hotel Miranda! ===
Between albums, they released several standalone singles in collaboration with other artists and solo. They participated in the single "Respirar" by singer Uri from the Montevideo Music Group. On March 4, 2022, their new single "El Arte De Recuperarte" was released, while the recording of what will be the next studio album was being prepared. On June 14, 2022, they collaborated on the single "Papeles" by the Argentine artist Oscu. Their single titled "Dos" with Argentine rapper Dillom was released on August 25, 2022. An article by Argentine music magazine Indie Hoy included Miranda! album Es Mentira as one of the ten great albums turning 20 years old that year.

The band's first remix album, titled Hotel Miranda!, was released on April 19, 2023. It has 11 new versions of Miranda!'s old songs with collaborations of other artists. "It's a celebration of our repertoire and our career," Alejandro Sergi said. A new version of "Don", alongside singer Ca7riel, released on August 25, 2022, served as the lead single of the album, and peaked at number 40 on the Argentina Hot 100. The second versioned single was the song "Navidad", together with Bandalos Chinos, which was released on December 8.

"Yo Te Diré", the third single, also original from the album Sin Restricciones, with Lali Espósito, was released on January 20, 2023, and reached number 26 on the Argentine chart. The band performed at the Medio y Medio Festival in Punta Ballena, Maldonado, Uruguay, on January 28. The fourth single, "Uno Los Dos", with Emilia Mernes, was released on February 23. It was their first song to reach the top 15 of the Billboard Argentina Hot 100, since its creation in 2018.

On March 17 they announced the release of the new version of the single "Prisionero" from El Disco de Tu Corazón, in collaboration with the Mexican singer Cristian Castro, which was released on March 20. On April 12, they announced the release of "Perfecta", with María Becerra and FMK. The track peaked at number 8 on the Billboard Argentina Hot 100, being the band's first song to reach the top ten of the chart in that country. With the release of the album, the songs "Mentía" with Chano, "Enamorada" with Francisca Valenzuela, and "Ya Lo Sabía" with Sofía Reyes were released. Two of the eleven songs on the album were not released. The songs "Traición" with Emmanuel Horvilleur and Juan Ingaramo, and "Tu Misterioso Alguien" with Andrés Calamaro were released weeks later, after being titled "Room reserved for May 9" and "Room available" respectively.

On October 9, 2025, the duo was announced to be taking part in the Spanish television song contest Benidorm Fest 2026 alongside Spanish musical act bailamama. Their song “Despierto Amándote” was released on December 18. They finished in 5th place, coming top 3 with the public voting.

== Band members ==
Current members

- Alejandro Sergi – lead vocals (2001–present), guitar (2007–present), keyboards (2017–present)
- Juliana Gattas – lead vocals (2001–present)

Former members

- Leandro Fuentes – guitar, backing vocals (2001–2014)
- Nicolás Grimaldi – bass (2003–2017)
- Bruno De Vincenti – programming (2001–2007)

Current touring musicians

- Gabriel Lucena – rhythm guitar (2009–2017, 2022–present), keyboards, programming (2010–2017), backing vocals (2010–present), bass (2017–present)
- Ludovica Morell – drums (2010–present)

Former touring musicians

- Sebastián Rimoldi – keyboards (2006–2010), programming (2007–2010)
- Dany Ávila – drums (2009–2010)
- Anuk Sforza – rhythm guitar (2017–2022)

== Discography ==
- Es Mentira (2002)
- Sin Restricciones (2004)
- El Disco de Tu Corazón (2007)
- Miranda Es Imposible! (2009)
- Magistral (2011)
- Safari (2014)
- Fuerte (2017)
- Souvenir (2021)
- Hotel Miranda! (2023)

== Awards and nominations ==
For their work in music, Miranda! has received various accolades, including twenty MTV Video Music Awards Latinoamérica, eight Premios Gardel, one MTV Europe Music Awards, one Los 40 Music Awards and one Silver Seagull, two Golden Torches and two Silver Torch at the Viña del Mar International Song Festival. They also have two nominations for the Latin Grammy Awards, one for the Martín Fierro Awards, two for the Nickelodeon Argentina Kids' Choice Awards.
