= Sin Restricciones =

2004 studio album by Miranda!

Studio album by Miranda!
- Released: September 21, 2004
- Recorded: 2004
- Studio: Panda (Buenos Aires)
- Genre: Pop rock; synth-pop; electropop
- Length: 38:25
- Language: Spanish
- Label: Secsy Discos; Pelo Music (2005 reissue); Sony Music (2016 reissue)
- Producer: Eduardo Schmidt; Pablo Romero

Miranda! chronology
Es Mentira (2002)	Sin Restricciones (2004)	El Disco de Tu Corazón (2007)

Singles from Sin Restricciones
- 1. "Yo Te Diré" Released: October 29, 2004; 2. "Navidad" Released: December 16, 2004; 3. "Don" Released: April 18, 2005; 4. "El Profe" Released: October 14, 2005; 5. "Uno Los Dos" Released: March 10, 2006; 6. "Traición" Released: October 20, 2006

Sin Restricciones (lit. 'No Restrictions') is the second studio album by Argentine band Miranda!, released on September 21, 2004 by Secsy Discos.

== Background and release ==
At the beginning of 2004, while their first album, Es Mentira, was being edited in Mexico and Chile, after being remixed and remastered by Tony Rodriguez, Mario Breuer and Andrés Breuer, the band finished recording and mixing their second album. Produced by Árbol members Eduardo Schmidt and Pablo Romero, the album was mixed at Panda studios in Buenos Aires and mastered in Los Angeles, United States, by Tom Baker.

After the release of the album and the good reception by the public, the band performed their first two sold-out concerts, at the Teatro Gran Rex. The recording of the shows were chosen to be the group's first live DVD: En Vivo Sin Restricciones!, which was released in July 2005.

== Accolades ==
Sin Restricciones gave Miranda! their first nomination for the Carlos Gardel Awards, being in the category of Best Pop Group Album, which they ended up winning.

Year	Ceremony	Category	Result	Ref.
2005	Premios Gardel	Best Pop Group Album	Won	

== Track listing ==
All songs written by Alejandro Sergi and produced by Eduardo Schmidt and Pablo Romero.

Sin Restricciones tracklist
No.	Title	Length
1.	"Yo Te Diré"	3:25
2.	"Don"	3:03
3.	"Quiero"	3:45
4.	"Vuelve a Ti"	2:58
5.	"El Profe"	2:56
6.	"Otra Vez"	3:03
7.	"Tu Gurú"	3:14
8.	"Hoy"	3:17
9.	"El Agente"	2:47
10.	"Navidad"	3:11
11.	"Traición"	3:02
12.	"Uno Los Dos"	3:44
Total length:		38:25

== Credits and personnel ==
Credits adapted from AllMusic.

- Alejandro Sergi – vocals, composition, programming
- Juliana Gattas – vocals
- Demian Chorovicz – mixing
- Leandro Fuentes – guitar
- Monoto – bass
- Pablo Romero – production, acoustic guitar
- Eduardo Schmidt – production
- Bruno De Vincenti – programming
- Tom Baker – mastering
- Nicolás Grimaldi – graphic design

== Charts ==
=== Weekly charts ===
Chart (2004–2005)	Peak position
Mexican Albums (AMOPROFON)	11

=== Year-end charts ===
Chart (2005)	Peak position
Mexican Albums (AMOPROFON)	79

== Certifications and sales ==
Region	Certification	Certified units/sales
Argentina (CAPIF)	Platinum	40,000^{^}
Mexico (AMPROFON)	Platinum	100,000^{^}
^{^} Shipments figures based on certification alone.
