= El Disco de Tu Corazón =

2007 studio album by Miranda!

Studio album by Miranda!
- Released: May 1, 2007
- Recorded: May – December 2006
- Studios: Mondobeat (Buenos Aires); Masterhouse (Miami, mastering)
- Genres: Post-disco; synth-pop; dub; pop rock
- Length: 39:10
- Language: Spanish
- Labels: Pelo Music; Sony Music (2016 reissue)
- Producer: Cachorro López

Miranda! chronology
Sin Restricciones (2004)	El Disco de Tu Corazón (2007)	Miranda Es Imposible! (2009)

Singles from El Disco de tu Corazón
- 1. "Prisionero" Released: March 30, 2007; 2. "Perfecta" Released: July 9, 2007; 3. "Enamorada" Released: November 12, 2007; 4. "Hola" Released: January 21, 2008

El Disco de Tu Corazón (lit. 'The Album of Your Heart') is the third studio album by Argentine band Miranda!, released on May 1, 2007, by Pelo Music. Produced entirely by Cachorro López and composed by Alejandro Sergi, it is a post-disco, dub and pop rock record.

== Background and composition ==
According to Alejandro Sergi, on this record the band wanted to make songs that were different from those on Sin Restricciones, which were composed in major tones.

"That gave it a more of a rowdy sound, but it was much more minimal in vocal production, here aesthetically it looks a little more like Es Mentira, the first album, which we made more grandiose, epic", he said.

== Critical reception ==
In a positive review, Página 12 journalist Natali Schejtman complimented El Disco de Tu Corazón for its "impeccable production" and its "neat and catchy sound". She also wrote that this is "a fun record that relies heavily on its ability to produce excitement and the victory of the heart over the mind", and praised its "infallible virtue of generating a total party".

=== Accolades ===
Year	Ceremony	Category	Result	Ref.
2007	Latin Grammy Awards	Best Pop Album by a Duo or Group with Vocal	Nominated	
2008	Premios Gardel	Best Pop Group Album	Nominated	

== Track listing ==
All songs written by Alejandro Sergi and produced by Cachorro López.

El Disco de Tu Corazón standard edition
No.	Title	Length
1.	"Prisionero"	3:27
2.	"Hola"	3:05
3.	"Perfecta" (featuring Julieta Venegas)	3:45
4.	"Enamorada"	3:13
5.	"Nada Es Igual"	3:29
6.	"Dejame"	3:06
7.	"Amanece Junto a Mi"	3:07
8.	"Hasta Hoy"	3:21
9.	"Vete de Aquí" (featuring Fangoria)	3:11
10.	"No Me Celes"	3:16
11.	"Te Atreviste y Me Morí"	3:25
12.	"Voces"	2:40
Total length:		39:10

Spanish exclusive edition
No.	Title	Producer(s)	Length
13.	"Prisionero (Reggae Remix)"	Gabriel Lucena	3:27
14.	"Prisionero (Trance Remix)"	Gabriel Lucena	3:27
15.	"Prisionero (Capri Remix)"	Gabriel Lucena	3:27

== Credits and personnel ==
Credits adapted from AllMusic.

- Alejandro Sergi – vocals, guitar, programming, composition
- Julianna Gattas – vocals
- Pelo Aprile – executive production
- Jose Blanco – mastering
- Leandro Fuentes – guitar
- Cachorro López – arrangement, production, bass
- Sebastián Schon – arrangement, engineer, programming
- Ernesto Snajer – acoustic guitar
- Cesar Sogbe – mixing
- Julieta Venegas – lead vocals (3)
- Olvido Gara – lead vocals (9)
- Nacho Canut – bass guitar, keyboards (9)
- Gabriel Lucena – mixing (13, 14, 15)
- Alejandro Ros – graphic design

== Charts ==
=== Weekly charts ===
Chart (2007)	Peak position
Argentine Albums (CAPIF)	1
Mexican Albums (AMOPROFON)	29

=== Year-end charts ===
Chart (2005)	Peak position
Mexican Albums (AMOPROFON)	93
