= Bailar o Morir =

2026 studio album by Miranda! and Lali as BOM

Studio album by Miranda! and Lali as BOM
- Released: 3 November 2026
- Genres: Italo disco; dance-pop; house
- Length: 26:58
- Label: Sony Argentina
- Producers: Ale Sergi; Mauro De Tommaso

Miranda! chronology
Nuevo Hotel Miranda! (2025)	Bailar o Morir (2026)

Lali chronology
No Vayas a Atender Cuando el Demonio Llama (2017)	Bailar o Morir (2026)

Singles from Bailar o Morir
- 1. "Bailar o Morir" Released: 27 October 2026; 2. "En Italia" Released: 8 November 2026

Bailar o Morir (transl. Dance or Die) is the debut studio album by Argentine supergroup BOM, consisting of pop duo Miranda! members, Ale Sergi and Juliana Gattas, and singer Lali. It is the first collaborative album between the two acts, as well as Miranda!'s eleventh studio album and Lali's seventh. The album was released on 3 November 2026 by Sony Music Argentina. Its songs were written by Lali, Gattas, Sergi and Mauro De Tommaso, and produced by Sergi and De Tommaso. Musically, the album draws on italo disco, dance-pop and house and, lyrically, it is built around dancing as a form of liberation and escape, exploring the role of music and movement in everyday life.

== Background and development ==
Lali and Miranda!'s ties date back to 2017, when they first performed together on stage during the second date of Lali's Lali en Vivo tour at the Luna Park Stadium in Buenos Aires, where they performed "Irresistible", from her second studio album, Soy (2016). They reunited the following year during a Miranda! concert in Mar del Plata, where they performed "Ritmo y Decepción", "Enamorada" and "Irresistible". In 2020, they performed "Tu Amor", originally recorded by Charly García and Pedro Aznar for their album Tango 4 (1991), at the 22nd Annual Premios Gardel. Their first studio collaboration was released in January 2023, when Lali joined Miranda! for a new version of "Yo Te Diré", originally included on the duo's second studio album, Sin Restricciones (2004), for Hotel Miranda!, an album featuring guest artists reinterpreting songs from their catalogue. The collaboration was followed by "Mejor Que Vos", released in February 2025 as the third single from Lali's sixth studio album, No Vayas a Atender Cuando el Demonio Llama (2025), and their first original song together.

The idea for BOM emerged in 2025, while Lali and Miranda! members Ale Sergi and Juliana Gattas were working together as coaches on the fifth season of the Argentine television singing competition La Voz Argentina. During the program, they began sharing music and discussing songs they would like to perform together, initially considering recording an extended play (EP) of covers. They subsequently began meeting at Sergi's recording studio, where they experimented with different versions and arrangements, including translations of songs. One of the first tracks they worked on was "Adonde", a cover of a song by German band Cetu Javu that Lali had suggested. As the sessions progressed, they shifted towards writing original material, working alongside producer Mauro De Tommaso.

The three artists continued composing together, eventually accumulating 14 songs. The project had grown beyond the original idea of an EP of covers, and they decided to select ten tracks for a full-length album. Lali recalled the moment they realized how much material they had created, saying: "Dude, we've made an album. What do we do now?"

== Composition ==
=== Music ===
Bailar o Morir is primarily an italo disco album, incorporating elements of dance-pop and house. Its sound draws on the electronic music of the 1980s, characterized by synthesizers, sequenced bass lines and rhythmic pianos. In an interview with Billboard, Lali, Ale Sergi and Juliana Gattas described italo disco as a central reference from the project's earliest stages. They sought to revisit the genre's vintage sounds while giving them a contemporary production and incorporating elements of their own Argentine musical identity.

The album also incorporates house influences, particularly in its rhythmic piano arrangements, alongside techno and disco elements. For example, "Helecho" draws on disco music, while "Vivo del Pop" and "Hiperlove" incorporate techno influences. "Piel" and "Migajas", in contrast, have a more conventional pop sound. The trio described the album as musically varied rather than adhering strictly to a single genre.

=== Lyrics ===
The lyrics of Bailar o Morir explore themes of love, desire, sexuality, nightlife and celebration, with dancing serving as a recurring idea throughout the album. The title reflects the trio's view of dancing as a form of freedom and an escape from everyday difficulties. In an interview with Billboard, Lali described the dance floor as a place where people could feel free and momentarily leave behind the difficulties of their daily lives. She explained that the group wanted to make an album that listeners would enjoy dancing to, and that could provide moments of happiness and lasting memories. Sergi similarly described dancing as a way of moving forward and freeing the mind, although he clarified that the album was not intended to convey a specific social or political message.

Several songs approach these themes through humor and personal experiences. "Señora" portrays a woman who refuses to leave a bar before finishing the song she is dancing to. Lali explained that the character originated as an inside joke between her and Gattas about growing older and embracing the label of "señora" (Spanish for "lady" or "madam"). She also noted that the song extended beyond humor to touch on the vulnerability and disillusionment that people may conceal behind their public appearances. Elsewhere, "Migajas" addresses a troubled romantic relationship, while "Piel" explores erotic desire. The closing track, "Vivo del Pop", reflects on Sergi's life and work in music.

=== Songs ===
The album opens with its title track, "Bailar o Morir" (transl. "dance or die"), which introduces its central focus on dancing as a form of expression and freedom. Its lyrics describe shutting out the noise of the outside world and retreating into a private party, where the performers can clear their minds and focus entirely on dancing. It is followed by "Señora" (transl. "lady"), a humorous song inspired by nightlife and the experience of growing older. Its lyrics portray a woman reluctant to leave the club, who stays out until morning and admits that, despite claiming not to care what others think, she still enjoys being desired. "En Italia" (transl. "in Italy") incorporates electronic sounds that pay tribute to the music of Italian singer Raffaella Carrà. Its lyrics follow two women who escape their boredom by travelling to Italy, imagining a carefree holiday filled with romance and pleasure. "Migajas" (transl. "crumbs") addresses complicated romantic relationships through the perspective of friends advising someone to leave an unfulfilling relationship rather than continue accepting minimal affection.

The fifth track, "Adonde" (transl. "where"), is the album's only cover version, reworking a song by German synth-pop band Cetu Javu that Lali had suggested during the project's early recording sessions. Its lyrics revolve around a couple facing separation, with the singers questioning one another's departure and expressing reluctance to let go. "Hiperlove" (transl. "hyper love") features a fast techno arrangement and lead vocals by Sergi. Its lyrics portray an intense, almost hallucinatory attraction, combining romantic devotion with erotic imagery. "Ganar" (transl. "to win") further explores the album's electronic sound, using the language of competition and sport as a metaphor for sexual play and intimacy. "Piel" (transl. "skin") has an erotic theme and a more pop-oriented arrangement, focusing on the physical chemistry and sexual intimacy between two people.

The penultimate track, "Helecho" (transl. "fern"), draws on disco music and includes references to Donna Summer's "Bad Girls". Its lyrics portray the deterioration of a romantic relationship through domestic imagery, contrasting the excitement of its early stages with the routine of living together; the death of a fern bought for their home accompanies the relationship's decline. The album closes with "Vivo del Pop" (transl. "I live off pop"), a techno-influenced song in which Sergi reflects on his work in the music industry. Lali and Gattas sing about pop music as a vocation, describing performing as a demanding job that continues both day and night.

== Release and promotion ==
=== Identity and aesthetic ===
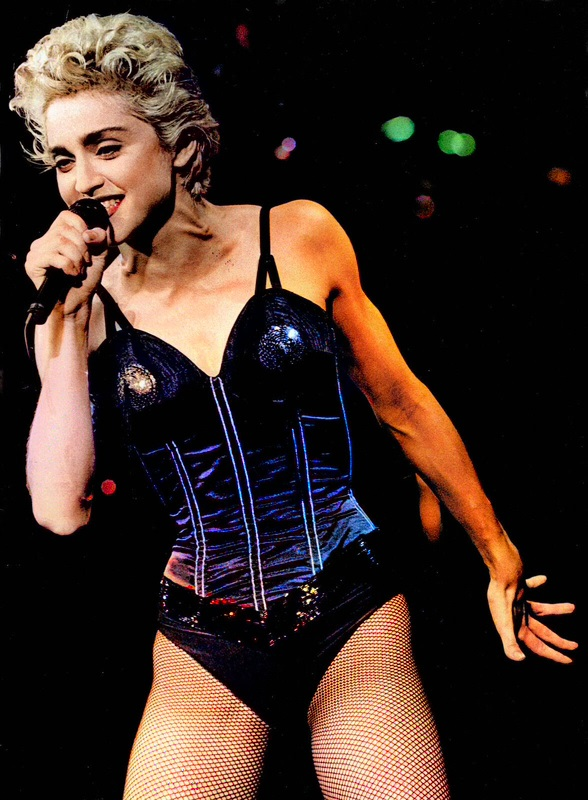
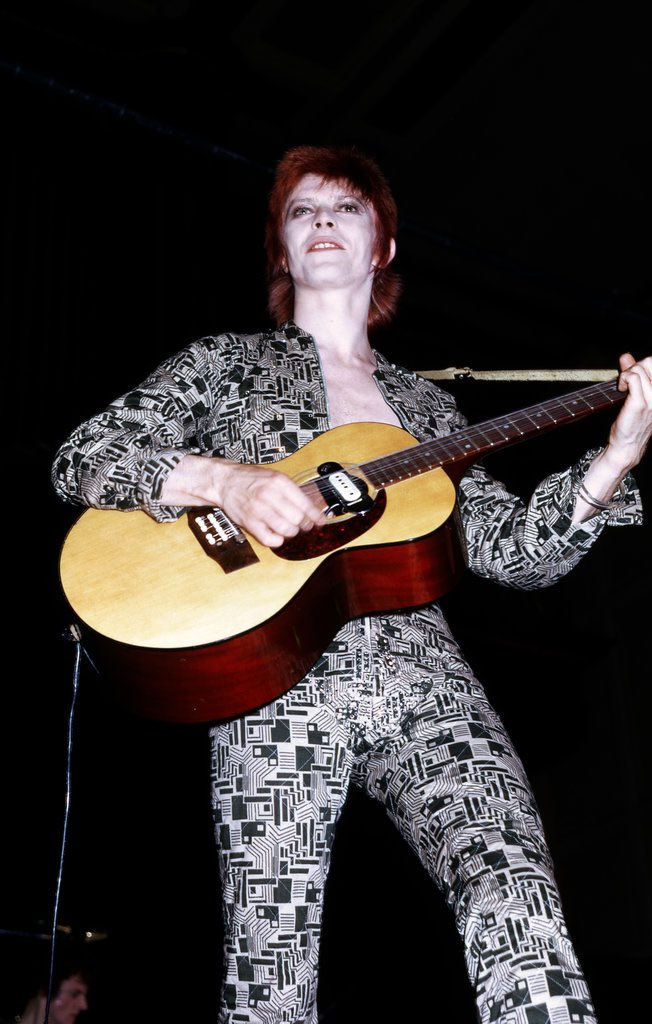
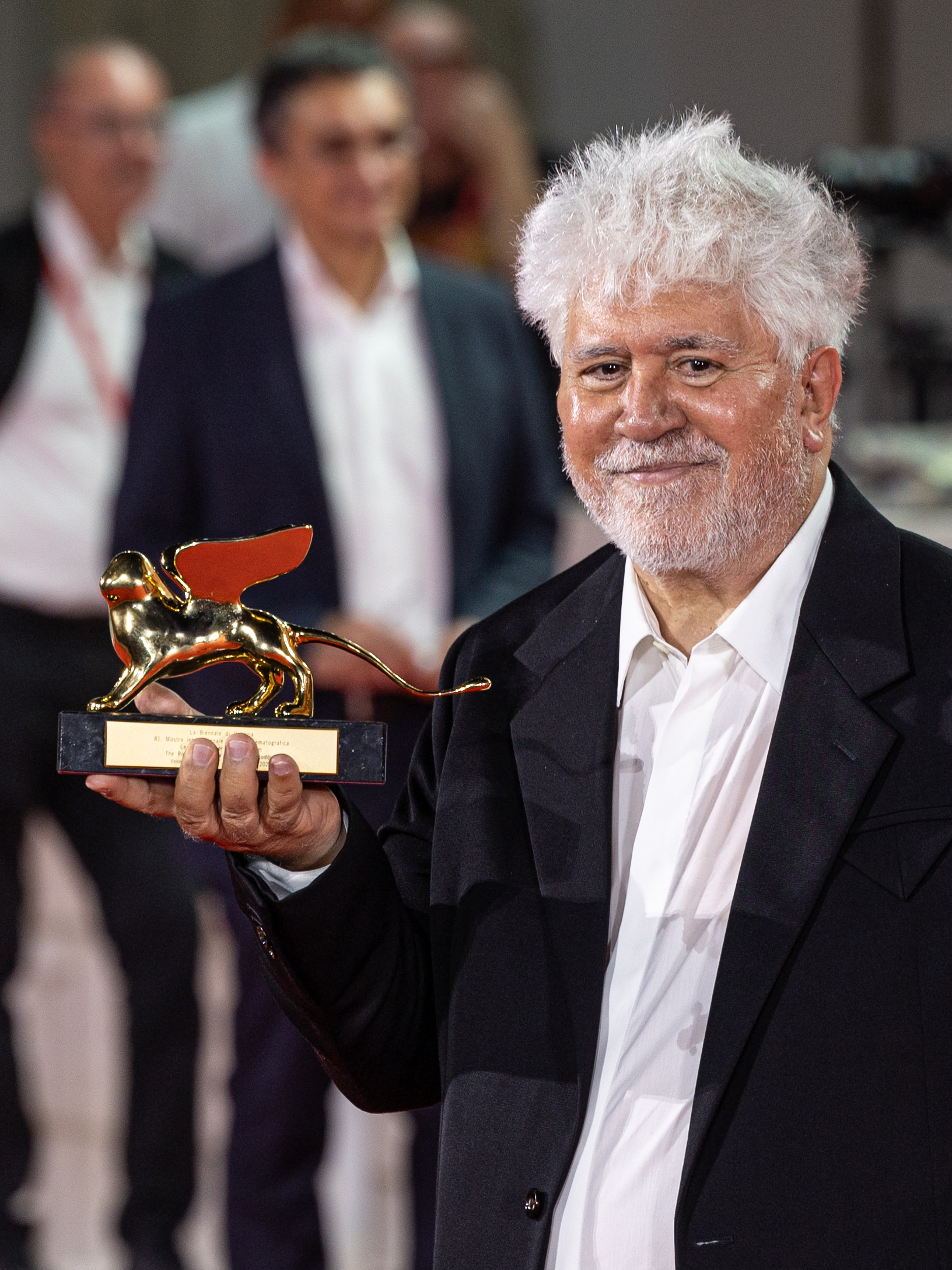
The album's aesthetic draws on visual references by Madonna (left), David Bowie (middle), and the cinematic universe of Pedro Almodóvar (right).

The visual identity of BOM was conceived as a distinct artistic project, combining elements associated with Lali and Miranda! while establishing a shared identity of its own. Lali and Gattas took a leading role in developing its aesthetic, drawing on visual references such as Madonna, David Bowie and filmmaker Pedro Almodóvar. Gattas described the project as a new character, which she likened to a "three-headed monster", whose own personality and appearance had to be developed independently of the artists' existing projects. The album's visual presentation was described as minimalist and elegant, with references to European fashion.

=== Marketing ===
The project began its public rollout in October 2026 through the official social media account @bomsystem. Starting on 16 October, the account published a series of posts combining visual fragments and numbers that gradually revealed the album's tracklist in reverse order.

On 27 October, BOM released "Bailar o Morir", the project's first single, alongside a 16-minute short film directed by Lautaro Espósito and Ale Ruax. The film introduces the project's fictional universe, beginning with Lali, Sergi and Gattas dressed in matching uniforms in a control room. From there, they travel through a series of settings, including an Italian city and a warehouse where a game of musical chairs takes on a life-or-death dimension. The film was presented as an introduction to the project's visual and conceptual identity rather than a conventional music video.

The single was introduced at a launch event attended by guests from the entertainment industry, featuring a live performance and a DJ set by Sergi himself. The event incorporated elements of the project's dance-oriented concept, including performance artists greeting attendees.

=== Distribution and singles ===
"Bailar o Morir" was released as the album's lead single on 27 October 2026 through Sony Music Argentina, accompanied by the short film. Its release also revealed the album's cover artwork and opened pre-saves for the full-length record.

Bailar o Morir was released on 3 November 2026 at 9 p.m. through Sony Music Argentina, making the ten-track album available on digital music platforms. Physical editions included compact discs and vinyl records. A limited edition of transparent vinyl signed by the three artists was made available at El Ateneo Grand Splendid in Buenos Aires, while red vinyl editions and CDs went on sale in stores from 4 November. The album was also accompanied by music videos for all its songs.

=== Tour ===
List of concerts
Date (2025)	City	Country	Venue
17 December 2026	Buenos Aires	Argentina	Movistar Arena
18 December 2026	Buenos Aires	Argentina	Movistar Arena
19 December 2026	Buenos Aires	Argentina	Movistar Arena
10 February 2027	Mexico City	Mexico	Auditorio Nacional
14 February 2027	Santiago	Chile	Santander Arena
20 February 2027	Lima	Peru	Costa 21
27 February 2027	Montevideo	Uruguay	Rambla of Montevideo

== Critical reception ==
The album received a positive review from Fernando Valeriani of Trama Sonora, who praised the chemistry between the three performers and their familiarity with pop music. He described the record as a celebration of dance music, combining nostalgia, hedonism and desire, and highlighted the group's ability to reinterpret a musical style they had already established in their respective careers. However, he also noted that the album largely revisited familiar territory rather than introducing a radically new direction.

In its coverage of the album's release, Billboard Argentina described the chemistry between Lali, Ale Sergi and Juliana Gattas as more interesting than the sum of their individual profiles. TN described the album as a novel musical proposal that brought together different facets of the three performers, highlighting its darker, rave-oriented electronic sound and its influences from disco, techno and Madonna's Confessions on a Dance Floor. It also noted the contrast between these electronic tracks and the more pop-oriented "Piel" and "Migajas".

Tomás Gorrini of El Planeta Urbano observed that the album retained recognizable elements of Miranda!'s musical identity while incorporating Lali's personality and energy, resulting in a project that aimed to function as more than an occasional collaboration. Río Negro similarly characterized the record as a conceptual album oriented towards synth-pop and the dance floor, describing dancing as a refuge and a space for freedom and collective experience.

Walter Domínguez of Clarín, writing after attending the album's preview presentation, described it as a well-produced dance-pop record, highlighting its electronic rhythms, synthesizers and shared vocal arrangements. He predicted that it would become a fixture in nightclubs and singled out "En Italia", "Hiperlove" and "Ganar" as potential hits.

== Track listing ==
All tracks are written by Alejandro Sergi, Juliana Gattas, Mariana Espósito and Mauro De Tommaso, except for "Adonde", written by Chris Demere.

Bailar o Morir track listing
No.	Title	Length
1.	"Bailar o Morir"	2:26
2.	"Señora"	2:16
3.	"En Italia"	2:17
4.	"Migajas"	2:28
5.	"Adonde"	2:44
6.	"Hiperlove"	3:14
7.	"Ganar"	2:20
8.	"Piel"	2:33
9.	"Helecho"	3:00
10.	"Vivo del Pop"	2:15
Total length:		26:58

=== Notes ===
- All track titles are stylized in all caps.

== Charts ==
Chart performance for Bailar o Morir
Chart (2026)	Peak position
Argentine Albums (CAPIF)	1
Argentine Albums (CAPIF) Red Vinyl Edition	3
