= BOM (group) =

Musical group of Miranda! and Lali

- Origin: Argentina
- Genre: Pop
- Years active: 2026–present
- Label: Sony Argentina
- Members: Alejandro Sergi; Juliana Gattas; Lali

BOM (Note: An acronym of "Bailar o Morir", the group's debut studio album.) (Spanish: [ˈbom]) is an Argentine pop supergroup formed in 2026 by singer Lali and duo Miranda! members Ale Sergi and Juliana Gattas. The three artists had collaborated in live performances, recordings and television before developing BOM as a separate musical project. Their debut album, Bailar o Morir, was released on 3 November 2026 by Sony Music Argentina.

== History ==
=== 2017–2022: Beginnings ===
Lali and Miranda! first performed together on 10 November 2017, during the second date of Lali's Lali en Vivo tour at the Luna Park arena in Buenos Aires. They performed "Irresistible", a song from Lali's second studio album, Soy (2016). They reunited on 30 January 2018 at a Miranda! concert in Mar del Plata, where they performed "Ritmo y Decepción" and "Enamorada", as well as "Irresistible".

On 18 September 2020, the artists performed together at the 22nd Annual Premios Gardel, which was held virtually amid the COVID-19 pandemic. They performed "Tu Amor", originally recorded by Charly García and Pedro Aznar for their 1991 album Tango 4.

=== 2023–2025: First studio collaborations ===
After years of live collaborations, the two artists joined forces on their first joint musical production in 2023. This collaboration resulted in a new version of the song "Yo Te Diré", originally included in Miranda!'s second studio album, Sin Restricciones (2004). The track was featured on Hotel Miranda! (2023), an album that brought together artists from various generations and genres to reimagine several of the duo's pop classics. However, this wasn't the first time they worked together in a recording studio. In a 2015 interview, Sergi revealed that Lali had visited his studio, and they had sung together, although they hadn't written any songs at that point. Sergi expressed admiration for Lali and shared his desire to collaborate with her in the future. That year, Lali released the Esperanza Mía soundtrack, which included "El Ritmo del Momento", a song written by Sergi.

In 2025, the artists released "Mejor Que Vos", their first original song together. Written by Lali, Sergi, Gattas and other collaborators, the song was produced by Mauro De Tommaso and Federico "Don" Barreto. It reached number 14 on the Billboard Argentina Hot 100 and received a Gold certification from the Argentine Chamber of Phonograms and Videograms Producers (CAPIF). At the 28th Annual Premios Gardel in 2026, the song won Best Pop Song, and was nominated for Song, Record, and Collaboration of the Year.

=== 2026–present: Formation and Bailar o Morir ===
Lali, Sergi and Gattas worked together as coaches on the fifth season of La Voz Argentina in 2025. During the program, they discussed songs they wanted to cover, initially considering recording an extended play of versions. The idea developed after they began meeting at Sergi's studio, where they worked with producer Mauro De Tommaso on arrangements and translations before turning to original material. Lali suggested covering "Adonde", a song by German band Cetu Javu, which became the album's only cover version.

The sessions produced fourteen compositions, from which the trio selected ten for their debut album. As the music developed, Lali and Gattas also worked on creating a visual identity that combined elements of their existing projects while establishing a separate personality. Gattas described BOM as a new character, likening it to a "three-headed monster" whose aesthetic and identity had to be developed independently.

BOM was publicly announced in October 2026 through a dedicated social media account. The group released its first single, "Bailar o Morir", on 27 October, accompanied by a short film directed by Lautaro Espósito and Ale Ruax. The album of the same name followed on 3 November through Sony Music Argentina.

== Artistry ==
=== Influences ===
The group's musical direction draws on the members' interest in italo disco, house music and electronic music from the 1980s. The trio described italo disco as a central reference from the project's earliest stages, seeking to adapt its vintage sounds to contemporary production and an Argentine musical identity. Their visual references included pop performers Madonna and David Bowie and filmmaker Pedro Almodóvar.

=== Musical style and themes ===
BOM's music combines dance-pop, italo disco and house, incorporating synthesizers, sequenced bass lines and rhythmic piano arrangements. The group's debut album also features elements of techno and disco music, alongside more conventional pop arrangements. The members described the repertoire as varied rather than restricted to a single genre.

The group's lyrics address love, desire, sexuality, nightlife and celebration, with dancing recurring as a central theme. The members have described the dance floor as a place of freedom, release and connection with others. Lali said that they wanted to make music that listeners would enjoy dancing to, while Sergi characterized the project as an extension of the group's shared aim of entertaining audiences rather than conveying a specific political message.

== Discography ==
=== Studio albums ===
List of studio albums with selected details
Title	Studio album details	Peaks
Title	Studio album details	ARG
Bailar o Morir	Released: 3 November 2026; Label: Sony Argentina; Formats: CD, LP, casette, digital download, streaming	1

=== Singles ===
List of singles
Title	Year	Peaks	Album
Title	Year	ARG	Album
"Bailar o Morir"	2026	10	Bailar o Morir
"En Italia"	2026	5	Bailar o Morir

=== Other charted songs ===
List of other charted songs
Title	Year	Peaks	Album
Title	Year	ARG	Album
"Señora"	2026	15	Bailar o Morir
"Migajas"	2026	14	Bailar o Morir
"Adonde"	2026	20	Bailar o Morir
"Hiperlove"	2026	46	Bailar o Morir
"Ganar"	2026	54	Bailar o Morir
"Piel"	2026	65	Bailar o Morir
"Helecho"	2026	62	Bailar o Morir
"Vivo del Pop"	2026	42	Bailar o Morir

== Tours ==
- Bailar o Morir Tour (2026–2027)
