= Hohe Warte (Karwendel) =

Mountain in the Karwendel in Tyrol

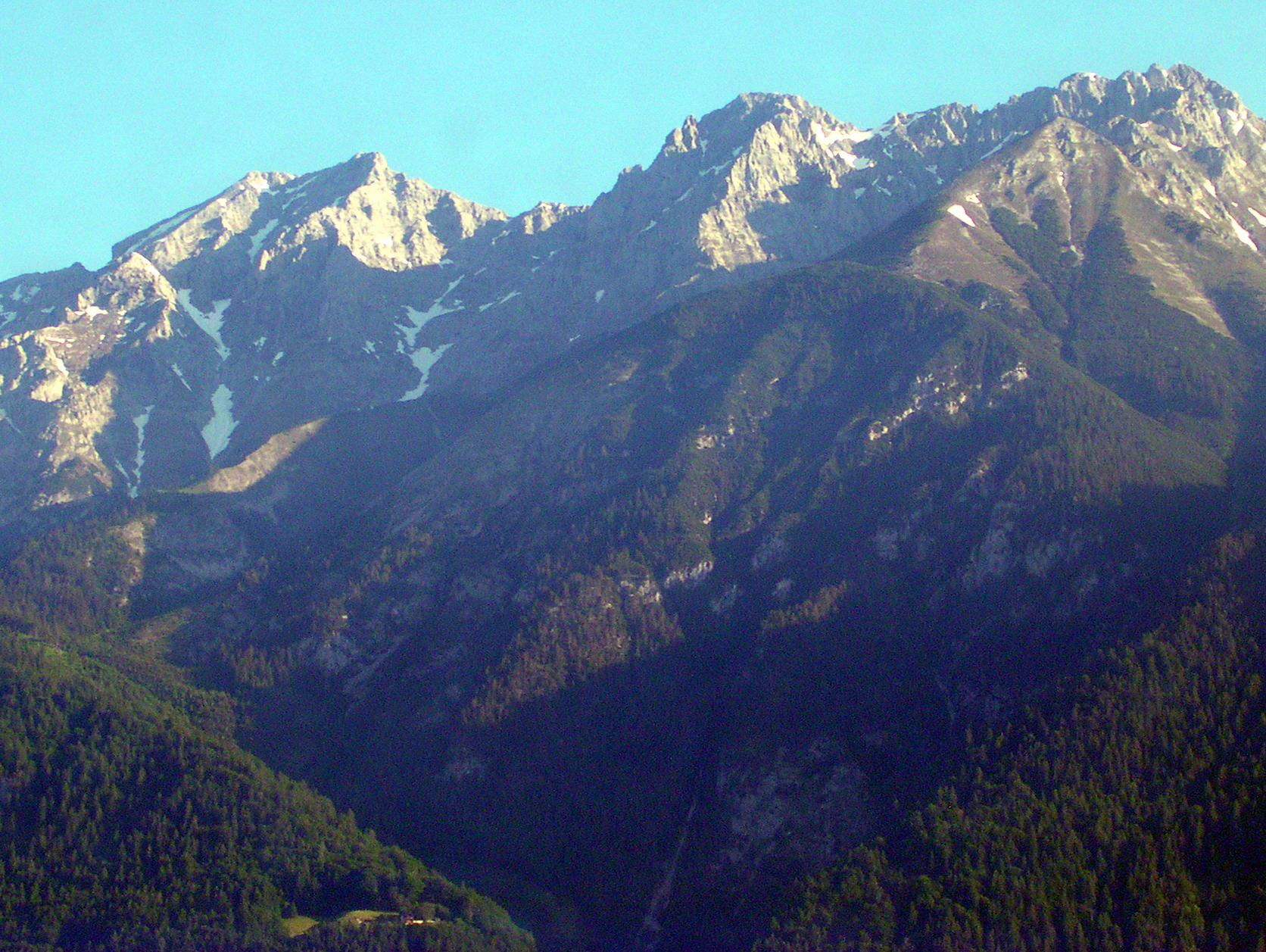
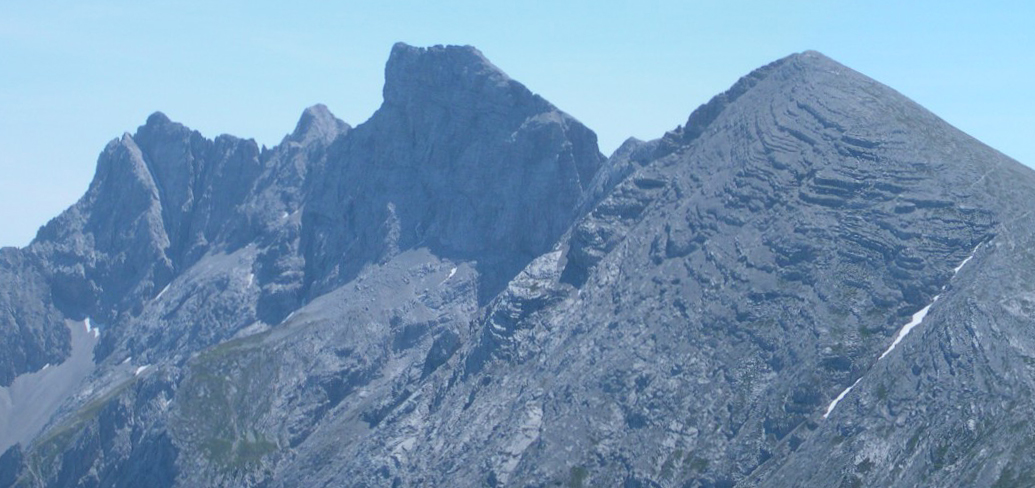
- The Hohe Warte with its prominent south arête in the centre. Left: the Kleiner Solstein. Right: the Hintere and Vordere Brandjochspitze. Seen from Innsbruck From the left: the Hintere Brandjochspitze, Hohe Warte, Kleiner Solstein and Großer Solstein

Highest point
- Elevation: 2,597 m (AA) (8,520 ft)
- Prominence: 77 m
- Isolation: 0.4 km → Hintere Brandjochspitze
- Coordinates: 47°18′06″N 11°20′02″E

Geography
- Location within Austria
- Location: Tyrol, Austria
- Parent range: Nordkette, Karwendel

Geology
- Rock age: Triassic
- Rock type: Wetterstein limestone

Climbing
- First ascent: 1870 by Hermann von Barth
- Normal route: Innsbruck - Seegrube or Aspach Hut - Gamswart Saddle - Hohe Warte

The Hohe Warte is a mountain, 2,597 m (AA) in height, in the Karwendel range in Austria. It is located between the Kleiner Solstein to the west and the Hintere Brandjochspitze to the east, in the Nordkette in the state of Tyrol, north of the Innsbruck quarter of Kranebitten and has a prominence of at least 77 metres.

== Access ==
The Hohe Warte was first climbed in 1870 by Hermann von Barth. The present normal route to the top runs from the Aspach Hut (1,534 m (AA)) above Innsbruck and poses no great difficulties. It runs through schrofen terrain up to the Gamswart Saddle, then for a short way along the western ridge to the summit. Another ascent runs up the south ridge and has a climbing grade of UIAA IV. Crossings to the Kleiner Solstein and Hintere Brandjochspitze are possible at grade III-.

== Literature and maps ==
- Walter Klier (2005), Alpenvereinsführer Karwendelgebirge alpin (in German) (15 ed.), Munich: Bergverlag Rother, ISBN 3763311211
- Alpine Club map 1:25,000, Sheet 5/1, Karwendelgebirge West
