= Washerwoman (disambiguation) =

Washerwoman or Washerwomen may refer to:

- Washerwoman, a laundress, i.e. a woman who takes in laundry. Both terms are now old-fashioned.
- Alternanthera caracasana, a plant
- Bean-nighe, or 'washerwoman'; a female spirit in Scottish folklore
- The Irish Washerwoman, a traditional Irish jig
- The Washerwomen (Les Blanchisseuses), an early film (1896) by Georges Méliès
- The Washer Woman, an outdoor sculpture in Mexico
- Washerwoman's sprain, a colloquial name for De Quervain syndrome, an injury of the thumb typically caused by repetitive action

== See also ==
- The Laundress (disambiguation)
- Launderette (disambiguation)
- Women (disambiguation)
- Woman (disambiguation)
- Washer (disambiguation)
