= Gigalitz =

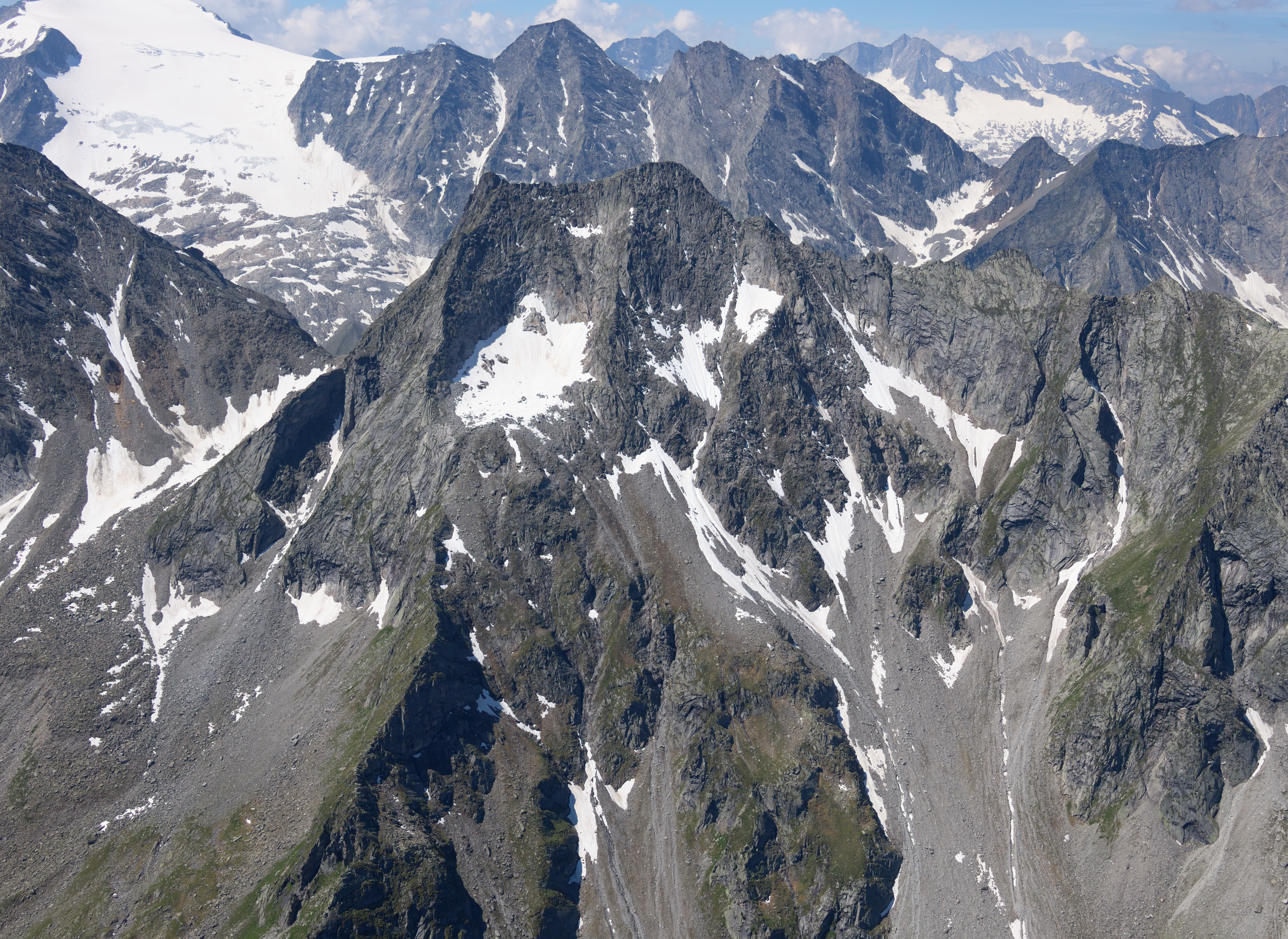
- Aerial view of Gigalitz from the northeast

Highest point
- Elevation: 3,001 m (AA) (9,846 ft)
- Prominence: 300 m ↓ Lapenscharte
- Isolation: 1.5 km → Greizer Spitze
- Listing: Alpine mountains above 3000 m
- Coordinates: 47°03′29″N 11°53′27″E

Geography
- Location within Austria
- Location: Tyrol, Austria
- Parent range: Zillertal Alps

Geology
- Rock type: Augen- und Flasergneis, Granitgneis

Climbing
- First ascent: 1884 Eugen Guido Lammer (touristic)
- Normal route: Southwest ridge from the Greizer Hut

The Gigalitz is a mountain, 3,001 m (AA), on the Floitenkamm ridge of the Zillertal Alps between the bottoms of Floitengrund and Stillupgrund. It is the Hausberg of the Greizer Hut.

== Ascent ==
From the Greizer Hut the path runs up to the col of Lapenscharte (crossing to the Kasseler Hut) to a signed fork at a height of about 2,500 m. It continues on an unmarked path to the unprominent southwestern arête and then on grassy schrofen to the two summits. On the north top there is a metal orientation rose. The journey time from the Greizer Hut is about 2.5 hours. (775 metres of height difference).

== Summit cross ==
In July 2006 a summit cross was funded and erected by the "FND" (Freitag nach Dienst = "Friday After Work") pub regulars (Stammtischrunde).

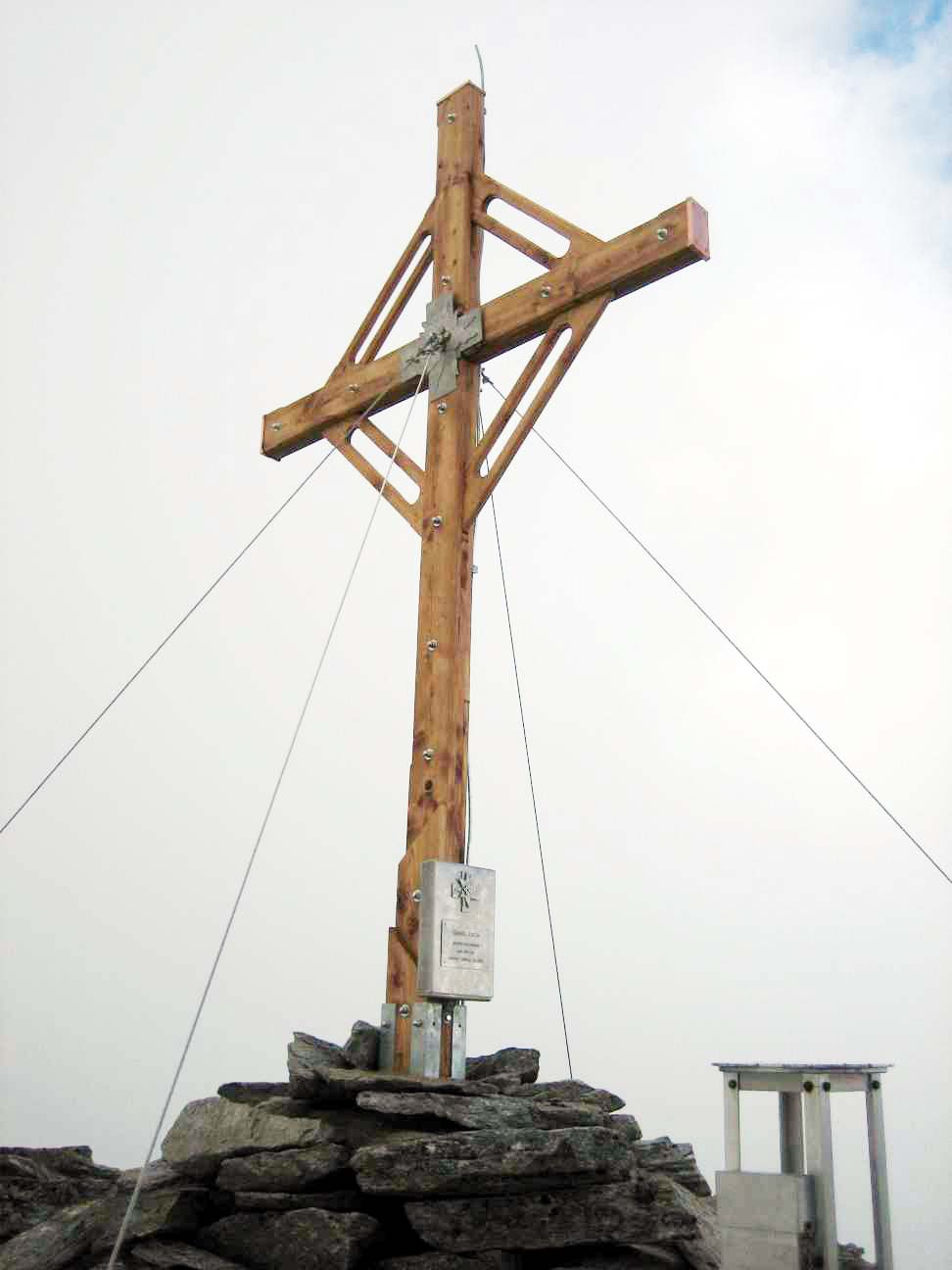
Summit cross on the Gigalitz

== Climbing tour ==
One of several climbing tours, with 7 rope lengths and UIAA grade 4+/5-, is laid out on the neighbouring Gigalitzturm rock tower (2,978 m). The start of this climb is on the Lapenscharte col.

== Literature ==
- Heinrich and Walter Klier: Zillertaler Alpen, Alpine Club Guide. Bergverlag Rudolf Rother, Munich, 1996, ISBN 3-7633-1269-2

== Map ==
- Alpine Club map 1:25,000 series, Sheet 35/2
