= Situations =

Situations may refer to:

- Situations (essay series), a 1947–1976 series of books by Jean-Paul Sartre
- "Situations" (song), by Cetu Javu, 1988
- Situations – The Very Best Of Cetu Javu, a 2009 album
- Situations, an EP by Escape the Fate, or the title song, 2007
- "Situations", a song by Keyshia Cole from The Way It Is, 2005

== See also ==
- Situation (disambiguation)
