= Por Favor =

Por Favor may refer to:

- Por Favor (album), by Brett Dennen, 2016
- "Por Favor" (song), by Pitbull and Fifth Harmony, 2017
- "Por Favor", a song by Cetu Javu, a B-side of the single "Help Me Now!", 1987
- Por favor, a Spanish term for please.
