= Hintere Brandjochspitze =

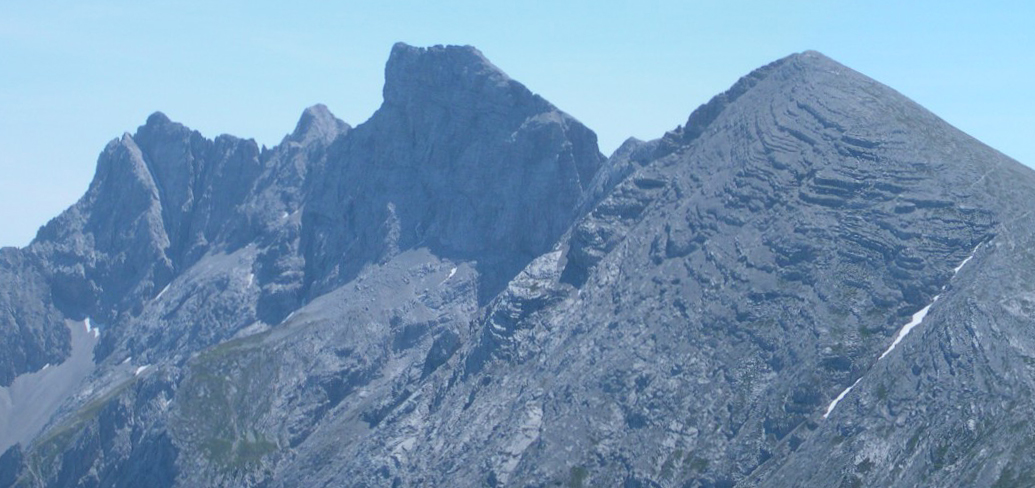
- Left: the Hintere Brandjochspitze; right: the Hohe Warte, Kleiner Solstein and Großer Solstein. Taken from the Reither Spitze (from the NNW)

Highest point
- Elevation: 2,599 m (AA) (8,527 ft)
- Coordinates: 47°18′11″N 11°20′21″E

Geography
- Location within Austria
- Location: Northwest of Innsbruck, Tyrol
- Parent range: Nordkette, Karwendel

Geology
- Rock age: Triassic
- Mountain type: Rock summit
- Rock type: Wetterstein limestone

Climbing
- First ascent: In 1870 by Hermann v. Barth
- Normal route: Short trackless climb from the Vorderen Brandjochspitze at climbing grade UIAA I

The Hintere Brandjochspitze (2,599 m (AA)) is a summit roughly 200 metres northwest of the Vordere Brandjochspitze in the Nordkette range above Innsbruck. It rises above its "forward" neighbour by around 40 metres.

The summit may be reached in 20 minutes from the Vordere Brandjochspitze at climbing grade UIAA I through a gully left of the arête. A more difficult route runs along the western arête (grade III-) from the Hohe Warte. Other routes along the northern Hippengrat (UIAA IV) from the Hippenspitze (2,388 m) and from the northwest (UIAA IV) are rarely used.

== Literature ==
- Klier, Heinrich; März, Fritz (1978), Alpine Club Guide Karwendelgebirge (in German) (11 ed.), Munich: Bergverlag Rudolf Rother, ISBN 3-7633-1208-0 (Hippengrat, northwest route)
- Klier, Walter (1996), Alpine Club Guide Karwendel alpin (in German) (14 ed.), Munich: Bergverlag Rudolf Rother, ISBN 3-7633-1121-1 (normal route, west arête)
