= Woman (disambiguation) =

A woman is an adult female human.

Woman, A Woman, or The Woman may also refer to:

== Film and television ==
- Woman (1918 film), an American silent film directed by Maurice Tourneur
- Woman (1948 film), a Japanese film by Keisuke Kinoshita
- Woman (1968 film), a three-part South Korean film
- Woman (2019 film), a French documentary
- Woman (Japanese TV series), a 2013 television drama
- Aurat (1940 film) or Woman, a 1940 Indian film by Mehboob Khan, remade in 1957 as Mother India
- A Woman (1915 film), an American silent film by Charlie Chaplin
- A Woman (2010 film), an American-Italian drama by Giada Colagrande
- The Woman (1915 film), an American drama silent film directed by George Melford
- The Woman (2011 film), an American horror film directed by Lucky McKee

== Literature ==
- Woman (Australian magazine), a women's magazine 1934–1954
- Woman (UK magazine), a women's weekly magazine since 1937
- The Woman (novel), a 2010 novel by Jack Ketchum and Lucky McKee
- Irene Adler, a female love interest referred to as "The Woman" by Sherlock Holmes and his related fan community.

== Music ==
=== Albums ===
- Woman (BoA album) or the title song, 2018
- Woman (Burt Bacharach album) or the title song, 1979
- Woman, by Himiko Kikuchi, 1983
- Woman (Jill Scott album), 2015
- Woman (Jon Stevens album) or the title song, 2015
- Woman (Justice album), 2016
- Woman (Mike McGear album) or the title song, 1972
- Woman (Nancy Sinatra album), 1972
- Woman (Rhye album) or the title song, 2013
- Woman, by Syleena Johnson, 2020
- Woman, by Wallis Bird, 2019
- A Woman (Margo Smith album), 1979
- A Woman (Qveen Herby album) or the title song, 2021

=== Songs ===
- "Woman" (Cat Power song), 2018
- "Woman" (Doja Cat song), 2021
- "Woman" (John Lennon song), 1980
- "Woman" (Kane Brown song), 2026
- "Woman" (Kesha song), 2017
- "Woman" (Little Simz song), 2021
- "Woman" (Mumford & Sons song), 2019
- "Woman" (Neneh Cherry song), 1996
- "Woman" (Paul McCartney song), released by Peter and Gordon, 1966
- "Woman" (Wolfmother song), 2005
- "Woman (Sensuous Woman)", by Don Gibson, 1972
- "Woman", by Anti-Nowhere League from We Are...The League, 1982
- "Woman", by City and Colour from If I Should Go Before You, 2015
- "Woman", by Delta Goodrem from Delta, 2007
- "Woman", by Ellie Goulding from Brightest Blue, 2020
- "W-o-m-a-n", by Etta James, 1955
- "Woman", by Foxes from Friends in the Corner, 2021
- "Woman", by Free from Free, 1969
- "Woman", by Harry Styles from Harry Styles, 2017
- "Woman", by James Gang from James Gang Rides Again, 1970
- "Woman", by Klaatu, 1988
- "Woman", by Level 42 from The Early Tapes, 1982
- "Woman", by Tina Arena from Just Me, 2001
- "Woman", by Zager & Evans from 2525 (Exordium & Terminus), 1969
- "A Woman", by Tory Lanez from Daystar, 2020
- "The Woman", by Aretha Franklin from A Rose Is Still a Rose, 1998
- "Woman, Woman, Woman", by Kevin Coyne from Dynamite Daze, 1978

== Theatre ==
- The Woman, a political drama by William C. deMille, 1911

== Religion ==
- Mary, mother of Jesus, addressed as woman by Jesus in John 19:26
- Woman of the Apocalypse, a character in the Book of Revelation

== Other uses ==
- Woman (wrestler), ring name of Nancy Benoit, American professional wrestling valet and wife of Chris Benoit
- The Woman series, paintings by Willem de Kooning
- WoMan, a GNU Emacs man pages browser

== See also ==
- Donna (disambiguation)
- Femme (disambiguation)
- Frau (disambiguation)
- Mujer (disambiguation) (Spanish for "Woman")
- Women (disambiguation)
- Womyn, an alternate spelling for woman
