= Frau (disambiguation) =

Frau is a German honorific for women.

Frau may also refer to:

- Frau (band), an English all-female hardcore punk band
- Frau Antje, a Dutch advertising character marketed to German audiences
- Frau Ava, the first named female writer in any genre in the German language
- Frau Ella, a 2013 German comedy film
- Frau Engel, a character from the Wolfenstein video game series
- Frau Eva, a 1916 German silent drama film
- Frau Farbissina, a character from the Austin Powers film series
- Frau Faust, a Japanese manga series written and illustrated by Kore Yamazakia
- Frau Hitt, a peak within the southernmost mountain chain of the Karwendel in Austria
- Frau Holle, a German fairy tale
- Frau-Holle-Teich, a pond in Hoher Meißner, Werra-Meißner-Kreis, Hesse, Germany
- Frau im Spiegel, a German weekly magazine for women
- Frau Jenny Treibel, a 1892 German novel published by Theodor Fontane
- Frau Margot, a 2007 opera by composer Thomas Pasatieri.
- Frau Minne, a personification of courtly love in Middle High German literature
- Frâu River, a tributary of the Someşul Mare River
- Frau Sorge, a 1887 novel by Hermann Sudermann
- Frau Sixta, a 1925 novel by Ernst Zahn
- Frau Trude, the German name for Mother Trudy, a fairy tale collected by the Brothers Grimm
- Die Frau ohne Schatten, a 1919 opera by Richard Strauss
- Die schweigsame Frau, a 1935 opera by Richard Strauss
- Poltrona Frau, Italian furniture manufacturing company
- Wildi Frau, a mountain of the Bernese Alps
- The Men of Frau Clarissa, a 1922 German silent film

== See also ==
- Frau (surname)
- Fräulein, a specific German honorific for unmarried women
- Fraus, the goddess or personification of treachery and fraud in Roman mythology
- Fraus (genus), a genus of moths of the family Hepialidae.
