= Kleiner Solstein =

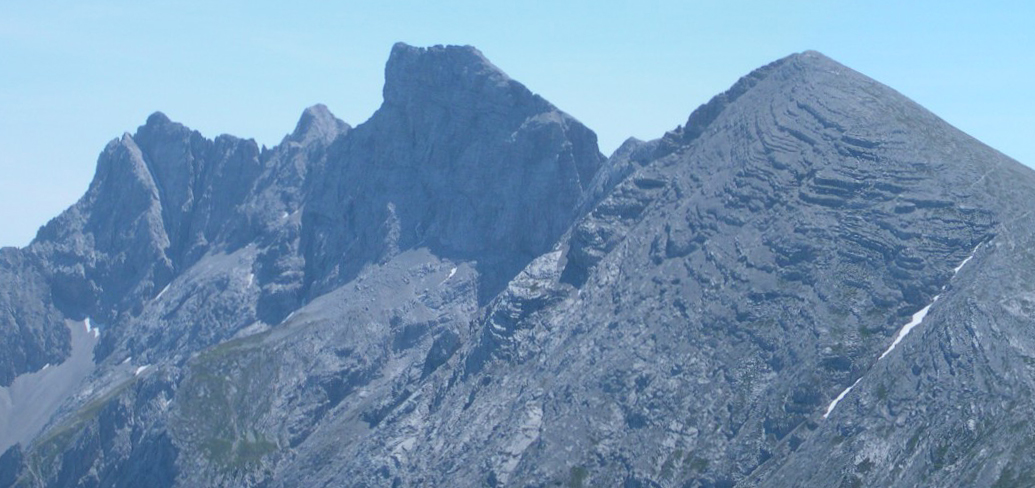
- Left to right: Hintere Brandjochspitze, Hohe Warte, Kleiner Solstein, Großer Solstein. Taken from the Reither Spitze (from west-northwest)

Highest point
- Elevation: 2,637 m (AA) (8,652 ft)
- Prominence: 2,637-2,121 m ↓ Kreuzjöchl
- Isolation: 8.0 km → Western Praxmarerkarspitze
- Listing: Highest peak in the Nordkette
- Coordinates: 47°18′07″N 11°19′27″E

Geography
- Location within Austria
- Location: Tyrol, Austria
- Parent range: Nordkette, Karwendel

Geology
- Rock age: Triassic
- Rock type: Wetterstein Limestone

Climbing
- First ascent: 1867 by Pock, Wechner, Angermaier
- Normal route: Ascent from the west

The Kleiner Solstein is a mountain, 2,637 m (AA) high, in the Nordkette in the Karwendel Alps in the Austrian state of Tyrol. Despite its name ("Small Solstein") it towers above its western neighbour, the Großer Solstein ("Great Solstein") (2,541 m (AA)) by almost 100 m (330 ft) and is thus the highest summit in the Nordkette. The southern side of the Kleiner Solstein facing the Inn valley is characterised by schrofen and steep-sided cirques. To the north it plummets in a rock face up to 600 m (2,000 ft) high towards the valley of Großkristental, which runs from the Gleirsch valley in a southwesterly direction to the Erl Saddle.

== Ascent ==
The normal route to the Kleiner Solstein runs from the saddle between the Großer and Kleiner Solstein, initially crossing a small ridge of rock (Felsrippe) then over schrofen from the south to the flat summit ridge following a waymarked route to the top. The route to the saddle between the two peaks may be reached either from the Solsteinhaus and the Großer Solstein or on two paths from the south from the Neue Magdeburger Hut.

The crossing from the Hohe Warte to the east from the Gamswart Saddle has a climbing grade of UIAA III- and runs directly along the initially extremely sharp eastern arête. There are several difficult climbing routes up the north face.

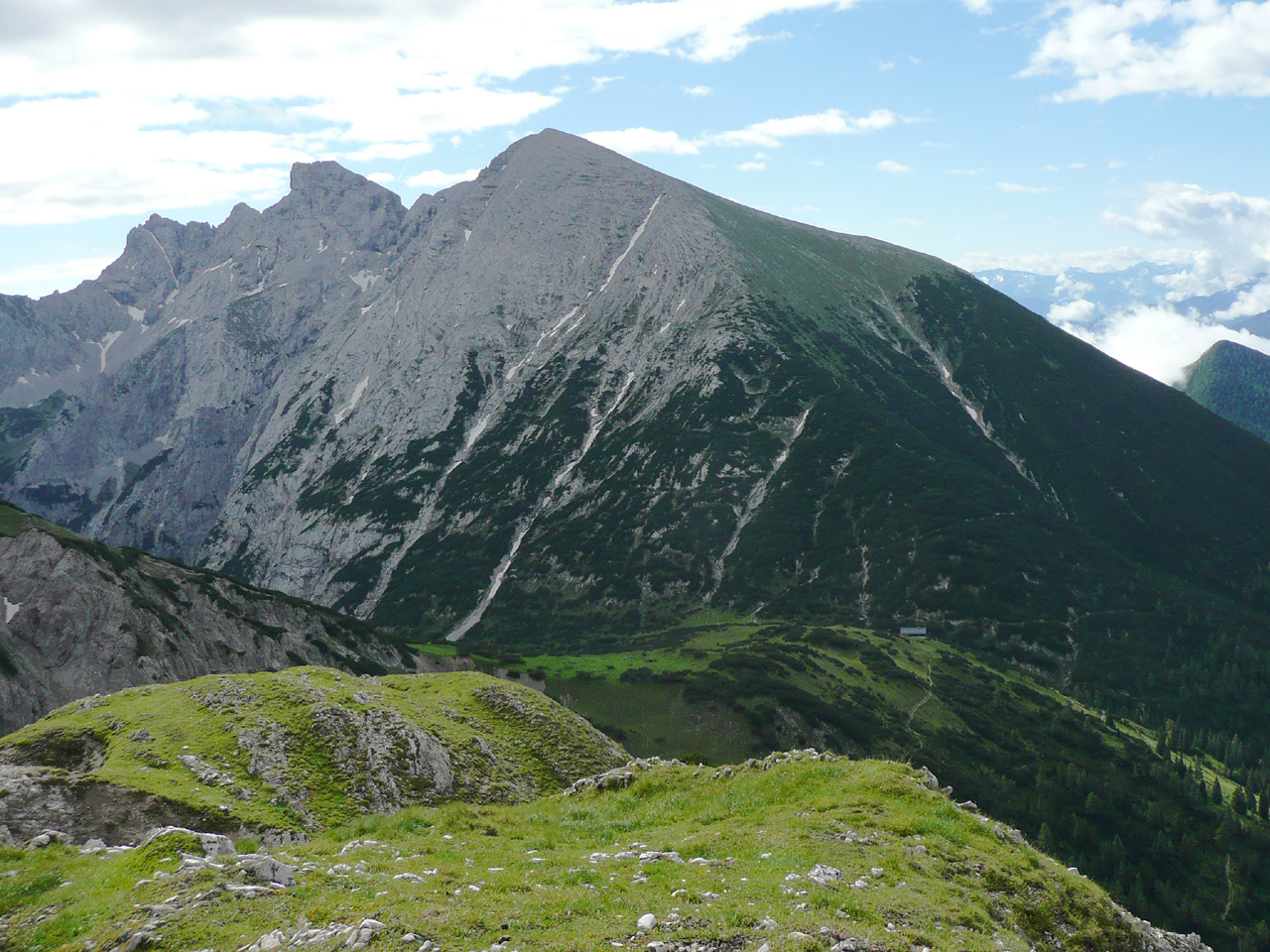
Kleiner (left) + Großer (right) Solstein with the Solsteinhaus from the NW

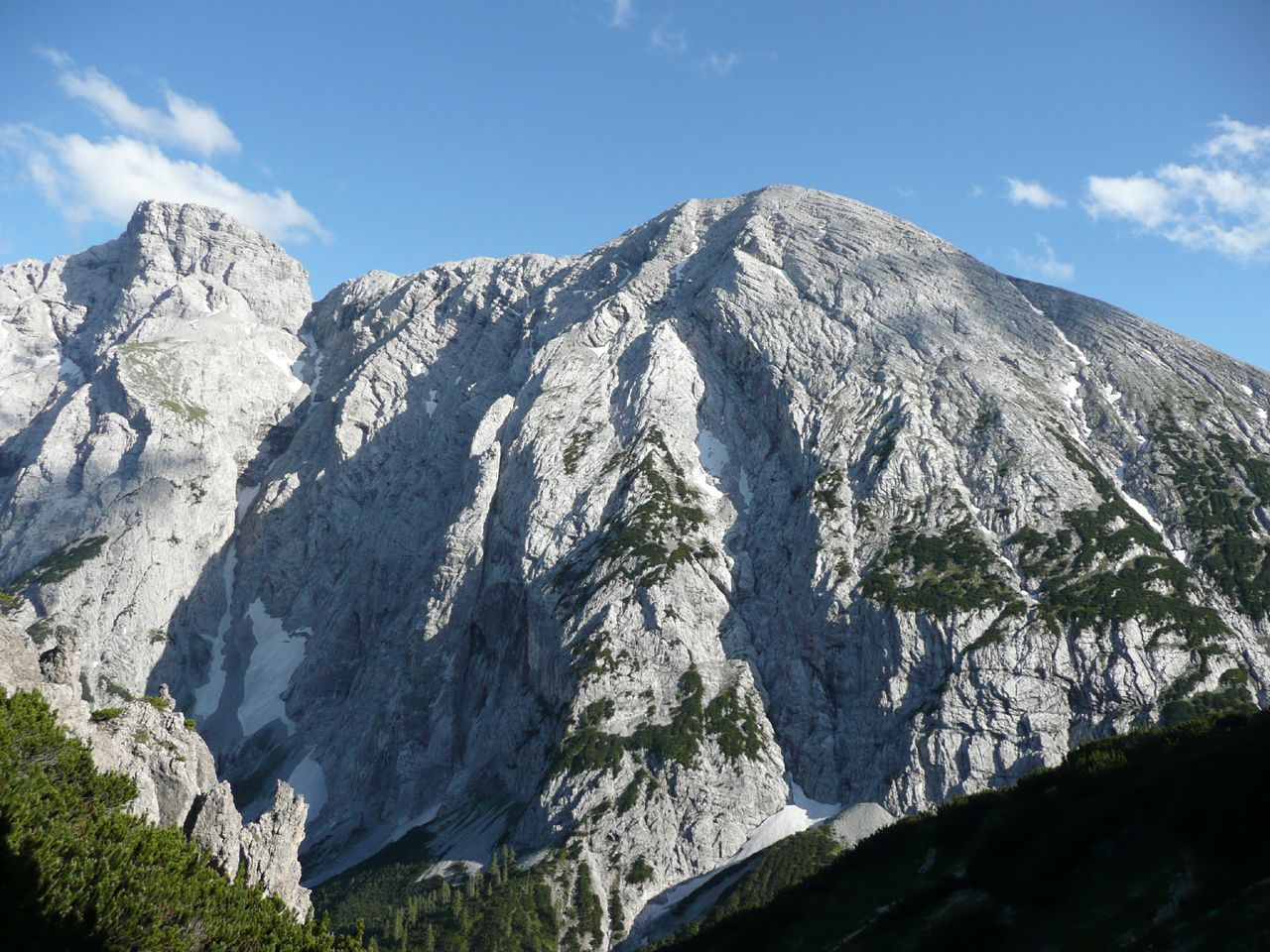
Kleiner (left) + Großer (right) Solstein from the N

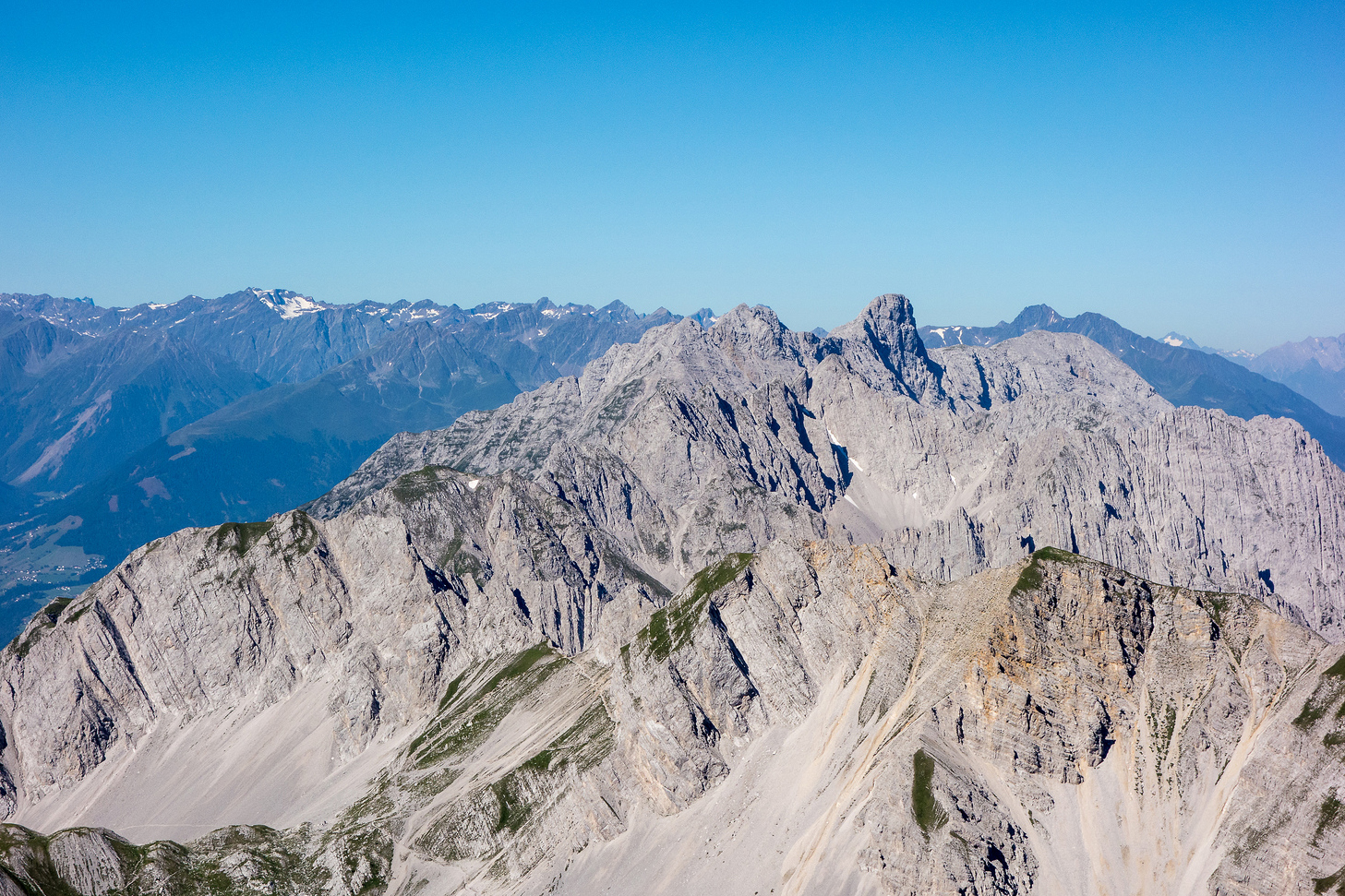
View of the Nordkette from the Stempeljochspitze. The Kleiner Solstein can be seen rising prominently

== Literature ==
- Klier, Walter (1996), Alpenvereinsführer Karwendel alpin (in German) (14 ed.), München: Bergverlag Rudolf Rother, ISBN 3763311211
