= Help Me Now! =

Single by Cetu Javu
- B-side: "Por Favor"
- Released: 1987
- Recorded: Sorst Studio
- Genre: Synth-pop
- Length: 3:59
- Label: Deme – DEM 215.501 S1 (7"), DEM 215.502 M1 (12" Ltd.)
- Songwriter(s): Chris Demere
- Producer(s): Cetu Javu; Manfred Wieczorke

Cetu Javu singles chronology
"Help Me Now!" (1987)	"Situations" (1988)

"Help Me Now!" is the debut single of German synth-pop group Cetu Javu. The single was released on Deme Records, a record label set up by the band for their first release. It was a limited release, with 500 copies of the 7" vinyl and 1000 copies of the 12" vinyl. "Help Me Now!" and its B-side "Por Favor" never appeared on any subsequent releases.

== Track listings ==
=== 7" Limited Edition vinyl ===
- GER: Deme Records DEM 215.501 S1

Side one
No.	Title	Writer(s)	Length
1.	"Help Me Now!" (7" version)	Chris Demere	3:59

Side two
No.	Title	Writer(s)	Length
1.	"Por Favor"	Chris Demere	3:28

=== 12" Limited Edition vinyl ===
- GER: Deme Records DEM 215.502 M1

Side one
No.	Title	Writer(s)	Length
1.	"Help Me Now!" (12" version)	Chris Demere	6:20

Side two
No.	Title	Writer(s)	Length
1.	"Por Favor"	Chris Demere	4:04
2.	"Help Me Now! (Minimal)"	Chris Demere	3:02
