= Laundromat (disambiguation) =

A laundromat (laundrette) is a self-service laundry facility.

Laundromat may also refer to:

- Laundry machines at self-service laundries
- The Laundromat Project, a community self-service laundry project in New York City
- "Laundromat", a Westinghouse trademark; see List of generic and genericized trademarks
- Money laundering schemes
  - Russian Laundromat aka "The Laundromat", a 2010s money laundering scheme
  - Azerbaijani laundromat, a 2010s money laundering scheme
- The Laundromat Cafe, a chain of Scandinavian cafes
- The Laundromat (1985 film), a 1985 American television film
- The Laundromat (2019 film), a 2019 American film
- "Laundromat" (song), a 2003 single and 2001 song by Nivea off her eponymous debut album Nivea
- "Laundromat", a 1971 song by Rory Gallagher off his eponymous debut album Rory Gallagher
- "The Laundromat", a 1997 song by the Jerky Boys off the album The Jerky Boys 4

== See also ==
- American Laundromat Records, a U.S. record label
- Launderette (disambiguation)
- Laundry
