= The Laundress =

The Laundress may refer to:

- The Laundress (Chardin), a painting
- The Laundress (Daumier), a painting
- The Laundress (Greuze), a painting
- The Laundress (Toulouse-Lautrec), a painting
- Laundress, another word for a washerwoman, i.e. someone whose occupation is doing laundry
- The Laundress, a character in The Muppet Christmas Carol

== See also ==
- The Launderettes, Norwegian rock band
- Launderette (disambiguation)
- Washerwoman (disambiguation)
