= Women (disambiguation) =

Women is the plural of woman, an adult female human.

Women or The Women may also refer to:

== Literature ==
- Women (Bukowski novel), a 1978 novel by Charles Bukowski
- Women (Sebastian novel), a 1933 novel by Mihail Sebastian
- Women, the second book in the Mothers and Daughters comic book series by Dave Sim
- The Women (Boyle novel), a 2009 novel by T.C. Boyle
- The Women (Hannah novel), a 2024 novel by Kristin Hannah
- The Women, a 1996 book by Hilton Als
- Women (Sollers novel)
- The Women (play), written by Clare Boothe Luce and first staged in December 1936

== Film and television ==
- Women (1934), a Chinese drama film directed by Shi Dongshan
- The Women (1939 film), an American comedy-drama directed by George Cukor, based on the play by Clare Booth Luce (see above)
- The Women (1955), a TV episode of Producers' Showcase, starring Shelley Winters
- The Opposite Sex (1956), a film musical adaptation of the play The Women by Clare Booth Luce (see above)
- Women (1966 film), a Russian film
- Women (1977 film), a Hungarian film
- Women (1985 film), a Hong Kong drama directed by Stanley Kwan
- Women (1997 film), an internationally co-produced drama
- Women – for America, for the World, a 1986 short documentary
- The Women (2008 film), an update of the 1936 Clare Boothe Luce play and 1939 film, written and directed by Diane English
- Women: Stories of Passion, an American television series
- Vous les femmmes (TV series), a French comedy show, translated as WOMEN! on British television
- The Heart of Woman, a Taiwanese television series, also known as Women

== Music ==
- "Women" (Def Leppard song), 1987
- "Women" (Foreigner song), 1979
- "Women" (Lou Reed song), 1982
- "Women" (Amanda Lear song), 1985
- Women (band), a Calgary indie rock band
  - Women (album), their 2008 debut
- Women (Make You Feel Alright), song by the Easybeats, 1966

== Other uses ==
- An-Nisa ("Women"), the fourth chapter of the Qur'an
- Women Management, modeling agency

== See also ==
- Mujeres (disambiguation) (Spanish for "Women")
- Woman (disambiguation)
