= Mujer =

Mujer (Spanish for "woman"), La Mujer ("the woman") or Una Mujer ("a woman") may refer to:

== Film and television ==
- Mujer (film), a 1947 Mexican film directed by Chano Urueta
- Una Mujer, a 1975 Argentine film starring Cipe Lincovsky
- Una mujer (1965 TV series), broadcast by Telesistema Mexicano
- Una mujer (1978 TV series), broadcast by Televisa
- Una mujer, a 1991 telenovela broadcast by Ecuavisa
- Mujer, a 1970 Argentine TV series starring Tito Alonso

== Music ==
- Mujer (album), a 1993 album by Marta Sánchez
- "Mujer", a 2025 song by Ricardo Arjona
- La Mujer, a 1989 album by Shirley Bassey
- Una Mujer (album), a 2003 album by Myriam
- Una Mujer, an album by Olga Tañón
- "Una Mujer", a song by Cetu Javu from the album Where Is Where
- "Una Mujer", the Spanish version of Christina Agulilera's "What a Girl Wants"

== See also ==
- Mujeres (disambiguation)
