= Nordkette =

Mountain in Austria

Nordkette also North Chain / Northern Range Inntalkette / Nordkette im Karwendel
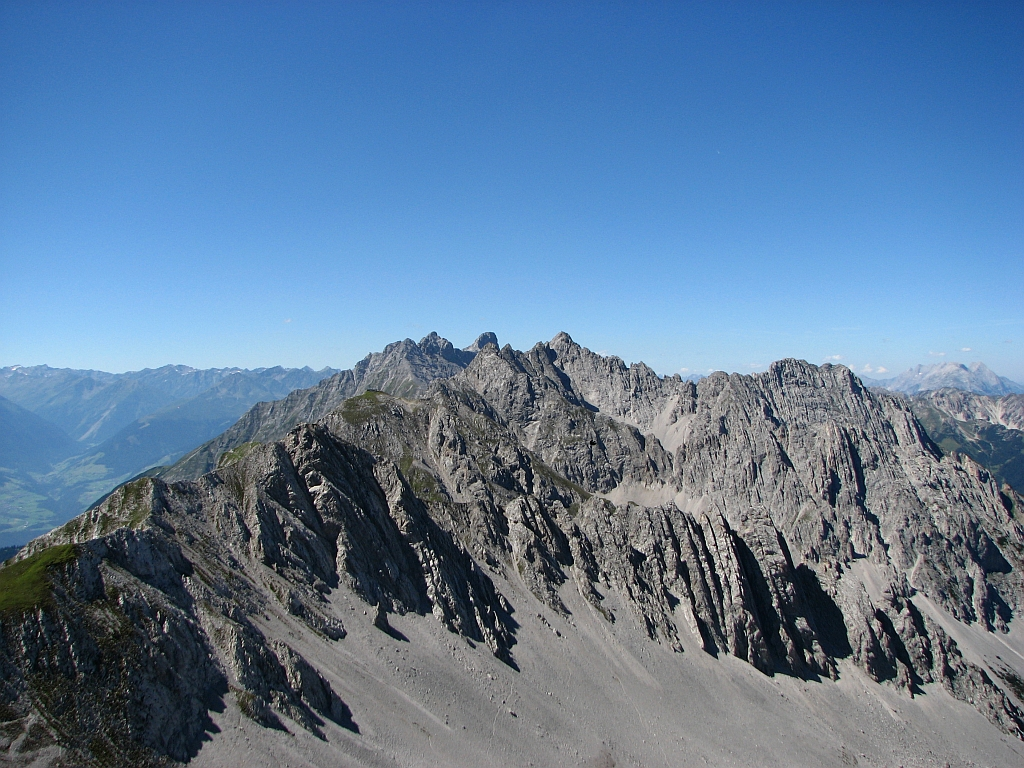
- The North Chain seen from the Mandlspitze, looking west

Highest point
- Peak: Kleiner Solstein
- Elevation: 2,637 m above sea level (AA)

Geography
- Location within Alps
- Location: Tyrol, Austria
- Range coordinates: 47°18′00″N 11°21′00″E

The Nordkette, also variously called the North Chain, Northern Range, rarely the Inn Valley Range or Inn Valley Chain (Inntalkette), is a range of mountains just north of the city of Innsbruck in Austria. It is the southernmost of the four great mountain chains in the Karwendel. To the west it is linked by the Erl Saddle to the Erlspitze Group, to the east via the Stempeljoch saddle (2,215 m (AA)) to the Gleirsch-Halltal Range. To the south it is bounded by the Inn valley. Its highest summit is the Kleiner Solstein (2,637 m (AA)) in the west of the range.

The Nordkette is served by the Nordkette Cable Car, which offers easy access to the ski area and the Innsbruck Klettersteig. The latter starts in the east, near Hafelekar station (2,269 m (AA)) on the Nordkette Cable Car, and runs via the Seegrubenspitze, the Kemacher and the Langen Sattel to Frau Hitt and the Frau Hitt Saddle in the west. In addition, the Goethe Way (Goetheweg) runs from Hafelekar Station along the arête eastwards to the Pfeis Hut north of the Rumer Spitze. Below the Hungerburg - Seegrube section of the Nordkette Cableway runs the Nordkette Singletrail, one of the most challenging routes in Europe for freeride mountain bikers.

The following Alpine Club huts in the area of the Nordkette offer climbers bases for multi-day tours taking in numerous summits: the Solsteinhaus, the Neue Magdeburger Hut, the Pfeis Hut and the Bettelwurf Hut (in the Gleirsch-Halltal Range).

In the southwest, there is a small massif in front of the Nordkette, the Hechenberg, which reaches a height of 1,943 m (AA) at the Kirchbergköpfl and which is separated from the Nordkette to the northeast and east by the Kranebitter Klamm.

== Important summits ==
The most important summits of the Nordkette from west to east are the:

- Großer Solstein (2,541 m (AA))
- Kleiner Solstein (2,637 m (AA))
- Hohe Warte (2,597 m (AA))
- Hintere Brandjochspitze (2,599 m (AA))
- Vordere Brandjochspitze (2,559 m (AA))
- Hippenspitze (2,388 m (AA))
- Brandjochkreuz (2,268 m (AA))
- Frau Hitt (2,270 m (AA))
- Westliche Sattelspitze (2,339 m (AA))
- Kemacher (2,480 m (AA))
- Kumpfkarspitze (2,393 m (AA))
- Seegrubenspitze (2,350 m (AA))
- Hafelekarspitze (2,334 m (AA))
- Gleirschspitze (2,317 m (AA))
- Mandlspitze (2,366 m (AA))
- Gleirschtaler Brandjoch (2,372 m (AA))
- Rumer Spitze (2,454 m (AA))
- Thaurer Jochspitze (2,306 m (AA))
- Pfeiser Spitze (2,347 m (AA))
- Lattenspitze (2,330 m (AA))
- Wildangerspitze (2,153 m (AA))
- Thaurer Zunterkopf (1,918 m (AA))
- Haller Zunterkopf (1,966 m (AA))
- Hochmahdkopf (1,738 m (AA))
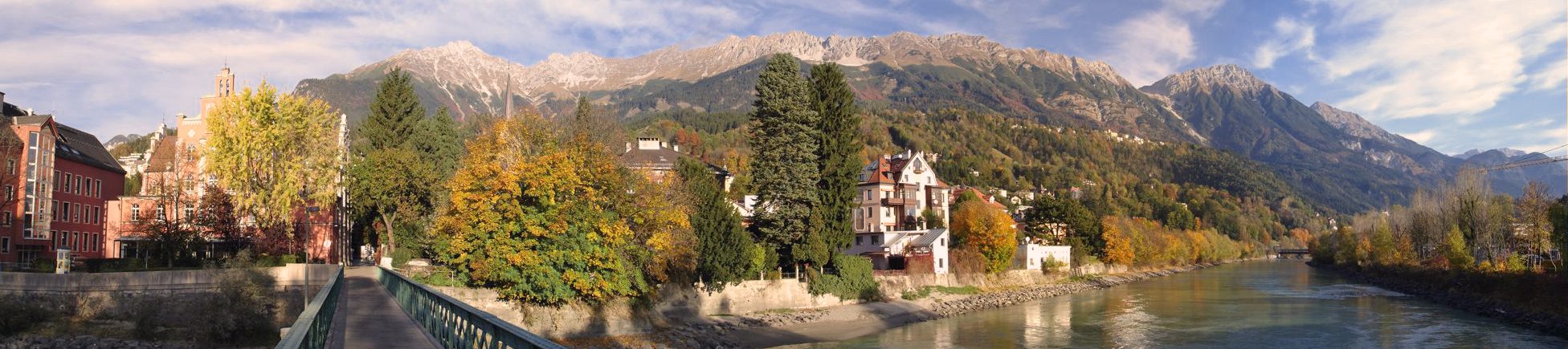
Panoramic view from Innsbruck (Emile Béthouart Steg) of the North Chain
