= Launderette (disambiguation) =

A launderette (laundromat) is a self-service laundry facility.

Launderette or laundrette or variation, may also refer to:

- Laundry machines at self-service laundries
- The Launderettes, a Norwegian rock band
- "Launderette" (1981 song), a 1981 single from the album Dirty Washing by Vivien Goldman
- "Launderette" (1999 song), a 1999 song by Bongshang from the album Vy-lo-fone
- The Laundrette (record), a record released from New Yorkshire
- "Laundrette" (episode), a 2012 episode of South Korean TV sketch comedy Gag Concert
- "Launderette" (advertisement), the name of an advertising campaign for Levi Strauss & Co. from 1985 for 501 jeans, created by ad firm Bartle Bogle Hegarty
- Bendix Launderette, a Bendix-made Telecoin-adapted laundry machine used at coin laundries, which became a genericized trademark

== See also ==
- Gunfight at the O.K. Laundrette (episode), a 1979 British TV episode for Minder
- My Beautiful Laundrette (film), a 1985 British film
- Laundrywoman
- Laundress
- Washerwoman (disambiguation)
- The Laundress (disambiguation)
- Laundromat (disambiguation)
- Laundry
