= Kemacher =

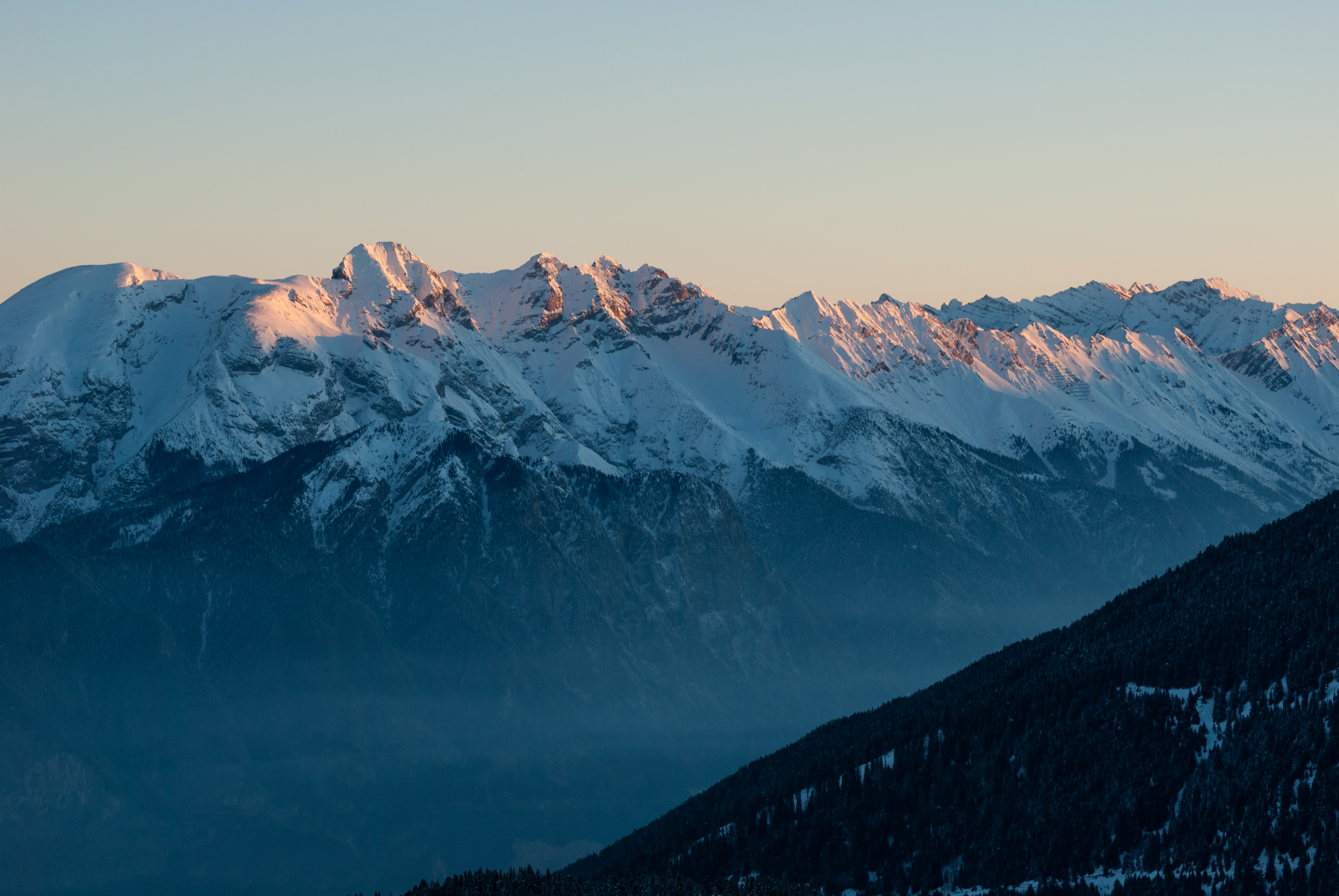
- Kemacher in the Nordkette (North Chain), first summit to the right of the middle of the picture

Highest point
- Elevation: 2,480 m (8,140 ft)
- Coordinates: 47°18′46″N 11°21′59″E

Geography
- Location within Austria
- Location: Tyrol, Austria
- Parent range: Alps, Karwendel

Climbing
- Easiest route: rock climb

Kemacher is a summit of the Nordkette (North Chain) range in the Austrian state of Tyrol.

== Climbing ==
The Kemacher is the highest peak of the Innsbruck Via Ferrata and is typically reached from the top station of the Innsbruck Nordkettenbahn (North Chain Cable Car) at the Hafelekar in about 2.5 hours.
