= Where Is Where =

Studio album by Cetu Javu
- Released: 1992
- Recorded: 1990–1992
- Genre: Synth-pop
- Label: Blanco y Negro
- Producer: Cetu Javu

Cetu Javu chronology
Southern Lands (1990)	Where Is Where (1992)	Tiempo De Remixes (1994)

Singles from Where Is Where
- 1. "Por Que?" Released: 1991; 2. "Dáme Tu Mano" Released: 1992; 3. "Una Mujer" Released: 1993; 4. "Tiempo" Released: 1994

Where Is Where is the second album by Cetu Javu, released in 1992.

== Release ==
The song "Por Que?" was released in 1991 as the first single taken from Where Is Where. The second single, "Dáme Tu Mano", released in 1992, while the third, "Tiempo", released in 1994.

== Track listing ==
All songs written by Cetu Javu.

=== CD: MXCD-325 ===
1. "Dáme Tu Mano" – 3:53
2. "Where" – 5:01
3. "Un Día Normal" – 5:04
4. "News" – 4:20
5. "Tiempo" – 4:22
6. "Caribbean Dream" – 4:16
7. "Sometimes" – 4:30
8. "Una Mujer" – 4:42
9. "Another Step" – 4:53
10. "Segregation" – 3:46
11. "Time" - 4:23
12. "Por Que?" - 4:07

=== LP: MXLP-325 ===
==== Side one ====
1. "Dáme Tu Mano" – 3:53
2. "Where" – 5:01
3. "Un Día Normal" – 5:04
4. "News" – 4:20
5. "Tiempo" – 4:22
6. "Caribbean Dream" - 4:16

==== Side two ====
1. "Sometimes" – 4:30
2. "Una Mujer" – 4:42
3. "Another Step" – 4:53
4. "Segregation" – 3:46
5. "Time" – 4:23
6. "Por Que?" - 4:07

=== CS: CAS-325 ===
==== Side one ====
1. "Dáme Tu Mano" – 3:53
2. "Where" – 5:01
3. "Un Día Normal" – 5:04
4. "News" – 4:20
5. "Tiempo" – 4:22

==== Side two ====
1. "Caribbean Dream" – 4:16
2. "Sometimes" – 4:30
3. "Una Mujer" – 4:42
4. "Another Step" – 4:53
5. "Segregation" – 3:46

== Personnel ==
=== Musicians ===
- Javier Revilla-Diez: lead vocals and backing vocals
- Chris Demere: synthesizers and drum machine
- Torsten Engelke: synthesizers
- Thorsten Kraass: synthesizers

=== Production ===
- Recorded and mixed at Hansa Tonstudio, Berlin, Tritonus Studio, Berlin
- Produced by Cetu Javu
- Engineered by Marc Karpinski
- Executive production: Modermusic
- Management: Modermusic
