= Frau (surname) =

Frau is a surname from the Catalan language, originating on Mallorca where it was a noble name from the end of the 13th century. Notable people with the surname include:

- Alessandro Frau (born 1977), Italian footballer
- Maria Frau (born 1930), Italian actress
- Pierre-Alain Frau (born 1980), French footballer
