= Mujeres =

Mujeres (Spanish for "Women") may refer to:

- Isla Mujeres (municipality), in the state of Quintana Roo, northeast of Cancun, Mexico
  - Isla Mujeres, an island in the Caribbean Sea, off the Yucatán Peninsula
    - Isla Mujeres, town on the island, seat or capital of the municipality
- Mujeres (TV series), a Spanish dramedy television series

== Music ==
- "Mujeres" (Fanny Lu song), 2013
- "Mujeres" (Mozart La Para song), 2018
- "Mujeres" (Ricardo Arjona song), 1992
- "Mujeres", a 2008 song by Alexander Acha
- "Mujeres", a 2020 song by Julieta Venegas
- Mujeres, album by Coque Malla
- Mujeres, album by Estrella Morente
- Mujeres, album by Silvio Rodríguez

== See also ==
- Mujer (disambiguation)
