= Eugen Guido Lammer =

Austrian mountaineer

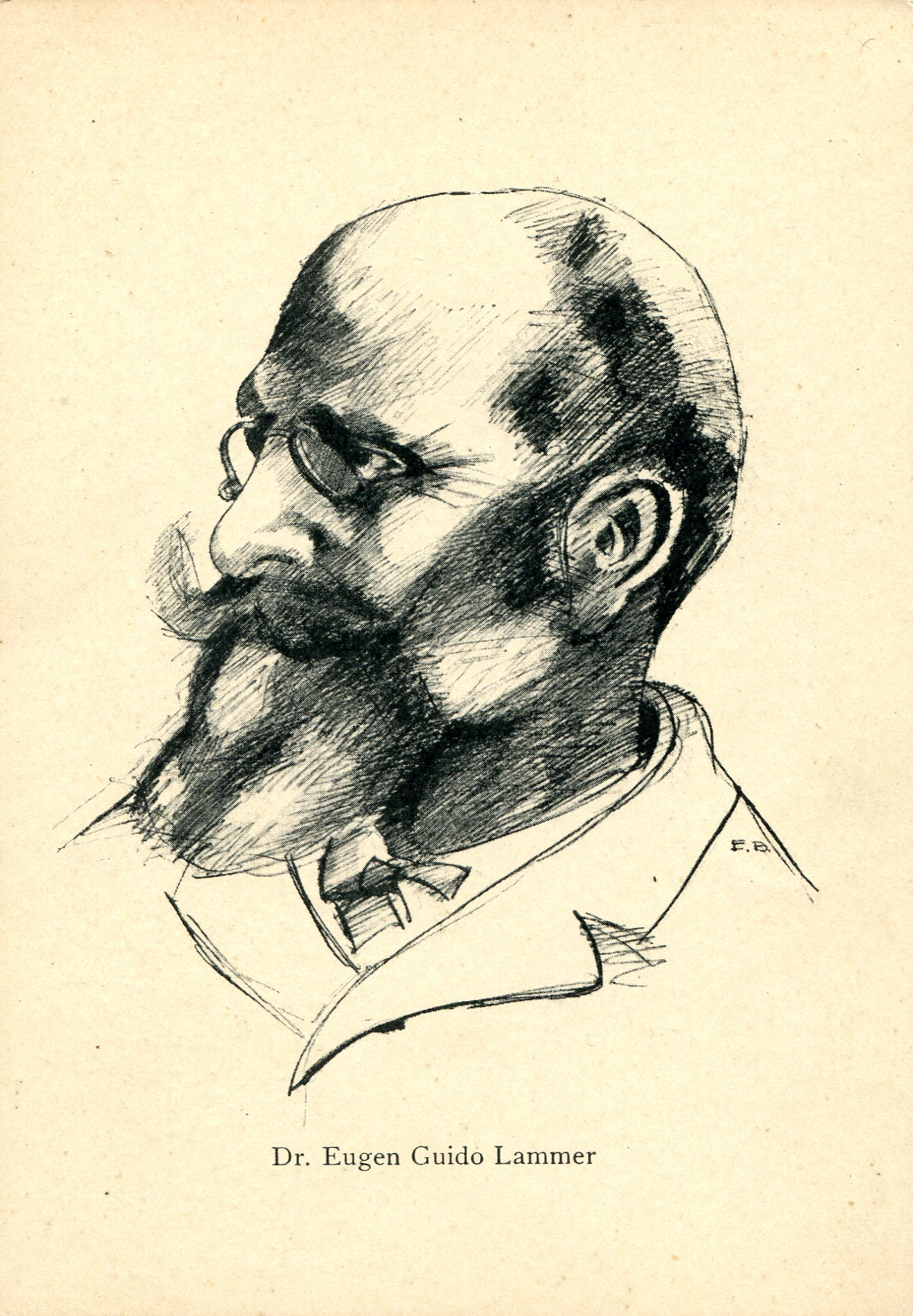

Eugen Guido Lammer (1863–1945) was a mountaineer of Austrian origin. Along with August Lorria, he was one of the pioneers of climbing routes without help provided from professional guides. In 1887 he attempted to climb the route Penhall in Matterhorn on the Western side, but was swept away from an avalanche. Lammer, being injured, he had to crawl from Stokje to Stafel Alp to ask aid for his seriously injured comrade. Lammer and others were opposed to the traditional way of mountaineering. He never used mountain guides, artificial equipment or anything else that intervened between the mountaineer and the mountain.
