= Vordere Brandjochspitze =

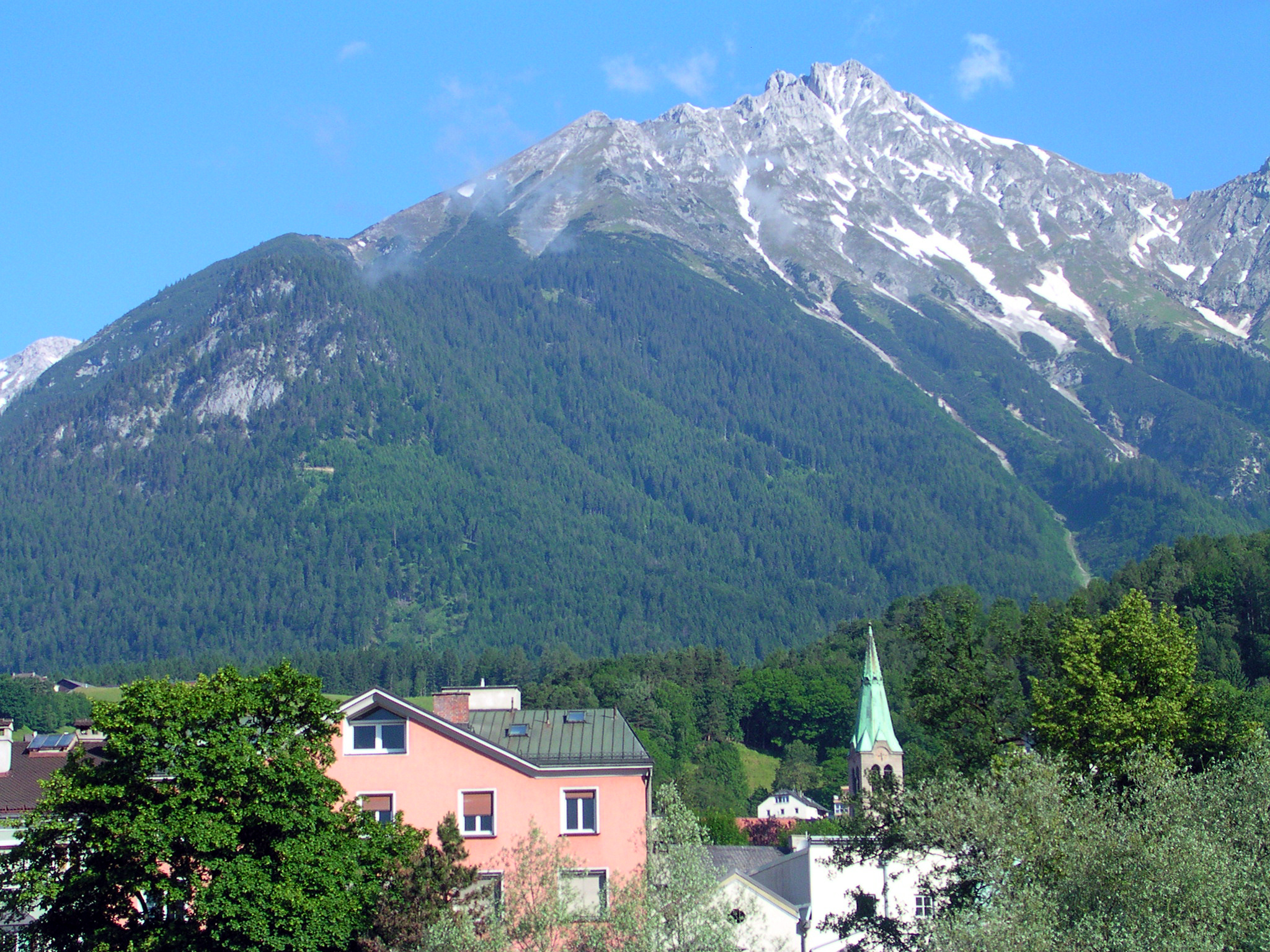
- The Vordere Brandjochspitze seen from Innsbruck

Highest point
- Elevation: 2,559 m (AA) (8,396 ft)
- Coordinates: 47°18′07″N 11°20′27″E

Geography
- Location within Austria
- Location: Tyrol, Austria
- Parent range: Nordkette, Karwendel

Geology
- Rock age: Triassic
- Rock type: Wetterstein limestone

Climbing
- First ascent: 1867 by Julius Pock
- Normal route: Protected route (UIAA I)

The Vordere Brandjochspitze is a peak, 2,559 m (AA) high, in the Nordkette in the Karwendel range and is one of its highest and most striking peaks. In its immediate vicinity to the north-northwest is its sister summit, the Hintere Brandjochspitze, which is about 40 metres higher. To the south a prominent arête runs over to the Brandjochkreuz (2,268 m (AA)) and the Achselkopf (1,560 m (AA)) and down to the Innsbruck quarter of Hötting. To the east, the main ridge of the Nordkette runs over to Frau Hitt.

== Ascents ==
The easiest ascent, the Julius Pock Way, runs from the Frau Hitt Saddle (2,235 m (AA)), which may be reached on various routes from Innsbruck or Scharnitz through the Gleirschtal and Kleinkristental valleys, up to the summit on a UIAA grade I, partly protected, route to the top. Another popular route runs along the Brandjochsüdgrat (UIAA III-) arête.

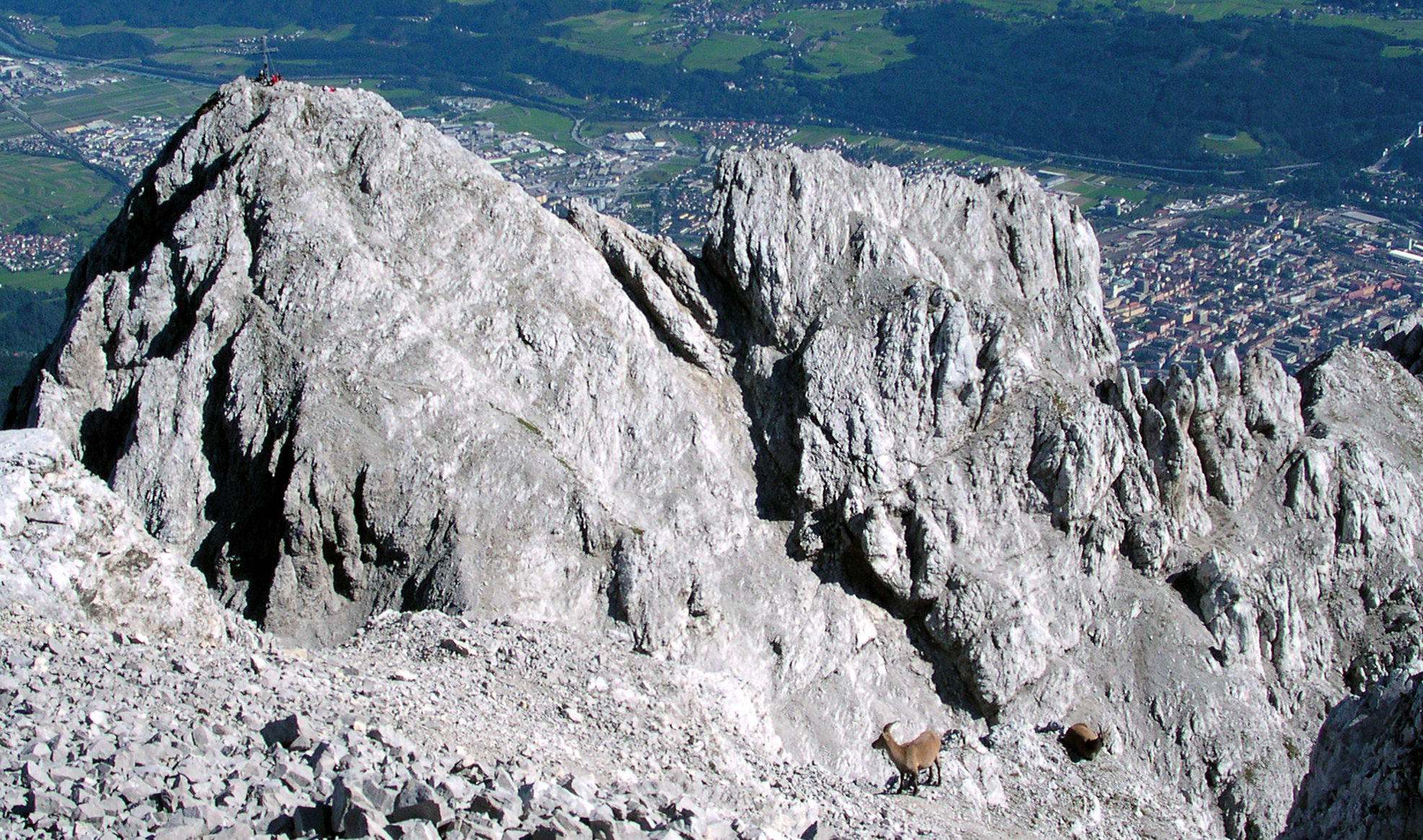
The Vordere Brandjochspitze seen from the Hintere Brandjochspitze. Behind: Innsbruck. Foreground: two young ibexes.

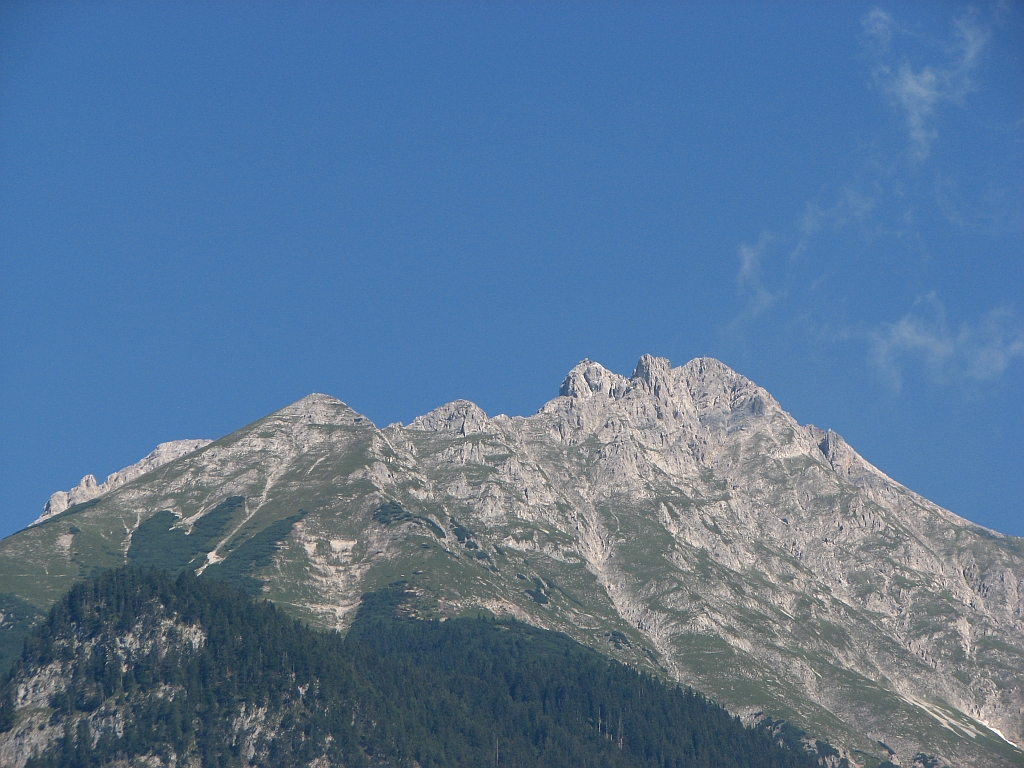
The Brandjochsüdgrat arête and Brandjochkreuz (left) and Vordere Brandjochspitze (right)

== Literature ==
- Klier, Walter (1996), Alpenvereinsführer Karwendelgebirge (in German) (14 ed.), München: Bergverlag Rudolf Rother, ISBN 3763311211
