= Frau Hitt =

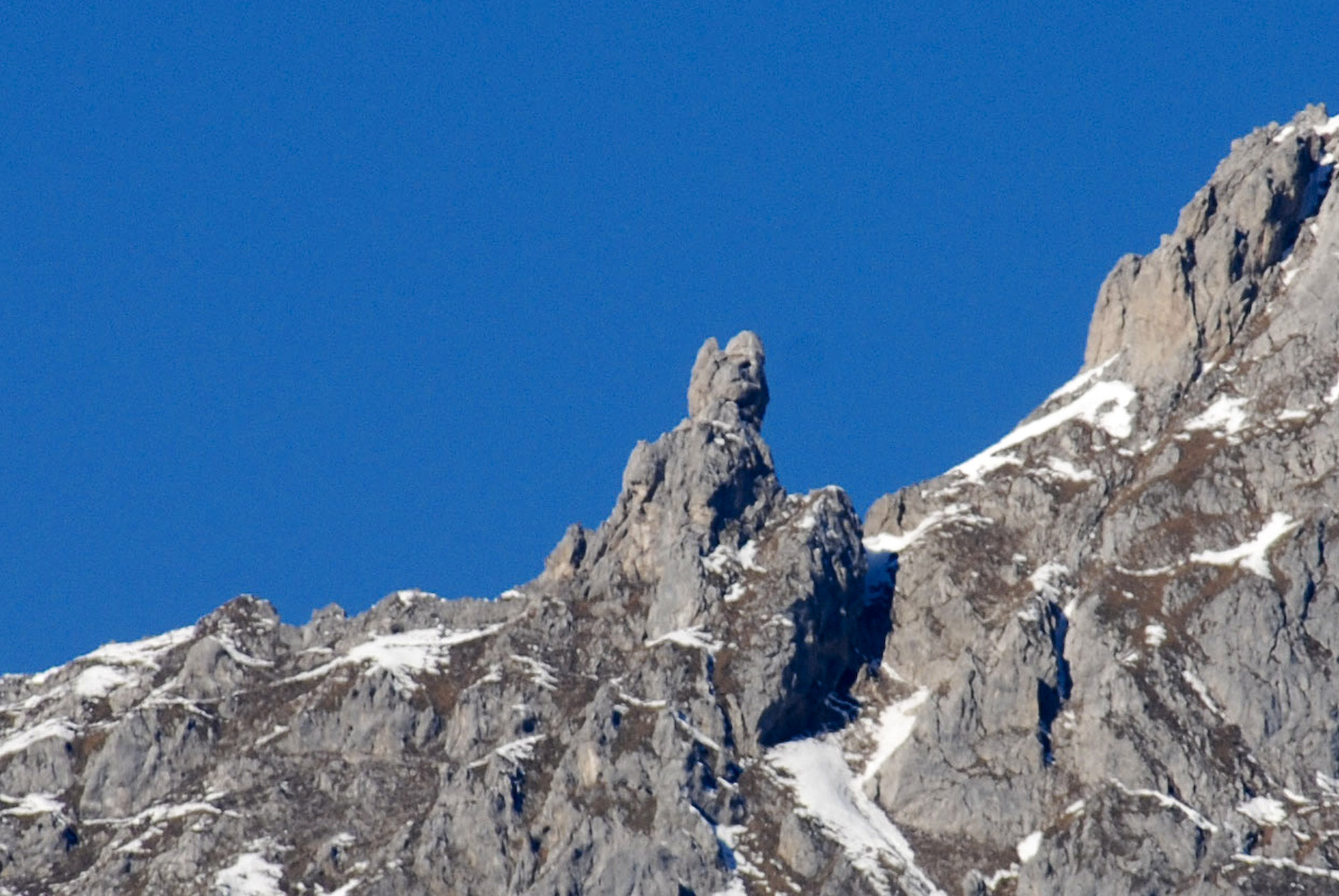
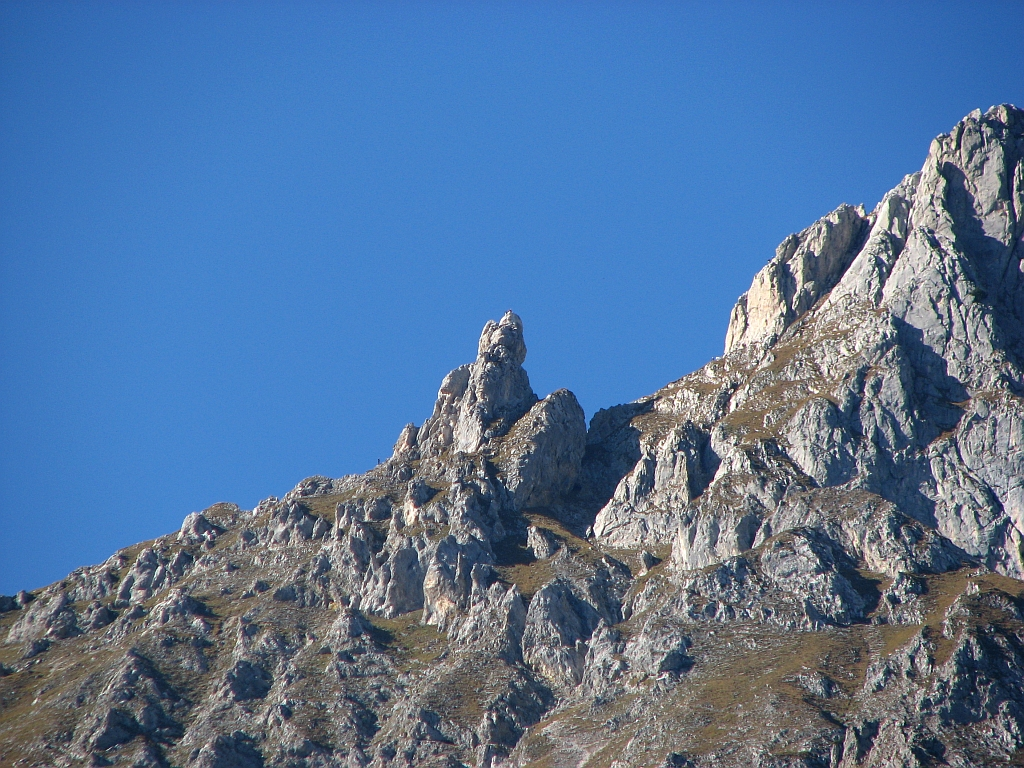
- Frau Hitt Zoom shot of the Frau Hitt

Highest point
- Elevation: 2,270 m (AA) (7,450 ft)
- Coordinates: 47°18′19″N 11°21′2″E

Geography
- Location within Austria
- Location: Tyrol, Austria
- Parent range: Nordkette, Karwendel

Geology
- Rock type: Kalk

Climbing
- First ascent: probably 1580 by Johann Georg Ernstinger
- Normal route: in one place III, otherwise II

The Frau Hitt (2,270 m (AA)) is a peak in the Nordkette, the southernmost mountain chain of the Karwendel in Austria. In appearance it resembles a woman (German: Frau) on a horse, hence the name.

According to legend the peak is a petrified giant queen, called Frau Hitt, who was known for her avarice and self-infatuation. The legend has various versions. One widespread story is that Frau Hitt only offered a beggar woman a stone to eat. The beggar woman was so incensed by this mockery that she cursed the giantess and her horse, which were then turned into stone as an eternal punishment. In an other version it's the punishment for wasting "soft bread" to clean her spoiled son. Children are told they would end like Frau Hitt if they waste precious food.

The prominent rock needle, high above Innsbruck, used to be a tourist symbol for the city. A plan to create a spectacular wrapping over Frau Hitt by artists Christo and Jeanne-Claude finally failed through lack of funds.

Frau Hitt was probably first climbed in 1580 by Johann Georg Ernstinger. It was conquered several times during the 19th century by unknown mountaineers. Frau Hitt is usually climbed via the west shoulder (at one place III, otherwise II). To reach this shoulder there is a route from the east (grade II) and a rather more difficult one (III+) from the west.

The Frau Hitt Saddle (2,235 m above sea level (AA)) lies west of Frau Hitt, where a crossing from the Inn Valley to the Gleirschtal valley is possible (the protected ascent to the Frau Hitt Cirque (Frau Hitt-Kar) is north of and below Frau Hitt). Neighbouring crossings are: in the west the Erl Saddle near the Solsteinhaus, in the east the Hafelekar top station.

Frau Hitt Saddle is the crossing point of the following hiking trails and climbing routes:

- SE descent on the Schmidhubersteig, then either to the Seegrube (1,905 m above sea level (AA), a station on the Nordkette Cable Car) or descent via the Höttinger Alm to Innsbruck
- Hut tour from the Solsteinhaus via the Gipfelstürmerweg north of the western Nordkette to the Frau Hitt Saddle, from there continuing to the Seegrube and up to the Hafelekarspitze, from the Hafelekarspitze on the Goethe Way to the Pfeis Hut
- NW descent through the Frau Hitt Cirque, Kleinkristental, Gleirschtal and the western Hinterau valley to Scharnitz
- SW ascent to the Vordere Brandjochspitze
- NE start or finish of the Innsbruck Klettersteig

== Gallery ==
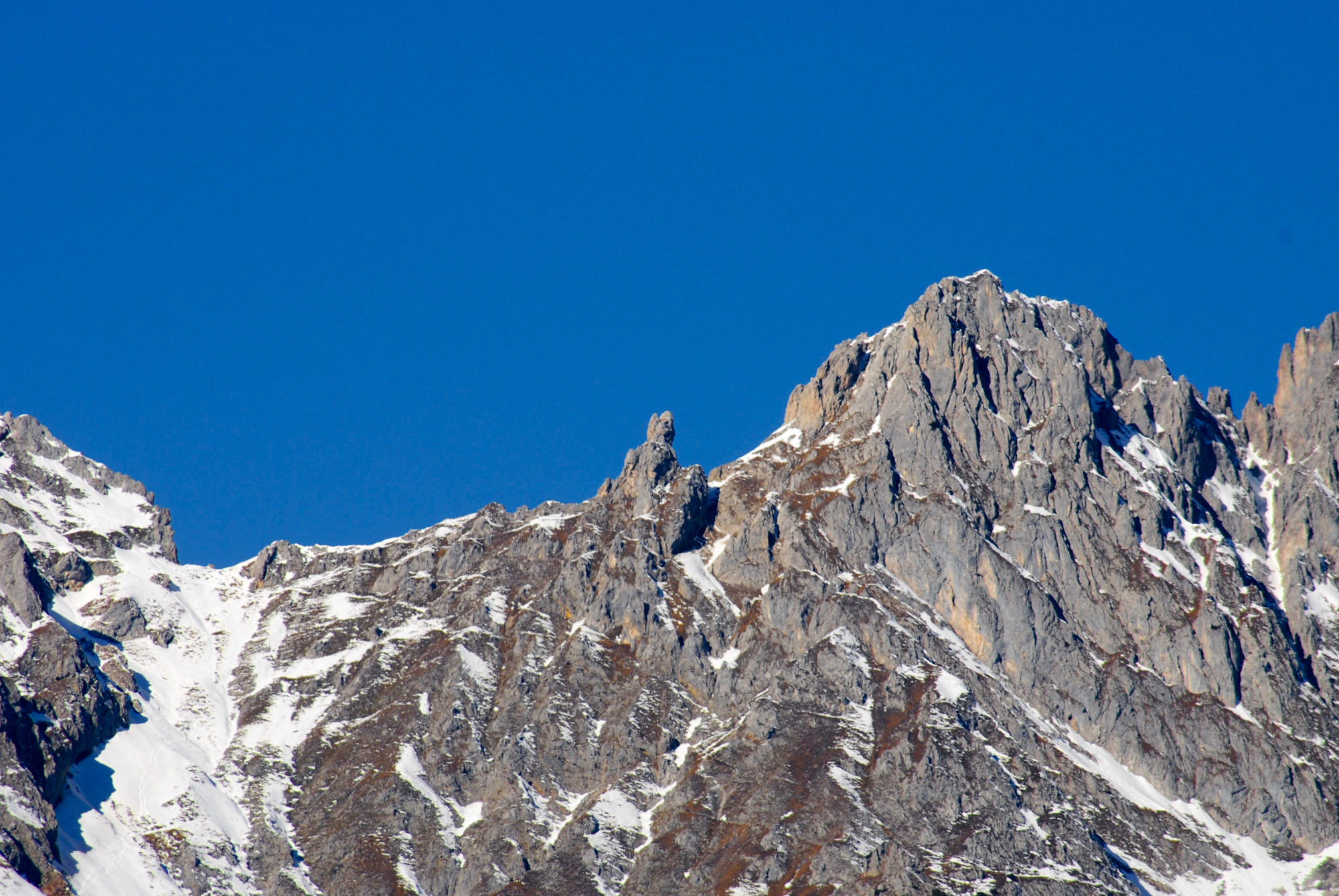
Frau Hitt between the Frau Hitt Saddle (l) and Western Sattelspitze (r)

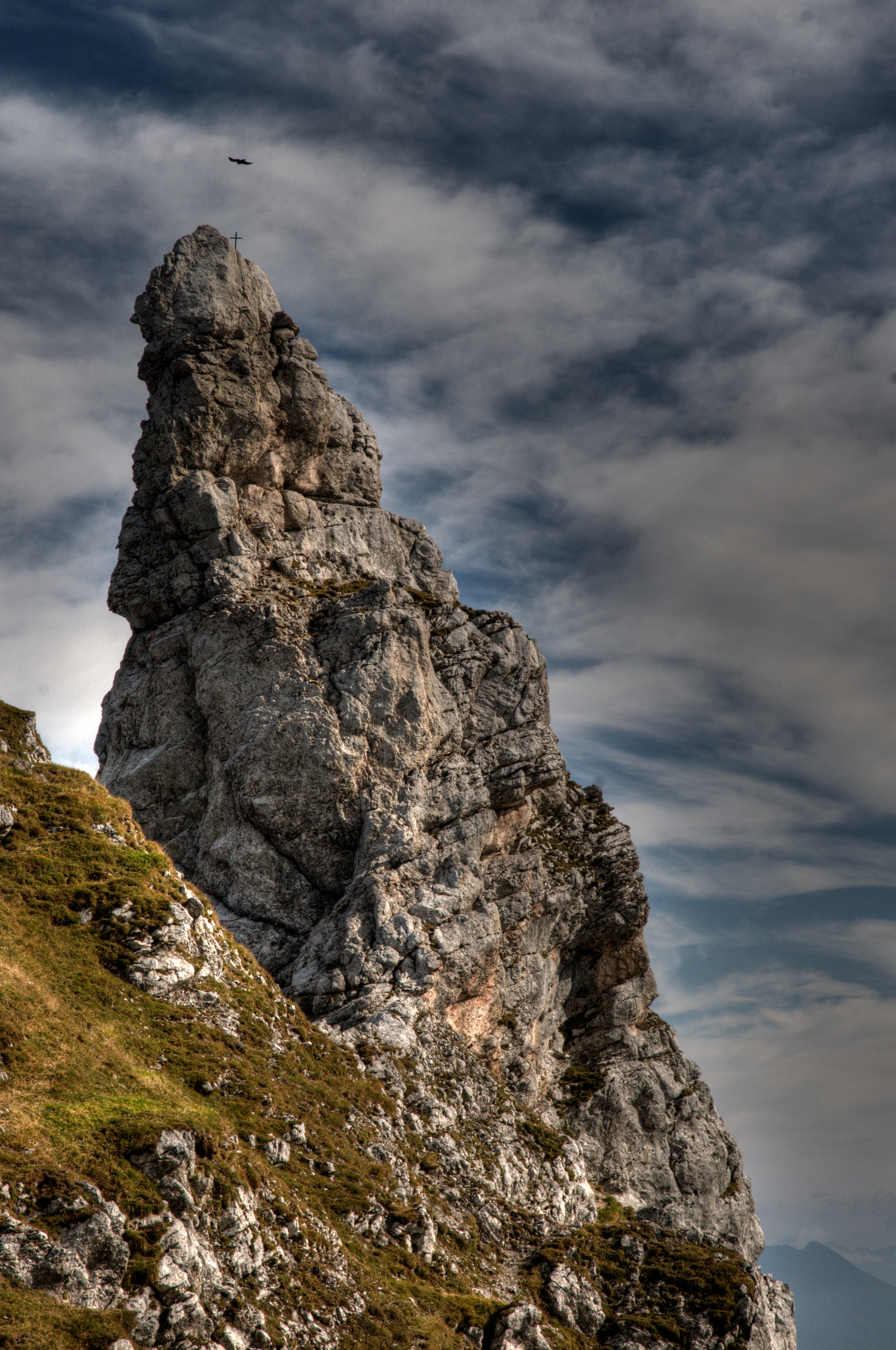
West side of Frau Hitt

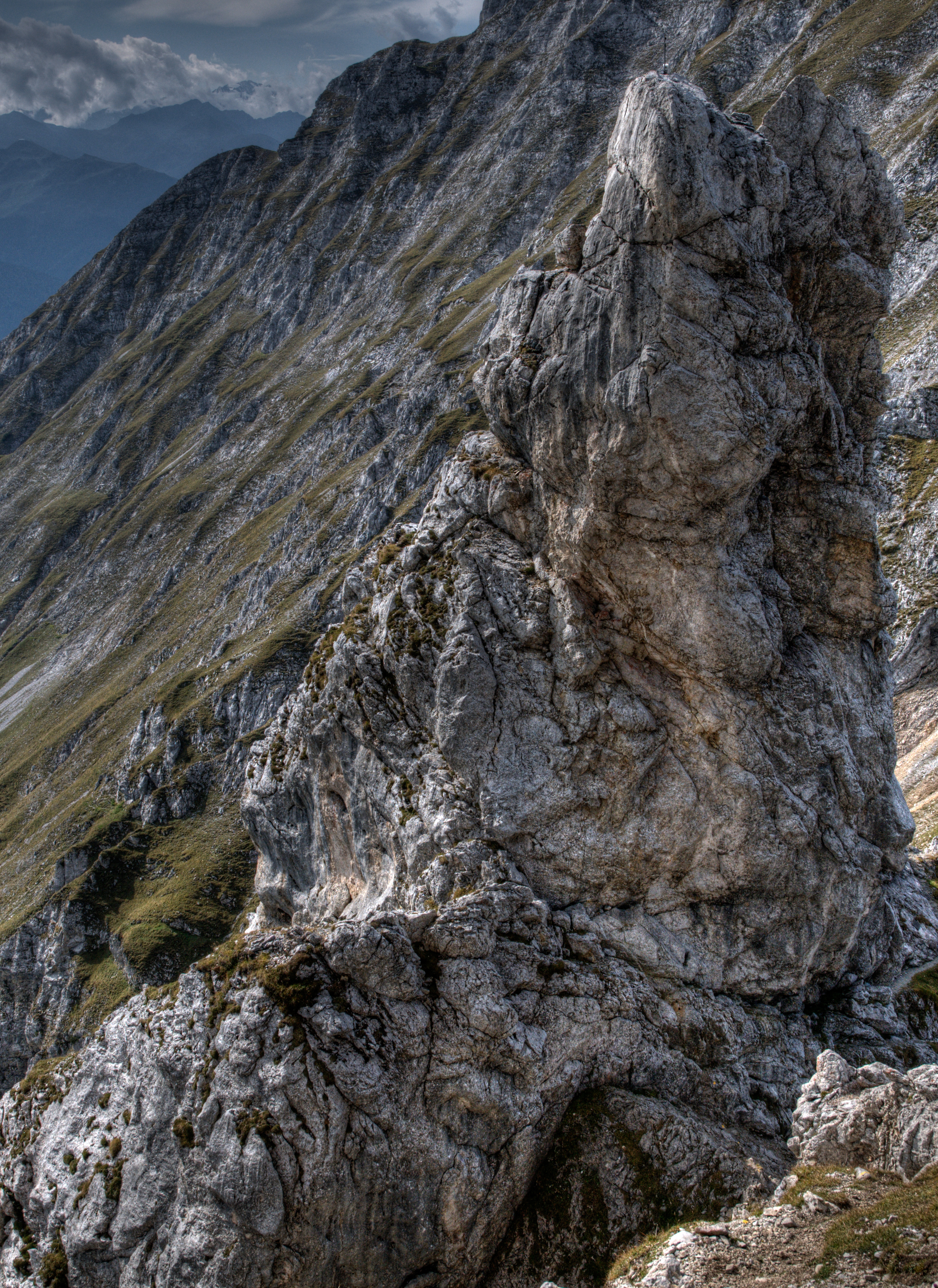
East side of Frau Hitt
