= Three-headed monster =

Three-headed monster may refer to:

- 3 Headed Monsters, a 3x3 basketball team
- 3-Headed Shark Attack (2015), horror film
- Azi dahaka, a three-headed dragon in Persian mythology
- Cerberus, a multi-headed (usually three-headed) dog in Greek and Roman mythology
- King Ghidorah, a three-headed dragon in the Godzilla franchise
  - Ghidorah, the Three-Headed Monster (1964), the kaiju film in which Ghidorah debuted
- Triple deity, a deity associated with the number three in mythology
- Zmiy Gorynych, a multi-headed (usually three-headed) Slavic dragon

== See also ==
- Two-Headed Monster, a Muppets character
