= Großer Solstein =

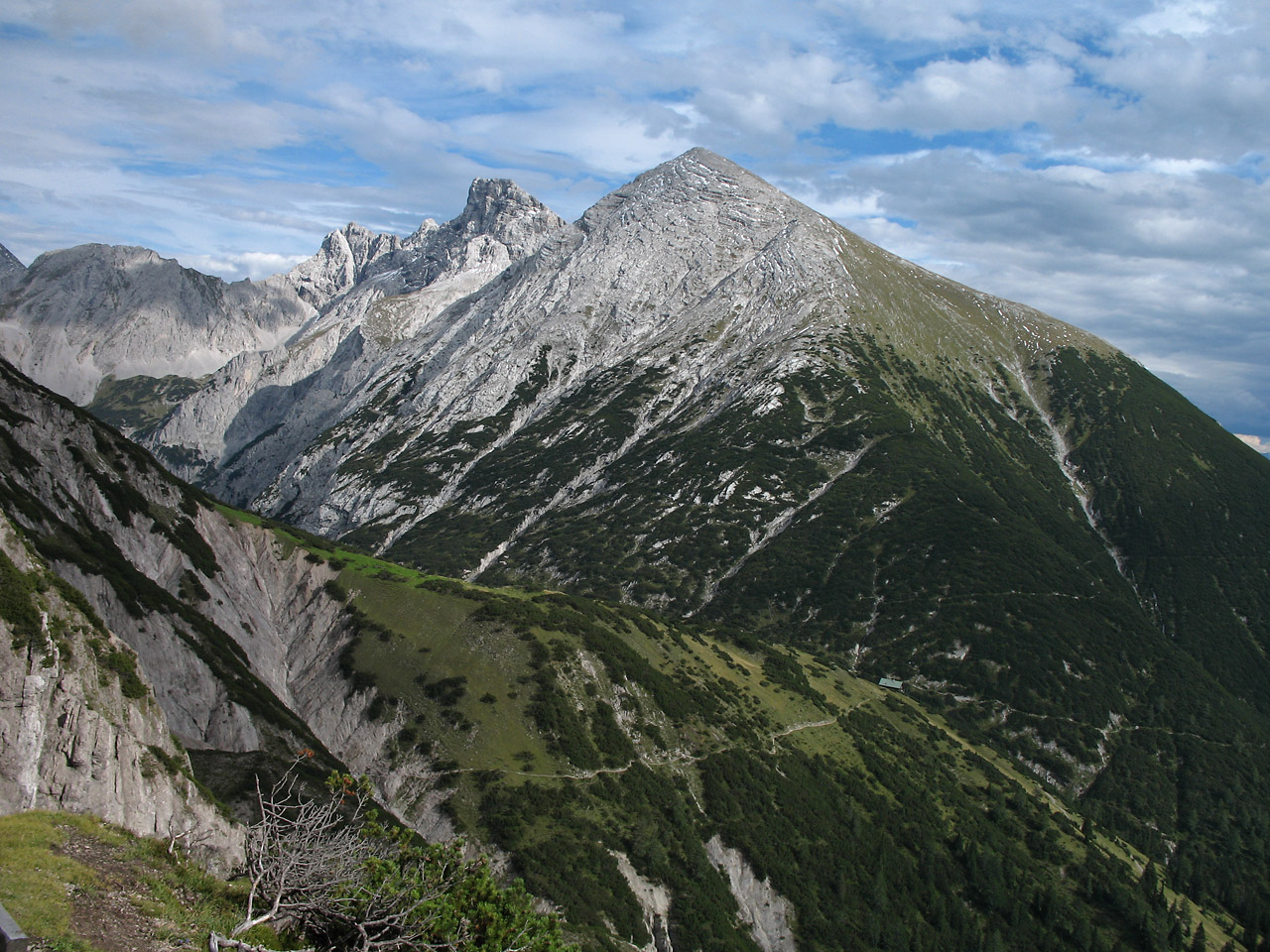
- The Großer Solstein (to its left the Kleiner Solstein) seen from the Kuhljochspitze

Highest point
- Elevation: 2,541 m (AA) (8,337 ft)
- Coordinates: 47°18′10″N 11°18′28″E

Geography
- Location within Austria
- Location: Tyrol, Austria
- Parent range: Nordkette, Karwendel

Geology
- Rock age: Triassic (Ladinian to Lower Carnian)
- Rock type: Wetterstein limestone

Climbing
- First ascent: in 1846 by Carl von Sonklar
- Normal route: mountain tour, good stamina necessary

The Große Solstein is a mountain, 2,541 m (AA) high, on the western corner of the Nordkette range in the Karwendel mountains near Zirl in the Austrian state of Tyrol. Its summit may be ascended on various mountain tour routes either from the Solsteinhaus or from the New Magdeburg Hut. These routes are described as not difficult but require stamina. The crossing to the higher peak of the Kleiner Solstein (2,637 m (AA)), despite its name the highest in the Nordkette, is described in that article.

== Literature ==
- Klier, Walter (1996), Alpine Club Guide Karwendelgebirge alpin (in German) (14 ed.), Munich: Bergverlag Rudolf Rother, ISBN 3763311211
