= Cetu Javu =

German synthpop band

- Origin: Hannover, Germany
- Genres: Synth-pop
- Years active: 1984–1994
- Labels: ZYX; Blanco y Negro; Basic Mix; Modermusic; Cleopatra
- Past members: Javier Revilla Diez (1984–1994); Chris Demere (1984–1994); Torsten Engelke (1984–1994); Stefan Engelke (1985–1989); Thorsten Kraass (1989–1994); Martyn Thomas Chadwick (1984); Cord (1984–1985)

Cetu Javu was a German synth-pop band that was active between 1987 and 1994, consisting of singer Javier Revilla Diez, Chris Demere on keyboards, Stefan Engelke and Torsten Engelke.

Vocalist Revilla Diez was born in Germany, and although his parents had emigrated from Spain, most of his songs are sung in English with several in Spanish. Cetu Javu had several dance hits with "Situations", "Have in Mind" and "A Dónde".

After Cetu Javu ended, vocalist Revilla Diez became a professor of geography at the Leibniz University Hannover. Since April 2014, Revilla Diez holds a Chair in human geography at the Institute of Geography at the University of Cologne.

On November 19, 2020, after 25 years without appearing in any media, Javier Revilla gave an exclusive interview with Spanish radio host Miguel Moreno in which he told the entire story of the Group.

Cetu Javu released two albums, Southern Lands (ZYX Records, 1990) and Where Is Where (Blanco y Negro Music, 1992).

== Discography ==
=== Studio albums ===
| Year | Album details | Chart peak positions | | | | | Certifications (sales thresholds) |
| Year | Album details | UK | SPA | GER | SWE | US | Certifications (sales thresholds) |
|---|---|---|---|---|---|---|---|
| 1990 | Southern Lands: Released: 1990; Labels: ZYX Records, Galaxia, Basic Mix; Formats: CD, LP, CS | — | — | — | — | — | |
| 1992 | Where Is Where: Released: 1992; Labels: Blanco y Negro Music; Formats: CD, LP, CS | — | — | — | — | — | |

=== Compilation albums ===
| Year | Album details | Chart peak positions | | | | | Certifications (sales thresholds) |
| Year | Album details | UK | SPA | GER | SWE | US | Certifications (sales thresholds) |
|---|---|---|---|---|---|---|---|
| 1994 | Tiempo De Remixes: Released: 1994; Labels: Modermusic; Format: CD | — | — | — | — | — | |
| 2009 | Situations – The Very Best of Cetu Javu: Released: 2009; Labels: Cleopatra Records; Format: CD, digital download | — | — | — | — | — | |

=== Singles ===
| Year | Song | Chart peak positions | | | | | | Album |
| Year | Song | UK | SPA | GER | SWE | US | US Dance | Album |
|---|---|---|---|---|---|---|---|---|
| 1987 | "Help Me Now!" | — | — | — | — | — | — | Non-album single |
| 1988 | "Situations" | — | — | — | — | — | — | Southern Lands |
| 1988 | "Have in Mind" | — | — | — | — | — | — | Southern Lands |
| 1989 | "So Strange" | — | — | — | — | — | — | Southern Lands |
| 1989 | "A Dónde" | — | 2 | — | — | — | — | Southern Lands |
| 1991 | "Por Que?" | — | — | — | — | — | — | Where Is Where |
| 1992 | "Dáme Tu Mano" | — | — | — | — | — | — | Where Is Where |
| 1993 | "Una Mujer" | — | — | — | — | — | — | Where Is Where |
| 1994 | "Tiempo" | — | — | — | — | — | — | Where Is Where |
"—" denotes a single that did not chart or was not released in that region

== Bibliography ==
- Matthias Blazek: Das niedersächsische Bandkompendium 1963–2003 – Daten und Fakten von 100 Rockgruppen aus Niedersachsen. Celle 2006, p. 36 ISBN 978-3-00-018947-0
