= Schrofen =

German mountaineering term

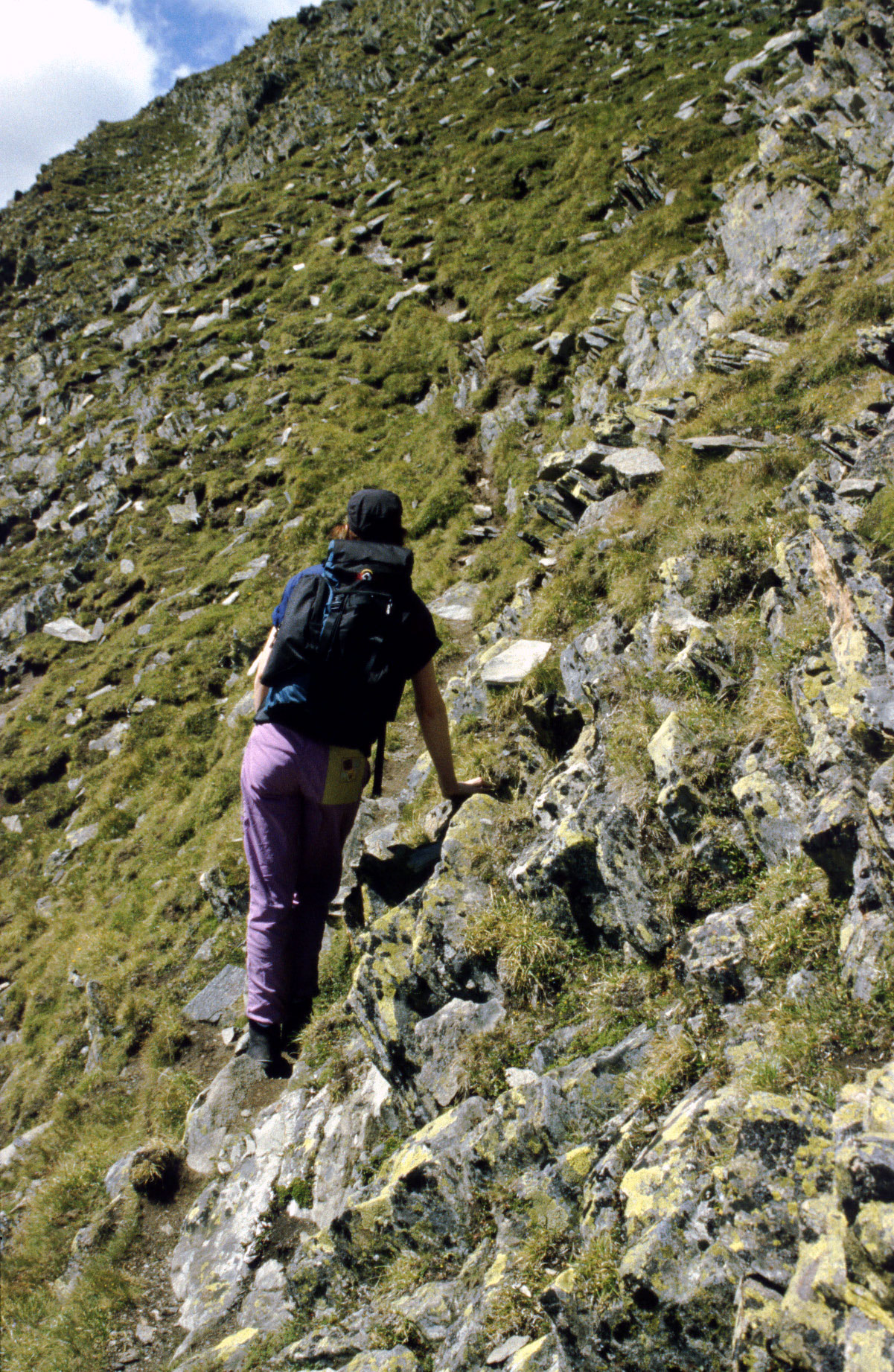
Schrofen terrain

Schrofen, a German mountaineering term, is steep terrain, strewn with rocks and rock outcrops, that is laborious to cross, but whose rock ledges (schrofen) offer many good steps and hand holds. It is usually rocky terrain on which grass has established itself, but it can also refer to purely rocky slopes. Schrofen are found especially where the rock has broken off against its angle of dip.

Schrofen differs from trackless terrain in that hands are needed in order to negotiate it. Often there are route markings that only indicate a rough direction.

Schrofen terrain requires at least sure-footedness and is typical of grade I climbing routes. In wet weather schrofen can become very dangerous because of the increased risk of slipping, particularly in the descent. In addition, the risk of falling in schrofen terrain is often underestimated.

In keeping with the base meaning of the word ("rock spikes"), schrofen also forms part of the name of numerous mountains in the Northern Limestone Alps. Alpine farms near a schrofen are often named after it, as are their access roads, e.g.: Ob dm Schrofa, Schrofaweg. The word is linked to the German adjective schroff which means rugged, steep or craggy.
