= Southern Lands =

Studio album by Cetu Javu
- Released: 27 March 1990
- Recorded: 1988–1989
- Genre: Synth-pop
- Length: 51:20
- Label: ZYX
- Producers: Cetu Javu; Matthias Härtl

Cetu Javu chronology
Southern Lands (1990)	Where Is Where (1992)

Singles from Southern Lands
- 1. "Situations" Released: 1988; 2. "Have in Mind" Released: December 1988; 3. "So Strange" Released: October 1989; 4. "A Dónde" Released: 1990 (promo, Spain)

Professional ratings
Review scores
Source	Rating
AllMusic	4/5 stars

Southern Lands is the debut album by Cetu Javu, released in 1990.

== Release ==
The song "Situations" was released in 1988 as the first single from Southern Lands, appearing in a remixed version. The second single, "Have in Mind", was released as a single in December 1988. A new remixed version appeared on Southern Lands.

The third single "A Dónde" was released in 1989. The song was released as a single in Spain and the extended version originally featured as the B-side to "So Strange". A new 12" remix version b/w "Una Mujer" was released in 1993. Mexican band Sentidos Opuestos recorded a cover version of the song which was included on their 1997 album Viviendo del Futuro.

The fourth and final single, "So Strange", was released in November 1989. A shorter edited version of the song appeared on Southern Lands.

== Track listing ==
All songs written by Chris Demere (music) and Javier Revilla-Diez (lyrics).

=== CD: GLX 20168-2 ===
1. "Southern Lands" – 4:14
2. "Love Me" – 4:13
3. "Oye" – 4:22
4. "Words Without Thoughts" – 4:21
5. "So Strange" – 3:58
6. "Get It" – 4:59
7. "Situations" – 4:01
8. "Bad Dreams" – 3:46
9. "Have in Mind" – 3:31
10. "Quién Lo Sabía?" – 7:10
11. "Fight Without a Reason" – 2:47
12. "Adónde" – 3:58

=== LP: ZYX 20168-1 ===
Side one

1. "Southern Lands" – 4:14
2. "Love Me" – 4:13
3. "Oye" – 4:22
4. "Words Without Thoughts" – 4:21
5. "So Strange" – 3:58

Side two

1. "Get It" – 4:59
2. "Situations" – 4:01
3. "Bad Dreams" – 3:46
4. "Have in Mind" – 3:31
5. "Quién Lo Sabía?" – 7:10

=== LP: BASICLP 021 (1990 Spanish pressing) ===
Side one

1. "Southern Lands" – 4:14
2. "Love Me" – 4:13
3. "Oye" – 4:22
4. "Words Without Thoughts" – 4:21
5. "So Strange" – 3:58
6. "Get It" – 4:59

Side two

1. "Situations" – 4:01
2. "Bad Dreams" – 3:46
3. "Have in Mind" – 3:31
4. "Quién Lo Sabía?" – 7:10
5. "Fight Without a Reason" – 2:47
6. "Adónde" – 3:58

=== CS: BASICAS 021 ===
Side one

1. "Southern Lands" – 4:14
2. "Love Me" – 4:13
3. "Oye" – 4:22
4. "Words Without Thoughts" – 4:21
5. "So Strange" – 3:58
6. "Get It – 4:59

Side two

1. "Situations" – 4:01
2. "Bad Dreams" – 3:46
3. "Have in Mind" – 3:31
4. "Quién Lo Sabía?" – 7:10
5. "Fight Without a Reason" – 2:47
6. "Adónde" – 3:58

== Personnel ==
Musicians

- Javier Revilla-Diez – voice, words
- Chris Demere – synthesizers and keyboards
- Torsten Engelke – synthesizers
- Stefan Engelke – synthesizers

Production

- Recorded and mixed at Hansa Tonstudio, Berlin, except "Situations", "Have in Mind" and "Quién Lo Sabía?", recorded at Studio M, Hannover, by Jan Nemec, remixed at Hansa Tonstudio, Berlin
- Produced by Cetu Javu & Matthias Härtl
- Engineered by Matthias Härtl
- Assistant engineers: Shannon Strong, A. Moses Schneider and Alex Leser
- Cover: Bart E. Streefkerk
