= List of songs recorded by Lali =

Lali Espósito is an Argentine singer and actress. Her music career started in 2003 when she contributed vocals to the soundtrack album for the Argentine telenovela, Rincón de Luz. From 2007 to 2012, the singer was part of the pop-group Teen Angels, derived from the television series Casi Ángeles in which she also starred from the same from 2007 to 2010. In 2013 Espósito also began to work as an independent artist outside of Teen Angels. Later that year, the singer released four songs for the Argentine telenovela Solamente Vos in which she starred. Her debut single "A Bailar" was released the same year.

A Bailar was released in March 2014. It was preceded by the release of the second single, "Asesina". Follow-up singles included "Mil Años Luz", "Del Otro Lado" and "Histeria". All the songs from the album were written by Espósito and music producers Pablo Akselrad, Luis Burgio and Gustavo Novello, except for "Desamor" and "Being" that were also composed by Antonella Giunta.

In 2015, Espósito appeared on nine of the eleven tracks of the soundtrack for "Esperanza Mía". The singer co-wrote two songs for the album including "Júrame" and "Esperanza Mía". Other notable contributing songwriters on Esperanza Mía include Luciano Pereyra who co-wrote "Cómo Haremos", Alejandro Sergi of Miranda! who composed "El Ritmo del Momento", Florencia Bertotti who co-wrote "Me Muero por Vos" and "Paul Schwartz who co-wrote all the tracks in where Esósito appears, except for "El Ritmo del Momento".

"Soy" was released as the lead single of Espósito's second studio album, Soy, in 2016. The song was written by Espósito, Novello, Akselrad and Burgio.

== Songs ==
Key
†	Indicates a song released as a single

Songs recorded by Espósito
Song name	Artist(s)	Writer(s)	Originating album	Year	Ref.
"1Amor"	Lali	Mariana Espósito; Martín D'Agosto; Mauro De Tomasso	Spotify Singles	2023	
"2 Son 3" †	Lali	Mariana Espósito; Martín D'Agosto; Mauro De Tomasso	Lali	2022	
"33" †	Lali and Dillom	Mariana Espósito; Dylan León Masa; Mauro De Tommaso; Federico Barretobr; Isabela Teran Lieban; Juan Giménez Kuj; Mariano Napoli	No Vayas a Atender Cuando el Demonio Llama	2025	
"100 Grados" †	Lali featuring A. Chal	Mariana Espósito; Alejandro Salazar; Andres Restrepo; Gustavo Novello; Luis Burgio; Pablo Akselrad; Salomón Villada Hoyos; Stiven Rojas; Kevin Mauricio Jiménez; Bryan Snaider Lezcano; Alejandro Patiño; Jowan Espinosa; Juan Pablo Piedrahita; Daniel Giraldo	Brava	2018	
"A Bailar" †	Lali	Mariana Espósito; Pablo Akselrad; Luis Burgio; Gustavo Novello	A Bailar	2013	
"A Oscuras" †	Ptazeta featuring Lali	Mariana Espósito; Zuleima Del Pino; Martín D'Agosto; Mauro De Tommaso; Franco Briceño; Hector Mazzarri; Joaquín Domínguez	Gorgona	2024	
"Ahora"	Lali	Mariana Espósito; Martín D'Agosto; Mauro De Tomasso	Lali	2023	
"Amor de Agua y Sal"	Lali Espósito	Inés Oliveiro; Mauro Gonzalez	None	2013	
"Amor de Verdad"	Lali featuring Zetta Krome	Mariana Espósito; Pablo Akselrad; Luis Burgio; Gustavo Novello	A Bailar	2014	
"Amor Es Presente"	Lali	Mariana Espósito; Pablo Akselrad; Luis Burgio; Gustavo Novello	Soy	2016	
"Asesina" †	Lali	Mariana Espósito; Pablo Akselrad; Luis Burgio; Gustavo Novello	A Bailar	2013	
"Bailarás"	Lali	Mariana Espósito; Martín D'Agosto; Mauro De Tomasso	None	2022	
"Bailo Pa Mí"	Lali	Mariana Espósito; Abraham Mateo; Edgar Andino	Libra	2020	
"Being"	Lali	Mariana Espósito; Pablo Akselrad; Luis Burgio; Gustavo Novello; Antonella Giunta	A Bailar	2014	
"Besarte Mucho" †	Lali	Mariana Espósito; Pablo Akselrad; Luis Burgio; Gustavo Novello	Brava	2018	
"Baum Baum" †	Lali	Mariana Espósito; Martín D'Agosto; Mauro De Tommaso	Lali (Deluxe edition)	2023	
"Bomba"	Lali	Mariana Espósito; Pablo Akselrad; Luis Burgio; Gustavo Novello	Soy	2016	
"Boomerang" †	Lali	Ayak Thiik; Will Simms; Mariana Espósito; Pablo Akselrad; Luis Burgio; Gustavo Novello	Soy	2016	
"Brilla"	Lali and Abel Pintos	Cris Morena; Tomás Mayer; Martín Pennacino; Federico Vilas; Fernando López Rossi	ViveRo: Noche de Sueños	2018	
"Caliente" †	Lali featuring Pabllo Vittar	Mariana Espósito; Arthur Marques; Pablo Bispo; Rodrigo Gorky; Pablo Akselrad; Luis Burgio; Gustavo Novello	Brava	2018	
"Cielo Salvador"	Lali	Mariana Espósito; Pablo Akselrad; Luis Burgio; Gustavo Novello	A Bailar	2014	
"Color Esperanza 2020" †	Various Artists	Cachorro López; Coti Sorokin; Diego Torres	None	2020	
"Como Así" †	Lali featuring CNCO	Mariana Espósito; Andrés Restrepo; Jowan Espinosa; Juan Manuel Farías; Pablo Preciado; Yoel Henriquez	Libra	2019	
"Cómo Haremos"	Lali	José Luis Micucci; Luciano Pereyra; Paul Schwartz	Esperanza Mía	2015	
"Como Tú" †	Lali	Mariana Espósito; Martín D'Agosto; Mauro De Tommaso	Lali	2022	
"Cómprame un Brishito" †	Lali	Mariana Espósito; Martín D'Agosto; Mauro De Tommaso	Lali	2023	
"Corazón Perdido"	Lali	Mariana Espósito; Martín D'Agosto; Mauro De Tommaso	Lali (Deluxe edition)	2023	
"Cree en Mí"	Lali	Mariana Espósito; Pablo Akselrad; Luis Burgio; Gustavo Novello	Soy	2016	
"Cuando Estoy con Vos"	Lali	Mariana Espósito; Marcelo Mato; Hector Ruiz; Alejandro Velazquez; Pablo Akselrad; Luis Burgio; Gustavo Novello	None	2017	
"Cuanto Antes" †	Álex Ubago featuring Lali	Álex Ubago	20 Años	2022	
"Del Otro Lado" †	Lali	Mariana Espósito; Pablo Akselrad; Luis Burgio; Gustavo Novello	A Bailar	2013	
"Desamor"	Lali	Mariana Espósito; Pablo Akselrad; Luis Burgio; Gustavo Novello; Antonella Giunta	A Bailar	2014	
"Dime Por Qué"	Lali Espósito	Fernando López; Pablo Durand; Cris Morena	Teenangels 5	2011	
"Disciplina" †	Lali	Mariana Espósito; Daniel Amarise Diaz; Martín D'Agosto; Mauro De Tommaso	Lali	2022	
"Disparos"	Abel Pintos and Lali	Abel Pintos; Tommy Torres; Ariel Pintos	El Amor en Mi Vida	2021	
"Diva" †	Lali	Mariana Espósito; Daniel Amarise Diaz; Martín D'Agosto; Mauro De Tommaso	Lali	2022	
"Dos Días en la Vida"	Fito Páez, Lali and Nicki Nicole	Fito Páez	EADDA9223	2023	
"Eclipse"	Lali	Mariana Espósito; Rafael Arcaute; Julio Reyes; Nicolás De La Espirella; Leroy Sanchez	Libra	2020	
"El Amor Que Asoma"	Lali Espósito	Inés Oliveiro; Mauro Gonzalez	None	2013	
"El Ritmo del Momento"	Lali Espósito	Alejandro Sergi	Esperanza Mía	2015	
"El Fin del Amor"	Lali	Mariana Espósito; Martín D'Agosto; Mauro De Tommaso; Federico Barreto	None	2025	
"Enredaos"	Lali	Mariana Espósito; Gabriel Gonzalez; Claudia Prieto; Elena Rose	Libra	2020	
"Ego" †	Lali	Gavin Jones; Tobias Lundgren; Johan Fransson; Tim Larsson; Mariana Espósito; Pablo Akselrad; Luis Burgio; Gustavo Novello	Soy	2016	
"Escaparé"	Lali Espósito	Marcelo Wengrovski; Cris Morena	Teenangels	2007	
"Esperanza Mía"	Lali Espósito	Pablo Akselrad; Luis Burgio; Mariana Espósito; Gustavo Novello; Paul Schwartz	Esperanza Mía	2015	
"Fanático" †	Lali	Mariana Espósito; Martín D'Agosto; Mauro De Tommaso; Federico Barretobr; Isabela Teran Lieban; Juan Giménez Kuj	No Vayas a Atender Cuando el Demonio Llama	2024	
"Fascinada" †	Lali	Mariana Espósito; Rafael Arcaute; Gino Borri; Ángel López; Federico Vindver; Gabriel Edgar Gonzalez	Libra	2020	
"Fin de Transmición"	Lali (Note: Though credited to Lali, "Fin de Transmición" is a spoken outro by Evelyn Botto.)	Mariana Espósito; Mauro De Tommaso; Juan Giménez Kuj	No Vayas a Atender Cuando el Demonio Llama	2025	
"Firestarter"	Brian Cross featuring Lali	Brian Cross; Claudia Brant	Darkness to Light	2016	
"Frente a Tí"	Lali Espósito	Fernando Villa; Emilio Oliveiro; Sebastián Miras; Juan José Leive; Augusto Amicon	None	2013	
"Fuego en el Fuego"	Eros Ramazzotti featuring Lali	Eros Ramazzotti; Adelio Cogliati	Una Historia Importante	2025	
"Gente en la Calle" †	Fito Páez featuring Lali	Fito Páez	La Conquista del Espacio	2020	
"Gloria"	Lali Espósito	Fernando López; Federico Montero; Paul Schwartz	Esperanza Mía	2015	
"Hay Un Lugar..."	Lali Espósito	Fernando López; Pablo Durand; Cris Morena	Teenangels 2	2008	
"Himno a la Alegría"	Various Artists	Ludwig van Beethoven; Waldo de los Ríos; Amado Regueiro Rodriguez	None	2020	
"Histeria" †	Lali	Mariana Espósito; Pablo Akselrad; Luis Burgio; Gustavo Novello	A Bailar	2014	
"Iguales"	Diego Torres featuring Lali and Wisin	Diego Torres; Marcelo Wengrovski; Juan Luis Morera; Claudia Brant	None	2018	
"Incondicional"	Lali	Mariana Espósito; Martín D'Agosto; Mauro De Tomasso	Lali	2023	
"Irresistible"	Lali	Mariana Espósito; Pablo Akselrad; Luis Burgio; Gustavo Novello	Soy	2016	
"Júrame"	Lali Espósito	Pablo Akselrad; Luis Burgio; Mariana Espósito; Gustavo Novello; Paul Schwartz	Esperanza Mía	2015	
"KO"	Lali	Mariana Espósito; Martín D'Agosto; Mauro De Tomasso	Lali	2023	
"La Apuesta"	Melendi and Lali	Ramón Melendi; Mariana Espósito; Alejandro Ramírez; Andy Clay; Rafael Silva de Queiroz; Lucas Santos	Likes y Cicatrices	2021	
"La Carie"	Dillom and Lali	Dylan León Masa; María Elena Walsh	Por Cesárea	2024	
"La Memoria"	Artists for Memoria AMIA	León Gieco	None	2016	
"Ladrón" †	Lali and Cazzu	Mariana Espósito; Julieta Cazzuchelli; Daniel Real; Enzo Sauthier	Libra	2020	
"Laligera" †	Lali	Mariana Espósito; Rafael Arcaute; Gino Borri; Ángel López; Federico Vindver; Gabriel Edgar Gonzalez	Libra	2019	
"Las Maravillas de la Vida" †	Los Ángeles Azules featuring Lali	Jorge Mejia	De Buenos Aires Para El Mundo	2020	
"Lejos de Mí"	Lali	Mariana Espósito; Pablo Akselrad; Luis Burgio; Gustavo Novello	Soy	2016	
"Lindo Pero Bruto" †	Thalía and Lali	Edgar Barrera; Oscar Hernández; Jesús Herrera; Andrés Castro; Patrick Romantik	Valiente	2018	
"Lo Que Tengo Yo" †	Lali	Camilo Echeverry; Marco Masís; Mauricio Montaner; Ricardo Montaner	Libra	2020	
"Lokura"	Lali	Mariana Espósito; Martín D'Agosto; Mauro De Tommaso; Federico Barretobr; Isabela Teran Lieban; Juan Giménez Kuj	No Vayas a Atender Cuando el Demonio Llama	2025	
"Loco Un Poco" †	Turf and Lali	Joaquín Levinton; Carlos Tapia	Polvo de Estrellas	2025	
"Me Muero por Vos"	Lali Espósito	Florencia Bertotti; Guillermo Lorenzo; Paul Schwartz	Esperanza Mía	2015	
"Me Pasan Cosas"	Lali Espósito	Cris Morena; Laurentis	24 Horas	2006	
"Me Voy"	Lali Espósito	Fernando López; Pablo Durand; Cris Morena	Teenangels 4	2010	
"Mejor Que Vos" †	Lali and Miranda!	Mariana Espósito; Martín D'Agosto; Mauro De Tommaso; Alejandro Sergi	No Vayas a Atender Cuando el Demonio Llama	2025	
"Mi Mala (Remix)" †	Mau y Ricky and Karol G featuring Becky G, Leslie Grace and Lali	Ricardo Montaner; Mauricio Montaner; Carolina Navarro; Camilo Echeverry; Jon Leone; Tainy; Max Matluck	Para Aventuras y Curiosidades	2018	
"Mi Religión"	Lali	Mariana Espósito; Pablo Akselrad; Luis Burgio; Gustavo Novello	Soy	2016	
"Mi Última Canción"	Lali featuring Reik	Jesús Navarro; Julio Ramírez; Andrés Torres; Mauricio Rengifo	Brava	2018	
"Mil Años Luz" †	Lali	Mariana Espósito; Pablo Akselrad; Luis Burgio; Gustavo Novello	A Bailar	2014	
"Mil Horas"	Cachorro López and Lali	Andrés Calamaro	Éxtasis Total	2024	
"Morir de Amor"	Lali	Mariana Espósito; Martín D'Agosto; Mauro De Tommaso; Federico Barretobr; Isabela Teran Lieban; Juan Giménez Kuj	No Vayas a Atender Cuando el Demonio Llama	2025	
"Motiveishon" †	Lali	Mariana Espósito; Martín D'Agosto; Mauro De Tomasso	Lali	2022	
"Mueve" †	Abraham Mateo featuring Lali	Jacobo Calderón; Abraham Mateo; Talay Riley; Daniel Ruiz; Brandon Salaan-Bailey	Are You Ready?	2016	
"N5" †	Lali	Mariana Espósito; Martín D'Agosto; Mauro De Tomasso	Lali	2022	
"Necesito"	Lali Espósito	Fernando López; Federico Montero; Paul Schwartz	Esperanza Mía	2015	
"No Digas Nada"	Lali Espósito and Agustín Sierra	Cris Morena; Carlos Nilson	Rincón de Luz	2003	
"No Estoy Sola"	Lali	Mariana Espósito; Pablo Akselrad; Luis Burgio; Gustavo Novello	A Bailar	2014	
"No Me Importa" †	Lali	Mariana Espósito; Martín D'Agosto; Mauro De Tommaso; Federico Barretobr; Isabela Teran Lieban	No Vayas a Atender Cuando el Demonio Llama	2024	
"No Hay Héroes"	Lali	Mariana Espósito; Julieta Venegas; Isabela Teran Lieban	No Vayas a Atender Cuando el Demonio Llama	2025	
"No Puedo Olvidarte"	Lali and Mau y Ricky	Mariana Espósito; Mauricio Montaner; Ricardo Montaner; Jon Leone; Camilo Echeverry; Elof Loelv	Libra	2020	
"Nochentera (Remix)" †	Vicco and Lali	Mariana Espósito; Victoria Riba; Ruben Pérez Pérez	Noctalgia (Deluxe)	2023	
"Obsesión" †	Lali	Mariana Espósito; Martín D'Agosto; Mauro De Tomasso	Lali	2023	
"OMG!"	Lali	Mariana Espósito; Pablo Akselrad; Luis Burgio; Gustavo Novello	Brava	2018	
"Pa Que Me Quieras"	Lali and Noriel	Mariana Espósito; Noel Santos Román; Juan Manuel Frías; José Robles; Juan Rubiera; Juan Santana; Ronny Frías	Libra	2020	
"Para Dos" †	La Joaqui and Lali	Mariana Espósito; Joaquinha Lerena de la Riva; Agustín Zeballos; Natalio Faingold; Raúl Federico Gómez; Nicolás Cotton	None	2025	
"Payaso"	Lali	Mariana Espósito; Martín D'Agosto; Mauro De Tommaso; Federico Barretobr; Isabela Teran Lieban; Juan Giménez Kuj	No Vayas a Atender Cuando el Demonio Llama II	2025	
"Pendeja"	Lali	Mariana Espósito; Martín D'Agosto; Mauro De Tommaso; Federico Barretobr; Isabela Teran Lieban; Juan Giménez Kuj; Mariano Napoli	No Vayas a Atender Cuando el Demonio Llama	2025	
"Perdedor"	Lali	Mariana Espósito; Martín D'Agosto; Mauro De Tommaso; Federico Barretobr; Isabela Teran Lieban; Juan Giménez Kuj	No Vayas a Atender Cuando el Demonio Llama	2025	
"Plástico" †	Lali and Duki	Mariana Espósito; Mauro Lombardo; Martín D'Agosto; Mauro De Tommaso; Federico Barretobr; Isabela Teran Lieban; Juan Giménez Kuj	No Vayas a Atender Cuando el Demonio Llama	2025	
"Prohibido (Remix)" †	CD9 featuring Lali and Ana Mena	Gustavo Novello; Felipe Ramírez; Daniel Giraldo; Edgar Barrera; Mariana Espósito; Bruno Nicolas; Luis Burgio; David Augustave; Pablo Askelrad; Andrés Restrepo; Juan P. Piedrahita; José Luis de la Peña; Julián Mejía; Johan Espinosa; Ana Mena	1.0	2018	
"Popstar"	Lali	Mariana Espósito; Martín D'Agosto; Mauro De Tommaso; Isabela Teran Lieban; Juan Giménez Kuj	No Vayas a Atender Cuando el Demonio Llama	2025	
"Por Una Sola Vez"	Lali Espósito	Cris Morena; Laurentis	24 Horas	2006	
"Puedo Ser"	Lali Espósito and María Eugenia Suárez	Fernando López; Pablo Durand; Cris Morena	Teenangels 2	2008	
"Quiénes Son?" †	Lali	Mariana Espósito; Martín D'Agosto; Mauro De Tomasso	Lali	2023	
"Quiero Salir del Paraíso"	Lali Espósito and María Eugenia Suárez	Fernando López; Pablo Durand; Cris Morena	Teenangels 4	2010	
"Quiero Todo" †	Soledad, Lali and Natalia Oreiro	Mariana Espósito; Soledad Pastorutti; Natalia Oreiro; Marcela Morelo; Rodolfo Lugo	None	2022	
"Reina"	Lali	Mariana Espósito; Pablo Akselrad; Luis Burgio; Gustavo Novello	Soy	2016	
"Revolución"	A.N.I.M.A.L. featuring Lali	Andrés Giménez; Osko Cariola	Íntimo Extremo – 30 Años	2022	
"Ring Na Na"	Lali	Michael Angelo; Eric McCarthy; Dabid Kaneswaran; Mariana Espósito; Pablo Akselrad; Luis Burgio; Gustavo Novello	Soy	2016	
"Roma-Bangkok" †	Baby K featuring Lali	Federica Abbate; Fabio Clemente; Alessandro Merli; Claudia Nahum; Rocco Pagliarulo	None	2016	
"S.O.S" †	Taichu and Lali	Mariana Espósito; Tais López Miranda; Martín D'Agosto; Mercedes Pieretti	None	2024	
"Salta La Comba" †	Pinto "Wahin" featuring Lali	Mariana Espósito; José Manuel Pinto; Salvador Bianquetti; Raúl Cabrera; Juan Manuel Leal	Del 13 al 1	2019	
"Salvaje"	Lali featuring Abraham Mateo	Mariana Espósito; Abraham Mateo; Eric Perez; Luis O'Neill; Jadan Andino; Armando Lozano; Pablo Akselrad; Luis Burgio; Gustavo Novello	Brava	2018	
"Sensacional Éxito"	Lali (Note: Though credited to Lali, "Sensacional Éxito" is a spoken interlude by Eduardo Colombo.)	Mariana Espósito; Mauro De Tommaso; Juan Giménez Kuj	No Vayas a Atender Cuando el Demonio Llama	2025	
"Siempre Brilla el Sol"	Lali Espósito	Fernando López; Federico Montero; Paul Schwartz	Esperanza Mía	2015	
"Siento"	Lali Espósito	Fernando López; Pablo Durand; Cris Morena	Teenangels 3	2009	
"Sin Querer Queriendo"	Lali featuring Mau y Ricky	Mariana Espósito; Stephen McGregor; Mauricio Montaner; Ricardo Montaner; Camilo Echeverry; Jon Leona; Pablo Akselrad; Luis Burgio; Gustavo Novello	Brava and Para Aventuras y Curiosidades	2018	
"Sola"	Lali	Mariana Espósito; Martín D'Agosto; Mauro De Tomasso	Lali	2023	
"Solo" †	Willy William, will.i.am and Lali	Mariana Espósito; Willy William; William Adams; Phil Greiss; Amy Perez	None	2022	
"Somos Amantes" †	Lali	Mariana Espósito; Pablo Akselrad; Luis Burgio; Gustavo Novello	Brava	2018	
"Somos Uno"	Lali Espósito	Franco Baruzzi; Inés Oliveiro; Emilio Oliveiro; Sebastián Miras; Juan José Leive	None	2013	
"Soy" †	Lali	Mariana Espósito; Pablo Akselrad; Luis Burgio; Gustavo Novello	Soy	2016	
"Soy de Volar" †	Dvicio and Lali	Antonio Escobar Núñez; Juan José Martín; Martín Ceballos; Yoby Zuñiga	Impulso (Edición Aniversario)	2020	
"Supersónico"	Ca7riel & Paco Amoroso and Lali	Mariana Espósito; Catriel Guerreiro; Ulises Guerreiro; Gino Borri; Luis Miguel Gómez; Manuel Lorente Freire	Baño María	2024	
"Taste the Feeling"	Lali	—	None	2017	
"Te Siento"	Lali	Mariana Espósito; Pablo Akselrad; Luis Burgio; Gustavo Novello	A Bailar	2014	
"Tengo Esperanza"	Lali Espósito	María Florencia Ciarlo; Eduardo Frigerio; Federico San Millán; Paul Schwartz	Esperanza Mía	2015	
"Todo a Pulmón" †	Alejandro Lerner featuring Abel Pintos, Axel, Lali, León Gieco, Rolando Sartorio, Sandra Mihanovich and Soledad	Alejandro Lerner	None	2018	
"Tu Revolución"	Lali	Mariana Espósito; Pablo Akselrad; Luis Burgio; Gustavo Novello	Soy	2016	
"Tu Sonrisa"	Lali	Mariana Espósito; Pablo Akselrad; Luis Burgio; Gustavo Novello	Brava	2017	
"Tu Novia" †	Lali	Mariana Espósito; Pablo Akselrad; Luis Burgio; Gustavo Novello	Brava	2017	
"Tu Novia II"	Lali	Mariana Espósito; Martín D'Agosto; Mauro De Tommaso; Federico Barretobr; Isabela Teran Lieban; Juan Giménez Kuj; Adrian Rodríguez; Mariano Domínguez	No Vayas a Atender Cuando el Demonio Llama	2025	
"Una Esquina en Madrid"	Lali	Mariana Espósito; Fito Páez	Libra	2020	
"Una Na" †	Lali	Mariana Espósito; Andy Clay; Pablo Akselrad; Luis Burgio; Gustavo Novello	Brava	2017	
"Una Vez Más"	Pedro Capó and Lali	Pedro Capó; Alexa Zabala; Diego Contento	La Neta	2022	
"Unico"	Lali	Mariana Espósito; Pablo Akselrad; Luis Burgio; Gustavo Novello	Soy	2016	
"Vuelve a Mí"	Lali	Mariana Espósito; Pablo Akselrad; Luis Burgio; Gustavo Novello	Brava	2018	
"Y Dale Alegría a Mi Corazón"	Lali	Fito Paez	None	2018	
"Yegua"	Lali	Adrián Dárgelos; Gabriel Manelli; Diego Rodríguez	Spotify Singles	2023	
"Yo Te Diré" †	Miranda! and Lali	Alejandro Sergi	Hotel Miranda!	2023	

== Unreleased songs ==
Unreleased songs recorded by Lali
Song	Notes	Ref.
"Amor Eterno"	Recorded for Esperanza Mía.; Duet with Mariano Martínez.; Performed live in Esperanza Mía: El Musical.; Written by Lali, Akselrad, Burgio, Novello and Schwartz.; Leaked in June 2016.	
"Bamboleante"	With MC Lan.; Written by Lali, MC Lan and Rodolfo Cabrera.; The song is currently listed on SGAE.	
"Bye"	Written by Elena Rose, Daniel Rondón and Rafael Rodríguez.; The song is currently listed on GEMA.	
"Cómo Estás?"	Intended for No Vayas a Atender Cuando el Demonio Llama.	
"Delito"	Written by Lali, Patrick Ingunza, Daniel Rondón and Rafael Rodríguez.; The song is currently listed on GEMA.	
"Disfraz"	Intended for No Vayas a Atender Cuando el Demonio Llama.	
"Ey, Dímelo!"	Intended for No Vayas a Atender Cuando el Demonio Llama.	
"Gitano"	Intended for No Vayas a Atender Cuando el Demonio Llama.	
"Grita Mi Alma"	Intended for Soy.	
"Libertad"	Intended for No Vayas a Atender Cuando el Demonio Llama.	
"Loca"	Not official song title.; Lali showed a snippet during an interview in 2018.	
"Maldición"	Intended for No Vayas a Atender Cuando el Demonio Llama.	
"Mi Religión II"	Intended for No Vayas a Atender Cuando el Demonio Llama.	
"Mil Tequilas (Remix)"	With Chema Rivas and Omar Montes.; The artists shared snippets from the studio on their social media accounts.; Lali ultimately decided not to be part of the song after finding out about Montes's allegations for domestic violence.	
"My Love"	Intended for Brava.	
"Oro"	Intended for No Vayas a Atender Cuando el Demonio Llama.	
"Sabe Que Yo Sé"	Intended for No Vayas a Atender Cuando el Demonio Llama.	
"Salir Mal"	Intended for No Vayas a Atender Cuando el Demonio Llama.	
"Siempre Serás Mi Luz"	Recorded for Esperanza Mía.; Duet with Gabriela Toscano.; Performed live in Esperanza Mía: El Musical.; Written by Lali, Akselrad, Burgio, Novello and Schwartz.; Leaked in November 2015.	
"Sin Enamorarnos"	Intended for Brava.	
"Tao"	Intended for Lali.	
"Teatro"	Intended for Libra.; Leaked online in March 2023.; Christina Aguilera recorded her own version of "Teatro" for Aguilera; however, it was also scrapped from that album.	
"Tornado"	Intended for No Vayas a Atender Cuando el Demonio Llama.	
"Ya No Voy a Actuar"	Intended for No Vayas a Atender Cuando el Demonio Llama.	

== See also ==
- Lali Espósito discography
