= Soy de Volar =

2020 single by Dvicio and Lali

Single by Dvicio and Lali

from the album Impulso (Edición Aniversario)
- Released: September 25, 2020
- Genre: Latin pop
- Length: 3:55
- Label: Sony Music Spain
- Songwriters: Antonio Escobar Núñez; Juan José Martín; Martín Ceballos; Yoby Zuñiga
- Producers: Antonio Escobar; Pablo Cebrián

Dvicio singles chronology
| "Capítulos" (2020) | "Soy de Volar" (2020) | "Epiphany" (2020) |

Lali singles chronology
| "Fascinada" (2020) | "Soy de Volar" (2020) | "Ladrón" (2020) |

Music video
- "Soy de Volar" on YouTube

"Soy de Volar" is a song by Spanish pop group Dvicio, taken from their third studio album Impulso (2020). The song was written by Antonio Escobar, Juan José Martín, Martín Ceballos and Yoby Zuñiga, and produced by Escobar and Pablo Cebrián. A duet version of "Soy de Volar" with Argentine singer Lali was released as the first single from the anniversary edition of Impulso on September 25, 2020, by Sony Music Spain.

== Background ==
"Soy de Volar" is a very romantic song that takes the group to their original sound. According to Lali, "it is a super love song that talks about encouragement." When asked by Billboard Argentina about working with Lali, Andrés Ceballos answered:

To us, Lali is a very charismatic and dope artist, and very versatile on stage, but we didn't know the impact that she had; we didn't know how much people she could move. As you know, my brother and I are half-Argentine, but we didn't grow up watching her on TV, so we didn't have that feeling that she was so present in our lives. It's incredible how, even before the song was out, her "hacker"-fans were already trying to leak it. It's incredible how hard they work; I think [collaborating with Lali] has been a hit.

== Music video ==
A music video directed by Willy Rodríguez was released on September 25, 2020, on Dvicio's YouTube channel. In the clip, Lali and Andrés Ceballos move in together. With the rest of the Dvicio members, Lali and Andrés take boxes with their stuff to their new apartment while they have fun. At the end of the video, Lali and Andrés have a romantic date and end up kissing. The video was shot using a single continuous tracking shot.

== Reception ==
=== Commercial performance ===
"Soy de Volar" debuted at number 89 on the Billboard Argentina Hot 100, where it charted for five weeks and peaked at number 80. In Spain, the song failed to chart within the PROMUSICAE Top 100 Singles chart. However, it charted within the Spotify Spain Top 200 songs chart for over eight months, and it received a gold certification by PROMUSICAE for selling over 20,000 copies in Spain.

=== Accolades ===
In 2021, "Soy de Volar" was nominated for Best Mellodic Video at the 2021 Quiero Awards.

== Charts ==
Weekly chart performance for "Soy de Volar"
| Chart (2021) | Peak position |
|---|---|
| Argentina Hot 100 (Billboard) | 80 |

== Certifications ==
Certifications for "Soy de Volar"
| Region | Certification | Certified units/sales |
|---|---|---|
| Spain (Promusicae) | Gold | 20,000^{‡} |
^{‡} Sales+streaming figures based on certification alone.
