= List of airplay number-one hits in Argentina =

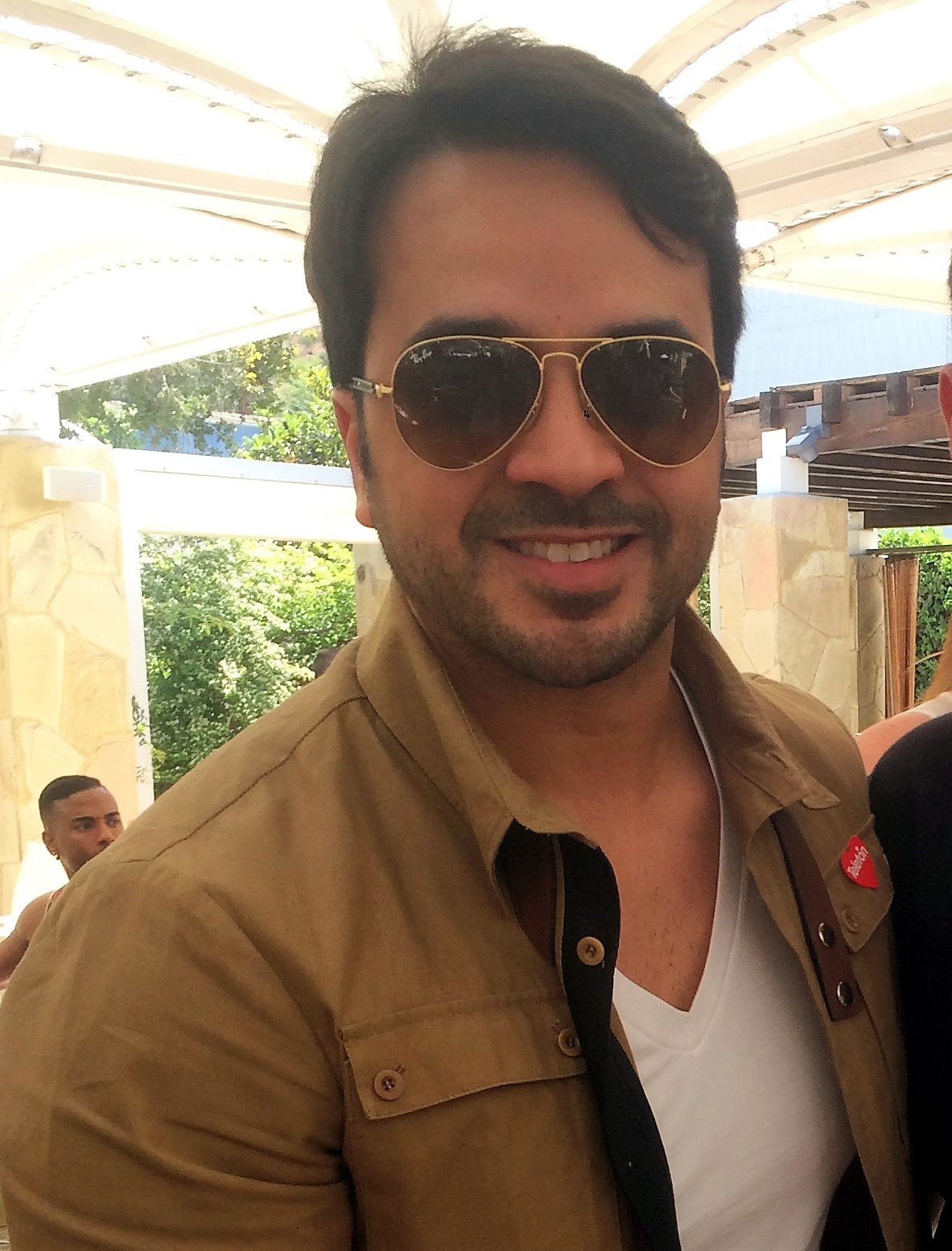
Luis Fonsi (pictured) scored two number-one singles with "Despacito" and "Échame la Culpa". The former song became the number-one song on the Monitor Latino Argentine Airplay chart of 2017.

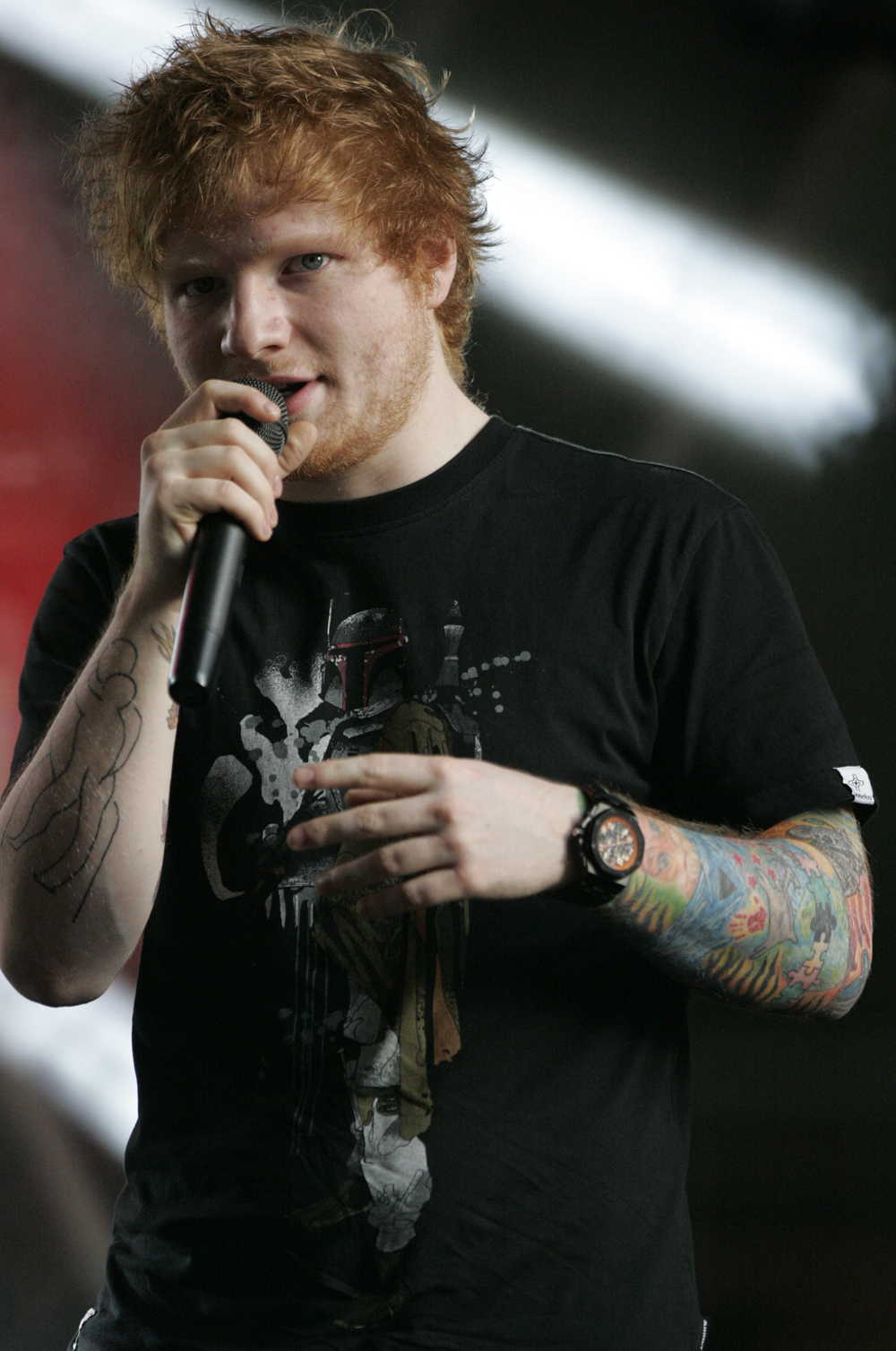
Ed Sheeran (pictured) scored his first number-one single with "Shape of You". The song became the number-one song on the Argentina Anglo Airplay chart of 2017.

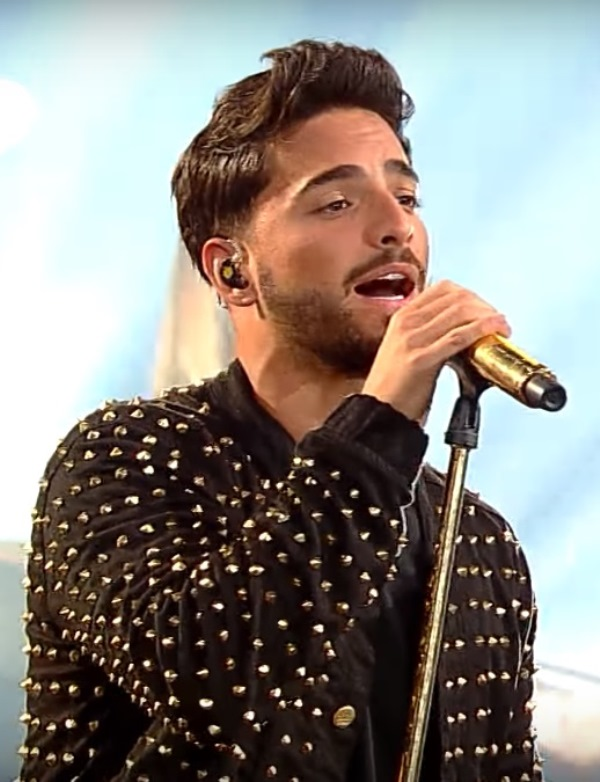
Maluma (pictured) scored the most number-one singles in 2017 with "Vente Pa' Ca", "Felices los 4" and Corazón".

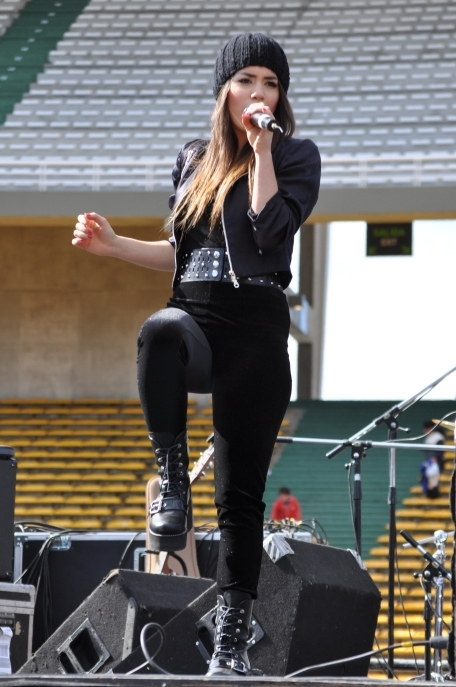
Lali (pictured) became the first-ever Argentine woman to score a number-one single on a Monitor Latino chart with "Una Na".

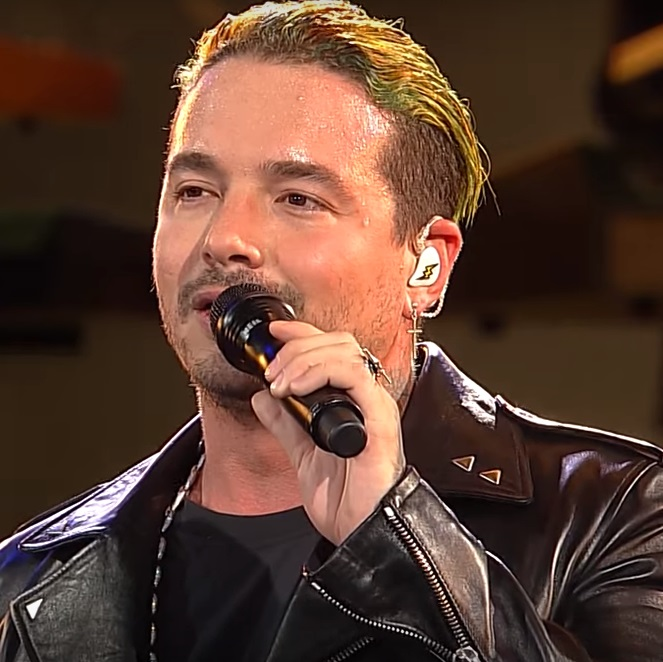
J Balvin (pictured) scored his first number-one single in Argentina with "Mi Gente".

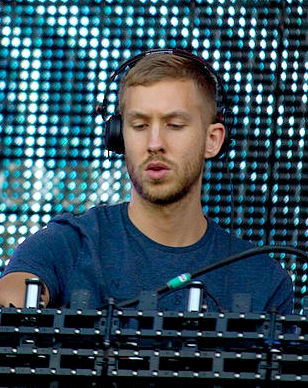
Calvin Harris (pictured) spent a total of ten weeks atop of the Argentine Anglo Airplay chart with "Feels".

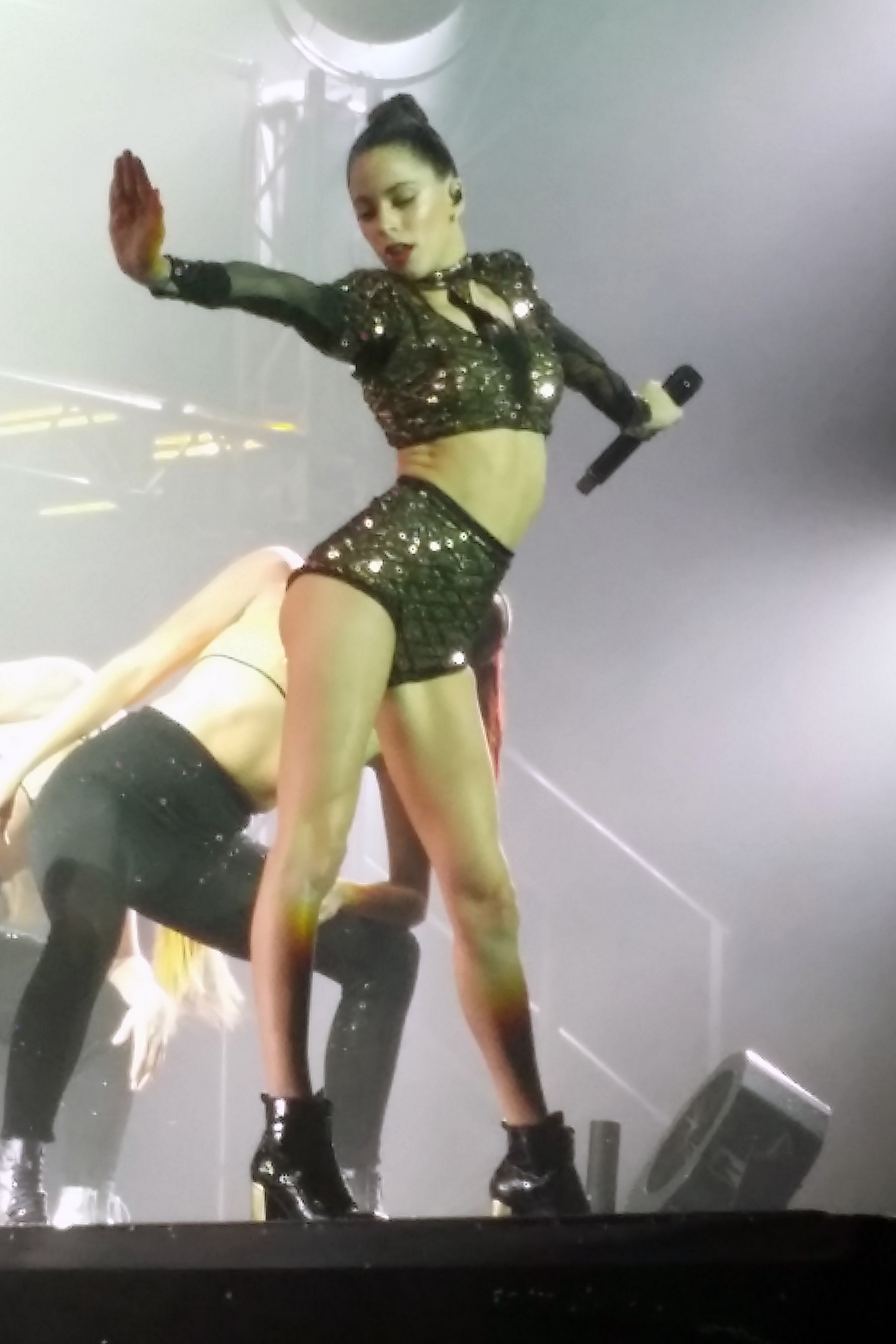
Tini (pictured) is female artist with most number-one songs on the chart.

Monitor Latino (stylised monitorLATINO) is a singles chart founded in 2003 which ranks songs on chart based on airplay across radio stations in Argentina, as in most Latin American countries and Hispanic radio stations in the United States, using the Radio Tracking Data, LLC in real time. Monitor Latino launched in Argentina in June, 2016, providing four different charts: the Argentina Top 20 (general airplay), the Argentina National Top 20 (local songs only), the Argentina Anglo Top 20 (music in English only), and the Argentina Latin Top 20 (music in Spanish only). Initially, the Argentine Monitor Latino charts were based purely on spins (the number of times a song is played). In March 2021, side charts based on audience (the number of people that listen to a song while it is being played) were also launched.

== Argentina Airplay ==
This is a list of the number-one hits from 2016 onwards on the Argentina Airplay chart, ranked by Monitor Latino.

Key
No.	nth song to top the Argentine Airplay Chart

♪ – Number-one single of the year
♪ – Number-one single of the following year

=== Spins ===
No.	Artist	Single	Reached number one	Weeks at number one	Ref.
2016
1	Justin Timberlake	"Can't Stop the Feeling!"	6 June 2016	19	
2	DNCE	"Cake by the Ocean"	13 June 2016	1	
3	Bruno Mars	"24K Magic"	24 October 2016	14	
2017
4	Ricky Martin featuring Maluma	"Vente Pa' Ca"	30 January 2017	1	
5	Luis Fonsi and Daddy Yankee featuring Justin Bieber (Note: Justin Bieber started being credited as a featured artist from the week of April 24, 2017.)	"Despacito" ♪	6 February 2017	22	
6	Maluma	"Felices Los 4"	10 July 2017	14	
7	J Balvin and Willy William featuring Beyoncé	"Mi Gente (Remix)"	9 October 2017	5	
8	Shakira featuring Nicky Jam	"Perro Fiel"	20 November 2017	1	
9	Luis Fonsi and Demi Lovato	"Échame la Culpa"	27 November 2017	18	
10	Maluma featuring Nego do Borel	"Corazón"	4 December 2017	2	
2018
11	Camila Cabello featuring Young Thug	"Havana" ♪	16 April 2018	3	
12	Daddy Yankee	"Dura"	7 May 2018	4	
13	Reik featuring Ozuna and Wisin	"Me Niego"	4 June 2018	10	
14	Los Auténticos Decadentes featuring Mon Laferte	"Amor"	13 August 2018	17	
15	Luis Fonsi and Stefflon Don	"Calypso"	17 September 2018	2	
16	Reik and Maluma	"Amigos con Derechos"	29 October 2018	2	
17	Paulo Londra	"Adán y Eva"	10 December 2018	1	
2019
18	Pedro Capó and Farruko (Note: Farruko started being credited as artist from the week of February 11, 2019.)	"Calma" ♪	14 January 2019	25	
19	Daddy Yankee featuring Snow	"Con Calma"	8 July 2019	2	
20	Shawn Mendes and Camila Cabello	"Señorita"	22 July 2019	12	
21	Camilo, Pedro Capó and Shakira (Note: Shakira started being credited as artist from the week of October 21, 2019.)	"Tutu"	30 September 2019	18	
2020
22	Karol G and Nicki Minaj	"Tusa" ♪	3 February 2020	18	
23	Camilo	"Favorito"	1 June 2020	7	
24	Tini and Khea	"Ella Dice"	20 July 2020	3	
25	Rauw Alejandro and Camilo	"Tattoo (Remix)"	10 August 2020	1	
26	Maluma	"Hawái"	17 August 2020	8	
27	Camilo	"Vida de Rico"	19 October 2020	5	
28	Ache featuring Anonimus	"Malditos Celos"	23 November 2020	10	
2021
29	Sebastián Yatra and Guaynaa	"Chica Ideal"	1 February 2021	6	
30	Camilo featuring El Alfa	"Bebé"	15 March 2021	3	
31	The Weeknd	"Save Your Tears"	5 April 2021	2	
32	Carlos Vives and Ricky Martin	"Canción Bonita"	19 April 2021	1	
33	Tini and María Becerra	"Miénteme"	3 May 2021	7	
34	Rauw Alejandro	"Todo de Ti" ♪	21 June 2021	10	
35	Nio Garcia	"Tus Poses"	23 August 2021	1	
36	Tini and Manuel Turizo	"Maldita Foto"	30 August 2021	5	
37	Ed Sheeran	"Bad Habits"	4 October 2021	1	
38	Camilo and Evaluna Montaner	"Indigo"	18 October 2021	12	
39	Sebastián Yatra	"Tacones Rojos" ♪	8 November 2021	5	
2022
40	Emil and Ir Sais	"Asi No Vale"	7 February 2022	3	
41	Ozuna	"Deprimida"	7 March 2022	3	
42	Tini and Beéle	"Fantasi"	14 March 2022	2	
43	Paulo Londra	"Plan A"	28 March 2022	1	
44	Harry Styles	"As It Was"	18 April 2022	7	
45	Shakira and Rauw Alejandro	"Te Felicito"	6 June 2022	10	
46	Lali	"N5"	25 July 2022	1	
47	Rosalía	"Despechá"	22 August 2022	16	
48	Ozuna and Feid	"Hey Mor"	21 November 2022	3	
49	La Mosca Tsé - Tsé	"Muchachos, Ahora Nos Volvimos a Ilusionar"	12 December 2022	1	
2023
50	Ovy on the Drums and Ozuna	"Chao Bebe"	9 January 2023	4	
51	Miley Cyrus	"Flowers" ♪	6 February 2023	6	
52	Tini	"Cupido"	20 March 2023	2	
53	Karol G and Shakira	"TQG"	3 April 2023	6	
54	Lali	"Obsesión"	15 May 2023	1	
55	Sebastián Yatra, Manuel Turizo and Beéle	"Vagabundo"	22 May 2023	6	
56	Shakira and Manuel Turizo	"Copa Vacía"	3 July 2023	6	
57	Dua Lipa	"Dance the Night"	7 August 2023	2	
58	Los Ángeles Azules and María Becerra	"El Amor de Mi Vida"	28 August 2023	7	
59	Enrique Iglesias and María Becerra	"Así Es La Vida"	16 October 2023	4	
60	Emilia and Tini	"La Original"	13 November 2023	11*	
61	Ozuna	"Baccarat"	4 December 2023	3	

=== Audience ===
No.	Artist	Single	Reached number one	Weeks at number one	Ref.
2021
1	Harry Styles	"Golden"	22 March 2021	2	
2	The Weeknd	"Save Your Tears" ♪	29 March 2021	11	
3	Rauw Alejandro	"Todo de Ti"	21 June 2021	9	
4	Ed Sheeran	"Bad Habits"	23 August 2021	15	
5	Camilo and Evaluna Montaner	"Indigo"	1 November 2021	3	
6	Sebastián Yatra	"Tacones Rojos"	15 November 2021	6	
2022 (Note: The year-end number one of 2022 was "Mon Amour" by Zzoilo and Aitana despite never placing number one on the weekly chart.)
7	Elton John and Dua Lipa	"Cold Heart (Pnau Remix)"	24 January 2022	5	
8	Tini and Beéle	"Fantasi"	14 March 2022	2	
9	Ricky Martin	"Otra Noche en L.A."	28 March 2022	1	
10	Harry Styles	"As It Was"	4 April 2022	19	
11	Lizzo	"About Damn Time"	15 August 2022	1	
12	Rosalía	"Despechá"	22 August 2022	16	
13	Manuel Turizo	"La Bachata"	17 October 2022	5	
2023
14	Bizarrap and Shakira	"Shakira: Bzrp Music Sessions, Vol. 53"	16 January 2023	1	
15	Miley Cyrus	"Flowers" ♪	23 January 2023	24	
16	Lit Killah, Tiago PZK, María Becerra, Duki, Emilia, Rusherking, Big One and FMK	"Los del Espacio"	10 July 2023	3	
17	Dua Lipa	"Dance the Night"	17 July 2023	8	
18	Los Ángeles Azules and María Becerra	"El Amor de Mi Vida"	25 September 2023	1	
19	Diego Torres	"Mejor Que Ayer"	2 October 2023	2	
20	Quevedo	"Columbia"	16 October 2023	1	
21	Enrique Iglesias and María Becerra	"Así Es La Vida"	23 October 2023	3	
22	María Becerra, Chencho Corleone and Ovy on the Drums	"Piscina"	13 November 2023	2	
23	Emilia and Tini	"La Original"	27 November 2023	11	
2024
24	Ariana Grande	"Yes, And?"	12 February 2024	1*	

== Argentina National Songs ==
This is a list of the number-one Argentine hits of the 2010s on the Argentina National Airplay chart, ranked by Monitor Latino.

Key
No.	nth song to top the Argentine Airplay Chart

♪ – Number-one single of the year
♪ – Number-one single of the following year

=== Spins ===
No.	Artist	Single	Reached number one	Weeks at number one	Ref.
2016
1	Babasónicos	"Bambi"	6 June 2016	1	
2	Maxi Trusso	"Streets of Rock & Roll"	13 June 2016	9	
3	Estelares	"Es El Amor"	25 July 2016	13	
4	Los Cafres	"Se Q' El Mar"	26 September 2016	1	
5	Maxi Trusso	"Make You Mine" ♪	21 November 2016	21	
2017
6	Chano!	"Carnavalintro"	13 February 2017	1	
7	Miranda!	"Quiero Vivir a Tu Lado"	15 May 2017	2	
8	Maxi Trusso	"Always a Reason"	29 May 2017	2	
9	Chano!	"Naistumichiu"	3 July 2017	9	
10	Estelares	"Alas Rotas"	24 July 2017	1	
11	Lali	"Una Na"	11 September 2017	6	
12	Luciano Pereyra	"Como Tu" ♪	23 October 2017	26	
2018
13	Luciano Pereyra	"Qué Suerte Tiene Él"	23 April 2018	11	
14	Tini and Karol G	"Princesa"	7 May 2018	4	
15	Los Auténticos Decadentes featuring Mon Laferte	"Amor"	6 August 2018	21	
16	Paulo Londra	"Adán y Eva"	10 December 2018	18	
2019
17	Diego Torres	"Esa Mujer"	6 May 2019	1	
18	Tini and Greeicy	"22" ♪	13 May 2019	19	
19	MYA and Pedro Capó	"Te Olvidaré"	23 September 2019	4	
20	Tini and Lalo Ebratt	"Fresa"	14 October 2019	5	
20	Vicentico	"Freak"	14 October 2019	1	
22	Lali	"Laligera"	21 October 2019	1	
23	Luciano Pereyra and Geeicy	"Te Estás Enamorando de Mí"	18 November 2019	2	
24	Lali featuring CNCO	"Como Así"	9 December 2019	11	
2020
25	Tini and Mau y Ricky	"Recuerdo" ♪	24 February 2020	14	
26	Lali	"Lo Que Tengo Yo"	1 June 2020	7	
27	TINI and Khea	"Ella Dice"	20 July 2020	12	
28	Abel Pintos	"Piedra Libre"	5 October 2020	2	
29	Tini featuring John C	"Duele"	26 October 2020	1	
30	Tini and Alejandro Sanz	"Un Beso en Madrid"	2 November 2020	11	
31	Lali and Cazzu	"Ladrón"	23 November 2020	1	
2021
32	Nicki Nicole, Dread Mar I and Bizarrap	"Verte"	11 January 2021	8	
33	Fito Páez featuring Lali	"Gente en la Calle"	15 March 2021	1	
34	Diego Torres and Fonseca	"Este Corazón"	22 March 2021	3	
35	Nicki Nicole and Lunay	"No Toque Mi Naik"	12 April 2021	2	
36	Yas Gagliardi	"Lo Primero"	19 April 2021	1	
37	Tini and María Becerra	"Miénteme" ♪	3 May 2021	16	
38	Tini and Manuel Turizo	"Maldita Foto"	23 August 2021	11	
39	Los Auténticos Decadentes and Natalia Lafourcade	"Golpes en el Corazón"	8 November 2021	1	
40	Tini and L-Gante	"Bar"	15 November 2021	13*	
2022 (Note: The year-end number one of 2022 was "Vivir Así Es Morir de Amor" by Nathy Peluso despite never placing number one on the weekly chart.)
41	Trueno	"Dance Crip"	14 February 2022	1	
42	Tini and Beéle	"Fantasi"	21 February 2022	6	
43	Paulo Londra	"Plan A"	28 March 2022	3	
44	Abel Pintos and Francisca Valenzuela	"Abrazándonos"	18 April 2022	2	
45	Tini	"La Triple T"	9 May 2022	9	
46	María Becerra	"Ojalá"	11 July 2022	1	
47	Lali	"N5"	18 July 2022	5	
48	Bizarrap and Quevedo	"Bzrp Music Sessions, Vol. 52"	22 August 2022	17	
49	María Becerra	"Automático"	31 October 2022	1	
50	La Mosca Tsé - Tsé	"Muchachos, Ahora Nos Volvimos a Ilusionar"	12 December 2022	1	
2023
51	Nicki Nicole	"Frío"	2 January 2023	1	
52	Bizarrap and Shakira	"Bzrp Music Sessions, Vol. 53" ♪	9 January 2023	10	
53	Tini	"Cupido"	20 March 2023	5	
54	Lali	"Obsesión"	24 April 2023	7	
55	Lit Killah, Duki, Emilia, Tiago PZK, FMK, Rusherking, María Becerra and Big One	"Los del Espacio"	5 June 2023	13	
56	Diego Torres	"Mejor Que Ayer"	4 September 2023	8	
57	Emilia and Tini	"La Original"	6 November 2023	15*	

=== Audience ===
No.	Artist	Single	Reached number one	Weeks at number one	Ref.
2021
1	Diego Torres and Fonseca	"Este Corazón"	22 March 2021	4	
2	Tini and Alejandro Sanz	"Un Beso en Madrid"	29 March 2021	1	
3	Nicki Nicole and Lunay	"No Toque Mi Naik"	26 April 2021	1	
4	Tini and María Becerra	"Miénteme" ♪	3 May 2021	16	
5	Tini and Manuel Turizo	"Maldita Foto"	23 August 2021	7	
6	Los Auténticos Decadentes and Natalia Lafourcade	"Golpes en el Corazón"	11 October 2021	9	
7	Nicki Nicole	"Baby"	1 November 2021	1	
8	Tini and L-Gante	"Bar"	22 November 2021	1	
9	MYA and Emilia	"BB"	27 December 2021	8	
2022 (Note: The year-end number one of 2022 was "Para Sentirme Libre" by Diego Torres and Natiruts featuring Rayko B despite never placing number one on the weekly chart.)
10	Tini and Beéle	"Fantasi"	21 February 2022	10	
11	Paulo Londra	"Plan A"	25 April 2022	2	
12	Tini	"La Triple T"	9 May 2022	8	
13	María Becerra	"Ojalá"	4 July 2022	2	
14	Lali	"N5"	18 July 2022	3	
15	Bizarrap and Quevedo	"Bzrp Music Sessions, Vol. 52"	8 August 2022	22	
2023
16	Bizarrap and Shakira	"Bzrp Music Sessions, Vol. 53" ♪	9 January 2023	12	
17	Tini	"Cupido"	27 March 2023	3	
18	Lali	"Obsesión"	24 April 2023	7	
19	Lit Killah, Duki, Emilia, Tiago PZK, FMK, Rusherking, María Becerra and Big One	"Los del Espacio"	5 June 2023	13	
20	Diego Torres	"Mejor Que Ayer"	4 September 2023	8	
21	Emilia and Tini	"La Original"	6 November 2023	12	
22	María Becerra, Chencho Corleone and Ovy on the Drums	"Piscina"	13 November 2023	2	
2024
23	Luck Ra and Khea	"Hola Perdida"	12 February 2024	1*	

== Argentina Anglo Airplay ==
This is a list of the number-one English-language hits of the 2010s on the Argentina Anglo chart, ranked by Monitor Latino.

Key
No.	nth song to top the Argentine Airplay Chart

=== Spins ===
♪ – Number-one single of the year
♪ – Number-one single of the following year

No.	Artist	Single	Reached number one	Weeks at number one	Ref.
2016
1	Justin Timberlake	"Can't Stop the Feeling!"	6 June 2016	19	
2	DNCE	"Cake by the Ocean"	13 June 2016	1	
3	Bruno Mars	"24K Magic"	24 October 2016	20	
2017
4	Ed Sheeran	"Shape of You" ♪	13 March 2017	25	
5	Calvin Harris featuring Pharrell Williams, Katy Perry and Big Sean	"Feels"	21 August 2017	10	
6	Maroon 5 featuring SZA	"What Lovers Do"	13 November 2017	3	
7	Camila Cabello featuring Young Thug	"Havana" ♪	4 December 2017	31	
2018
8	Calvin Harris and Dua Lipa	"One Kiss"	25 June 2018	6	
9	Becky G and Paulo Londra	"Cuando Te Besé"	20 August 2018	10	
10	DJ Snake featuring Selena Gomez, Ozuna and Cardi B	"Taki Taki"	29 October 2018	26	
2019
11	Jonas Brothers	"Sucker"	25 March 2019	2	
12	Madonna and Maluma	"Medellín"	29 April 2019	1	
13	BTS featuring Halsey	"Boy with Luv"	13 May 2019	1	
14	Ed Sheeran and Justin Bieber	"I Don't Care"	20 May 2019	5	
15	Taylor Swift featuring Brendon Urie	"Me!"	3 June 2019	2	
16	Shawn Mendes and Camila Cabello	"Señorita" ♪	8 July 2019	22	
17	The Black Eyed Peas and J Balvin	"Ritmo (Bad Boys for Life)"	9 December 2019	9	
2020
18	Tones and I	"Dance Monkey" ♪	10 February 2020	19	
19	Lady Gaga and Ariana Grande	"Rain on Me"	22 June 2020	1	
20	The Weeknd	"Blinding Lights"	6 July 2020	8	
21	BTS	"Dynamite"	31 August 2020	26	
2021
22	The Weeknd	"Save Your Tears" ♪	1 March 2021	18	
23	Ed Sheeran	"Bad Habits"	5 July 2021	15	
24	Coldplay and BTS	"My Universe"	18 October 2021	9	
25	Elton John and Dua Lipa	"Cold Heart (Pnau Remix)"	15 November 2021	11	
2022
26	Camila Cabello featuring Ed Sheeran	"Bam Bam"	14 March 2022	4	
27	Harry Styles	"As It Was" ♪	11 April 2022	30	
28	Harry Styles	"Late Night Talking"	11 April 2022	3	
29	Harry Styles	"Music for a Sushi Restaurant"	28 November 2022	2	
30	Taylor Swift	"Anti-Hero"	12 December 2022	4	
2023
31	David Guetta and Bebe Rexha	"I'm Good (Blue)"	9 January 2023	1	
32	Miley Cyrus	"Flowers" ♪	16 January 2023	21	
33	Dua Lipa	"Dance the Night"	12 June 2023	22	
34	Dua Lipa	"Houdini"	13 November 2023	14*	

=== Audience ===
No.	Artist	Single	Reached number one	Weeks at number one	Ref.
2021
1	Harry Styles	"Golden"	22 March 2021	2	
2	The Weeknd	"Save Your Tears" ♪	29 March 2021	17	
3	Ed Sheeran	"Bad Habits"	2 August 2021	27	
2022
4	Elton John and Dua Lipa	"Cold Heart (Pnau Remix)"	24 January 2022	5	
5	Camila Cabello featuring Ed Sheeran	"Bam Bam"	14 March 2022	3	
6	Harry Styles	"As It Was" ♪	4 April 2022	26	
7	Lizzo	"About Damn Time"	15 August 2022	9	
8	Harry Styles	"Late Night Talking"	5 September 2022	3	
9	Taylor Swift	"Anti-Hero"	19 December 2022	1	
2023
10	Harry Styles	"Music for a Sushi Restaurant"	2 January 2023	2	
11	Miley Cyrus	"Flowers" ♪	16 January 2023	25	
12	Dua Lipa	"Dance the Night"	10 July 2023	18	
13	Dua Lipa	"Houdini"	13 November 2023	11	
2024
14	Ariana Grande	"Yes, And?"	29 January 2024	3*	
