= Gente en la Calle =

2021 single by Fito Páez and Lali

Single by Fito Páez featuring Lali

from the album La Conquista del Espacio
- Released: March 4, 2021
- Studio: Capitol (Los Angeles)
- Genre: Latin pop; rock en español; gospel
- Length: 3:59
- Label: Sony Music Argentina
- Songwriter: Fito Páez
- Producers: Fito Páez; Diego Olivera; Gustavo Borner

Fito Páez singles chronology
"Maelström" (2020)	"Gente en la Calle" (2021)	"Lo Mejor de Nuestras Vidas" (2021)

Lali singles chronology
"Ladrón" (2020)	"Gente en la Calle" (2021)	"Disciplina" (2022)

Music video
- "Gente en la Calle" on YouTube

"Gente en la Calle" (English: "People in the Streets") is a song by Argentine singer-songwriter Fito Páez featuring vocals by Argentine singer Lali, from Páez's twenty-fourth studio album La Conquista del Espacio (2020). It was written by Páez and its producers Diego Olivero and Gustavo Borner. The track was released by Sony Music Argentina as the album's fourth single on March 4, 2021.

In 2021, the song received a nomination for the Collaboration of the Year award at the 23rd Annual Gardel Awards.

== Background ==
The artists' relationship developed through the years as each of them showed interest in each other's work. In 2018, Lali covered Paez's 1990 song "Y Dale Alegría a Mi Corazón". Lali's version was part of a Spotify campaign in which some artists released songs in support of their homecountries' national football teams on the 2018 FIFA World Cup.

Moreover, Páez invited Lali to perform his song "Yo Vengo a Ofrecer Mi Corazón" with him in two occasions: the first time in 2018 at Teatro Gran Rex, Buenos Aires, and the second in 2019 at the Fillmore Theatre, Miami.

In 2020, Lali released her fourth studio album, Libra, which had Páez as songwriter and background vocalist of the last track, "Una Esquina en Madrid". According to Lali, she sent the lyrics to Páez after having written the song. In return, he sent her a video of himself "finding the melody" of the song in a piano.

== Composition ==
In an interview with Billboard, Páez compared the song to Steely Dan's music, one of his favorite groups, and said that it is "melodically very difficult". He added that:

"[the song] talks about something very awful that’s happening here in Buenos Aires, but also in Los Angeles and Bogota, Lima, Rio de Janeiro. There are a lot of people living and sleeping in the streets in very marginal conditions. And this song is a way of telling that. The song is not three-dimensional. It’s two people walking through the city and telling us what they see. So, there’s no political undertones here. It’s a faithful reflection of reality. So, it has this duality where the song pleasantly floats, yet the lyrics are harsh. This was the experiment I wanted to do: That with beautiful music you can tell terrible things".

== Music video ==
A music video directed by Guido Adler and Alejandro Ros premiered on March 4, 2021. In the clip, Lali and Páez interact in a street-like set with huge traffic lights in front of screens that project real-life images of Buenos Aires and people living in its streets.

== Charts ==
=== Weekly charts ===
Chart (2020)	Peak position
Argentina Hot 100 (Billboard)	80
Argentina Airplay (Monitor Latino)	14
Argentina Latin Airplay (Monitor Latino)	11
Argentina National Songs (Monitor Latino)	1

=== Year-end charts ===
Chart (2021)	Position
Argentina (Monitor Latino)	81
Argentina Latin Airplay (Monitor Latino)	61

== See also ==
- List of airplay number-one hits in Argentina
