= The Accused (2018 film) =

2018 film

- Theatrical release poster
- Spanish: Acusada
- Directed by: Gonzalo Tobal
- Screenplay by: Ulises Porra; Gonzalo Tobal
- Produced by: Hugo Sigman; Leticia Cristi; Benjamín Doménech; Santiago Gallelli; Axel Kuschevatzky; Matías Mosteirín; Matias Roveda
- Starring: Lali Espósito; Gael García Bernal; Leonardo Sbaraglia; Inés Estévez; Daniel Fanego; Gerardo Romano
- Cinematography: Fernando Lockett
- Edited by: Alejandro Carrillo Penovi
- Music by: Rogelio Sosa
- Production companies: K&S Films; Rei Cine; Kramer & Sigman Films; PIANO; Sam Spiegel International Film Lab; Telefe
- Distributed by: Warner Bros. Pictures
- Release dates: 4 September 2018 (Venice); 13 September 2018 (Argentina)
- Running time: 114 minutes
- Countries: Argentina; Mexico
- Language: Spanish
- Box office: $1.6 million

The Accused (Spanish: Acusada) is a 2018 Argentine crime-thriller film directed by Gonzalo Tobal. It premiered at the 75th Venice International Film Festival on 4 September and was released in Argentina on 13 September by Warner Bros. Pictures. The film has received critical acclaim, with praise for Lali Espósito's performance.

== Plot ==
Dolores lived the life of a higher-class student until her best friend was found brutally murdered. Two years later, she's the only indicted suspect for a crime that attracts a lot of media attention and has placed her in the center of the public eye.

Dolores spends her days preparing for the trial, secluded in her house as her parents work as a team ready to do anything to defend their daughter. The best lawyer is not enough, they obsessively control around her: how she looks, what she does, eats and who she sees.

But as the trial moves forward and pressure grows, suspicion and secrets emerge within the family. Cornered, increasingly isolated and just when any mistake could prove disastrous, Dolores puts the entire strategy at risk.

== Cast ==
- Lali Espósito as Dolores Dreier
- Leonardo Sbaraglia as Luis Dreier, Dolores' father
- Inés Estévez as Betina Dreier, Dolores' mother
- Daniel Fanego as Ignacio Larocca, Dolores' lawyer
- Gerardo Romano as Dr. Taboada, a public prosecutor
- Emilio Vodanovich as Martin Dreier, Dolores' younger brother
- Martina Campos as Flo, Dolores' friend
- Lautaro Rodriguez as Lucas, Dolores' friend and lover
- Gael García Bernal as Mario Elmo, a popular talk-show host
- Ana Garibaldi as Marisa Nieves, the victim's mother
- Daniel Campomenosi as Rodolfo, the victim's stepfather

== Release ==
The Accused had its world premiere on 4 September 2018 at the 75th Venice International Film Festival, where it was selected as one of twenty-one films to compete for the Golden Lion award. In the following months, the film also screened at multiple film festivals, including the 2018 Toronto International Film Festival, the 23rd Busan International Film Festival, and Morelia International Film Festival, and the Miami International Film Festival. The film was released in Argentina on 13 September by Warner Bros. Pictures, and eventually in France, Greece, Mexico, Serbia and Uruguay.

== Reception ==
On review aggregator website Rotten Tomatoes, The Accused holds an approval rating of 90% based on 10 reviews. On Argentine review aggregator website Todas Las Críticas, the film has a weighted average score of 68 out of 100, based on 38 positive and 5 negative critics.

Jay Weissberg of Variety gave the film a positive review, saying "[The Accused] is solid, straightforward storytelling, certain to do well in Spanish-speaking territories and perhaps beyond." He also singled out Espósito's performance, saying "[she] refuses to cater to expectations, resulting in a performance of unexpected ambiguity, more sensed than spelled out." In his review for Screen International, Stephen Witty described it as "a quietly engrossing drama [...] of slowly dawning discoveries", and commented on Fernando Lockett's cinematography, calling it "intimate, close-up and even, occasionally, claustrophobic." Cinema Scope's Diego Brodersen highlighted Espósito's performance, saying that "[she] is quite convincing as the main character: in some instances, she seems fragile; at other times, manipulative traits surface, and with them the possibility that she could be a very good liar."

=== Accolades ===
Award	Date of ceremony	Category	Recipient(s)	Result	Ref(s)
Venice Film Festival	8 September 2018	Main Competition (Golden Lion)	The Accused	Nominated	
Platino Awards	12 May 2019	Best Actress	Lali Espósito	Proposed	
