= Como Así =

2019 single by Lali featuring CNCO

Single by Lali featuring CNCO

from the album Libra
- Released: November 8, 2019
- Recorded: 2019
- Genre: Pop-dembow
- Length: 3:04
- Label: Sony Argentina
- Songwriters: Mariana Espósito; Jowan Espinosa; Juan Manuel Frias; Yoel Henriquez; Pablo Preciado; Andrés Restrepo
- Producers: Jowan Espinosa; Rolo

Lali singles chronology
"Laligera" (2019)	"Como Así" (2019)	"Salta La Comba" (2019)

CNCO singles chronology
"Me Necesita" (2019)	"Como Asi" (2019)	"Honey Boo" (2020)

Music video
- "Como Así" on YouTube

"Como Así" (English: "How So?" or "What Do You Mean?") is a song by Argentine singer Lali featuring boyband CNCO, released as the second single from her fourth studio album, Libra (2020). Written by Lali, Brasa, Yoel Henriquez, Pablo Preciado, along with its producers Jowan Espinosa and Rolo, the song was released on November 8, 2019 through Sony Music Argentina.

The song was voted Best Latin Collaboration of 2019 by Billboard readers.

== Background and composition ==
The collaboration was born after Lali and CNCO co-hosted the 2019 Premios Juventud. Lyrically, "Como Así" was described as "a heartfelt track about a couple who, despite calling it quits, can't fathom the fact that they have broken up and are unable to move on". The song kicks off with romantic guitar riffs before dropping a catchy pop-dembow melody.

== Accolades ==
Year	Organization	Award	Result	Ref.
2020	Gardel Awards	Collaboration of the Year	Nominated	
2021	Lo Nuestro Awards	Pop Collaboration of the Year	Nominated	

== Music video ==
Filmed in Mexico City and directed by Joaquín Cambre, the music video made its debut the same night "Como Así" was released. In the clip, Lali portrays the love interest for each of the CNCO members, with each scene telling a different story.

== Charts ==
=== Weekly charts ===
Chart (2019–20)	Peak position
Argentina Hot 100 (Billboard)	33
Argentina Airplay (Monitor Latino)	4
Argentina National Songs (Monitor Latino)	1
Chile Pop (Monitor Latino)	12
Dominican Republic Pop (Monitor Latino)	8
Ecuador Pop (Monitor Latino)	14
Panama Pop (Monitor Latino)	16
Paraguay (SGP)	78
Paraguay Pop (Monitor Latino)	14
Peru Pop (Monitor Latino)	15
Uruguay Latin (Monitor Latino)	15

=== Year-end charts ===
Chart (2020)	Position
Argentina Airplay (Monitor Latino)	20
Argentina Latin Airplay (Monitor Latino)	14
Dominican Republic Pop (Monitor Latino)	31
Ecuador Pop (Monitor Latino)	86
Paraguay Pop (Monitor Latino)	52
Peru Pop (Monitor Latino)	83
Uruguay (Monitor Latino)	75
Uruguay Latin (Monitor Latino)	67

== See also ==
- List of airplay number-one hits in Argentina
