= Ladrón (song) =

2020 single by Lali and Cazzu

Single by Lali and Cazzu

from the album Libra
- Released: November 12, 2020
- Genre: Latin pop; urban pop; reggaeton
- Length: 3:19
- Label: Sony Argentina
- Songwriters: Mariana Espósito; Julieta Cazzuchelli; Daniel Real; Enzo Sauthier
- Producer: Big One

Lali singles chronology
"Soy de Volar" (2020)	"Ladrón" (2020)	"Gente en la Calle" (2021)

Cazzu singles chronology
"Cama Vacía" (2020)	"Ladrón" (2020)	"Solita (Remix)" (2020)

Music video
- "Ladrón" on YouTube

"Ladrón" (English: "Thief") is a song by Argentine singer Lali and Argentine rapper Cazzu, from Lali's fourth studio album, Libra (2020). It was written by Lali, Cazzu, FMK and its producer Big One. Through Sony Music Argentina, the song was released exactly one hour before Lali surprise-released Libra on November 12, 2020.

Lali and Cazzu are often referred to as the maximum exponents of pop and trap, respectively, in Argentina's music scene, what created high expectations and anticipation for the song. The song received an award for Song of the Year at the 23rd Annual Gardel Awards.

== Background and composition ==
"Ladrón" is an urban pop song that explores the themes of female empowerment. Lali and Cazzu start-off narrating how someone has "stolen" their feelings but soon disappeared and left them heart-broken. However, when this "thief" was to return to the singer's lives, they have already moved on and now are the ones who have advantage over their ex-lover, so they will make him pay for what he did in the past. When asked by Jessica Roiz for Billboard to comment on the song, Lali answered:

This is a collaboration with Cazzu, a woman I admire and love what she does. From the lyrics to the aesthetic of the video, it sends a clear message that women have masculine and feminine strength within themselves. Musically, the song was made by all Argentineans and has the perfect fusion of pop and urban that defines the album.

On November 4, 2020, Lali teased the song by posting a video to her Instagram account. In the video, a female figure that was not Lali was recognized, creating expectations and rumors as to who this mysterious figure was. The following day, both singers confirmed the rumors as they posted the single cover to their social media accounts and announced the release date. The song was ultimately released on November 12, 2020 at 6:00 PM ART, exactly one hour before the surprise release of Lali's fourth studio album, Libra.

== Music video ==
A music video directed by Lali herself was released on November 12, 2020, on Lali's YouTube channel. When asked to comment on the concept of the video, Lali said: "the idea of giving the video a black and white aesthetic was because it is not common in urban pop videos. I wanted us to play and pretend to be divas; for me, Cazzu is a diva in what she does, and I love pretending to be a diva in what I do. [I wanted to] challenge the idea of what is considered to be feminine and what being feminine truly is".

Lali and Cazzu shot their scenes in different countries. Lali shot her part in Madrid on October 10, 2020, the day of her 29th birthday. Meanwhile, Cazzu's part was shot in Buenos Aires. Lali directed Cazzu through a Zoom video conference from the set of Sky Rojo in Madrid at 3 AM CET during a night shooting.

== Charts ==
Chart (2020)	Peak position
Argentina (Argentina Hot 100)	37
Argentina Airplay (Monitor Latino)	12
Argentina Latin Airplay (Monitor Latino)	8
Argentina National Songs (Monitor Latino)	1

== See also ==
- List of airplay number-one hits in Argentina
