= Fascinada =

2020 single by Lali

Single by Lali

from the album Libra
- Released: August 5, 2020
- Recorded: 2019
- Genre: Latin pop; urban pop; dancehall; EDM
- Length: 2:44
- Label: Sony Argentina
- Songwriters: Mariana Espósito; Rafael Arcaute; Angel López; Federico Vindver; Gabriel González; Gino Borri
- Producers: Rafael Arcaute; Angel López; Federico Vindver

Lali singles chronology
"Las Maravillas de la Vida" (2020)	"Fascinada" (2020)	"Soy de Volar" (2020)

Music video
- "Fascinada" on YouTube

"Fascinada" (English: "Fascinated") is a song recorded by Argentine singer Lali, as the third track on her fourth studio album, Libra (2020). It was written by Lali, Rec808, Gino The Ghost, and its producers Rafael Arcaute, Angel López and Federico Vindver. On August 5, 2020, the song was released by Sony Music Argentina as the fourth single from the album.

== Background and composition ==
In "Fascinada", Lali achieves a "soft" pop with elements of urban and dancehall. Lyrically, the song narrates the story that is completely smitten with someone. Lali defined the song as "a love encounter that changes us, transforms us, and makes us feel alive; that first meeting with some who may become someone special in our lives, and who may take us higher in every way". Musically, Lali said: "we aimed at creating a different atmosphere, selecting other types of sounds for the music and playing with the song's structure. In order to transmit the sense of intimacy, we placed my voice in a sensual, almost-whisper way".

Florencia Mauro of Billboard Argentina praised the song for its "renovated and innovative sound"., while Jessica Roiz of Billboard highlighted the song's "hypnotic beat of mild urban melodies and sensual EDM rhythms".

== Music video ==
=== Production and release ===
A music video directed by Fernando Rochese and produced by Ghost Kid Films was released on August 5, 2020 on Lali's YouTube channel. The clip was recorded in Madrid, where Lali is settled to shoot Sky Rojo. The video premiered at 5 pm ART.

=== Synopsis ===
The music video shows a tropical and psychedelic aesthetic, with changing and surreal elements that enhance the romantic story within the song. In the clip, Lali delivers all her talent, including intricate choreography and extravagant costumes.

== Charts ==
=== Weekly charts ===
Chart (2020)	Peak position
Argentina Hot 100 (Billboard)	73
Argentina Airplay (Monitor Latino)	7
Argentina Latin Airplay (Monitor Latino)	6
Argentina National Songs (Monitor Latino)	2
Paraguay (SGP)	90
Paraguay Pop (Monitor Latino)	15
Uruguay (Monitor Latino)	9

=== Year-end charts ===
Chart (2020)	Position
Argentina Latin Airplay (Monitor Latino)	95
Paraguay Pop (Monitor Latino)	85
