= Lo Que Tengo Yo =

2020 single by Lali

Single by Lali

from the album Libra
- Released: May 22, 2020
- Recorded: 2020
- Genre: Latin pop; dance; electro-urban
- Length: 2:25
- Label: Sony Argentina
- Songwriters: Camilo Echeverry; Marco Masis; Mau Montaner; Ricky Montaner; Max Matluck
- Producer: Tainy

Lali singles chronology
"Color Esperanza" (2020)	"Lo Que Tengo Yo" (2020)	"Las Maravillas de la Vida" (2020)

Music video
- "Lo Que Tengo Yo" on YouTube

"Lo Que Tengo Yo" (English: "What I Have") is a song by Argentine singer Lali, released as the third single from her fourth studio album, Libra (2020). The song was released on May 22, 2020. It was written by Camilo, Mau y Ricky, and Matluck, along with its producer, Tainy.

== Background and composition ==
During an Instagram Live in late April 2020, Lali teased the first seconds of the song. She also said that, originally, the song was not going to be released and that it had not made it into the final selection of songs for her fourth studio album. However, one morning during the coronavirus quarantine, she found herself humming the demo of the song, which brought joy to her morning. It was for this reason that she decided to release the song and cheer up people's lives during lockdown. On a press release, Lali said that the song "was born from the desire to share music to have fun and move around at home, in this strange situation for everyone."

The song has "hypnotic dance beats fused with electro-urban rhythms", and its "flirtatious" lyrics are about "a girl who has got it going on and is a heartbreaker. According to Lali, the song is the "reaffirmation that we are all special together and apart". She added: "I feel free when I sing this song and I want to share that feeling with everyone".

== Music video ==
The "colorful and playful" music video was directed by Guido Adler and Lautaro Espósito, and executive-produced by Lali. The clip was described as "both impactful and a celebration of diversity in all its forms". It features Lali's friends and dancers from Argentina, Brazil, Israel, and other places around the world showcasing their talent dancing and having fun from their homes, proving that during these times, dancing is a good option to stay cheerful and motivated. There are people of all backgrounds, skin color, body types, levels of ability, different genders, and sexual orientations, and everyone is being celebrated and encouraged.

== Charts ==
=== Weekly charts ===
Chart (2020)	Peak position
Argentina (Argentina Hot 100)	28
Argentina Airplay (Monitor Latino)	2
Argentina Latin Airplay (Monitor Latino)	2
Argentina National Songs (Monitor Latino)	1
Uruguay Latin (Monitor Latino)	16

=== Year-end charts ===
Chart (2020)	Position
Argentina Airplay (Monitor Latino)	49
Argentina Latin Airplay (Monitor Latino)	36
Dominican Republic Pop (Monitor Latino)	60

== See also ==
- List of airplay number-one hits in Argentina
