= Laligera =

2019 single by Lali

Single by Lali

from the album Libra
- Released: October 10, 2019
- Recorded: 2019
- Genre: Pop; trap
- Length: 2:58
- Label: Sony Argentina
- Songwriters: Mariana Espósito; Rafael Arcaute; Rec808; Gino the Ghost; Federico Vindver; Ángel López
- Producers: Rafael Arcaute; Federico Vindver; Ángel López

Lali singles chronology
| "Somos Amantes" (2019) | "Laligera" (2019) | "Como Así" (2019) |

Music video
- "LALIGERA" on YouTube

"Laligera" (stylized in all upper case; English: "The Light One") is a song by Argentine singer Lali, released as the lead single from her fourth studio album, Libra (2020). The song was released on October 10, 2019, on Lali's 28th birthday. The track was written by Lali, Rec808 and Gino the Ghost, along with its producers Rafael Arcaute, Federico Vindver and Ángel López.

In 2020, "Laligera" helped Rafael Arcaute, one of the song's producers, receive a Latin Grammy nomination for Producer of the Year.

== Background and composition ==
"Laligera" is an infectious trap-pop song, which Lali defines as "heavier and stronger than any music [she has] done before". The empowering lyrics are about a girl who's independent and has the world in her hands. According to Lali, the song reflects a bit of where she comes from and where I grew up: a barrio in the south of Buenos Aires. In an interview with Remezcla, Lali said: "I grew up in a world with hard-working parents. We didn’t have a lot of money, but I had my dream".

== Music video ==
The music video was filmed by Orco in the porteño neighborhood of Parque Patricios, where Lali was born. It shows her skating in a basketball court and hanging out with a group of dancers. Artistic roller skating was the discipline Lali practised as a little girl, which allowed her to show her talent to an audience for the very first time. The clip also features cameos by Gimena Accardi and Candela Vetrano.

=== Laligera: Desde Cero ===
On October 25, 2019, Lali released a six-minute documentary with exclusive behind-the-scenes footage of the music video. The documentary, which was described as "a trip to Lali's childhood and beginnings", shows the singer's life beyond her artistic life. In Lali's words, "I wanted to go deeper into my roots, I didn't want it to be just a videoclip. It was important for me to make it from my most personal (and artistic) side".

== Critical reception ==
Jessica Roiz of Billboard said that the song "further spotlights Lali's musical growth". E! Online's Billy Nilles praised the single by saying that "[it] finds Lali letting everyone know there's no stopping her over a slick beat".

== Live performances ==
On November 17, 2019, Lali performed "Laligera" for the first time on television at the Susana Giménez talk show. The singer was also expected to perform her single "Como Así" with CNCO that night, though it was impossible as one of the boy band's members was not able to enter the country.

== Charts ==
| Chart (2019) | Peak position |
|---|---|
| Argentina (Argentina Hot 100) | 24 |
| Argentina Airplay (Monitor Latino) | 4 |
| Argentina Latin Airplay (Monitor Latino) | 3 |
| Argentina National Songs (Monitor Latino) | 1 |

== See also ==
- List of airplay number-one hits in Argentina
