= Esperanza mía (soundtrack) =

Soundtrack album by Lali Espósito
- Released: May 21, 2015
- Recorded: 2015
- Genre: Pop; gospel; ballad
- Length: 31:45
- Label: Sony Music Entertainment

Singles from Esperanza mía
- 1. "Tengo Esperanza" Released: April 6, 2015

Esperanza mía is the official soundtrack of the eponymous 2015 Argentine telenovela. The soundtrack was released through Sony Music Entertainment on May 21, 2015. The album debuted and peaked at No. 1 in Argentina and Uruguay and received a platinum certification by Cámara Argentina de Productores de Fonogramas y Videogramas (CAPIF) for selling 40,000 copies. Lali Espósito provides vocals to the entire album except "Lo Juro Por Dios", performed by Mexican singer Carlos Rivera and "Hacia Adelante", performed by Argentine actress Ángela Torres. Many tracks on the album were written by famous singers-songwriters as Paul Schwartz, Luciano Pereyra, Alejandro Sergi from Miranda!, Florencia Bertotti and Eduardo Frigerio.

== Release and promotion ==
Prior to the soundtrack's release, the program was presented with a show in La Plata on March 25, 2015, in which there were performed some tracks of the album. On May 12, 2015, Espósito performed "Tengo Esperanza" at the tenth edition premiere of "Bailando por un Sueño". Later that year, Espósito performed the same song at the season finale of the program, along with "Cómo Haremos". Espósito performed the third track of the album, "Júrame", across the third and fourth leg of her A Bailar Tour. The cast performed the soundtrack on their residency show, Esperanza Mía: el musical, in Buenos Aires, Córdoba and Rosario.

== Awards ==
The album was nominated for "Best Soundtrack Album" at the 2016 Gardel Awards.

| Year | Awards Ceremony | Award | Results |
|---|---|---|---|
| 2016 | Gardel Awards | Best Soundtrack Album | Nominated |

== Promotional single ==
"Tengo Esperanza", the theme song of the series, was sent to radio on April 6, 2015 as a promotional single off the album. The song won a Martín Fierro Award for Best Theme Song and received a nomination for the same category at the 2015 Tato Awards and another nomination for Favorite Song at the 2015 Nickelodeon Argentina Kids' Choice Awards, in which lost against another Lali Espósito song, "Mil Años Luz".

| Year | Awards Ceremony | Award | Results |
|---|---|---|---|
| 2015 | Nickelodeon Argentina Kids' Choice Awards | Favorite Song | Nominated |
| 2015 | Tato Awards | Best Theme Song | Nominated |
| 2016 | Martín Fierro Awards | Best Theme Song | Won |

== Track listing ==
Standard version
| No. | Title | Writer(s) | Performer(s) | Length |
|---|---|---|---|---|
| 1. | "Tengo Esperanza" | Mariana Espósito; Peter Akselrad; Paul Schwartz; Luis Burgio; Gustavo Novello | Lali | 3:12 |
| 2. | "Cómo Haremos" | Luciano Pereyra; José Luis Micucci; Schwartz | Lali | 3:01 |
| 3. | "Júrame" | Mariana Espósito; Peter Akselrad; Luis Burgio; Gustavo Novello; Schwartz | Lali | 3:01 |
| 4. | "Gloria" | Schwartz; Fernando López; Fedeico Montero | Lali | 2:42 |
| 5. | "El Ritmo del Momento" | Alejandro Sergi | Lali | 3:29 |
| 6. | "Necesito" | Schwartz; López; Montero | Lali | 2:59 |
| 7. | "Hacia Adelante" | Frigerio; Shwartz; San Millán; Ciarlo | Ángela Torres | 3:24 |
| 8. | "Lo Juro por Dios" | Schwartz; San Millán; Frigerio | Carlos Rivera | 4:04 |
| 9. | "Siempre Brilla el Sol" | Schwartz; López; Montero | Lali | 2:16 |
| 10. | "Me Muero por Vos" | Schwartz; Florencia Bertotti; Guillermo Lorenzo Fernández | Lali | 2:56 |
| 11. | "Esperanza Mía" | Espósito; Akselrad; Burgio; Novello; Schwartz | Lali | 3:42 |

Note

- Songwriting credits extracted from SADAIC official website.

== Chart performance ==
| Chart | Peak position |
|---|---|
| Argentine Albums (CAPIF) | 1 |
| Uruguayan Albums (CUD) | 1 |

== Certifications ==
| Region | Certification | Certified units/sales |
|---|---|---|
| Argentina (CAPIF) | Platinum | 40,000^{^} |
^{^} Shipments figures based on certification alone.

== Release history ==
List of release dates, formats, label and reference
| Region | Date | Format | Label | Ref. |
|---|---|---|---|---|
| Argentina | May 19, 2015 | CD | Sony Music Entertainment | |
| Worldwide | May 21, 2015 | Digital download | Sony Music Entertainment | |
| Uruguay | July 7, 2015 | CD | Sony Music Entertainment | — |
