= Libra (Lali album) =

Studio album by Lali
- Released: 12 November 2020
- Recorded: 2019–2020
- Studio: Los Angeles, California, US; Miami, Florida, US; Madrid, Spain; Buenos Aires, Argentina
- Genre: Latin pop; trap; urban pop
- Length: 33:19
- Label: Sony Argentina
- Producer: Rafael Arcaute; Tainy; Julio Reyes Copello; Abraham Mateo; Nicolás De La Espirella; Big One; Ángel Lopez; Federico Vindver; Rec808; JonTheProducer; Brasa; Jowan; Rolo; Diego Olivero

Lali chronology
Brava (2018)	Libra (2020)	Lali (2023)

Singles from Libra
- 1. "Laligera" Released: 10 October 2019; 2. "Como Así" Released: 8 November 2019; 3. "Lo Que Tengo Yo" Released: 22 May 2020; 4. "Fascinada" Released: 5 August 2020; 5. "Ladrón" Released: 12 November 2020

Libra is the fourth studio album by Argentine singer Lali, released on 12 November 2020 by Sony Music Argentina. The singer worked with a variety of producers and co-writers on the album, including Rafael Arcaute, Tainy, Fito Páez, Camilo, Mau y Ricky, Julio Reyes Copello, Abraham Mateo, Big One, Rec808, and JonTheProducer, among others.

The album expands on the pop sound of its predecessors, A Bailar (2014), Soy (2016) and Brava (2018), while incorporating elements of hip-hop, trap, R&B, reggaeton, and urban pop. Precisely, Libra finds Lali looking for a balance between her signature pop sound, which she defines as her "essence", and these new urban elements that she had been incorporating into her music since Brava. Cazzu, Mau y Ricky, Noriel and CNCO make guest appearances in the album.

Libra was preceded by the release of four singles between October 2019 and August 2020: "Laligera", "Como Así", "Lo Que Tengo Yo" and "Fascinada". The album was released on the evening of 12 November 2020 as a surprise release, exactly an hour after the Cazzu-assisted track, "Ladrón", was released as its fifth single. The record debuted at number three on the Argentine Albums chart, and it climbed to the number-one position the following week. It went on to spend seven consecutive weeks on the chart's top ten.

== Background and recording ==
In August 2018, Lali released her third studio album Brava. Work on Libra commenced six months later, as the earliest record of Lali working on it suggests, in February 2019. In early 2019, the singer traveled to the United States to promote her collaboration with Thalía, titled "Lindo Pero Bruto", which both singers had recently released as a single. During that trip, Lali got in a studio with Mau y Ricky and Camilo to work on what eventually became the album's sixth track, "No Puedo Olvidarte". In March, Lali posted a series of photos to Instagram with the caption "Studio Time" from Miami. Work on the studio continued in April as Lali posted a photo from a studio with DJ Snake. In May, it was announced that Lali was going to host the 2019 Premios Juventud alongside CNCO and Alejandra Espinoza. For that reason, she traveled to Miami to announce the nominees, and she stayed for a couple of weeks to work on new music with Rafael Arcaute, Julio Reyes Copello and other producers and songwriters.

In June, Lali confirmed that work on her fourth studio album had effectively begun via Twitter: "After many years in the music industry, on the way to my fourth studio album, questioning and challenging myself is necessary. [I am] in a different place as a woman and as an artist! [I am] going out of my confort zone[,] focusing on what is truly important for me" In July, the singer once again traveled to the United States to co-host the 2019 Premios Juventud, and, again, stayed to work on new music. By that time, Lali admitted that Miami had become the "operations center" for the creation of her fourth studio album. On October and November, Lali released "Laligera" and "Como Así", respectively, as the first singles off Libra.

On 7 November, Lali finished the last leg of her Brava Tour, in which she visited multiple U.S. cities and culminated in Washington, D.C. Exactly one week later, it was announced that Lali was going to be part of the main cast of a new Netflix series, titled Sky Rojo. In late November, Lali moved to Spain and settled in Madrid to shoot the series. The shooting of the series delayed the release of Lali's new music. Although the shooting of Sky Rojo was originally planned to take place in approximately four months, the production of the series was forced to stop and was postponed due to the COVID-19 pandemic starting from March 2020. The pandemic caused the series to stop and, therefore, Lali's music to be further delayed. Before a nationwide lockdown was established in Argentina, Lali managed to return to the country and go through quarantine in her Buenos Aires house. The singer took advantage of the time she spent in lockdown to focus on her new music. In May, Lali released "Lo Que Tengo Yo" as the album's third single. She recorded and released the song during lockdown, although her original plan was to dismiss it from the album's tracklist. By the end of May, although the nationwide lockdown in Argentina was still running, Lali was legally allowed to return to Spain to keep shooting Sky Rojo. In November 2020, Lali confessed that, like many of the Sky Rojo staff, she tested positive for COVID-19 between the months of June and November.

Libra was recorded in different studios of Miami, Los Angeles, Madrid and Buenos Aires. The album is Lali's first work in which the production company 3musica was not involved, unlike her three previous musical efforts which were fully produced by the 3musica team. For Libra, Lali decided to work with different producers for every song: "I decided to get into the studio everyday with a different producer, a different songwriter, with people that had different ideas from the composer of the day before, willing to make songs that are not similar to the music I made the days before".

In early November, Lali announced the highly anticipated collaboration with Cazzu, "Ladrón". The song was released on 12 November 2020, at 6:00 PM ART. Half an hour later, Lali went live on Instagram and videocalled the artists that would be later revealed as featured artists of the album. Finally, at 7:00 PM, Lali surprisingly announced that the entire album was then available on all streaming platforms.

== Title ==
The title of the album makes reference to Libra, the seventh astrological sign in the Zodiac. According to western astrology, Libras are born between 23 September and 22 October. Lali was born on 10 October 1991, thus having been born a Libra herself. According to the Zodiac, of which Lali has recurrently shown to be a strong believer, Libra is "represented by the wighing scales, an association that reflects Libra's fixation on balance and harmony. Libra is obsessed with symmetry and strives to create equilibrium in all areas of life". Lali's zodiac sign was, then, the inspiration behind the name of her fourth studio album. In Libra, Lali seeks a balance between all her aspects as an artist, blending multiple vocal ranges and music genres within the pop genre. Lali confirmed the meaning behind the title of the album, saying:

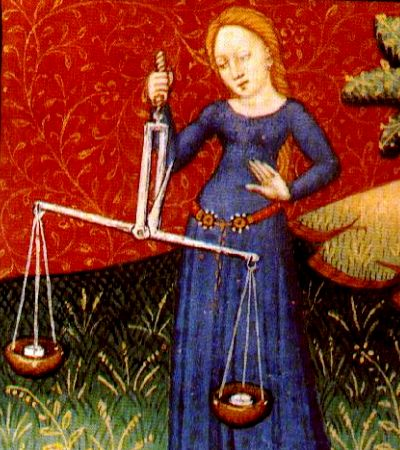
The title of the album makes reference to the Zodiac sign of Libra.

The title, besides making reference to my [zodiac] sign, is related to the notion of equilibrium, which I had recurrently in mind while making [the album]. Facing a fourth studio album is not easy; you don't want to repeat yourself with what you have done before, but, at the same time, you don't want to make something that is not "you", that is not genuine and true to yourself. The last two years, I have been working on these songs, on the search of the balance between the blending of urban pop sounds that I had never done before.

Lali added:

[The title of the album] is related to the fact that there were two years of working on songs in which I seeked, precisely, that equilibrium. Comparisons are usually unpleasant for me. It is strange to compare and to compare oneself with a good moment that you had and to want to replicate it. Not only it is stupid but also it isn't real. So you must work hard not to repeat yourself. It is not about comparing [yourself] with hat you have done; it is about going towards what you consider to be evolution, and all these thoughts gave meaning to my fourth album: accepting that I make a type of music that is urban pop, but still trying to make it sound personal, that when you listen to an album track you feel it like "Lali".

== Composition ==
=== Music and lyrics ===
Musically, Libra is an urban pop record that includes elements of trap and hip-hop on its beats and production. The melodies and harmonies on the album are diverse and include mostly uptempo songs and many other downtempo, sentimental ballads. It explores a diversity of other music genres, including reggaeton, R&B, dancehall, dance, electronic music, and minimal gospel influences. Jessica Roiz of Billboard stated that Libra showcases Lali's "musical growth and versatility as an artist, from sensual trap to infectious pop fusions".

=== Songs ===
The album begins with the trap-pop song "Eclipse". Lali stated that the opening track "is a very 'Lali' song in every way and that is why the album kicks off with [it], because it's strong and it lets you in on the sound that's found in Libra." The song was recorded in Miami with the same team with which Lali worked on "Laligera" and "Fascinada", including the album's general producer, Rafael Arcaute. For "Eclipse", Lali worked with Julio Reyes Copello, who, according to Lali, "is a composer that has worked with Alejandro Sanz and Shakira, but who also can create these hip-hop universes and trap beats that are new to [her]". Lali added that, for her, the track is "super pop in its vocal arrangement, melody, chorus, and verses. [There is] a very femenine intention with more violent trap beats than what [she] is used to do. That fusion defines what happens in the rest of the record". For the second track, "Ladrón", Lali worked with Argentine rapper Cazzu. Lali and Cazzu are often referred to as the maximum exponents of pop and trap, respectively, in Argentina's music scene, what created high expectations and anticipation for the song. The track was created by all Argentines: it was co-written by Lali and Cazzu themselves, alongside rapper FMK and the song's producer, Big One. Lali expressed that "Ladron" is "the perfect fusion of pop and urban that defines the album". In the album's third track, "Fascinada", Lali achieves a "soft" pop with elements of urban and dancehall. Lyrically, Lali defines the song as "a love encounter that changes us, transforms us, and makes us feel alive; that first meeting with somebody who may become someone special in our lives, and who may take us higher in every way". Florencia Mauro of Billboard Argentina praised the song for its "renovated and innovative sound".

The album's fourth track is the uptempo "Bailo Pa Mi". Lyrically, Lali stated: "It's a song that talks about something that I believe a lot in, which is individual strength, and it places you in a very cool place of empowerment because it's about making yourself pretty for yourself and dancing for [yourself]". The song was co-written and produced by Spanish singer Abraham Mateo, who previously worked with Lali in "Mueve" (2016) and "Salvaje" (2018). For the album's fifth track, "Enredaos", Lali worked with Elena Rose, Claudia Prieto, and Rec808. The song, which has been described as a "modern ballad", was first teased by Lali in July 2019. The album's sixth track, "No Puedo Olvidarte", is a collaboration with Venezuelan-American duo Mau y Ricky. Lali and the duo had previously collaborated on the 2018 smash-hits "Mi Mala (Remix)" and "Sin Querer Queriendo". The song was co-written by Lali, Mau y Ricky, Camilo, Elof Loelv, and its producer, Jon Leone. The earliest record of Lali working on Libra dates of February 2019, and it finds her in a studio with Mau, Ricky and Camilo with the beat of the song playing on the background.

The seventh track of Libra is "Laligera". The title of the song is a pun that plays with Lali's name and the Spanish-language adjective "ligera", which means "light" or "quick". The pun has been interpreted as both being quick in achieving records and going beyond the place in which one is born, but it is also an attempt by Lali of naturalizing promiscuity in women. "Laligera" has been described as "an infectious trap-pop song", and its "empowering" lyrics are about a girl who is independent and has the world in her hands. According to Lali, the song reflects a bit of where she comes from and where she grew up: a barrio in south Buenos Aires, and in a family that, according to Lali, "didn't have a lot of money". "Lo Que Tengo Yo", the album's eight track, is the only song of Libra that was not co-written by Lali. It was written by Mau y Ricky, Camilo, Max Matluck, and its producer, Tainy. The song presents dance beats fused with electro-urban rhythms. Lyrically, the song is about "a girl who has got it going on and [who] is a heartbreaker".

"Pa Que Me Quieras", the album's ninth track is a collaboration with Puerto Rican rapper Noriel. The song was recorded in July 2019 and it was teased by both artists the following months. The track was originally planned to be released in January 2020 as the third single off Libra, but it was postponed by the shooting of Sky Rojo and the COVID-19 pandemic. After much anticipation, "Pa Que Me Quieras" was ultimately released as part of Libra in November 2020. "Como Así" is the album's tenth track, and it features guest vocals by CNCO. The song kicks off with romantic guitar riffs before dropping a catchy pop-dembow melody. Lyrically, the song is "a heartfelt track about a couple who, despite calling it quits, can't fathom the fact that they have broken up and are unable to move on". Libra closes with the gospel-infected ballad "Una Esquina en Madrid". The title means "a street corner in Madrid" because Lali wrote it one night on a balcony of her Madrid apartment, which is located in a street corner. The music of the song was composed by Argentine singer Fito Paez. According to Lali, after writing the lyrics, she sent them to Paez, who sent her a video of him finding the melody in a piano. Paez and Lali worked together earlier that year when Lali guest-appeared on Paez's song "Gente en la Calle". Lali talked about the lyrics of the song with Billboard, and said: "the lyrics have a lot of truth to it and it's what I'm living at the moment. It's who Lali is today and it places me in a place of adulthood and my search. It closes my album because it's a song of gratitude to life, of understanding life and of who I am now; of an important reaffirmation of this moment".

== Singles ==
Lali kicked off the Libra era with the release of "Laligera". The song was released on 10 October 2019, on Lali's 28th birthday, along with a music video. The music video was filmed by Orco in the porteño neighborhood of Parque Patricios, where Lali was born. It shows her skating in a basketball court and hanging out with a group of dancers. Artistic roller skating was the discipline Lali practised as a little girl, which allowed her to show her talent to an audience for the very first time. The song debuted at number 42 on the Billboard Argentina Hot 100 and charted for seven weeks. Having peaked at number 24, "Laligera" became Lali's highest-charting solo song since the chart launched in October 2018. In 2020, "Laligera" was listed among the works for which Rafael Arcaute was nominated as Producer of the Year for the 21st Annual Latin Grammy Awards.

"Como Así" was released as the album's second single on 8 November 2019. The song features guest vocals from boy-band CNCO. The music video for the single was filmed in Mexico City and directed by Joaquín Cambre. In the clip, Lali portrays the love interest for each of the CNCO members, with each scene telling a different story. "Como Así" charted in multiple Latin American countries, including Chile, the Dominican Republic, Ecuador, Panama, Paraguay, Peru, Uruguay, and Argentina, where it peaked at number 33 and charted for 22 weeks. The single also became Lali's longest-running number-one single on Monitor Latino's Argentine National Songs chart. In 2020, the song received a Gardel Award nomination as Collaboration of the Year, although it lost to Eruca Sativa and Abel Pintos's "Amor Ausente".

In May 2020, Lali released the album's third single, "Lo Que Tengo Yo". The singer admitted that, originally, the song was not going to be released and that it had not made it into the final selection of songs for Libra. However, one morning during the COVID-19 lockdowns, she found herself humming the demo of the song, which brought joy to her morning. It was for this reason that she decided to release the song and cheer up people's lives during lockdown. The song charted for 18 weeks on the Billboard Argentina Hot 100, where it peaked at number 28, and it also reached the number-two position on Monitor Latino's Argentina Airplay chart – her highest-peaking single to date. The single also became Lali's third solo number-one single – fourth overall – on the Argentina National Songs chart, extending her record as the Argentine female singer with the most solo number-one songs.

In August 2020, Lali released "Fascinada" as the album's fourth single, with a music video filmed from Madrid. The song peaked at number 73 on the Billboard Argentina Hot 100 chart.

In November 2020, the singer released her highly anticipated collaboration with Cazzu, "Ladrón". The black and white music video was directed by Lali herself and filmed in Madrid and Buenos Aires. The song debuted at number 84 on the Billboard Argentina Hot 100 counting just six tracking hours since its release until the chart's tracking week ended.
The track eventually reached a new peak of 37 on the chart.

== Track listing ==
Libra track listing
No.	Title	Writer(s)	Producer(s)	Length
1.	"Eclipse"	Mariana Espósito; Rafael Arcaute; Julio Reyes Copello; Nicolás De La Espirella; Leroy Sanchez	Rafael Arcaute; Julio Reyes Copello; Nicolás De La Espirella	3:03
2.	"Ladrón" (with Cazzu)	Espósito; Julieta Cazzuchelli; Daniel Real; Enzo Sauthier	Big One	3:19
3.	"Fascinada"	Espósito; Arcaute; Angel López; Federico Vindver; Gabriel Gonzalez; Gino Borri	Arcaute; Ángel Lopez; Federico Vindver	2:44
4.	"Bailo Pa Mí"	Espósito; Abraham Mateo Chamorro; Edgar Andino	Abraham Mateo	2:39
5.	"Enredaos"	Espósito; Gabriel Gonzalez; Claudia Prieto; Elena Rose	Rec808	3:12
6.	"No Puedo Olvidarte" (with Mau y Ricky)	Espósito; Mauricio Montaner; Ricardo Montaner; Jon Leone; Camilo Echeverry; Elof Loelv	JonTheProducer	2:45
7.	"Laligera"	Espósito; Arcaute; Angel López; Federico Vindver; Gabriel Gonzalez; Gino Borri	Arcaute; Lopez; Vindver	2:58
8.	"Lo Que Tengo Yo"	Marco Masis; M. Montaner; R. Montaner; Echeverry; Max Matluck	Tainy	2:26
9.	"Pa Que Me Quieras" (with Noriel)	Espósito; Noel Santos Román; Juan Manuel Frías; José Robles; Juan Rubiera; Juan Santana; Ronny Frías	Brasa	3:11
10.	"Como Así" (featuring CNCO)	Espósito; Jowan Espinosa; J. Frías; Andrés Restrepo; Pablo Preciado; Yoel Henriquez	Jowan; Rolo	3:06
11.	"Una Esquina en Madrid"	Espósito; Fito Páez	Diego Olivero	3:49
Total length:				33:19

== Personnel ==
Credits adapted from Tidal.

=== Musicians ===
- Lali – vocals (tracks 1–11)
- Cazzu – vocals (track 2)
- Mau y Ricky – vocals (track 6)
- Noriel – songwriting (track 9)
- CNCO – songwriting (track 10)
- Abraham Mateo – background vocals (track 11)
- Fito Paez – background vocals (track 11)
- Julio Reyes Copello – keyboards (track 1)
- Nicolás De La Espirella – keyboards (track 1)
- Angel Lopez – keyboards (track 7)
- Federico Vindver – keyboards (track 7)
- Rafael Arcaute – keyboards (track 7)
- Pablo Preciado – guitar (track 10)
- Matías Sorokin – acoustic guitar (track 11)
- Diego Olivero – bass, electric guitar, keyboards (track 11)
- Carlos Vandera – choir vocals (track 11)
- Juan Absatz – choir vocals, choir master, clapping (track 11)
- Leticia Chappa – choir vocals, clapping (track 11)
- Marisa Mere – choir vocals, clapping (track 11)
- Inés Rampoldi – clapping (track 11)
- Marcelo Novati – drums (track 11)

=== Production ===
- Rafael Arcaute – production (tracks 1, 3, 7)
- Julio Reyes Copello – production (track 1)
- Nicolás De La Espirella – production (track 1)
- Big One – production (track 2)
- Angel Lopez – production (tracks 3, 7)
- Federico Vindver – production (tracks 3, 7)
- Abraham Mateo – production (track 4)
- Rec808 – production (track 5)
- Jon Leone – production (track 6)
- Tainy – production (track 8)
- Brasa – production (track 9)
- Rolo – production (track 10)
- Jowan – production (track 10)
- Diego Olivero – songwriting (track 11)

=== Songwriting ===
- Mariana Espósito – songwriting (tracks 1–7, 9–11)
- Julio Reyes Copello – songwriting (track 1)
- Leroy Sanchez – songwriting (track 1)
- Nicolás De La Espirella – songwriting (track 1)
- Rafael Arcaute – songwriting (tracks 1, 3, 6–7)
- Julieta Cazzuchelli – songwriting (track 2)
- Daniel Real – songwriting (track 2)
- Enzo Sauthier – songwriting (track 2)
- Angel Lopez – songwriting (tracks 3, 7)
- Federico Vindver – songwriting (tracks 3, 7)
- Gabriel Gonzalez – songwriting (tracks 3, 5, 7)
- Gino Borri – songwriting (track 3, 7)
- Abraham Mateo – songwriting (track 4)
- Edgar Andino – songwriting (track 4)
- Elena Rose – songwriting (track 5)
- Claudia Prieto – songwriting (track 5)
- Camilo Echeverry – songwriting (tracks 6, 8)
- Elof Loelv – songwriting (track 6)
- Jon Leone – songwriting (track 6)
- Mauricio Montaner – songwriting (tracks 6, 8)
- Ricardo Montaner – songwriting (tracks 6, 8)
- Marco Masís – songwriting (track 8)
- Max Matluck – songwriting (track 8)
- José Robles – songwriting (track 9)
- Juan Frías – songwriting (track 9–10)
- Juan Santana – songwriting (track 9)
- Juan Rubiera – songwriting (track 9)
- Noel Santos – songwriting (track 9)
- Ronny Frías – songwriting (track 9)
- Andrés Restrepo – songwriting (track 10)
- Johan Espinosa – songwriting (track 10)
- Pablo Preciado – songwriting (track 10)
- Yoel Henríquez – songwriting (track 10)
- Fito Páez – songwriting (track 11)

=== Technical ===
- Kevin Peterson – mastering (tracks 1–9, 11)
- Maddox Chhim – mixing (track 1, 3, 5–10)
- Julio Reyes Copello – performance arrangement, programming, recording engineering (track 1)
- Nicolás De La Espirella – performance arrangement, programming, recording engineering (track 1)
- Rafael Arcaute – performance arrangement, programming (track 1), recording engineering (tracks 1, 3, 7), A&R direction (tracks 1–11)
- Daniel Alanís – recording engineering (tracks 1–6, 9, 11)
- Big One – mixing (track 1)
- Angel Lopez – performance arrangement (track 3)
- Federico Vindver – performance arrangement (tracks 3, 7)
- Jon Leone – recording engineering (track 6)
- Nano Novello – recording engineering (tracks 7–8, 10)
- Julian Burgio – recording engineering (track 8)
- Rolo – performance arrangement, recording engineering (track 10)
- Jowan – programming (track 10)
- Jan Fonsi – recording engineering (track 10)
- Jean Rodríguez – recording engineering (track 10)
- Luis Burgio – recording engineering (track 10)
- Peter Akselrad – recording engineering (track 10)
- Max Milglin – mixing (track 11)
- Diego Olivero – performance arrangement, recording engineering (track 11)
- Juan Absatz – recording engineering (track 11)
- Marcelo Novati – recording engineering (track 11)
- Matías Sorokin – recording engineering (track 11)
- Pablo Durand – A&R direction (tracks 1–11)
- Federico Kalwill – A&R coordination (tracks 1–11)
- Oriana Hidalgo – A&R coordination (tracks 1–11)
- Javier Caso – A&R assistant (tracks 1–11)

=== Design ===
- Álvaro García – photography
- Beatriz Matallana – makeup, hair
- Minerva Portillo – styling
- Omar Souto – art design

== Charts ==
Chart performance for Libra
Chart (2020)	Peak position
Argentine Albums (CAPIF)	1

Chart performance for Libra
Chart (2023)	Peak position
Uruguayan Albums (CUD)	16

== Release history ==
Release history for Libra
Region	Date	Format(s)	Label	Ref.
Various	12 November 2020	Digital download; streaming	Sony Music Argentina	
Argentina	12 November 2020	CD	Sony Music Argentina	
Uruguay	16 December 2020	CD	Sony Music	
Spain	18 December 2020	CD	Sony Music	
