= Lali Espósito =

Argentine actress and singer (born 1991)

- Espósito in 2025
- Born: Mariana Espósito; 10 October 1991 (age 35); Buenos Aires, Argentina
- Occupations: Singer; actress; dancer; model
- Years active: 1998–present
- Works: Discography; songs; videography
- Spouse: Pedro Rosemblat (married 2026–present)
- Awards: Full list
- Musical career
- Genres: Latin pop; dance; Latin hip-hop; dubstep
- Label: Sony Argentina
- Member of: BOM
- Formerly of: Teen Angels
- Website: lalioficial.com

Mariana "Lali" Espósito (born 10 October 1991) is an Argentine singer, actress, dancer, and model. She began her career in 2003 in the children's telenovela Rincón de Luz. Espósito continued to build her acting and singing career with subsequent supporting roles in other telenovelas such as Floricienta and Chiquititas. Her role in Casi ángeles propelled her to fame, making her a household name in Latin America, the Middle East, and Europe. From 2007 to 2012, she was a part of the popular teen pop band Teen Angels, which originated from the television series Casi Ángeles. The group was commercially successful and toured throughout Argentina and countries such as Israel, Spain, Italy, and Latin America.

In 2014, she signed a record deal with Sony Music Argentina and released her debut solo studio album, A Bailar, which features pop and EDM influences. The album was a commercial success, spawning several hit singles including "Asesina", "Mil Años Luz" and "Histeria." Her second album Soy (2016) spawned the singles "Soy", "Boomerang" and "Ego". Both albums were certified gold in Argentina. Her third album, Brava (2018) includes hit singles like "Una Na", "Tu Novia" and "100 Grados". Her fourth studio album, Libra, was released in 2020 and includes the singles "Laligera", "Como Así" and "Lo Que Tengo Yo".

She received critical acclaim for her portrayal of Abigail Williams in the Buenos Aires production of The Crucible and for her roles in the crime-thriller film The Accused and Netflix's action crime drama television series Sky Rojo. Throughout her career, Espósito has received numerous awards and nominations, including six Gardel Awards, five MTV Europe Music Awards, thirteen Argentina Kids' Choice Awards, one Billboard Latin Music Award, and seven MTV Millennial Awards. She has also been nominated for the Lo Nuestro Awards and the Seoul International Drama Awards. In 2015, Infobae named her one of the ten most influential women in Argentina, a testament to her impact and influence in the entertainment industry.

== Life and career ==
=== 1991–2003: Early life and career: Rincón de Luz ===
Mariana Espósito was born on 10 October 1991 in Buenos Aires to Carlos Espósito, a football coach, and Maria José Riera, who road-manages her tours. She has two older siblings, Ana Laura, a makeup artist and stylist, and Patricio Espósito, a former futsal player who played in Italy. Espósito lived in the Buenos Aires neighbourhood of Parque Patricios during her childhood and then moved to the district of Banfield, Buenos Aires. Espósito is of Italian descent through some of her great-grandparents.

Espósito made her television debut at the age of 6 on the children's program Caramelito y Vos in 1998, as a contestant impersonating Uruguayan actress and singer Natalia Oreiro. After wandering into a producer Cris Morena audition by mistake in early 2002, Espósito was cast in Morena's children television series Rincón de Luz, making her acting debut as part of the children's supporting cast, portraying Malena "Coco" Cabrera. Rincón de Luz ran on Argentina's Canal 9 and later América TV from 18 February 2003 to 18 December 2003. Espósito also made her singing debut in the Rincón de Luz soundtrack album, singing a duet with Agustín Sierra. Due to Rincón de Luz's success in Israel, Espósito was part of a stage adaptation at the Yad Eliyahu Arena in Tel Aviv, which ran for two weeks in April 2004.

=== 2004–2006: Settlement as a child actress: Floricienta and Chiquititas ===
In 2004, Espósito was cast as Roberta in the juvenile telenovela Floricienta, also created and produced by Cris Morena, which ran for two seasons on El Trece from 15 March 2004 to 2 December 2005. Floricienta was a record-smashing success in Argentina, Latin America, Israel and Europe, and has been broadcast in over 70 countries since its original run. The series helped to establish Espósito as a child actress of the likes of former Cris Morena Group stars Agustina Cherri, Marcela Kloosterboer, Luisana Lopilato and Camila Bordonaba. Espósito was also part of the stage adaptation of Floricienta, albeit portraying different versions of her character, which ran for over 100 shows in 2004 and 2005 at Teatro Gran Rex, 10 shows at the Luna Park arena and 4 shows at the Vélez Sarfield Stadium, as well as a national tour in Argentina.

In 2006, Espósito led the children's cast in the remake of Cris Morena's highly successful children's series Chiquititas, released as Chiquititas Sin Fin, portraying Agustina Ross. Espósito also sang "Me Pasan Cosas" and "Por Una Sola Vez", two of the songs in the Chiquititas soundtrack album 24 Horas, which was one of the top ten selling albums in 2006 and participated in the stage adaptations in mid 2006 at Teatro Gran Rex.

=== 2007–2010: Success with Casi Ángeles and Teen Angels ===
In 2007, Espósito landed her first leading role on television, as Marianella "Mar" Rinaldi in Casi Ángeles (Almost Angels), also created by Morena and produced by Cris Morena Group. It became one of the most popular adolescent television programs in Argentina, Latin America and Israel. The series lasted from 2007 to 2010 and held high viewer ratings and earning four Martín Fierro Awards for Best Juvenile Program.

While acting in Casi Ángeles, Espósito became one of five members of successful pop band Teen Angels, signed to Sony BMG, along with Gastón Dalmau, Juan Pedro Lanzani, Nicolás Riera and María Eugenia Suárez. Teen Angels reached success in countries such as Argentina, Israel, Chile, Peru, Spain and Uruguay. Although Casi Ángeles ended in 2010, the band members announced they would continue working together, with Rochi Igarzábal replacing María Eugenia Suárez.

From 2007 to 2012, Teen Angels released six studio albums, of which five were certified platinum and one was certified gold by the Argentine Chamber of Phonograms and Videograms Producers. They were also spokespersons for numerous brands, such as Coca-Cola. The band won a Clarín Award, a Kids' Choice Award Argentina, two Los 40 Principales Awards, and a Quiero Award, and three nominations for Carlos Gardel Awards.

Teen Angels disbanded in 2012, and held its last concert on 11 October 2012 in Córdoba. Teen Angels, el adiós, a 3D concert film about Teen Angels, was released in 2013 and marked the end of the group.

=== 2011–2013: Cuando me sonreis, The Crucible, Solamente vos and "A Bailar" ===
After the end of Casi Ángeles, Espósito adopted her nickname Lali, by which she had been known to her friends and family, as her stage name.

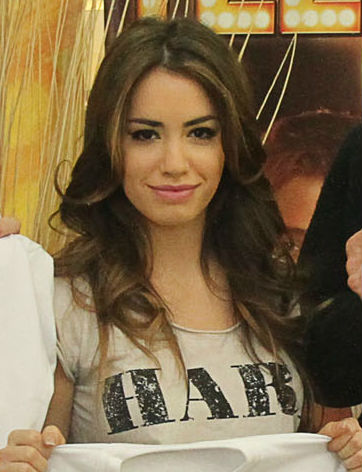
Espósito in 2012

In 2011, Espósito starred on Cuando me sonreís (When you smile at me), a new television series by Tomás Yankelevich, opposite Facundo Arana, Julieta Díaz and Benjamín Rojas. The following year, Espósito portrayed Abigail Williams in the Buenos Aires production of The Crucible by Arthur Miller, and made her film debut with La pelea de mi vida (The Fight of My Life), which also starred Mariano Martínez and Federico Amador.

Since January 2013, Espósito had starred in the Pol-ka series Solamente vos (Only You), along with Adrián Suar and Natalia Oreiro, as Daniela, one of its leading characters. In 2013, Espósito announced she would release her first album as a solo artist, titled A Bailar. When asked about the album's genre, she described it as mainly dance with hip hop influences. The album's lead single, "A Bailar", was released for digital download on her website on 5 August, causing the website to crash because of a spike in traffic. On 2 September, Espósito presented the music video for "A Bailar" at the prominent La Trastienda Club. "A Bailar" received 100,000 YouTube views on its release day, and the single entered the top 20 on iTunes Latin and iTunes Israel. It was also popular in music charts and radio channels in Latin America, Italy and Israel.

=== 2014–2015: A Bailar, A los 40 and Esperanza mía ===
Previous to the release of her debut album, Espósito released A Bailar EP, which included the tracks "A Bailar", "Asesina" and "Del Otro Lado". The music video for "Asesina", the second single, was uploaded to the singer's official YouTube account on 10 March 2014. The ten-track album A Bailar (English: Let's Dance) was released on 21 March 2014.

In support of the album, Espósito embarked on the A Bailar Tour of Argentina, with several later stops in Uruguay, Chile, Spain, Italy and Israel. The tour earned million in the first five shows at Teatro Opera Allianz and was later named the highest-grossing tour of 2015 in Argentina. Following the tour's success, more dates were added, and the tour concluded on 25 April 2016 at Menora Mivtachim Arena, Tel Aviv, after a total of 74 dates.

In May 2014 she starred in the Peruvian film "A los 40" (At 40), directed by Bruno Ascenzo. In the same year, she became the first ever Argentine artist to win a Kids' Choice Award in the United States for Best Latin Artist.

In late 2014, the singer signed an exclusive publishing contract with Sony Music Argentina and released "Mil Años Luz" as the third single from A Bailar. To celebrate her incorporation into Sony Music Argentina, Espósito released a deluxe edition of A Bailar, which included unpublished material, including a new song, a remix, several video clips, and a documentary of the tour. The album peaked at No. 3 in Uruguay and at No. 5 in Argentina, where it was certified gold a few days after its release.

In 2015, Espósito starred in the Pol-ka telenovela Esperanza mía (My lovely hope) alongside Mariano Martinez as Julia "Esperanza" Albarrazin, a young woman who settles in a convent by posing as a novice.

The A Bailar Tour, continued to 2016 across national cities like Buenos Aires, Rosario, Mar del Plata and Córdoba and included international stops in Uruguay, Italy, Spain and Israel. In 2014, the singer performed as the opening act for Ricky Martin show, held in Buenos Aires and in 2015 for Katy Perry's The Prismatic World Tour.

=== 2016–2017: Soy, That's Not Cheating and collaborations ===
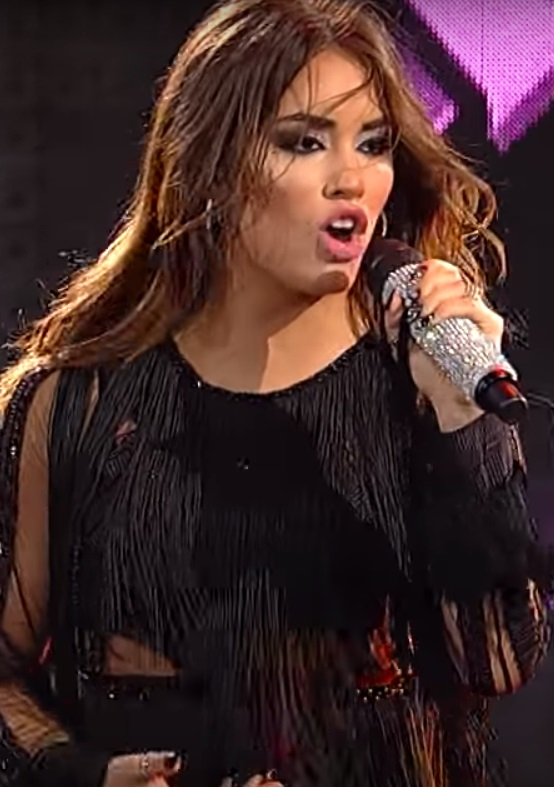
Espósito in the Viña del Mar International Song Festival in 2017.

Espósito released her second studio album Soy on 20 May 2016, with El País newspaper writing that "she takes one more step with this album, she experiments, shows herself as she is, and that is always valuable". In an interview with Intrusos, the singer referred to the album's title (Soy, English: I Am) saying that "it is called Soy because I am sharing the truth about what I think and feel. It is super personal". It sold more than 20,000 copies in Argentina in just three hours, being certified gold by the Argentine Chamber of Phonograms and Videograms Producers (CAPIF). The album debuted at No. 1 in Argentina, Uruguay and Israel, and at No. 5 and No. 6 in Italy and Spain, respectively. Its lead single, "Soy", was released on 5 May and peaked at No. 5 on the Monitor Latino Argentina Top 20 chart and at No. 15 on the Ecuador Pop Songs chart. The second single, "Boomerang", was released on 5 September 2016. As of June 2017, its music video has been viewed more than 17 million times. Soy was listed as one of the best albums of 2016 by Billboard Brasil along with Beyoncé's Lemonade, Lady Gaga's Joanne, J Balvin's Energía and others. In the same year, Espósito was featured on Abraham Mateo's remix of the song "Mueve" from the re-issue of his album Are You Ready?, on Brian Cross song "Firestarter" from his second studio album Darkness to Life and on Baby K's Spanish version of the international hit "Roma-Bangkok".

In August, Espósito starred in the romantic comedy film That's Not Cheating (Permitidos) as Camila Boecchi alongside Martín Piroyansky. The film, which was directed by Ariel Winograd, grossed US$1.9 million and has been viewed more than 370,000 times. The review aggregator website Todas Las Críticas assigned the film a weighted average score of 67 out of 100, based on 42 critics, indicating "generally favorable reviews".

The singer embarked on the Soy Tour of Latin America, Europe and Asia on 8 September. Reviews of the tour performances generally praised Espósito's vocals and the show's staging, which is said that "fulfills the expectations of a nowadays international pop show."

Espósito's 2016 most notable accolades include Favorite Artist and Favorite Song for "Soy" at the 2016 Argentine Kids' Choice Awards, Best Latin America South Act at the 2016 MTV Europe Music Awards, Argentine Artist of the Year at the 2016 MTV Millennial Awards, and nominations for Best Actress at both the 2016 Seoul International Drama Awards and the 2016 Martín Fierro Awards, where she won Best Theme Song for "Tengo Esperanza". The singer became the first ever Argentine artist to enter the Billboard Social 50 and Artist 100 charts, peaking at No. 2 and No. 69, respectively.

In July and November, respectively, Espósito released "Una Na" and "Tu Novia" as the first two singles from her upcoming third studio album. The former one rapidly reached the top of the Argentine National Songs chart. In November, the singer kicked off her second concert tour in support of Soy, titled Lali en Vivo, with two sold-out shows at the Luna Park Arena.

In that period of time, Lali was the most popular in the global ranking of different topics in multilingual Wikipedia.

=== 2018–2019: Brava, ACUSADA and Talento FOX ===
From January to July, the singer continued with her Lali en Vivo tour, which visited Peru, Spain, Italy, Israel and the United States. In February, Espósito was featured on Mau y Ricky and Karol G's remix of "Mi Mala", with Becky G and Leslie Grace, and, in May, she teamed up with CD9 and Ana Mena for the remix of "Prohibido". Preceded by the release of "100 Grados", in April, and "Besarte Mucho", in July, the singer released her third studio album, Brava, in August 2018. One week later, the album received a gold certification by the Argentine Chamber of Phonograms and Videograms Producers for having sold ten thousand copies. Espósito embarked on the Brava Tour immediately after the album release, on 23 August, with two sold-out shows at the Luna Park Arena. The album was succeeded by the release of the singles "Sin Querer Queriendo" with Mau y Ricky, and "Caliente", with Brazilian drag queen Pabllo Vittar. The singles peaked at number 14 and 51 on the Billboard Argentina Hot 100, respectively.

Outside of recording music, Espósito made her debut as a judge on Fox Latin America's original television talent show Talento FOX. In September, Espósito starred in the film The Accused, as Dolores Dreier, a girl accused of killing her best friend. The film was directed by Gonzalo Tobal, and it made its premiere in the main competition of the 75th Venice International Film Festival.

Lali started off 2019 performing in Times Square, New York City, for Univision's Countdown Feliz 2019. Early that year, the music video for "Lindo Pero Bruto", her collaboration with Thalía, was released. The singer received notable nominations for the Premio Lo Nuestro and the Billboard Latin Music Awards. During the first months of the year, Lali continued touring with Brava, which was certified four times platinum in Argentina. For the 21st Annual Gardel Awards, Lali won three awards, the most of the night, in the categories for Best Female Pop Album and Best Cover Design for Brava, and Song of the Year for "Sin Querer Queriendo".

In the last months of 2019, Lali took her Brava Tour to Europe, the United States and the Rock in Rio music festival in Brazil, where she also received a gold certification for "Caliente." It was in these months that Lali officially kicked off her fourth music era: in October, she released her fourth studio album's lead single, "Laligera", which peaked at number 24 on the Billboard Argentina Hot 100; in November, she released "Como Así", which features boy band CNCO, with whom she co-hosted the 2019 Premios Juventud ceremony back in July.

=== 2020–2021: Libra and Sky Rojo ===
The year 2020 saw the release of Lali's fourth studio album titled Libra, which reached the number one position in Argentina. The album was preceded by the release of three more singles, namely "Lo Que Tengo Yo", "Fascinada" and "Ladrón" with Argentine trap singer Cazzu. At the 23rd Annual Gardel Awards, Libra earned a nomination for Best Pop Album, a recognition of its musical excellence. Although the album didn't clinch the award, Lali added another accolade to her name by securing the Song of the Year award for "Ladrón". This marked her second victory in this category, the first being in 2019. 2020 was also marked by collaborations as Lali was featured in Los Ángeles Azules's "Las Maravillas de La Vida", Fito Páez's "Gente en la Calle" and the Dvicio-duet "Soy de Volar". Lali was also part of the charity single "Color Esperanza 2020" alongside Diego Torres, Thalía, Camilo, Carlos Vives, Manuel Turizo, Rauw Alejandro, Ivete Sangalo and others. The song was released as a joint effort by Sony Music Latin and Global Citizen to benefit the Pan American Health Organization's (PAHO) response to the COVID-19 pandemic.

In 2020, the filming of the Netflix series Sky Rojo became a significant chapter for Lali, requiring her to relocate indefinitely to Spain. Commencing in November 2019 in Madrid, the originally planned four-month shooting schedule was disrupted due to the onset of the COVID-19 pandemic in March 2020, halting production. This unforeseen circumstance not only interrupted the series' filming but also impacted the release of Lali's album, Libra. Amidst the uncertainties, Lali managed to return to Argentina before the nationwide lockdown and underwent quarantine in her Buenos Aires residence. In November, she disclosed testing positive for COVID-19, a challenge faced by many members of the Sky Rojo team between June and November. Despite the setbacks, Sky Rojo premiered in March 2021, showcasing Lali in the role of Wendy, one of three prostitutes seeking freedom while evading their pimp and his henchmen. The series garnered an enthusiastic response from both audiences and critics alike. Sheena Scott of Forbes acknowledged Lali's impact, noting that the series topped Netflix's charts as the number one TV show in Argentina during its launch weekend. Described by The New York Times as "sheer excess" for its "simultaneously minimal and over-the-top" plot, Sky Rojo not only secured widespread acclaim but also earned a renewal for two additional seasons. The culmination of this success came with the third instalment in January 2023.

Between June and September 2021, Lali took on the role of coach for the third season of La Voz Argentina, the localized rendition of The Voice, where she ended up in third position. The following year, Lali came back as a coach for the fourth season of the competition and ended up as the runner-up.

=== 2022–present: Lali and El fin del amor ===
After a hiatus of over two years from the music scene, Lali made a return in early 2022 with the trilogy of singles "Disciplina" "Diva" and "Como Tú". These releases served as a preview to her upcoming fifth studio album, marking a significant shift from her previous urban sound as she embraced a return to pop music. Concurrently, Lali announced her Disciplina Tour, which kicked off in June 2023 and promptly became a record-breaking sensation selling out arenas and stadiums across Latin America, Europe, and Asia. In the same month, Lali dropped "N5" a chart-topping single that soared to number nine on the Billboard Argentina Hot 100, her highest entry on the chart. The track achieved gold certification in the country, symbolizing its widespread acclaim and success. Notably, "N5" also marked a pivotal moment in Lali's career, as it became the first song where she openly embraced her bisexuality, garnering admiration for her authenticity and openness. The year 2022 continued to be a prolific one for Lali, witnessing the releases of "2 Son 3" and "Motiveishon", the latter coinciding with the Buenos Aires Pride, showcasing her commitment to inclusivity and celebration of diverse identities through her music.

In March 2023, Lali reached new heights as she brought her Disciplina Tour to the iconic José Amalfitani Stadium in Buenos Aires, captivating a sold-out audience of over 50,000 and etching her name in history as the first Argentine woman to achieve a stadium sell-out at this grand scale. A mere month later, the singer unveiled her highly anticipated fifth studio album, Lali. This marked a triumphant return to her pop music roots, a departure from the Latin sounds of reggaeton and trap explored in her previous records Brava (2018) and Libra (2020). The record was hailed as "an ode to pop music" where the artist revisited her diverse musical influences, creating a nostalgic yet contemporary piece. Described as her "most pop album", Lali blended sounds and elements reminiscent of the late nineties and early two-thousands pop era, drawing inspiration from icons like Britney Spears, NSYNC, and Jennifer Lopez. Music critics lauded the album for its production, lyrical content, concept, and clever references to pop culture. Commercially, the album made an impressive debut at number one in Argentina within a mere three tracking days, maintaining its dominance for six weeks. Mirroring its success, Lali also claimed the top spot in Uruguay. Fueled by the infectious melodies of the top 20 single "Obsesión" and the witty track "Quiénes Son?" the album solidified Lali's status as the "Queen of Argentine Pop". To complement the album's success, the Lali Tour embarked on a global journey, captivating audiences across France, Switzerland, Italy, Spain, Israel, Mexico, and Argentina.

She produced and played the lead role in the Prime Video series El fin del amor in 2022. The series is based on the 2019 essay El fin del amor, querer y coger by Tamara Tenenbaum, aboutan Orthodox Jewish woman walking away from her traditional life. At the 2023 Silver Condor Series Awards, Lali won the Best Lead Actress in a Comedy or Musical Series award for her role as Tenenbaum. Originally commissioned with a straight-to-series order of 10 episodes, El fin del amor garnered acclaim for its thought-provoking exploration of societal norms and personal growth. The series resonated so profoundly with audiences that it earned a well-deserved renewal for a second season, scheduled to premiere in 2024. In 2024, Lali became a judge on Factor X, the Spanish version of The X Factor. In 2025, Lali returned as a coach on the fifth season of La Voz Argentina.

== Other work ==
=== Modelling ===
Espósito has been a spokesperson for numerous brands, either independently or with her Teen Angels bandmates. Her first commercial was for the children's fashion label MCbody Jeans. In 2007, she signed an exclusive contract with the Argentine lingerie brand Promesse, and she has done most of her photo sessions with Luisana Lopilato. In 2009, Espósito and Peter Lanzani did a special promotion for KEFF body spray for the Israeli market. Between 2013 and 2014, she was the spokesperson for the lingerie brand Lara Teens. In 2014, she starred in a commercial for hair conditioner Biokur in Uruguay and a commercial for feminine wipes company Carefree in Argentina.

From 2014 to 2016, she starred in commercials for Claro. Also, from 2015 to 201,7 she was an ambassador and star in commercials for the hair care brand Sedal, she would again be an ambassador and star in a commercial for the brand in 2021. In 2018, she starred in commercials for Panacom and Terma. In 2019, she would stars commercial for Toyota and M&M'S, Espósito starred in a commercial, which would be one of the official faces for Garnier. In October 2021, Espósito, along with Bizarrap, L-Gante, Nicki Nicole and Duki starred in commercials for the beer brand, Brahma. In 2022, she starred in a commercial for Gancia.

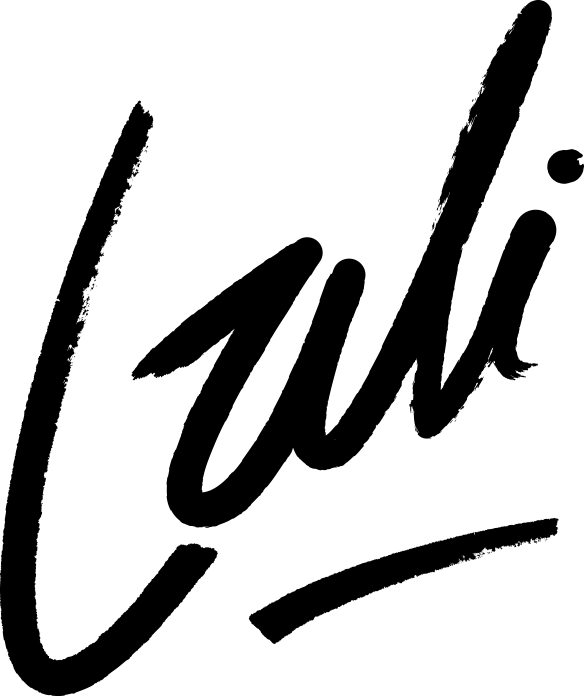
Espósito's logo as a solo artist

Espósito has been the cover model for magazines such as Billboard, Galore, Vogue Latin America, Caras, OnMag, Las Rosas, Twees, Seventeen, Cosmopolitan, Luz, Viva, Watt, Nueva, Upss and Fack, among others.

=== Entrepreneurship ===
On 21 September 2013, Espósito launched her own line of eponymous perfumes. In 2018, she launched a clothing collection with 47 Street.

=== Philanthropy ===
In May 2010, Espósito and her Teen Angels bandmates participated in an action organized by the Biodiversity Foundation on the occasion of the World Biodiversity Day and raised awareness of the importance of preserving biodiversity.

Espósito has been named "Godmother" of Dono x Vos foundation, a nongovernmental organization dedicated to raising awareness about organ donation. In 2017, the singer joined forces with Red Solidaria and River Plate Football Club to launch a solidarity campaign named "Amor Es Presente". The campaign received donated toys that were later gifted to more than twelve-thousand children as part of Christmas festivities.

== Social activism ==
Espósito is part of a feminist group of Argentine actresses and singers, such as Jimena Barón, Griselda Siciliani, Carla Peterson, Florencia Peña and Florencia de la V, among others. Espósito has declared herself in favour of the Voluntary Interruption of Pregnancy Bill in Argentina, where abortion was still illegal at the time. The bill proposed that an abortion may be performed during the first 14 weeks of pregnancy, with no requirements other than the woman's desire. The bill was approved in 2020.

=== Political impact ===
In the latter part of the 2010s, Lali became an advocate in causes related to social, women's, and LGBT rights. Utilizing her considerable success in both her career and public profile, she actively mobilized political engagement, notably contributing to campaigns such as the Voluntary Interruption of Pregnancy Bill and the Transgender Employment Quota Bill in Argentina. As the 2020s unfolded, Lali wielded substantial political influence, a trend that gained momentum following the 2023 Argentine primary elections. Following Milei's victory in August 2023, Lali, disillusioned by the outcome, tweeted, "Qué peligroso. Qué triste" (English: "How dangerous. How sad"). This tweet garnered strong support from Milei's opponents but also triggered intense hatred and harassment from his supporters, party, and the candidate himself. As of August 2026, the tweet gathered over 93.6 million impressions. Lali's words evolved into a rallying cry for both sides, symbolizing either support or protest against Milei. Following the criticism received by Milei's fanatics, Lali added:

"I'm not bothered at all by being insulted for considering it dangerous and sad that there are people who vote for an anti-rights stance. The violence with which they insult and the arguments reflect exactly what they are voting for. We've become accustomed to thinking that if someone has an opinion, it's because they're on "the other side," but the only side I'll 'always' be on (within the current political and economic decadent context we're in) is the one that doesn't disregard the rights we've gained. That is what I think as a responsible young Argentine voter who doesn't only think about themselves. I could choose not to express any opinion, of course, it's the most 'comfortable' option, but I'm not like that, so... yes! For me, it's truly sad and dangerous to vote for such an anti-rights stance."

In light of Lali's words, Lucía Peker of Infobae noted: "The concern expressed by Lali Espósito on social media about the 'danger' of the election results reflects the fear of many women regarding the advance of an electoral force that denies gender violence, wage inequality, and digital violence affecting young women when explicit sexual images are shared."

Despite initially finishing second against Massa in the first round of the 2023 Argentine general election, Milei emerged victorious in the runoff, securing the presidency of Argentina. Since Lali expressed her stance back in August, she has faced relentless backlash. Notably, she has become a target of misinformation propagated by the media aligning with Milei's and Mauricio Macri's positions. False information and distorted figures regarding her participation and compensation for state-organized free shows have been disseminated. While numerous artists, some earning even larger sums, have been engaged by the state for similar performances but have not voiced an opinion, they remain untouched by persecution from the president and his supporters. The spread of these fake news stories has subjected Lali to continuous online and in-person harassment from Libertarian fanatics, turning her into a consistent topic of debate in the media and even resulting in doxxing.

After dismissing such an "absolute delusion" and explaining that the compensation is not only for her but for the more than 200 people working on her shows, Lali metaphorically explained that the hostility towards her was like "foam" created by the president and his media to cover up something bigger. Many connected this to the treatment Omnibus Law proposed by Milei Government.

Political persecution persisted for months, involving ongoing interactions and social media posts by the president directed at Lali. In February 2024, the singer took the stage at the iconic Cosquín Rock festival. During "Quiénes Son?", a song characterized as a sarcastic commentary on online hate culture, she altered the lyrics of one verse to "Que si vivo del Estado" (English: "That I live off the State") in direct response to the actions of Milei and the media. Days later, the president expressed his opinion once again in an interview with La Nación:

"When Córdoba hosts Cosquín Rock, which is a private event, it receives one billion pesos in subsidies. All the artists who were there, for example, Lali 'Depósito,' were paid by the State. But Lali 'Depósito' received payments from various governments. In one of the concerts, she received 350 thousand dollars. So, are you willing to finance those expenses against the VAT that takes away food from poor children in Chaco? To finance that culture, you'll burden it on two-thirds of the children are in poverty conditions. So, what are the priorities [of the governors]? Giving food to the people or filling the pockets of Lali 'Depósito' and having her criticize me at a festival?"

He further explained that he selected "Depósito" (English: deposit) to refer to the singer because, according to him, "she lives off taxpayers at the expense of children's hunger."

The following day, numerous figures from Argentina's music, television, and film industries, as well as politicians and other notable public figures expressed their support for Lali and the right to free expression. The list included María Becerra, Nicki Nicole, Duki, Ricardo Mollo and Catriel Ciavarella of Divididos, Marilina Bertoldi, Andrés Ciro Martínez of Ciro y los Persas, Andrés Calamaro, Dante Spinetta, Juliana Gattas of Miranda!, Leonardo Sbaraglia, Moria Casán, Carla Peterson, Pablo Echarri, Ofelia Fernández, and Guillermo Moreno among many others.

That same day, Lali posted an open letter directed at Milei in which she shared her work history since the age of 10, highlighting her success in television and her dedication to music for over a decade. She also expressed pride in her achievements, including buying a house for her parents and performing in sold-out stadiums. While she stated her respect for Milei's stance on culture, she criticized the demonization of the industry and the unfair perception in his speech. Additionally, she asked the president to choose a path that benefited all citizens and advocates for the freedom to think differently. Finally, she invited him to attend any of her concerts to demonstrate her professionalism on stage.

The case was compared by many to Trump's and Bolsonaro's political persecution of Taylor Swift in the United States and of Pabllo Vittar and Anitta in Brazil, respectively. It prompted Axel Kicillof, governor of the Buenos Aires Province, to assert the importance of investing in culture and to create policies that foster cultural events and protect artists, which was called "the Lali effect".

== Public image ==
In March 2014, 23-year-old Espósito was ranked third sexiest Argentine woman in a survey reported by Radio Continental. That same year, she was ranked the 27th-most influential Spanish-speaking celebrity on Twitter.

== Personal life ==
Espósito's nickname and stage name, Lali, originated from her eldest brother, who mispronounced the short form of her name "Mari" as "Lali". She attended primary school and high school at the Colegio San Vicente De Paul in Parque Patricios.

=== Relationships ===
From 2006 to 2010, Espósito was in a relationship with her Chiquititas and Casi Ángeles co-star Peter Lanzani, whom she called her "first love". The couple is still a fan favourite in Argentina and they remained good friends after their breakup.

In 2010, Espósito began dating singer and actor Benjamín Amadeo after they met in Casi Ángeles. Espósito and Amadeo announced their breakup in 2015, but they and their families remained close friends, making several public appearances together.

From late 2015 to early 2016, Espósito was in a highly publicized relationship with her Esperanza Mía co-star Mariano Martinez. In 2017 Espósito began dating sound engineer Santiago Mocorrea; they broke up in 2020. Since 2024, she has been in a relationship with media personality Pedro Rosemblat. Espósito and Rosemblat married in a private ceremony on October 31, 2026.

== Filmography ==
=== Film ===
Year	Title	Role	Notes
2012	La pelea de mi vida	Belén Estévez	Main role
2013	Teen Angels, el adiós	Herself	Concert film
2014	A los 40	Melissa	Main role
2016	Me casé con un boludo	Herself	Cameo
2016	That's Not Cheating	Camila Boecchi	Lead role
2018	Acusada	Dolores Dreier	Lead role
2019	Claudia	Herself	Singer during the film's opening credits
2023	Puan	Vera Mota	
2025	Verano Trippin	Dolores	Special appearance
2025	Lali: La Que Le Gana al Tiempo	Herself	Documentary
2026	Glaxo	"La Negra" Miranda	

=== Television ===
Year	Title	Role	Notes
2003	Rincón de Luz	Malena "Coco" Cabrera	Main cast
2004–2005	Floricienta	Roberta Espinosa	Main cast
2006	Chiquititas Sin Fin	Agustina Ross	Main cast
2007–2010	Casi Ángeles	Marianella "Mar" Rinaldi	Lead role
2011	Cuando me sonreís	Milagros Rivas	Main cast
2012	Dulce amor	Ana	Episode #1.36
2013	Solamente vos	Daniela Cousteau	Main cast
2015–2016	Esperanza mía	Julia Albarracín / Esperanza	Lead role
2018	El Host	Herself	Episode #1.10
2018	Sandro de América	Reyna Ross	Episodes: "El último hombre en la tierra" & "Todo va a estallar"
2021–2023	Sky Rojo	Wendy	Main role
2022, 2025	El fin del amor	Tamara Tenenbaum	Lead role and executive producer
2016	Showmatch: Bailando 2016	Judge	Temporary replacement
2017	Viña del Mar International Festival	Judge	
2018	MTV Diary	Herself	Episode: "Lali"
2018	Talento FOX	Judge	
2021, 2022, 2025	La Voz Argentina	Coach	3rd place (season 3); Runner-up (season 4); TBA (season 5)
2022	9th Platino Awards	Hosted	
2022–2023	El Hormiguero	Life coach	Season 17
2024	Factor X	Judge	Season 4

=== Theatre ===
Year	Title	Role	Location
2003	Rincón de luz	Malena "Coco" Cabrera	Gran Rex
2004–05	Floricienta	Roberta Espinoza	Gran Rex
2006	Chiquititas	Augustina Ross	Gran Rex
2007–10	Casi ángeles	Marianella Rinaldi	Gran Rex
2012	The Crucible	Abigail Williams	Teatro Broadway
2014	Casi Normales	Herself	Teatro Tabarís
2015	Esperanza mía: El musical	Julia Albarracín / Esperanza	Opera Allianz

Events, galas and others

- 2017 - LVIII Festival Internacional de la Canción de Viña del Mar - Judge
- 2022 - Premios Platino de 2022 - Presenter

== Discography ==
Studio albums

- A Bailar (2014)
- Soy (2016)
- Brava (2018)
- Libra (2020)
- Lali (2023)
- No Vayas a Atender Cuando el Demonio Llama (2025)

Collaborative studio albums

- Bailar o Morir (with Miranda! as BOM) (2026)

Soundtrack albums

- Esperanza mía (2015)

== Concert tours ==
Headlining

- A Bailar Tour (2014–16)
- Soy Tour (2016–2017)
- Lali en Vivo (2017–2018)
- Brava Tour (2018–2019)
- Disciplina Tour (2022–2023)
- Lali Tour (2023)
- Lali Tour 2025 (2025–2026)

Co-Headlining

- Bailar o Morir Tour (with Miranda!) (2026–2027)

Opening act

- The Prismatic World Tour (for Katy Perry) (2015)
- The 7/27 Tour (for Fifth Harmony) (2016)
- One World Tour (for Ricky Martin) (2016)
- Witness: The Tour (for Katy Perry) (2018)
- Never Be the Same Tour (for Camila Cabello) (2018)

== Awards and nominations ==
As of September 2021, Espósito has won 51 awards from 115 nominations, including Six Gardel Awards, five MTV Europe Music Awards, one Kids' Choice Award, one Heat Latin Music Award, thirteen Argentine Kids' Choice Awards, six MTV Millennial Awards, one Heat Latin Music Award, one Martin Fierro Award, one Billboard Latin Music Awards and one Tato Award. Moreover, Lali has received nominations for the Premio Lo Nuestro and the Seoul International Drama Awards, among others.
