= Lali Espósito videography =

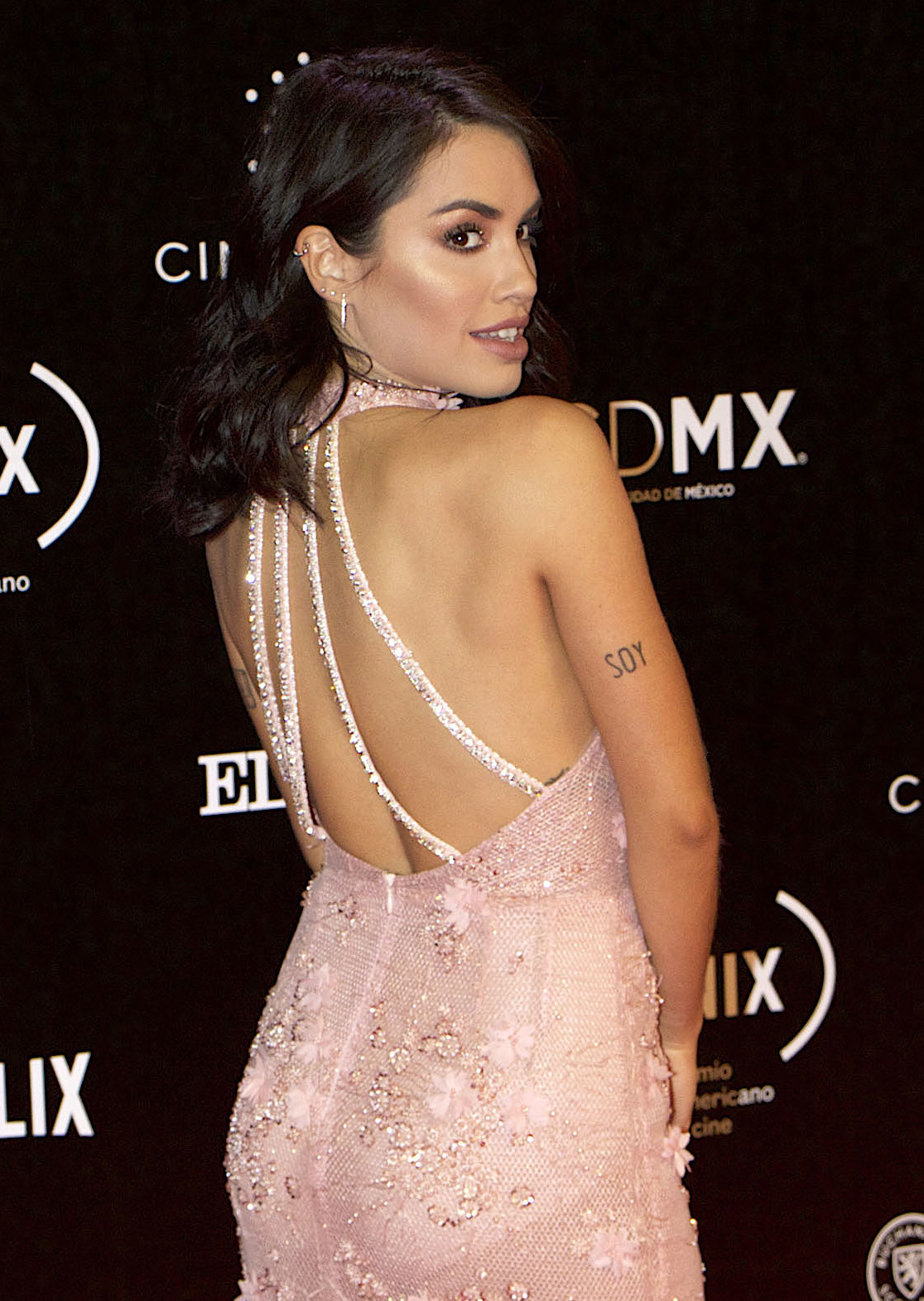
Espósito in 2018

Argentine actress and singer Lali Espósito has featured in forty-two music videos, seven films, eleven television series, six web series and multiple commercials. She has also directed the trailer for a TV series and two of her videoclips. She achieved early fame when she appeared in the Telefe television series Casi Ángeles. From 2007 to 2012, Espósito was part of the teen band Teen Angels, alongside Peter Lanzani, María Eugenia Suárez, Gastón Dalmau, Nicolás Riera and Rocío Igarzábal.

Espósito first television appearance was in Rincón de Luz in 2003 as Malena Coco Cabrera. Through 2004 and 2005, Espósito portrayed Roberta Espinosa in the Argentine telenovela Floricienta. In 2006, the actress portrayed Agustina Ross in Chiquitias Sin Fin, a spin off of the original Chiquititas (1995). From 2007 to 2010 she appeared in the Telefe television series Casi Ángeles by portraying Marianella Rinaldi. Across the duration of the telenovela, there were released the music videos for Espósito's solos "Escaparé" and "Hay Un Lugar" directed by Mariano De María.

In 2011, the singer starred in the Argentine comedy series Cuando Me Sonreís as Milagros Rivas. In 2012 the actress made a cameo appearance as Ana in the telenovela Dulce Amor and also starred in the Argentine comedy film La Pelea de mi Vida as Belén. Espósito portrayed Daniela Costeau in the Argentine series Solamente Vos across 2013, and also appeared in the film Teen Angels: El Adiós which is a live show and documentary about the band's last show before their breaking and in which she starred as herself. The same year, she launched her solo career and released his solo debut single "A Bailar", the music video for which was directed by Juan Ripari. In 2014, Espósito portrayed Melissa in the Peruvian comedy A Los 40 and also released the music videos for "Asesina" and "No Estoy Sola", both directed by Juan Ripari.

In 2015, Espósito portrayed her first lead role in television as Julia Esperanza Albarracín in the Argentine series Esperanza mía alongside Mariano Martínez. Across that year, Espósito released the music videos for "Mil Años Luz", "Del Otro Lado" and "Histeria", also directed by Juan Ripari, and also for "Necesito", which was directed by Sebastian Pivotto. In 2016, the actress made a cameo appearance in the film Me Casé con un Boludo as herself and starred as Camila in the comedy film That's Not Cheating alongside Martín Piroyansky. The same year, Espósito released the lyric video for "Unico" and the music videos for "Soy", "Boomerang", "Mueve" and "Ego" in which she appeared.

== Music videos ==
Title	Year	Other performer(s) credited	Director(s)	Description	Ref.
"No Digas Nada"	2003	Agustín Sierra	Gerardo Mariani; Osvaldo Cappra	Promotional music video filmed for the TV series Rincón de Luz.	
"Escaparé"	2007	None	Mariano De María	Promotional music video filmed for the TV series Casi Ángeles.	
"Hay Un Lugar"	2008	None	Mariano De María	Promotional music video filmed for the TV series Casi Ángeles.	
"A Bailar"	2013	None	Juan Ripari	Features Espósito and six male dancers dancing to the song through multiple scenarios with different looks. Lali can also be seen singing with an old microphone.	
"Asesina"	2014	None	Juan Ripari	Takes place in an abandoned shed. Espósito, accompanied by four female dancers, capture a man, portrayed by Facundo Mazzei. The man escapes, but bumps into Lali. They get involved in a sexy choreography under the rain and end up kissing each other.	
"No Estoy Sola"	2014	None	Juan Ripari	Features close-ups of Espósito, her family, her friends and her boyfriend at the moment, Benjamín Amadeo. Images of fans during her shows can be seen as well. It is included on the deluxe edition of her debut studio album, A Bailar, only.	
"Mil Años Luz"	2015	None	Juan Ripari	The music video for this song is a live performance recorded at a show of Espósito's A Bailar Tour.	
"Del Otro Lado"	2015	None	Juan Ripari	Begins with Espósito laying in a bed wearing a long black dress in black and white. When she goes to the room next door turns to color, her boyfriend is waiting for her, sitting on a sofa. After many shots of them kissing each other, Espósito starts yelling and throwing things at him. Towards the end of the video, the couple stand facing each other and the objects around them vanish, until she stands in the room alone and vanishes too.	
"Necesito"	2015	None	Sebastián Pivotto	Promotional music video filmed for the TV series Esperanza mía.	
"Histeria"	2015	None	Juan Ripari	Features stills of Espósito wearing different-color wigs and outfits, accompanied by her dancers. Towards the end, she appears naked with body painted with multiples tones of silver and blue.	
"Unico"	2016	None	Juan Ripari	Shows close-ups of Espósito naked and with different lipstick colors. While she sings, paint of different colors begins to fall.	
"Soy"	2016	None	Juan Ripari	The video begins with a young girl who portrays Lali in her childhood. The girl plays a cassette and dances to the song. In the next scene, the grown-up Lali is seen on a tunnel that ends up on a night club. During the video the girl also dances and sings with three girls. Then, she is on a stage singing, which is a parallelism between her childhood dream becoming true in the present.	
"Boomerang"	2016	None	Juan Ripari	Espósito portrays six characters (a fitness girl, a TV host, a rich lady, an old women, a taxi driver, and a figure who is supposed to be karma) apart from herself on the cover of a magazine. Throughout the video, each character behaves in a mean or disrespectful way until karma appears and something happens to them. She can also be seen on a white background dancing with four dancers. Espósito mocks fame and media, and laughs at how people believe in everything that they see on television.	
"Mueve"	2016	Abraham Mateo	Hermanos Dawidson	Mateo and Espósito play two spies that infiltrate in a nightclub to steal glowing-golden thing. Since both of them have the same mission, they trick each other to get the suitcase that contains the thing. Espósito seems to win, but when she gets in her car and opens the suitcase, there is a picture of Mateo with the caption "Loser". Mateo is seen leaving the club and looking at the thing, which is never revealed what it is.	
"Ego"	2016	None	Juan Ripari	Filmed in Villa La Angostura, Argentina, Lali is seen in a forest waking up and discovering there are arrows on the floor and on her dress.She starts to take the arrows out of her dress and gets up, but then she looks at a bunch of arrows falling next to her and starts running. Esposito escapes from the arrows, until he stopped and began to cry, but a few seconds later they continue to shoot arrows at him and he escapes again. Towards the end of the video, she finds a bridgeand a dress she takes off the other dress and puts on the one that was on the bridgeand cross the bridge that leads to a better place.	
"Roma-Bangkok"	2017	Baby K	Gaetano Morbioli	Lali and Baby K pose and dance in different locations of Verona, Italy. They are picked up by their lovers in scooters, and finally get to a party on a cruise.	
"Una Na"	2017	None	Juan Ripari	Lali dances with dancers and poses with multiple looks and outfits in different scenarios of the Calchaquí Valleys in Salta Province, Argentina.	
"Tu Novia"	2017	None	Oscar Roho	Features shots of Lali and multiple female models posing in underwear. It contains numerous hidden meanings and references. For example, a banana in flames that stands for female empowerment.	
"Tu Sonrisa"	2017	None	Juan Ripari	It was filmed on the first show of Lali en Vivo at the Luna Park Arena in Buenos Aires, where Lali presented the song.	
"Mi Mala (Remix)"	2018	Mau y Ricky; Karol G Becky G Leslie Grace	David Bohorquez; David Durán	Karol, Becky, Leslie and Lali all get to pose and smize for a camera recording them, but they're not doing it for Mau y Ricky's affection. Instead, the guys get to coolly hang out with their co-stars' faces projecting on screens.	
"100 Grados"	2018	A. Chal	Ariel Winograd; Diego Berakha	Shows multiples versions of Lali and A. Chal, who appear and vanish at the rhythm of the beats, creating a fresh, unique experience.	
"Y Dale Alegría a Mi Corazón"	2018	None	¡Viva Latino! staff	Exclusively for Spotify, it shows Lali recording the song in the studio, as well as many symbols of the Argentine culture.	
"Prohibido (Remix)"	2018	CD9 and Ana Mena	Broducers	The five members of CD9, Ana Mena and Lali hang out at a party, where they mimic and dance to the song.	
"Besarte Mucho"	2018	None	Diego Berakha	Lali portrays a rich woman who collects mannequins. She arrives to her mansion to meet a man that she uses to satisfies her sexual needs. Throughout the video, Lali dances a sensual choreography accompanied by her dancers, and performs a mixture of bachata, merengue and tango number with the man.	
"Todo a Pulmón"	2018	Alejandro Lerner; Abel Pintos; Axel; León Gieco; Rolando Sartorio; Sandra Mihanovich; Soledad Pastorutti	The Vrodas	Shows each artist recording the song in the studio.	
"Sin Querer Queriendo"	2018	Mau y Ricky	Diego Berakha	Lali seduces Mau y Ricky in a minimalistic and colorful set. The three of them wear jeans clothes as they rotate on top of a rotating platform. Lali also performs a choreography accompanied by four female dancers. The video aims to represent Lali and Mau y Ricky's friendship and goodvibes.	
"Caliente"	2018	Pabllo Vittar	Os Primos	Shows Lali and Pabllo in colorful bathing suits on the beaches of Rio de Janeiro. The video shows everything the two artists portray through their music: party, fun, good vibes and lots of dancing. Lali and Pabllo also play a football match on the beach wearing each other's national team, symbolizing the end of the rivalry between Argentina and Brazil.	
"Lindo Pero Bruto"	2019	Thalía	Daniel Duran	Thalía and Lali give life to a Barbie-inspired world filled with many neon colors, sweet treats, and dolls. Thalía and Lali play two female thinkers who are in a laboratory creating a futuristic machine to build a male prototype — in other words, the perfect man. However, they are the ones who become dolls. The music video was inspired by the 1985 film Weird Science.	
"Somos Amantes"	2019	None	Lali Espósito; Nicolás Gorla	The clip begins with Lali lying on her bed after her lover left. Although he never appears, her lover tries to reach Lali by the phone, but she does not want to make him part of her life. Then she starts having fun and forgetting about her lover, in other scenes Lali can be seen wearing different outfits and dancing with dancers.. The video mirrors the values of female empowerment by showing strong women guided by well-known characters and important influences for Lali, such as Frida Kahlo and her own grandmother.	
"Laligera"	2019	None	Orco	Filmed in the porteño neighborhood of Parque Patricios, where Lali was born, the music video shows her skating in a basketball court and scenes of her hanging out with a group of dancers. The clip also features cameos by Gimena Accardi and Candela Vetrano.	
"Como Así"	2019	CNCO	Joaquín Cambre	Lali portrays the love interest for each of the CNCO members, with each scene telling a different story.	
"Salta La Comba"	2019	Pinto "Wahin"	Daniel Duran	The music video shows a group of people of all ages working out, dancing, and jumping rope joined by Pinto and Lali's fierce dance choreography.	
"Lo Que Tengo Yo"	2020	None	Guido Adler; Lautaro Espósito	Recorded in the midst of the coronavirus quarantine, the "colorful and playful" homemade music video shows Lali joined by fans of all ages and from all over the world busting their best dance moves from their homes.	
"Las Maravillas de la Vida"	2020	Los Ángeles Azules	Diego Álvarez	The video shows a live performance of the song by Lali and Los Ángeles Azules from the Unione e Benevolenza Hall in Buenos Aires.	
"Fascinada"	2020	None	Fernando Rochese	The music video shows a tropical and psychedelic aesthetic, with changing and surreal elements that enhance the romantic story with her lover within the song. In this video, Lali delivers all her talent, including intricate choreography and extravagant costumes.	
"Soy de Volar"	2020	Dvicio	Willy Rodríguez	As the lyrics to the song suggest, Lali and Andrés Ceballos move in together. With the rest of the Dvicio members, Lali and Andrés take boxes with their stuff to their new apartment while they have fun. At the end of the video, Lali and Andrés have a romantic date and end up kissing. The video was shot using a single continuous tracking shot.	
"Ladrón"	2020	Cazzu	Lali Espósito	In the black and white clip, Lali and Cazzu are portrayed as divas seating and thrones and dancing to the song, while lyrics are projected over them. Lali can also be seen dancing with four dancers.	
"Gente en la Calle"	2021	Fito Páez	Guido Adler; Alejandro Ros	Lali and Páez interact in a street-like set with huge traffic lights in front of screens that project real-life images of Buenos Aires and people living in its streets.	
"Disciplina"	2022	None	Renderpanic	Following the BDSM-themed lyrics, Lali portrays a dominatrix. She also performs energetic choreographies in an industrial set that resembles Berlin's raves. Until they end up exhausted and fall to the ground. In other shots of the video, Lali can be seen singing while climbing a chain.	
"Diva"	2022	None	Renderpanic	It shows Lali coming out of a vault and getting on a circular stage to perform the song. The camera surrounds the protagonist dancing, while a group of people watch her from afar and her body is progressively covered in gold until she becomes a gold statue.	
"Como Tú"	2022	None	Renderpanic	In the official video clip, she is seen performing a modern malambo with the Malevo group. At the end of the video you can see a Lali dressed in black with a cigarette in her mouth killing her other self with a shotgun.	
"Cuanto Antes"	2022	Álex Ubago	Mario Ruiz	Lali and Álex Ubago portray a couple who have parted ways and are singing to each other through the phone about wanting to make amends. The couple is seen sitting on a bed looking in opposite directions while progressively turning around and looking at each other. They both end up kissing in the rain.	
"N5"	2022	None	Lautaro Furiolo	After Lali and a woman exchange glances at a fancy dinner, they both leave to a private room where they perform a choreography. They leave and make out in a car which takes them to a party where they dance with a bunch of queer people. At the end of the clip, it is revealed that everything had happened in Lali's mind. The video features guest appearances by Leonardo Sbaraglia and Verónica Llinás.	
"2 Son 3"	2022	None	Juan Gonzs	Lali is the last human being on Earth who has not received a lobotomy. On the verge of becoming insane, she turns herself in where conservative men torture her and try to brainwash her. Despite the multiple attempts, they are not successful and Lali escapes. The entire clip is a metaphor of people's strength and determination against society's conservativism.	
"Quiero Todo"	2022	Soledad; Natalia Oreiro	Guido Adler; Lautaro Espósito	Soledad picks Lali and Natalia Oreiro up after the three divas are shown finishing a hard-day work at their jobs as singers, actors and TV personalities. The three of them go to a street party and dance until the police arrives.	
"Motiveishon"	2022	None	Espósitos Brothers	The video was filmed during Lali's stops in Tel Aviv during her Disciplina Tour. It combines images of Lali and her team parying and dancing with frames from the shows.	
"Yo Te Diré"	2023	Miranda!	Melanie Anton Def	Lali enters Hotel Miranda! showing off her big personality while the duo is sitting in the lounge. From the moment she gets to her room, Lali feels that something odd is going on. Towards the end of the clip, Lali is abducted by the hotel's staff and ends up becoming the receptionist. The aduiovisual piece features multiple references to popular films such as Psycho, The Shining, Mermaids, The Grand Budapest Hotel, West Side Story and Metropolis.	
"Una Vez Más"	2023	Pedro Capó	Andrés Ibáñez Díaz Infante	The clip portray Lali and Pedro Capó as an ex-couple who are on their way to meet each other one more time.	
"Cómprame un Brishito"	2023	None	Lali Espósito	Lali's gang has a street encounter with another gang in which they demand a diamond with stimulant properties in exchange of setting a hostage free. After putting the gem on her mouth and performing a choreography with her crew, Lali reveals that the hostage was actually another member of her gang, so the other group leaves after being scammed and threatened with weapons. Damián Betular makes a guest appearance on the video.	
"Obsesión"	2023	None	Lautaro Espósito	Lali and her dance coach have had a secret relationship but now they are not longer dating. In class, she notices, from the way he used to treat her, that she has a new relationship with one of Lali's classmates. Heartbroken, Lali walks the streets of Madrid while she performs a professional dance rotuine at the dance studio. The clip references Flashdance and features Juan Minujín as the dance coach.	

=== Guest appearances ===
Title	Year	Performer(s)	Director(s)	Description	Ref.
"Cumbia del Permitido"	2016	Abel Ayala	Ariel Winograd	Lali and other members of the That's Not Cheating cast appear dancing to the song.	
"La Memoria"	2016	Artists for Memoria AMIA	Sebastián Orgambide	Lali is featured singing the lyric "Dejaron su sangre en el lodo" in the video.	
"Paren de Matarnos"	2018	Miss Bolivia	Daniel Ortega and Gabriel Nicoli	Lali appears miming some lyrics throughout the video.	
"¿Qué Vas a Hacer?"	2018	Ricardo Montaner	Marlene Rodriguez	Different scenes show Lali and J Balvin dancing together, making out, getting hot and heavy in bed, and saying farewell to each other after a breakup: their romantic relationship go from puppy love to heartbreak in less than four minutes.	
"Contigo"	2020	Danna Paola	Rodrigo Aroca	Lali appears dancing and miming some lyrics from her home, amid the coronavirus quarantine.	
"Cómo Dormiste?"	2022	Rels B	Unknown	Lali and Rels B record an intimate and romantic European summer with their cellphones showing themselves naked in a jacuzzi, having fun and living their best lives on a yacht in the Mediterranean Sea.	
"Darling"	2022	Nicki Nicole	Jess Prasnik	Lali appears as a guest at Nicki Nicole's concert, acting as a vigilante who reveals an infidelity.	
"La Baby"	2023	Tainy; Daddy Yankee; Feid; Sech	Elliot Muscatt; Jack Peros	Lali and other seven singers like Camila Cabello and Becky G mouth the lyrics as they do mundane daily tasks like their makeup, brushing their teeth, driving, dancing, hugging their dog, and going hard at the gym.	

== Filmography ==
Key
†	Denotes films that have not yet been released

Year	Title	Role(s)	Director	Audience	Box Office (USD)	Ref.
2012	La Pelea de Mi Vida	Belén Estévez	Jorge Nisco	35,989	586,530	
2013	Teen Angels: El Adiós 3D	Herself	Juan Manuel Jimenez	19,681	168,161	
2014	Back to School	Melissa	Bruno Ascenzo	1,199,343	6,411,771	
2016	That's Not Cheating	Camila Boecchi	Ariel Winograd	391,702	1,976,967	
2018	The Accused	Dolores Dreier	Gonzalo Tobal	392,745	1,589,812	
2026	Glaxo	Miranda	Benjamín Naishtat	To be released		

=== Cameo appearances ===
List of films, showing year, role portrayed and director
Year	Title	Role	Ref.
2016	Me casé con un boludo	Lali appears as herself beside Gimena Accardi and Mariana Fabbiani as guest of a party.	
2019	Claudia	Lali appears a singer during the film's opening credits performing "Voy a Dejar Esta Casa, Papá".	
2023	Puan	Vera Motta	

=== Short films ===
List of short films, showing year and role portrayed
Year	Title	Role
2023	Mi Fiesta	Herself

== Television ==
List of television appearances, showing year, role portrayed and selected notes
Year	Title	Role(s)	Network	Notes	Ref.
2003	Rincón de Luz	Malena Cabrera / Coco	Telefe	Main cast	
2004–2005	Floricienta	Roberta Espinosa	Telefe	Main cast	
2006	Chiquititas Sin Fin	Agustina Ross	Telefe	Main cast	
2007–2010	Casi Ángeles	Marianella Rinaldi	Telefe	Lead Role	
2011	Cuando Me Sonreís	Milagros Rivas	Telefe	Main cast	
2012	Dulce Amor	Ana	Telefe	Special guest, one episode	
2013	Solamente Vos	Daniela Costeau	El Trece	Main cast	
2015–2016	Esperanza Mía	Julia Esperanza Albarracín	El Trece	Lead role	
2017	Showmatch	Makeup seller	El Trece	Cameo appearance	
2018	Sandro de América	Reyna Ross	Telefe	Special guest, two episodes	
2018	El Host	Herself	Fox	Special guest	
2021–2023	Sky Rojo	Wendy	Netflix	Lead role	
2022–2025	El Fin del Amor	Tamara Tenenbaum	Amazon Prime Video	Lead role	
2026	Margarita	Roberta Espinosa	HBO Max	Cameo appearance	

=== Reality competitions and specials ===
List of reality competition and special appearances, showing year, role portrayed and selected notes
Year	Title	Role(s)	Network	Notes	Ref.
2018	MTV Diary	Herself	MTV	Documentary special about Lali's life	
2018	Talento FOX	Herself (Judge)	Fox	Singing competition	
2019	2019 Premios Juventud	Herself (Host)	Univision	Music awards show	
2021	MasterChef Celebrity Argentina	Herself (Guest, team captain)	Telefe	Season 2, cooking competition	
2021–2022, 2026	La Voz Argentina	Herself (Coach)	Telefe	Seasons 3—5, singing competition	
2022	9th Platino Awards	Herself (Host)	RTVE Play	Film awards show	
2023	Disciplina Tour Live from Buenos Aires	Herself	Star+; Disney+	Special live broadcast	
2024	Factor X	Herself (Judge)	Telecinco	Season 4, Spanish singing competition	

=== Other ===
Other TV appearances
Title	Year	Channel	Country	Ref.
A todo o nada	2013	El Trece	Argentina	
El Mundo desde Abajo	2013	TBS	Argentina	
AM, Antes del Mediodía	2014	Telefe	Argentina	
Pura Química	2014	ESPN	Argentina	
Bailando por un Sueño	2014	El Trece	Argentina	
Almorzando con Mirtha Legrand	2014	El Trece	Argentina	
Susana Giménez	2014	Telefe	Argentina	
Un sol para los chicos	2015	El Trece	Argentina	
La noche de Mirtha	2015	El Trece	Argentina	
Laten Argentinos	2016	Telefe	Argentina	
Animales Sueltos	2016	América	Argentina	
Hayom BaLayla	2016	Channel 2	Israel	
Almorzando con Mirtha Legrand	2016	El Trece	Argentina	
Nunca Es Tarde	2016	Fox Sports	Argentina	
Pura Química	2016	ESPN	Argentina	
Morfi, todos a la mesa	2016	Telefe	Argentina	
¡Qué Gusto!	2016	GamaTV	Ecuador	
Wantan Night	2016	Movistar Plus	Peru	
Bien por Casa	2016	TV Perú	Peru	
El Hub	2016	Non Stop People	Spain	
La Única Tarde	2016	Unicanal	Mexico	
Hoy Mismo	2016	FOROtv	Mexico	
Ricardo Rocha en Fórmula	2016	TeleFórmula	Mexico	
RMS 24/7	2016	Ritmoson	Mexico	
El diario de Mariana	2016	El Trece	Argentina	
Mejor de Noche	2016	Canal 9	Argentina	
Susana Giménez	2016	Telefe	Argentina	
Bailando por un Sueño	2016	El Trece	Argentina	
Telediario	2016	MMTV	Mexico	
Día a Día	2016	GDL	Mexico	
Hoy	2016	Las Estrellas	Mexico	
Bailando por un Sueño	2016	El Trece	Argentina	
Susana Giménez	2016	Telefe	Argentina	
Cortá por Lozano	2017	Telefe	Argentina	
La mañana	2017	CHV	Chile	
La movida	2017	Canal 13	Chile	
ShowBiz	2017	CNN	United States	
La Hora Hola	2017	Hola TV	United States	
Noticias Univision	2017	Univision	United States	
Morfi, todos a la mesa	2017	Telefe	Argentina	
Bienvenidos	2017	Canal 13	Chile	
Línea de Tiempo	2017	Telefe	Argentina	
Susana Giménez	2017	Telefe	Argentina	
Almorzando con Mirtha Legrand	2017	El Trece	Argentina	
Por el mundo	2018	Telefe	Argentina	
Estando contigo	2018	CMM TV	Spain	
Almorzando con Mirtha Legrand	2018	El Trece	Argentina	
PH, podemos hablar	2018	Telefe	Argentina	
El Hormiguero	2021	Antena 3	Spain	
La Resistencia	2021	#0	Spain	

== Live performances ==
=== Performances at award shows ===
Date	Event	Country	Performed song(s)	Ref.
29 October 2014	2014 Kids' Choice Awards Argentina	Argentina	"Diamonds" "Fancy" "Happy" (with Ángela Torres, Oriana Sabatini and Benjamin Amadeo)	
2 June 2015	17th Annual Gardel Awards	Argentina	"Mil Años Luz"	
22 October 2015	2015 Kids' Choice Awards Argentina	Argentina	"Histeria" "Mil Años Luz"	
4 June 2017	2017 MTV Millennial Awards	Mexico	"Soy" "Boomerang"	
6 June 2017	19th Annual Gardel Awards	Argentina	"Ego" "Boomerang" "Soy"	
21 October 2017	2017 Kids' Choice Awards Argentina	Argentina	"Mueve" (with Abraham Mateo) "Una Na"	
3 June 2018	2018 Martin Fierro Awards	Argentina	"100 Grados" "Tu Novia" "Una Na"	
21 February 2019	Premio Lo Nuestro 2019	United States	"Lindo Pero Bruto" (with Thalía) "No me acuerdo" (with Thalía and Natti Natasha)	
12 May 2019	6th Platino Awards	Mexico	"100 Grados" "Sin Querer Queriendo" "Caliente"	
14 May 2019	21st Annual Gardel Awards	Argentina	"Fuiste" "No Quiero Trabajar" (with Mono, Cucho Parisi and Los Tekis)	
18 July 2019	2019 Premios Juventud	United States	"Calma (Remix)" (with Pedro Capó and Farruko)	
1 May 2022	9th Platino Awards	Spain	"Disciplina"	
28 May 2024	26th Annual Premios Gardel	Argentina	"Disciplina"	

=== Performances at television shows and specials ===
Date	Event	Country	Performed song(s)	Ref.
12 October 2013	The U-Mix Show	Argentina	"A Bailar"	
13 April 2014	Almorzando con Mirtha Legrand	Argentina	"Cielo Salvador"	
2 June 2014	The U-Mix Show	Argentina	"Del Otro Lado "Cielo Salvador"	
8 August 2014	Un sol para los chicos	Argentina	"Histeria "No Estoy Sola" "A Bailar"	
11 September 2014	Bailando por un Sueño	Argentina	"A Bailar" "Asesina"	
19 November 2014	Susana Giménez	Argentina	"Mil Años Luz" "A Bailar"	
11 May 2015	Showmatch	Argentina	"Mil Años Luz" "Tengo Esperanza"	
21 December 2015	Bailando por un Sueño	Argentina	"Tengo Esperanza" "Cómo Haremos "Histeria" "A Bailar"	
21 February 2016	Laten Argentinos	Argentina	"Histeria" "A Bailar" "Mil Años Luz"	
30 May 2016	Showmatch	Argentina	"Unico" "Soy"	
7 August 2016	Susana Giménez	Argentina	"Unico" "Boomerang" "Soy"	
13 August 2016	Un sol para los chicos	Argentina	"Unico" "Boomerang" "Mil Años Luz" "A Bailar" "Soy"	
25 November 2016	Hoy	Mexico	"Soy"	
18 December 2016	Susana Giménez	Argentina	"Ego" "Boomerang"	
28 April 2017	Morfi, todos a la mesa	Argentina	"Amor Es Presente" "Tu Revolución" "Boomerang" "Don't Stop Me Now"	
25 May 2017	Vértigo	Chile	"Soy"	
26 May 2017	Bienvenidos	Chile	"Boomerang"	
6 August 2017	Susana Giménez	Argentina	"Una Na" "Boomerang"	
10 July 2018	Viva el Mundial y Más	United States	"100 Grados" (with A. Chal)	
11 July 2018	¡Despierta América!	United States	"100 Grados" (with A. Chal)	
20 July 2018	Estando contigo	Spain	"Una Na"	
5 September 2018	Talento FOX	Latin America	"Downtown", "100 Grados" (with Anitta)	
26 September 2018	Rojo	Chile	"100 Grados" "Sin Querer Queriendo"	
31 October 2018	El Host	Latin America	"Besarte Mucho"	
14 November 2018	Talento FOX	Latin America	"Besarte Mucho"	
31 December 2018	Countdown Feliz 2019	United States	"Mi Mala (Remix)", "Sin Querer Queriendo" (with Mau y Ricky)	
17 November 2019	Susana Giménez	Argentina	"Laligera"	
12 September 2020	Confesiones, secretos y canciones	Argentina	"A Bailar" "Sin Querer Queriendo" "100 Grados" "Tu Sonrisa" "Soy" "Boomerang" (with elements of "Reina") "Amor Es Presente" "Ego" "Caliente"	
25 October 2020	El debate de las tentaciones	Spain	"Soy de Volar" (with Dvicio)	
18 August 2021	La Voz Argentina	Argentina	"Soy" (with Team Lali)	
26 August 2021	La Voz Argentina	Argentina	"Pronta Entrega", "Lo Que Sangra (La Cúpula)", "Levitating" (with Team Lali)	
29 August 2021	La Voz Argentina	Argentina	"Ya Me Fui", "Boomerang" (with Nicki Nicole)	
5 September 2021	La Voz Argentina	Argentina	"Amor Es Presente", "Laligera" (with Nicolás Olmedo of Team Lali)	
10 June 2024	Factor X	Spain	"Disciplina"	

== Direction ==
List of projects directed by Lali
Year	Title	Notes	Ref
2019	La suerte de Loli	TV series, trailer director	
2019	"Somos Amantes"	Videoclip, co-director	
2020	"Ladrón"	Videoclip, director	
2023	"Cómprame un Brishito"	Videoclip, director	
2023	"Obsesión"	Videoclip, co-director	
2023	"Quiénes Son?"	Videoclip, director	
2023	Mi Fiesta	Short film/videoclip, director	
2024	"Fanático"	Videoclip, director	
2024	"No Me Importa"	Videoclip, director	
2025	"Mejor Que Vos"	Videoclip, director	

== Web ==
List of web appearances, showing year, streaming service and selected notes
Year	Title	Notes	Ref.
2014–2015	Eléctrica	Special guest; Episodes #1.7 and #2.3	
2014	Tiempo Libre	Special guest; Episode #17	
2014	#FAMOSO	Special guest; Episode #2.8	
2015	#ABailarTour: Detrás de Escena	Mini-documentary; 9 episodes	
2016	#SOY: Behind The Scenes	Mini-documentary; 11 episodes	
2016	No Soy Como Tú Crees	Special guest, Episode #1	
2021	El Show de Lali	Host; backstage of Sky Rojo	

== Commercials ==
List of commercials, showing company, year and director(s)
Year	Company	Ref.
2009	Keff Israel	
2014	Bio Kur Uruguay	
2014–2015	Carefree	
2014–2016	Claro Música	
2015–2016	Sedal	
