= Soy Tour =

2016–17 concert tour by Lali

- Tour by Lali
- Associated album: Soy
- Start date: September 8, 2016
- End date: June 17, 2017
- Legs: 5
- No. of shows: 40 in South America; 4 in Europe; 1 in Asia; 45 in total

Lali concert chronology
- A Bailar Tour (2014–16); Soy Tour (2016–17); Lali en Vivo (2017–18)

The Soy Tour was the second headlining concert tour by Argentine singer Lali, in support of her second studio album, Soy (2016). The tour began on September 8, 2016 in Buenos Aires at the Opera Allianz Theatre and ended on June 17, 2017, in Santiago at Teatro Teletón.

== Background ==
Espósito confirmed plans of a tour in support of the album via previous live chats and TV interviews. On May 27, 2016, Espósito released the first dates of the tour, beginning on September 8, 2016. Soy Tour, which is the follow-up of Espósito's previous A Bailar Tour, included dates across Latin America, Europe and Israel.

Before and while touring, the singer embarked on a promotional tour across various cities of Latin America, Italy, Puerto Rico, Spain, the United States. Espósito performed live several times across 2016, including performances at the 2016 Radio Disney Vivo music festival in Buenos Aires, the 2016 Coca-Cola.FM festival in Mexico City along with Mexican boy-band CD9, the 2016 Coca-Cola Music Experience On The Beach at El Campello, Spain in front of 30,000 people, and as the opening act of Fifth Harmony's The 7/27 Tour in Santiago.

The first leg of the tour visited twenty-one cities across South America beginning on September 8, 2016 in Buenos Aires, Argentina and concluding on December 6, 2016 in Montevideo, Uruguay. In November 2016, Espósito performed as the opening act for Ricky Martin's One World Tour at the Monterrey Arena in Monterrey, the Telmex Auditorium in Guadalajara and the National Auditorium in Mexico City. Days after, the singer travelled to Italy, where she gave away two showcases or "fan events" at the RDS Auditorium in Rome and 55 Milano in Milan.

The second leg of the tour consisted of a series of performances in festivals, including the one of February 25, 2017 at the 58th Viña del Mar International Song Festival in Viña del Mar, Chile. This leg of the tour visited eight cities, starting on January 10, 2017 in Punta del Este, Uruguay, and concluding on March 10, 2017 in Dolores, Argentina.

The European leg of the tour was announced on December 20, 2016, which started on April 4, 2017 in Madrid, Spain and concluded on April 13, 2017 in Tel Aviv, Israel. This leg of the tour was promoted by Live Nation, Sold Out and Yair Dori. On March 30, 2017, Espósito confirmed the continuity of the South American leg of the tour, which started on April 29, 2017 in Colón, Argentina, and finished on June 17, 2017 in Santiago, Chile.

== Production ==
The big screen is described as the protagonist of the show from the very beginning. There, different types of images are projected and it carries the audience to a virtual tour for absolutely all the songs. In the videos, close-ups of Espósito predominate, especially to her mouth and eyes, but also her getting ready for the show, graffitis, song lyrics and even her excited fans to tears and jumping for joy during old shows of the teen-idol.

The show's production also includes different light sets to create different atmospheres in each act, every color laserlights, projections over the audience, special effects, confetti, a floating luminous sphere and a DJ booth, and ten different costumes.

== Concert synopsis ==
The show begins with a video introduction of the singer. Immediately, the screens splits with Espósito landing on stage in a luminous sphere while performing the first chords of the opening number, "Soy". She then continues with the popular tracks, "Irresistible" and "Asesina". It is here that she not only sings but she also plays the guitar and shows her rockier side. After a music interlude, and accompanied by her entourage, 8 musicians and 10 dancers, the show continues with "Boomerang" and "Tu Revolución" and leaves the stage. Espósito comes back to the stage to perform a medley of ballads from her previous record A Bailar which includes "Del Otro Lado", "Cielo Salvador" and "Desamor". The ballad act continues as the singer performs "Cree en Mí", creating an intimate atmosphere dominated by red and yellow lights, in which Espósito deploys all her glamor wearing a long dress, with transparencies and brightnesses.

The next songs to be performed are "Bomba", in which twerking predominates as dance style, and "Mi Religión", while Espósito descends from the ceiling by commanding a DJ console surrounded by lights, smoke and special effects, which is described as "a 100% energetic moment that brings everyone to their feet for a party-like atmosphere". To accompany the song "Lejos de Mí", Espósito brings together in a video to several of her friends, included the actresses Leticia Siciliani, María del Cerro, Marina Bellati and Justina Bustos. The heat slows down as Espósito performs "Reina", "Ego" and "Amor Es Presente", in the last one accompanied by a gospel choir.

Towards the end of the show, Espósito once again comes back to the stage wearing a pink leather crop top, skirt and boots to perform "Unico", "A Bailar" and "Mil Años Luz". The last act includes the songs "No Estoy Sola", "Histeria" and "Ring Na Na". Espósito ends the show thanking the public while confetti falls from the ceiling.

== Commercial performance ==
On September 1, 2016, a week before the start of the tour, it was announced that the first four shows at the Opera Allianz Theatre were all sold out, making it the third highest-grossing tour of the week in Buenos Aires. Other sold out dates included the shows in La Plata, Santiago del Estero, Montevideo, Punta del Este and Viña del Mar. However, the ticket sales for the shows in Mendoza, La Rioja and Toay were not as successful as the mentioned before. As of March 2017, it is estimated that 380,000 have attended the tour.

== Setlist ==
This set list is representative of the show on October 27, 2016 in La Plata, Argentina. It is not representative of all concerts for the duration of the tour.

1. "Soy"
2. "Irresistible"
3. "Asesina"
4. "Del Otro Lado"
5. "Cree en Mí"
6. "Boomerang"
7. "Tu Revolución"
8. "Bomba"
9. "Mi Religión"
10. "Lejos de Mí"
11. "Reina"
12. "Ego"
13. "Amor Es Presente"
14. "Unico"
15. "A Bailar"
16. "Mil Años Luz"
17. "No Estoy Sola"
18. "Histeria"
19. "Ring Na Na"
Notes
- During the shows in Buenos Aires of 2016, Espósito performed "Desamor" and "Cielo Salvador".
- During the shows in Milan, Rome and Tel Aviv, Espósito performed "Roma-Bangkok". In the show of Milan, the singer was joined onstage by Baby K to perform the song.
- During the show of December 1, 2016 in Santiago, Espósito was joined onstage by Abraham Mateo during his opening set to perform "Mueve".

== Shows ==
List of concerts, showing date, city, country, venue, opening acts, tickets sold, number of available tickets and amount of gross revenue
Date	City	Country	Venue	Opening acts
South America
September 8, 2016	Buenos Aires	Argentina	Opera Allianz Theatre	—N/a
September 9, 2016	Buenos Aires	Argentina	Opera Allianz Theatre	—N/a
September 10, 2016	Buenos Aires	Argentina	Opera Allianz Theatre	—N/a
September 11, 2016	Buenos Aires	Argentina	Opera Allianz Theatre	—N/a
October 1, 2016	Santa Fe	Argentina	Teatro ATE Casa España	—N/a
October 6, 2016	Rosario	Argentina	Metropolitano	—N/a
October 7, 2016	Tandil	Argentina	Estadio Unión & Progreso	—N/a
October 8, 2016	Mar del Plata	Argentina	Estadio Islas Malvinas	—N/a
October 14, 2016	San Juan	Argentina	Estadio Aldo Cantoni	—N/a
October 15, 2016	Mendoza	Argentina	Sancor Seguros Arena	—N/a
October 16, 2016	La Rioja	Argentina	Superdomo	Adrián Guaraglia
October 21, 2016	Venado Tuerto	Argentina	Estadio Olimpia	—N/a
October 22, 2016	Córdoba	Argentina	Orfeo Superdomo	Future Ted
October 25, 2016	La Plata	Argentina	Teatro Argentino	—N/a
October 28, 2016	Bahía Blanca	Argentina	Club Estudiantes	—N/a
October 29, 2016	Toay	Argentina	Complejo Horacio del Campo	—N/a
November 4, 2016	Santiago del Estero	Argentina	Club Ciclista Olímpico	—N/a
November 11, 2016	Canning	Argentina	Las Toscas Shopping	Gustavo Cejas
November 12, 2016	Asunción	Paraguay	Conmebol Convention Center	Acho Laterza
December 1, 2016	Santiago	Chile	Teatro Caupolicán	Abraham Mateo
December 3, 2016 (Note: The concert of December 3, 2016 in San Nicolás de los Arroyos was part of the Ternium-Siderar Mega Fiesta.)	San Nicolás	Argentina	Ternium Siderar	—N/a
December 6, 2016	Montevideo	Uruguay	Teatro de Verano	Victoria Solé
January 10, 2017	Punta del Este	Uruguay	Conrad Resort & Casino	—N/a
January 18, 2017 (Note: The concert of January 18, 2017 in Mar del Plata was a free show.)	Mar del Plata	Argentina	Paseo Hermitage	—N/a
January 21, 2017 (Note: The concert of January 21, 2017 in Pinamar was part of the Pinamar Summer Music Festival.)	Pinamar	Argentina	Auditorio Playa	Valen Etchegoyen
January 23, 2017 (Note: The concert of January 23, 2017 in Buenos Aires was an exclusive show for Claro customers.)	Buenos Aires	Argentina	La Trastienda Club	—N/a
February 5, 2017 (Note: The concerts of Caseros, Colón, Coronel Pringles and Saladillo were part of the 2017 Acercarte Festival: a series of free events organized by the government of Buenos Aires Province.)	Caseros	Argentina	Cedem 1	—N/a
February 25, 2017 (Note: The concert of February 25, 2017 in Viña del Mar was part of the LVIII Viña del Mar International Song Festival.)	Viña del Mar	Chile	Quinta Vergara Amphitheater	—N/a
March 4, 2017 (Note: The concert of March 4, 2017 in Tigre was a free show organized by the government of Tigre Partido.)	Tigre	Argentina	Estación Tigre	Sin Ensayo
March 10, 2017 (Note: The concert of March 10, 2017 in Dolores was part of the 2017 Fiesta Nacional de La Guitarra.)	Dolores	Argentina	Predio FNG	—N/a
Europe
April 4, 2017	Madrid	Spain	Teatro Nuevo Apolo	—N/a
April 6, 2017	Barcelona	Spain	Barcelona Arts	—N/a
April 9, 2017	Milan	Italy	Magazzini Generali	—N/a
April 10, 2017	Rome	Italy	Orion	—N/a
Asia
April 13, 2017	Tel Aviv	Israel	Menora Mivtachim Arena	Noa Kirel
South America
April 29, 2017	Colón	Argentina	Plaza San Martín	—N/a
May 2, 2017	Puerto Madryn	Argentina	Gimnasio Guillermo Brown	—N/a
May 4, 2017	Neuquén	Argentina	Rainbow at Casino Magic	—N/a
May 6, 2017	Coronel Pringles	Argentina	Plazoleta Eva Perón	—N/a
May 12, 2017	Tucumán	Argentina	Teatro Mercedes Sosa	—N/a
May 13, 2017	Salta	Argentina	Teatro Provincial	—N/a
May 19, 2017	Posadas	Argentina	Club Tokio	—N/a
May 20, 2017	Corrientes	Argentina	Club Regatas	—N/a
May 28, 2017	Saladillo	Argentina	Plaza 25 de Mayo	—N/a
June 17, 2017	Santiago	Chile	Teatro Teletón	Vesta Lugg

== Box office score data ==
Date	City	Country	Venue	Attendance	Revenue
June 17, 2017	Santiago	Chile	Teatro Teletón	793 / 960	$45,967

== Cancelled and rescheduled shows ==
List of cancelled or rescheduled concerts, showing date, city, country, venue and reason for cancellation
Date	City	Country	Venue	Reason/Additional Info
November 5, 2016	Catamarca	Argentina	Predio Ferial	Unknown.
December 10, 2016	Guayaquil	Ecuador	Coliseo Voltaire Paladines Polo	Rescheduled for February 10, 2017 at Guayaquil Convention Center due to "technical order issues", and finally cancelled due to "logistical issues".
December 12, 2016	Buenos Aires	Argentina	Teatro Metropolitan Citi	Rescheduled for January 23, 2017 due to a burn in the singer's metatarsal. However, Espósito gave away a short acoustic show on the original date.
May 1, 2017	Comodoro Rivadavia	Argentina	Teatro Maria Auxiliadora	City affected by the 2017 Argentina floods.

=== Changes of venue ===
List of changes of venue, showing date, city, country, former venue, new venue and reason
Date	City	Country	Former venue	New venue	Reason/Additional Info
October 7, 2016	Tandil	Argentina	Anfiteatro Martín Fierro	Estadio Unión & Progreso	Unknown.
April 9, 2017	Milan	Italy	Fabrique	Magazzini Generali	"Organizational issues".
June 16, 2017	Santiago	Chile	Teatro Caupolicán	Teatro Teletón	Unknown
