= Brava Tour =

2018–19 concert tour by Lali

- Tour by Lali
- Associated album: Brava
- Start date: August 23, 2018
- End date: November 7, 2019
- Legs: 3
- No. of shows: 27 in Latin America; 5 in North America; 2 in Europe; 1 in Asia; 35 in total

Lali concert chronology
- Lali en Vivo (2017–18); Brava Tour (2018–19); Disciplina Tour (2022–23)

The Brava Tour was the fourth headlining concert tour by Argentine singer Lali, in support of her third studio album, Brava (2018). The tour began on August 23, 2018, in Buenos Aires and concluded on November 7, 2019, in Washington, D.C.

Throughout October and November, 2018, Lali uploaded a series of performances of a show at the Luna Park Arena to YouTube. The Brava Tour was included on Rolling Stone's best shows of 2018 list.

== Background ==
Following the release of her single "100 Grados", In April 2018 Lali announced that she was going to tour later that year. While still touring with her Lali en Vivo, a second date at the Luna Park Arena had to be added due to high demand. Argentine, Uruguayan and Chilean dates were announced in the following weeks.

On August 23, 2019, Lali announced the American tour dates, including stops at San Antonio, New York City, Nashville, Chicago, Washington, D.C. and Miami. Even though Lali performed in Miami with her Lali en Vivo tour in 2018, this is the first time that she got to tour in multiple cities of the United States.

== Concert synopsis ==
The show begins when a video introduction is displayed on the huge vertical LED screen. The stage simulates to be a garden of eight meters high and sixteen meters wide, surrounded by gigantic roses and lips, representing the aesthetics of the album. After the phrase "Soy brava, babies" (English: "I'm fierce, babies") is heard, Lali appears onstage wearing a golden sequin bodysuit and a fringed jacket to perform "OMG!". The first set also includes "A Bailar", "Histeria", "Irresistible" and "Soy". Lali changes her clothes to perform "Besarte Mucho", accompanied by a sexy choreography. Then, she performs "Somos Amantes", while images of her legs and her body are seen on the main screen. Previous to "Salvaje", she performs a sexy solo dance number on top of rotating platform. After "Sin Querer Queriendo", Lali performs dance remixes of "Boomerang", "Mil Años Luz", "Mi Religión" and "Asesina", and leaves the stage.

The party mood slows down as Lali reappears onstage wearing a long dress and accompanied by a piano to perform "Reina", "Unico" and "Vuelve a Mi". Lali's back up dancers perform a dance interlude while their names appears on the screen. Once again, Lali comes back to the stage to perform "100 Grados". For "Tu Revolución", the lights of the arena turn green as a symbol of the pro-legal abortion movement in Argentina. As Lali performs "Bomba" and "Caliente", the mood rises again. Following "Mi Última Canción" and "Una Na", Lali appears onstage wearing a long-champagne color dress to perform an acoustic set of her ballads "Tu Sonrisa", "Cielo Salvador", "Cree en Mí" and "Del Otro Lado". When the show seems to have finished, Lali returns once again to perform "Ego", "No Estoy Sola" and "Amor Es Presente", wearing pink top and skirt. After two and a half hours, and having performed thirty-one songs, Lali performs "Tu Novia" while confetti rains from the ceiling. She disappears from the stage from the last time, and the big screen displays the word "Brava", indicating that the show has finished.

== Controversy ==
Since Lali proclaimed herself in favor of the voluntary termination of pregnancy in Argentina, where abortion was still illegal at the time, she received negative backlash from the "pro-life" movement. During her Brava Tour, she dedicated her song "Tu Revolución" to the legalization of abortion movement, while the stage lights turned green and green hearts, the color of the pro-choice movement in Argentina, were displayed in the screens. For this reason, the singer had to face anti-abortion resistance in certain cities during the tour. For the show of October 5, 2018 in Salta, a group of people planned to gather outside the venue where Lali was playing to protest against her. However, the number of people gathered was about ten and Lali performed without any problem. For the show of October 27, 2018 in Corrientes, Lali was banned from performing in the city after repeated calls from the pro-life movement to protest and repudiate her show. Even though the singer reportedly received death threats, her team stated that the show was cancelled on "reasons other than the artist's and local production's." For the show of February 11, 2019, in Neuquén, a pro-life party made a petition through Change.org in which they asked the city's mayor to "review [Lali's visit to the city] as it could be incurring in an indirect promotion of the legalization of abortion." On the other hand, Actrices Argentinas, a Feminist group of Argentine actresses of which Lali is part of, called for everyone to attend the show and lift up their green scarves, which are a sign of the pro-legal abortion movement in Argentina. Despite every attempt to cancel her show, Lali performed without any problem for an audience of 160 thousand people. The situation repeated again in Cipolletti, Río Negro, where pro-life people tried to boycott the show.

== Set list ==
This set list is representative of the show on August 23, 2018, in Buenos Aires, Argentina.

1. "OMG!"
2. "A Bailar"
3. "Histeria"
4. "Irresistible"
5. "Soy"
6. "Besarte Mucho"
7. "Somos Amantes"
8. "Salvaje"
9. "Sin Querer Queriendo"
10. "Mi Mala (Remix)"
11. "Boomerang" (interlude with elements of "Mi Religión", "Mil Años Luz" and "Asesina")
12. "Mi Religión"
13. "Mil Años Luz"
14. "Asesina" (remix)
15. "Reina"
16. "Unico"
17. "Vuelve a Mi"
18. "100 Grados"
19. "Tu Revolución"
20. "Bomba"
21. "Caliente"
22. "Mi Última Canción"
23. "Una Na"
24. "Tu Sonrisa"
25. "Cielo Salvador"
26. "Cree en Mí"
27. "Del Otro Lado"
28. "Ego"
29. "No Estoy Sola"
30. "Amor Es Presente"
31. "Tu Novia"
Notes
- During the first show in Buenos Aires, Lali was joined onstage by Abraham Mateo to perform "Salvaje".
- During the shows in Buenos Aires, Lali was joined onstage by Mau y Ricky to perform "Sin Querer Queriendo" and "Mi Mala (Remix)".
- During the shows in Buenos Aires, Lali was joined onstage by Pabllo Vittar to perform "Caliente". Vittar also performed "Problema Seu" alone.
- Starting with the show at Lollapalooza Argentina, "Lindo Pero Bruto" was added to the set list.
- Starting with the show at San Antonio, Texas, "Laligera" was added to the set list.

== Shows ==
List of concerts, showing date, city, country, and venue
Date	City	Country	Venue
South America
August 23, 2018	Buenos Aires	Argentina	Luna Park
August 24, 2018	Buenos Aires	Argentina	Luna Park
August 31, 2018	Córdoba	Argentina	Quality Espacio
September 1, 2018	Rosario	Argentina	Teatro El Círculo
September 8, 2018	Santa Fe	Argentina	Teatro ATE Casa España
September 9, 2018	Rafaela	Argentina	Teatro Manuel Belgrano
September 13, 2018	San Juan	Argentina	Teatro Sarmiento
September 15, 2018	Mendoza	Argentina	Teatro Plaza
September 30, 2018 (Note: The concert of September 30, 2018 in Hurlingham was part of the Acercarte Festival.)	Hurlingham	Argentina	Predio Municipalidad
October 5, 2018	Salta	Argentina	Teatro Provincial
October 6, 2018	Tucumán	Argentina	Teatro Mercedes Sosa
October 13, 2018	Mar del Plata	Argentina	Teatro Radio City
October 19, 2018	Santiago	Chile	Teatro Teletón
November 17, 2018	Montevideo	Uruguay	Teatro de Verano
November 25, 2018 (Note: The concert of November 25, 2018 in La Plata was part of the festivities for the 136th anniversary of the city.)	La Plata	Argentina	Plaza Moreno
December 16, 2018 (Note: The concert of December 16, 2018 in Río Gallegos was part of the Rio Gallegos Festival.)	Río Gallegos	Argentina	Polideportivo Boxing Club
January 10, 2019 (Note: The concert of January 10, 2019 in Los Antiguos was part of the 30th Fiesta Nacional de la Cereza.)	Los Antiguos	Argentina	General Carrera Lake
January 14, 2019 (Note: The concert of January 14, 2019 in Mar del Plata was part of the AcercArte festival.)	Mar del Plata	Argentina	Parque Camet
January 17, 2019 (Note: The concert of January 17, 2019 in Pinamar was part of the AcercArte festival.)	Pinamar	Argentina	Auditorio Playa
January 26, 2019 (Note: The concert of January 26, 2019 in Andalgalá was part of 43rd Fuerte de Andagalá Festival.)	Andalgalá	Argentina	Predio del Festival
January 27, 2019 (Note: The concert of January 27, 2019 in Albardón was part of Fiesta de Albardón.)	Albardón	Argentina	Parque Latinoamericano
February 6, 2019	Mar del Plata	Argentina	Teatro Radio City
February 11, 2019 (Note: The concert of February 10, 2019 in Neuquén was part of Fiesta de la Confluencia.)	Neuquén	Argentina	Paseo de la Costa
March 9, 2019 (Note: The concert of March 9, 2019 in Cipolletti was part of Fiesta de la Actividad Física.)	Cipolletti	Argentina	Predio del Festival
March 31, 2019 (Note: The concert of March 31, 2019 in Buenos Aires was part of Lollapalooza Argentina.)	Buenos Aires	Argentina	Hipódromo de San Isidro
April 20, 2019 (Note: The concert of April 20, 2019 in Ingeniero White was part of the 30th Annual Fiesta Nacional del Camarón y el Langostino.)	Ingeniero White	Argentina	Ingeniero White Port
Asia
September 18, 2019	Tel Aviv	Israel	Heichal HaTarbut
Europe
September 20, 2019	Barcelona	Spain	Sala Bikini
September 21, 2019	Madrid	Spain	Cool Stage
South America
September 29, 2019 (Note: The concert of September 29, 2019 in Rio de Janeiro was part of Rock in Rio festival.)	Rio de Janeiro	Brazil	Barra Olympic Park
North America
October 26, 2019 (Note: The concert of October 26, 2019 in San Antonio was part of the Mala Luna Music Festival.)	San Antonio	United States	Wolff Stadium Parking Lot
October 30, 2019	New York City	United States	Le Poisson Rouge
November 1, 2019	Nashville	United States	The Cowan
November 3, 2019	Chicago	United States	Mansion Nightclub
November 7, 2019	Washington, D.C.	United States	Howard Theatre

== Cancelled shows ==
List of cancelled concerts, showing date, city, country, venue and reason for cancellation
Date	City	Country	Venue	Reason
October 27, 2018	Corrientes	Argentina	Estadio José Conte	Lali was banned by local authorities due to her position of support of the voluntary termination of pregnancy law in Argentina
November 10, 2019 (Note: The concert of November 10, 2019 in Miami Beach was going to be part of the Miami Beach Pop Festival.)	Miami	United States	South Beach	Festival cancelled due to "unforeseen circumstances"
