= Lali en Vivo =

2017–18 concert tour by Lali Espósito

- Tour by Lali
- Associated album: Soy
- Start date: November 3, 2017
- End date: July 28, 2018
- Legs: 2
- No. of shows: 11 in Latin America; 4 in Europe; 3 in North America; 1 in Asia; 18 in total

Lali concert chronology
- Soy Tour (2016–17); Lali en Vivo (2017–18); Brava Tour (2018–19)

Lali en Vivo was a headlining concert tour by Argentine singer Lali Espósito. It was Espósito's third headlining tour, and the second one in support of her second studio album, Soy (2016). The tour began on November 3, 2017, in Buenos Aires, and concluded on July 28, 2018, in Barcelona.

== Background ==
On July 24, 2017, Espósito first announced that she was going on tour later that year with a brand new show. The show was supposed to be the continuation of her Soy Tour, but the singer told Billboard that, because of all the changes she had made, she had to rename it to "Lali en Vivo". In an interview with Infobae, Espósito said "Lali en Vivo will be the biggest thing (at the technical level) that I have ever done so far. It will have an impressive staging (lights, screens, stage), a lot of dancers and special guests." Tickets for the show of November 3, 2017 at the Luna Park Arena sold out in less than four days, resulting in a second date on November 10 at the same place.

== Concert synopsis ==
The show begins with a video of Lali getting ready for the show. Espósito appears from behind a screen that splits in two, performing "Mi Religión" in a black bodysuit and thigh-high pointed boots, followed by "Te Siento" and "Unico". Before performing "Boomerang", an interlude that features images from its music video is played. Wearing a golden crop top and an oversized jean jacket with golden chains, the singer then performs "Tu Revolución". After making everyone dance, the lights go down and Lali appears wearing embroidered-golden Palazzo trousers, and a crop top and a coat of the same color to perform an intimate medley of ballads, including "Del Otro Lado", "Cielo Salvador", "Desamor" and "Cree en Mí".

For the next segment of the show, the heat returns while Lali performs "Soy" in a colorful-metallic bodysuit. Accompanied by all-female dancers dressed the same way, the singer sings "Una Na" and "Bomba". Then, she appears in a short red dress and performs "Lejos de Mí", "Ego", "Reina" and "Amor es Presente". Towards the end of the show, Lali returns to the stage in a white one-pice suit with chains to perform some of her danceable hits like "Mil Años Luz", Irresistible and "A Bailar".

The singer begins the last segment of the show singing two songs from her upcoming studio album. For "Tu Novia", she is accompanied by her dancers to perform a hot choreography, while for "Tu Sonrisa", she plays the harmonica and is accompanied by her band. Espósito closes off the show performing "No Estoy Sola" while confetti rains down and she disappears from the stage.

== Setlist ==
This set list is representative of the show on November 3, 2017 in Buenos Aires, Argentina. It is not representative of all concerts for the duration of the tour.

1. "Mi Religión"
2. "Te Siento"
3. "Unico"
4. "Boomerang"
5. "Tu Revolución"
6. "Del Otro Lado" / "Cielo Salvador" / "Desamor"
7. "Cree en Mí"
8. "Soy"
9. "Histeria"
10. "Una Na"
11. "Bomba"
12. "Lejos de Mí"
13. "Ego"
14. "Reina"
15. "Mueve"
16. "Amor Es Presente"
17. "Mil Años Luz"
18. "Irresistible"
19. "A Bailar"
20. "Roma-Bangkok"
21. "Asesina"
22. "Tu Sonrisa"
23. "Tu Novia"
24. "No Estoy Sola"
Notes
- "100 Grados" was added to the set list beginning with the show of April 14, 2018 in Chascomús.
- "Besarte Mucho" was added to the set list beginning with the show of July 13, 2018 in Miami, Florida.
Special guests

Espósito performed duets with musical guests on some dates of the tour

- Abraham Mateo – November 3 and 10, 2017: "Mueve".
- Mis Bolivia – November 3 and 10, 2017: "Tu Revolución" and "Tomate El Palo" with Leo García.
- Nahuel Pennisi – November 3, 2017: "Cree en Mí" and "Princesa".
- Abel Pintos – November 10, 2017: "Ego" and "Oncemil".
- Miranda! – November 10, 2017: "Irresistible".
- A.N.I.M.A.L. – November 10, 2017: "Asesina".
- Mau y Ricky – July 13, 2018: "Mi Mala (Remix)".

== Shows ==
List of concerts, showing date, city, country and venue
Date	City	Country	Venue
South America
November 3, 2017	Buenos Aires	Argentina	Luna Park
November 10, 2017	Buenos Aires	Argentina	Luna Park
November 18, 2017	Rosario	Argentina	Teatro El Círculo
November 24, 2017	Córdoba	Argentina	Quality Espacio
December 9, 2017 (Note: The November 9, 2017 concert in Catriel was part of the 2017 Fiesta del Petróleo.)	Catriel	Argentina	Predio Acceso Sur
December 15, 2017 (Note: The November 15, 2017 concert in San Juan was part of the Fiesta Nacional de Santa Lucía.)	San Juan	Argentina	Plaza Santa Lucía
January 14, 2018 (Note: The January 14, 2018 concert in Federación was part of the 34th Fiesta Nacional del Lago.)	Federación	Argentina	Anfiteatro Juancho Garcilazo
January 19, 2018 (Note: The January 19, 2018 concert in Mar del Plata was part of the 2018 Festival de la Canción Popular.)	Mar del Plata	Argentina	Punta Mogotes
April 14, 2018 (Note: The April 14, 2018 concert in Chascomús was part of the 2018 Acercarte Festival: a series of free events organized by the government of Buenos Aires Province.)	Chascomús	Argentina	Parque de los Libres del Sur
May 11, 2018 (Note: The May 11, 2018 concert in General Alvear was part of the 2018 Fiesta de la Ganadería.)	General Alvear	Argentina	Predio Ferial
May 24, 2018 (Note: The May 24, 2018 concert in Lima was part of the Radio Disney Vivo music festival.)	Lima	Peru	Jockey Club del Perú
North America
July 12, 2018 (Note: The July 12, 2018 concert in Mexico City was part of the Evento Oye 16 Años.)	Mexico City	Mexico	Pepsi Center
July 13, 2018	Miami	United States	Flamingo Theater
July 15, 2018 (Note: The July 15, 2018 concert in Orlando was part of FunTime Fest.)	Orlando	United States	Hard Rock Live
Europe & Asia
July 21, 2018 (Note: The June 21 and 22, 2018 concerts in Milan were part of the 2018 Milano Latin Festival.)	Milan	Italy	Assago Milanofiori Forum
July 22, 2018	Milan	Italy	Assago Milanofiori Forum
July 24, 2018	Tel Aviv	Israel	Heichal HaTarbut
July 27, 2018	Madrid	Spain	La Riviera
July 28, 2018	Barcelona	Spain	Razzmatazz
