= A Bailar Tour =

2014–16 concert tour by Lali

- Tour by Lali
- Associated album: A Bailar
- Start date: April 19, 2014
- End date: April 25, 2016
- Legs: 5
- No. of shows: 70 in South America; 2 in Europe; 2 in Asia; 74 in total

Lali concert chronology
- A Bailar Tour (2014–16); Soy Tour (2016–17)

The A Bailar Tour was the first headlining concert tour by Argentine singer Lali in support of her debut studio album, A Bailar (2014). The tour began on April 19, 2014, in Buenos Aires and concluded in on April 25, 2016, Tel Aviv. It was the highest-grossing tour of 2015 in Argentina.

== Background ==
On September 2, 2013, Espósito had launched her solo career in a show at La Trastienda. The same night, she performed "A Bailar", "Asesina" and "Del Otro Lado". On March 15, 2014, a few days before the album release, Espósito performed "A Bailar" at the Caserta Festival in Italy.

The first leg of the tour included shows in Argentina, Uruguay, Spain and Italy. On November 27, Espósito performed as the opening act for a Ricky Martin's show at Ciudad del Rock, Buenos Aires in front of more than eighty thousand people. The five shows at the Opera Allianz Theater grossed AR$ 2,500,000. The second leg of the tour consisted in five summer shows and performances in festivals.

The dates for the third leg of the tour were announced on March 4, 2015, via Espósito's official Twitter account. Most of the dates included cities that had been previously visited in the first leg. Because of the high ticket demand for the shows in Rosario and Salta, a second date in each city was added.

The fourth and last leg of the tour included dates in Argentina, Uruguay, Chile and Israel. On October 3, 2015, Espósito performed as the opening act for Katy Perry's The Prismatic World Tour show at Hipódromo de Palermo in Buenos Aires. This leg of the tour included two sold out dates at the Luna Park Arena in Buenos Aires and two at the Menora Mivtachim Arena in Tel Aviv.

== Set lists ==
April — May 2014
1. "Asesina"
2. "Te Siento"
3. "Histeria"
4. "Desamor"
5. "Cielo Salvador"
6. "Del Otro Lado"
7. "Being"
8. "Just a Girl" (No Doubt cover)
9. "Wake Me Up" (Avicii cover)
10. "Mil Años Luz"
11. "No Estoy Sola"
12. "A Bailar"
13. "Hay Un Lugar" / "Me Voy" / "Escaparé"
14. "Asesina" (bis)
July — October 18, 2014
1. "Asesina"
2. "Te Siento"
3. "Histeria"
4. "Desamor"
5. "Cielo Salvador"
6. "Del Otro Lado"
7. "Being"
8. "Diamonds" (Rihanna cover)
9. "Wake Me Up" (Avicii cover)
10. "Mil Años Luz"
11. "No Estoy Sola"
12. "A Bailar"
13. "Hay Un Lugar" / "Me Voy" / "Escaparé"
14. "Asesina" (bis)
October 24, 2014 — February 2015
1. "Asesina"
2. "Te Siento"
3. "Histeria"
4. "Desamor"
5. "Cielo Salvador"
6. "Del Otro Lado"
7. "Being"
8. "Diamonds" (Rihanna cover)
9. "Wake Me Up" (Avicii cover)
10. "Don't Stop Me Now" (Queen cover)
11. "Mil Años Luz"
12. "No Estoy Sola"
13. "A Bailar"
14. "Hay Un Lugar" / "Me Voy" / "Escaparé"
15. "Amor de Verdad"
16. "Asesina" (bis)
May 2015 — March 12, 2016
1. "Asesina"
2. "Te Siento"
3. "Histeria"
4. "Desamor"
5. "Cielo Salvador"
6. "Del Otro Lado"
7. "Being"
8. "Diamonds" (Rihanna cover)
9. "Wake Me Up" (Avicii cover)
10. "Don't Stop Me Now" (Queen cover)
11. "Mil Años Luz"
12. "No Estoy Sola"
13. "A Bailar"
14. "Júrame"
15. "Amor de Verdad"
16. "Asesina" (bis)
March 18, 2016 — April 14, 2016
1. "Asesina"
2. "Te Siento"
3. "Histeria"
4. "Desamor"
5. "Cielo Salvador"
6. "Del Otro Lado"
7. "Being"
8. "Diamonds" (Rihanna cover)
9. "Lean On" (Major Lazer and DJ Snake cover)
10. "Don't Stop Me Now" (Queen cover)
11. "Mil Años Luz"
12. "No Estoy Sola"
13. "Júrame"
14. "Amor de Verdad"
15. "Unico"
16. "A Bailar"
Israel
1. "Asesina"
2. "Te Siento"
3. "Histeria"
4. "Desamor"
5. "Cielo Salvador"
6. "Del Otro Lado"
7. "Being"
8. "Diamonds" (Rihanna cover)
9. "Lean On" (Major Lazer and DJ Snake cover)
10. "Don't Stop Me Now" (Queen cover)
11. "Mil Años Luz"
12. "No Estoy Sola"
13. "Amor de Verdad"
14. "Unico"
15. "A Bailar"
16. "Júrame"
17. "Hay Un Lugar" / "Me Voy" / "Escaparé"
18. "Asesina" (bis)
Notes
- During the show in Buenos Aires on July 8, 2014, Espósito was joined onstage by Ale Sergi from Miranda! to permorm "Histeria".
- During the show in La Plata, Buenos Aires on September 29, 2015, Espósito performed "Miedo a Perderte" by Teen Angels.
- During the shows in Buenos Aires on November 26 and 27, 2014, and October 3, 2015, Espósito was joined onstage by Zetta Krome to permorm "Amor de Verdad".

== Shows ==
List of concerts, showing date, city, country, venue, opening acts, tickets sold, number of available tickets and amount of gross revenue
Date	City	Country	Venue	Opening acts	Attendance	Revenue
South America
April 19, 2014	Buenos Aires	Argentina	Teatro Opera Allianz	—N/a	5,000 / 5,000	$2,500,000
April 20, 2014	Buenos Aires	Argentina	Teatro Opera Allianz	—N/a	5,000 / 5,000	$2,500,000
May 3, 2014	Mar del Plata	Argentina	Radio City	—N/a	—N/a	—N/a
May 4, 2014	Olavarria	Argentina	Teatro Municipal	—N/a	500 / 500	—N/a
May 17, 2014	Bahía Blanca	Argentina	Teatro Don Bosco	—N/a	—N/a	—N/a
May 23, 2014	Rosario	Argentina	Auditorio Fundación Astengo	—N/a	—N/a	—N/a
May 24, 2014	Santa Fe	Argentina	Teatro ATE Casa España	—N/a	—N/a	—N/a
May 31, 2014	Córdoba	Argentina	Quality Espacio	—N/a	—N/a	—N/a
July 8, 2014	Buenos Aires	Argentina	Teatro Opera Allianz	—N/a	7,500 / 7,500	(Note: The boxscore data for July 8, 9 and 21, 2014 is combined with the April 19 and 20, 2014 data.)
July 9, 2014	Buenos Aires	Argentina	Teatro Opera Allianz	—N/a	7,500 / 7,500	(Note: The boxscore data for July 8, 9 and 21, 2014 is combined with the April 19 and 20, 2014 data.)
July 21, 2014	Buenos Aires	Argentina	Teatro Opera Allianz	—N/a	7,500 / 7,500	(Note: The boxscore data for July 8, 9 and 21, 2014 is combined with the April 19 and 20, 2014 data.)
August 29, 2014	La Plata	Argentina	Coliseo Podestá	—N/a	—N/a	—N/a
September 19, 2014 (Note: The shows of September 19, 2014 in La Plata was a free show launched by City of La Plata's government.)	La Plata	Argentina	Centro Cultural Dardo Rocha	—N/a	—N/a	—N/a
October 18, 2014	Montevideo	Uruguay	Teatro de Verano	—N/a	4,218 / 4,218	—N/a
October 24, 2014	Ituzaingó	Argentina	Teatro Gran Ituzaingó	—N/a	—N/a	—N/a
October 25, 2014	Avellaneda	Argentina	Teatro Colonial	—N/a	—N/a	—N/a
October 26, 2014 (Note: The October 26, 2014 concert in Buenos Aires was the opening act of Ricky Martin's show as part of the Coca-Cola in Concert 2014.)	Buenos Aires	Argentina	Ciudad del Rock	—N/a	60,000 / 60,000	—N/a
November 26, 2014	Buenos Aires	Argentina	La Trastienda Club	—N/a	—N/a	—N/a
November 27, 2014	Buenos Aires	Argentina	La Trastienda Club	—N/a	—N/a	—N/a
November 30, 2014	Mendoza	Argentina	Auditorio Ángel Bustelo	—N/a	—N/a	—N/a
December 1, 2014	San Juan	Argentina	Teatro Sarmiento	—N/a	—N/a	—N/a
December 4, 2014	Catamarca	Argentina	Cine Teatro Catamarca	—N/a	—N/a	—N/a
December 5, 2014 (Note: The December 5, 2014 show at Teatro 25 de Mayo in Santiago del Estero included a matinee and evening show.)	Santiago del Estero	Argentina	Teatro 25 de Mayo	—N/a	—N/a	—N/a
December 6, 2014	Tucumán	Argentina	Teatro Mercedes Sosa	—N/a	—N/a	—N/a
Europe
December 13, 2014	Madrid	Spain	Teatro Goya	—N/a	520 / 520	—N/a
December 15, 2014	Rome	Italy	Duepuntozero	—N/a	847 / 847	—N/a
South America
January 16, 2015 (Note: The January 16, 2015 concert in Buenos Aires was a free show as part of the "Buenos Aires Sunset Festival 2015")	Buenos Aires	Argentina	F. Alcorta y Pampa	—N/a	6,400 / 6,400	—N/a
January 20, 2015 (Note: The January 14, 2015 concert in Mar del Plata was a free show as launched by Buenos Aires Province's government)	Mar del Plata	Argentina	Divermar	Nahuel	60,000	—N/a
January 31, 2015 (Note: The January 31, 2015 concert in Rivadavia was a part of "Rivadavia Canta al País 2015".)	Rivadavia	Argentina	Centro de Deportes	—N/a	—N/a	—N/a
February 8, 2015 (Note: The February 8, 2015 concert in Villa María was a part of the "Festival Internacional de Peñas 2015".)	Villa María	Argentina	Anfiteatro Villa María	—N/a	—N/a	—N/a
February 14, 2015	Tigre	Argentina	Parque de la Costa	—N/a	—N/a	—N/a
May 1, 2015	Tucumán	Argentina	Teatro Mercedes Sosa	—N/a	1,594 / 1,594	—N/a
May 2, 2015	Santiago del Estero	Argentina	Centro de Convenciones	—N/a	2,115 / 2,115	—N/a
May 23, 2015	Rosario	Argentina	Teatro El Círculo	—N/a	2,900 / 2,900	—N/a
May 24, 2015	Rosario	Argentina	Teatro El Círculo	—N/a	2,900 / 2,900	—N/a
May 30, 2015	Córdoba	Argentina	Quality Espacio	—N/a	4,039 / 4,039	—N/a
June 6, 2015	Corrientes	Argentina	Club Regatas	—N/a	—N/a	—N/a
June 13, 2015	Neuquén	Argentina	Gimnasio Parque Central	—N/a	700 / 700	—N/a
June 20, 2015	Salta	Argentina	Teatro Provincial de Salta	—N/a	3,040 / 3,040	—N/a
June 21, 2015	Salta	Argentina	Teatro Provincial de Salta	—N/a	3,040 / 3,040	—N/a
August 23, 2015 (Note: The August 23, 2015 concert in Córdoba was a free show launched by Cadena3)	Córdoba	Argentina	Estadio Mario Alberto Kempes	—N/a	57,000 / 57,000	—N/a
September 19, 2015 (Note: The September 19 and 20, 2015 concerts in Villa Carlos Paz and Pilar were free shows as part of the spring festivities.)	Villa Carlos Paz	Argentina	Parque Asistencia del Rally	DJ Martín Huergo; Kawen	20,000	—N/a
September 20, 2015	Pilar	Argentina	Predio Piané	Adriel Montanari	20,000	—N/a
September 26, 2015 (Note: The September 26, 2015 concert in San Salvador de Jujuy was a free show as part of the "64th Fiesta Nacional de los Estudiantes de Jujuy")	San Salvador de Jujuy	Argentina	Estadio 23 de Agosto	—N/a	20,000	—N/a
October 3, 2015 (Note: The October 3, 2015 concert in Buenos Aires was the opening show of Katy Perry's "The Prismatic World Tour".)	Buenos Aires	Argentina	Hipódromo de Palermo	—N/a	17,623 / 17,623	$1,745,600
October 4, 2015	Totoras	Argentina	Unión Futbol Club	Cristian Amado	3,000	—N/a
October 24, 2015	Junín	Argentina	Complejo San Martín	—N/a	—N/a	—N/a
November 23, 2015	Buenos Aires	Argentina	La Trastienda Club	—N/a	600	—N/a
November 29, 2015 (Note: The November 29, 2015 concert in Olavarría was a free show as part of the 148th anniversary of the City.)	Olavarría	Argentina	Parque Helios Esverri	El Entrevero; Alta Gamma	100,000	—N/a
December 12, 2015	Montevideo	Uruguay	Teatro de Verano	Victoria Solé	4,218 / 4,218	—N/a
December 19, 2015 (Note: The shows of December 19 and 20, 2015 in Posadas and Puerto Iguazú were free shows as part of the "Gran Show de Fuegos Artificiales 2015".)	Posadas	Argentina	Costanera Kemerer	—N/a	—N/a	—N/a
December 20, 2015	Puerto Iguazú	Argentina	Costanera Eduardo Arrabal	—N/a	—N/a	—N/a
January 14, 2016 (Note: The January 14, 2016 concert in Mar del Plata was a free show launched by Sedal Argentina.)	Mar del Plata	Argentina	Mute beach	—N/a	60,000	—N/a
January 16, 2016	Punta del Este	Uruguay	Conrad Hotel & Casino	—N/a	1,500 / 1,500	—N/a
January 18, 2016 (Note: The January 18, 2016 concert in Jesús María was a part of the "51st Festival Nacional de Doma y Folklore de Jesús María".)	Jesús María	Argentina	Anfiteatro José Hernandez	—N/a	22,000	—N/a
January 21, 2016	San Francisco	Argentina	Superdomo San Francisco	—N/a	—N/a	—N/a
January 22, 2016 (Note: The January 22, 2016 concert in Villa del Rosario was a part of the "48th Festival Nacional de Folklore en el Agua".)	Villa del Rosario	Argentina	Anfiteatro Villa del Rosario	Francisco Efrén & Magui Rosales	—N/a	—N/a
January 31, 2016	Salta	Argentina	Delmi Arena	—N/a	3,000 / 4,070	—N/a
February 5, 2016 (Note: The February 5, 2016 concert in Villa María was a part of the "Festival Internacional de Peñas 2016".)	Villa María	Argentina	Anfiteatro Villa María	—N/a	12,000 / 12,000	—N/a
February 8, 2016 (Note: The February 8, 2016 concert in General Roca was a part of the "50th Fiesta de la Manzana".)	General Roca	Argentina	Predio Ferial	—N/a	90,000	—N/a
February 9, 2016 (Note: The February 9, 2016 concert in Lincoln was a part of the "Carnaval Lincoln 2016".)	Lincoln	Argentina	Hector Serazzi stage	Lisandro Marqués	—N/a	—N/a
February 12, 2016 (Note: The February 12, 2016 concert in Colón was a part of the "XXXI Fiesta Nacional de la Artesanía".)	Colón	Argentina	Parque Quirós	—N/a	—N/a	—N/a
February 13, 2016 (Note: The February 12, 2016 concert in Leones was a part of the "60th Fiesta Nacional del Trigo". However, the show couldn't be completed.)	Leones	Argentina	Club Leones	—N/a	—N/a	—N/a
February 14, 2016	Trenque Lauquen	Argentina	Club Barrio Alegre	—N/a	—N/a	—N/a
February 20, 2016	Comodoro Rivadavia	Argentina	Estadio Municipal	—N/a	20,000	—N/a
February 27, 2016	Punta del Este	Uruguay	Conrad Hotel & Casino	—N/a	1,000 / 1,500	—N/a
March 6, 2016	Tucumán	Argentina	Estadio Central Córdoba	—N/a	—N/a	—N/a
March 12, 2016	Paraná	Argentina	Club Echagüe	—N/a	—N/a	—N/a
March 18, 2016	Buenos Aires	Argentina	Luna Park	—N/a	18,580 / 18,580	—N/a
March 19, 2016	Buenos Aires	Argentina	Luna Park	—N/a	18,580 / 18,580	—N/a
April 14, 2016	Santiago	Chile	Teatro Nescafé de las Artes	—N/a	983 / 983	—N/a
Asia
April 24, 2016	Tel Aviv	Israel	Menora Mivtachim Arena	—N/a	14,024 / 14,024	—N/a
April 25, 2016	Tel Aviv	Israel	Menora Mivtachim Arena	—N/a	14,024 / 14,024	—N/a
Total					644,921 / 646,131 (99,8%)	—

== Cancelled and rescheduled shows ==
List of cancelled concerts, showing date, city, country, venue and reason for cancellation
Date	City	Country	Venue	Reason/Additional Info
October 8, 2014 (Note: The October 8, 2014 concert in Lima would be a part of the "Lady Fest 2014".)	Lima	Peru	Claro Convention Center	Festivals cancelled
November 7, 2014 (Note: The November 7, 2014 concert in Buenos Aires would be a part of the "Scream Fest Chile 2014".)	Buenos Aires	Argentina	Estadio Malvinas Argentinas	Festivals cancelled
November 22, 2014	Crespo	Argentina	Club Unión Crespo	Scheduling conflicts
November 23, 2014	Funes	Argentina	Plaza Don Bosco	Scheduling conflicts
January 19, 2015	Mar del Plata	Argentina	Divermar	Rescheduled for January 20, 2015 due to bad weather
November 14, 2015	Baradero	Argentina	Anfiteatro Pedro Carossi	Unknown
January 29, 2016	Tucumán	Argentina	Central Córdoba Arena	Rescheduled for January 30 and finally to March 6, 2016, due to bad weather
February 7, 2016	Lincoln	Argentina	Hector Serazzi stage	Rescheduled for February 9, 2016 due to bad weather

== Live broadcasts ==
Date	City	Channel / Website	Audience	Ref.
April 19, 2014	Buenos Aires	eltrecetv.com.ar	—	
January 20, 2015	Mar del Plata	cronica-tv.com.ar	—	—N/a
January 31, 2015	Rivadavia	América TV	—N/a	—N/a
February 8, 2015	Villa María	Canal 10 (Córdoba)	—N/a	
June 20, 2015	Salta	3musica.com	—	—N/a
September 19, 2015	Villa Carlos Paz	Canal CM	—N/a	—N/a
September 26, 2015	San Salvador de Jujuy	Canal 4 (Jujuy)	—N/a	—N/a
January 14, 2016	Mar del Plata	Sedal Argentina on YouTube	—	
January 18, 2016	Jesús María	TV Pública	2.4	
January 22, 2016	Villa del Rosario	TV Pública	1.6	
February 5, 2016	Villa María	TV Pública	2.8	
