= Ego (Lali song) =

Single by Lali

from the album Soy
- Released: December 14, 2016
- Recorded: 2016
- Length: 3:51
- Label: Sony Music Argentina; Sony Music Latin
- Composer(s): Gavin Jones; Tobias Lundgren; Johan Fransson; Tim Larsson
- Lyricist(s): Lali Espósito; Nano Novello; Pablo Akselrad; Luis Burgio
- Producer(s): Gavin Jones; Tobias Lundgren; Johan Fransson

Lali singles chronology
"Firestarter" (2016)	"Ego" (2016)	"Roma-Bangkok" (2017)

Music video
- "Ego" on YouTube

"Ego" is a song by Argentine singer Lali from her second studio album Soy (2016). The song was written by Tim Larsson and its producers Gavin Jones, Tobias Lundgren and Johan Fransson. Espósito co-wrote the Spanish version of the song with Gustavo Novello, Pablo Akselrad and Luis Burgio. The song was released as the album's third single and as Lali's debut single in the United States and Puerto Rico.

Commercially, the song peaked at number 4 on the Monitor Latino Argentine National Songs chart and at number 15 on the Argentine Latin Airplay chart. Its music video received the award for Video of the Year at the 2017 MTV Millennial Awards.

== Background and composition ==
"Ego" was originally written by Tim Larsson and its producers Gavin Jones, Tobias Lundgren and Johan Fransson. The Spanish version was in charge of Espósito, Gustavo Novello, Pablo Akselrad and Luis Burgio. In an interview with Billboard Argentina, the singer stated: "it means a lot to me to be able to talk about other people's ego and oneself's; how does that affect our way of living, how it turns into an attack".

== Release ==
The song was released as the album's third single, being first released to digital download on May 20, 2016 along with the release of the album, and later serviced to contemporary hit radio in December 2016. In March 2017, Lali travelled to San Juan, Puerto Rico and Miami, Florida in order to promote the single, which eventually became her debut single in those territories.

== Critical reception ==
While reviewing the album Soy, Santiago Torres from Billboard Argentina described the song as "a ballad with thoughtful, complex and orchestral arrangements" and also praised Espósito's "outstanding vocal performance". Belén Fourment from El País compared the song the previous promotional single "Unico", saying: "they are not directly compatible compositions, but both songs clearly reflect the life moments of a girl who still encourages to write from a more intimate place".

== Commercial performance ==
"Ego" debuted on the Monitor Latino Argentine songs chart at number 15 and later peaked at number 4. It marked Espósito's second entry and highest-charting song on the chart, after the previous top 5 single, "Soy". Additionally, the song peaked at number 15 on the Argentina Latin Airplay chart, also provided by Monitor Latino. On March 9, 2017, the song was the 50th more played song of the US Tropical Latin radio format.

== Music video ==
Directed by Juan Ripari, the music video made its premiere on December 14, 2016 at dawning on Vevo. The video broke the Argentine Vevo Record by achieving over 500 thousands views within a 24-hour span, and won an award at the 2017 MTV Millennial Awards in the category for Video of the Year.

=== Synopsis ===
The video was described as "an overcoming story". It was shot in Villa La Angostura, Argentina in early November. Espósito can be seen in a forest, running away from arrows that fall from the sky. However, towards the end of the video, she finds a bridge that carries her to some better place. In this way, the singer transforms the pain into learning, added to the metaphor of the change of clothes and the fact of crossing the bridge. The video ends with a message from Lali that says "Although the world agonizes for pride, greed and ego, there's always a bridge to where love, truth and light reign. Crossing it is for the brave sentimental only."

== Live performances ==
Espósito performed her first televised performance of "Ego" on Susana Giménez. On June 6, 2017, Espósito performed the song at the 19th Annual Gardel Awards, prior to "Boomerang" and "Soy". In Clarín.com, the performance was compared to previous ones by Madonna, Jennifer Lopez and Britney Spears, writing: "[Lali] surprised everyone with her outstanding figure, her live choreographies and her imprint at the moment of hitting one of the most important stages of the Corrientes Avenue. "Ego" is also part of the setlist for her worldwide tour, Soy Tour.

== Credits and personnel ==
Credits adapted from Soy's liner notes.

Recording and management

- Recorded at La Urraca, Tónica Estudios and 3música Estudios (Buenos Aires, Argentina)
- Mixed at Earcandy Studios (Orlando, Florida) and The Hit Factory Criteria (Miami, Florida)
- Published by Gavin Jones Music — administered by UMPG — Warner Chappell Scandinavia, 3musica, Warner/Chappell Publishing
- Mastered at Sterling Sound (New York City, New York)

Personnel

- Lali – lead vocals, songwriting
- Tim Larsson – songwriting, production, programming, percussion, engineering
- Johan Fransson – songwriting, production, strings, engineering
- Tobías Lundgren – songwriting, production, vocal editing, engineering
- Gavin Jones – songwriting, production
- Pablo Akselrad – songwriting
- Luis Burgio – songwriting
- Nano Novello – songwriting
- Antonella Giunta – background vocals
- Josefina Silveyra – background vocals
- Roberto "Tito" Vázquez – mixing engineering
- Chris Gehringer – mastering
- Javier Caso – A&R
- Pablo Durand – A&R director

== Charts ==
=== Weekly charts ===
Chart (2017)	Peak position
Argentina Latin (Monitor Latino)	15
Argentina National Songs (Monitor Latino)	4

=== Year-end charts ===
Chart (2017)	Position
Argentina (Monitor Latino)	91
Argentina Latin (Monitor Latino)	62
Panama Pop (Monitor Latino)	69
Venezuela (Monitor Latino)	49
Venezuela Pop (Monitor Latino)	7
