= A Bailar (Lali album) =

2014 studio album by Lali

Studio album by Lali
- Released: 21 March 2014
- Genres: dance-pop; electropop; hip-hop; Pop
- Length: 33:51
- Language: Spanish
- Labels: Self-released; Sony Argentina
- Producer: 3musica

Lali chronology
A Bailar (2014)	Soy (2016)

Singles from A Bailar
- 1. "A Bailar" Released: 12 August 2013; 2. "Asesina" Released: 10 March 2014; 3. "Mil Años Luz" Released: 19 November 2014; 4. "Del Otro Lado" Released: 7 January 2015; 5. "Histeria" Released: 11 September 2015

A Bailar is the debut studio album by Argentine singer Lali, released independently on 21 March 2014 and later re-released on 3 December 2014 by Sony Music Argentina as a special edition. The album was entirely produced by the team 3musica, formed by Pablo Akselrad, Luis Burgio and Gustavo Novello, and blends pop, dance and hip hop elements. Its standard edition contains ten tracks, including the singles "A Bailar", "Asesina", "Mil Años Luz", "Del Otro Lado", and "Histeria".

The record reached the number-one position in Argentina and was certified gold by the Argentine Chamber of Phonograms and Videograms Producers (CAPIF). It also won the Gardel Awards for Best Female Pop Album and Best New Pop Artist Album.

To support the album, Lali embarked on the A Bailar Tour, which consisted of more than 70 dates around Latin America, Europe, and Asia.

== Background and release ==
In 2013, while starring in the telenovela Solamente Vos, Lali announced her solo debut through a Twitcam and released "A Bailar" on 12 August 2013. The song marked the beginning of an independent project in which she took an active role as producer, making all the creative decisions.

Her first solo concert was held on 2 September 2013 at La Trastienda Club, presented in partnership with Coca-Cola and streamed online. There, she performed "A Bailar", "Asesina" and the ballad "Del Otro Lado". In the following months she released the latter two as promotional singles, with "Asesina" becoming the second official single on 10 March 2014.

The album was issued physically on 21 March 2014 and digitally on 25 March. In November 2014, Lali signed with Sony Music Argentina, who re-released the album as A Bailar (Versión Bonus) on 3 December, including two unreleased tracks and a DVD.

== Title and concept ==
The title A Bailar reflects the central concept of the album: music made for the dance floor, with a strong rhythmic base and a visual aesthetic tied to movement and energy. Lali conceived the project as an authentic personal statement, saying, "This project is me". From the start, she paid special attention to visuals, wardrobe and staging, with live shows featuring dancers, large screens and elaborate costume changes.

=== Music and lyrics ===
Musically, the album blends pop, dance and hip-hop. Lyrically, it ranges from celebration and fun to stories of heartbreak and empowerment.

== Reception ==
=== Critical reception ===
The album was well received by both audiences and the press, who praised its fresh approach to Argentine pop and its blend of genres less common among local artists. Critics highlighted Lali's stage energy and charisma, as well as her hands-on involvement in the production.

=== Commercial performance ===
The album peaked at number in Argentina, where it also received a gold certification by the Argentine Chamber of Phonograms and Videograms Producers. Furthermore, it peaked at number three in Uruguay and at number 15 in Israel.

== Promotion ==
To promote the album, Lali performed on television shows such as Susana Giménez and Showmatch, as well as in awards ceremonies such as the Gardel Awards and the Argentina Kids' Choice Awards.

The A Bailar Tour began on 19 April 2014 at Opera Theatre with two sold-out dates, later visiting cities across Argentina, Uruguay, Chile, Spain, Italy and Israel. The shows featured a live band, dancers, elaborate costumes and LED screens. In 2015, the tour's farewell leg once again sold-out venues in multiple Argentine provinces, ending with two sold-out shows at the Luna Park Arena in March 2016.

=== Singles ===
Lali released "A Bailar" as the album's lead single on 12 August 2013. The single, which is a dance track with strong hip hop influences, encouraging listeners to let go and enjoy, was met with success in Argentina and Latin America. In 2014, the song won in the category for Favorite Latin Song at the Kids' Choice Awards Argentina and for Best Female Music Video at the Quiero Awards.

"Asesina", which combines pop and hip hop, portraying a seductive, dominant woman, was released on 29 October 2013 as a promotional single of the album, and it was released on 10 March 2014 as the album's second single. The song won the Quiero Award for Best Choreography at the 2014 Quiero Awards.

In November 2014, Lali released "Mil Años Luz" the third single of A Bailar. The song incorporates electronic music elements and speaks about letting go of fears and emotional burdens. The song won in the category for Favorite Song at the 2015 Kids' Choice Awards Argentina.

"Del Otro Lado", a pop ballad about the end of a relationship, was released as the album's fourth single on 7 January 2015.

The fifth and final single from A Bailar, "Histeria", was released on 11 September 2015. The song mixes pop and electronic sounds to tell, with irony, the story of a relationship marked by ego and confusion.

=== Promotional singles ===
Before being released as official singles, "Del Otro Lado" and "Asesina" had been released as promotional singles in 2013. After Lali signed with Sony Music Argentina in November 2014, "Amor de Verdad" was released as a promotional single from the deluxe version of A Bailar.

== Awards ==
Year	Awards Ceremony	Award	Results
2014	Latin Music Italian Awards	Best Latin Female Album of the Year	Nominated
2015	Gardel Awards	Best Female Pop Album	Won
2015	Gardel Awards	Best New Pop Album	Won

== Track listing ==
All tracks are written by Mariana Espósito, Luis Burgio, Peter Akselrad, and Gustavo Novello, and produced by 3musica. Tracks 8 and 9 were also co-written by Antonella Giunta.

A Bailar – Standard edition
No.	Title	Length
1.	"Asesina"	3:30
2.	"Histeria"	3:30
3.	"Del Otro Lado"	3:41
4.	"A Bailar"	2:52
5.	"No Estoy Sola"	3:39
6.	"Te Siento"	3:39
7.	"Cielo Salvador"	3:17
8.	"Being"	3:19
9.	"Desamor"	3:20
10.	"Mil Años Luz"	3:44
Total length:		33:51

A Bailar — "?" edition (bonus track)
No.	Title	Length
11.	"Mil Años Luz" (live)	3:57
Total length:		37:48

A Bailar — "?" edition (bonus DVD)
No.	Title	Director	Length
1.	"Un Día de Show" (documentary)	Juan Ripari	9:54
2.	"Mil Años Luz" (live performance)	Juan Ripari	3:57
3.	"No Estoy Sola" (music video)	Juan Ripari	3:47
4.	"Asesina" (music video)	Juan Ripari	3:31
5.	"A Bailar" (music video)	Juan Ripari	4:10
Total length:			25:19

A Bailar — Digital Fanpack edition (bonus track)
No.	Title	Length
11.	"A Bailar" (Triplex remix)	4:14
Total length:		38:05

A Bailar — Fanpack edition (bonus tracks)
No.	Title	Length
11.	"Amor de Verdad" (featuring Zetta Krome)	3:56
12.	"A Bailar" (Triplex remix)	4:14
Total length:		42:01

A Bailar — Fanpack edition (bonus DVD)
No.	Title	Director	Length
1.	"Un Día de Show" (documentary)	Juan Ripari	9:54
2.	"1000 Años Luz" (live performance)	Juan Ripari	3:57
3.	"Asesina" (live performance)	Juan Ripari	3:32
4.	"No Estoy Sola" (music video)	Juan Ripari	3:47
5.	"A Bailar" (music video)	Juan Ripari	4:10
Total length:			25:20

=== Note ===
- Songwriting credits extracted from SADAIC official website.

== Charts performance ==
=== Monthly charts ===
Chart	Peak position
Uruguayan Albums (CUD)	3
Top 20 Albums Israel (IFPI)	15
Argentine Albums (CAPIF)	1

== Certifications ==
Region	Certification	Certified units/sales
Argentina (CAPIF)	Gold	20,000^{^}
^{^} Shipments figures based on certification alone.

== Release history ==
Region	Date	Version	Format	Label
Argentina	21 March 2014	Standard edition	CD	3musica
Worldwide	25 March 2014	Standard edition	Digital download	3musica
Worldwide	3 December 2014	Fanpack edition	Digital download	3musica; Sony Music
Argentina	9 December 2014	Fanpack edition	CD + DVD	3musica; Sony Music
Uruguay	19 December 2014	Fanpack edition	CD + DVD	3musica; Sony Music
Chile	23 March 2015	Fanpack edition	CD + DVD	3musica; Sony Music
Israel	8 April 2016	Standard edition	CD	Sony Music
