= Being (Lali song) =

2014 song by Lali

Song by Lali

from the album A Bailar
- Released: 21 March 2014
- Genre: Pop; electropop
- Length: 3:19
- Label: Self-released; Sony Music Argentina
- Songwriters: Mariana Espósito; Pablo Akselrad; Luis Burgio; Gustavo Novello; Antonella Giunta
- Producer: 3musica

Official audio
- "Being" on YouTube

"Being" is a song recorded by Argentine singer Lali. It appears on her debut studio album A Bailar (2014), and was written by Lali, Antonella Giunta, Peter Akselrad, Luis Burgio, Gustavo Novello. The track was produced by the latter three as 3musica. "Being" is one of the most experimental tracks on A Bailar, both in terms of sound and lyrical style.
