= Teatro Municipal Coliseo Podestá =

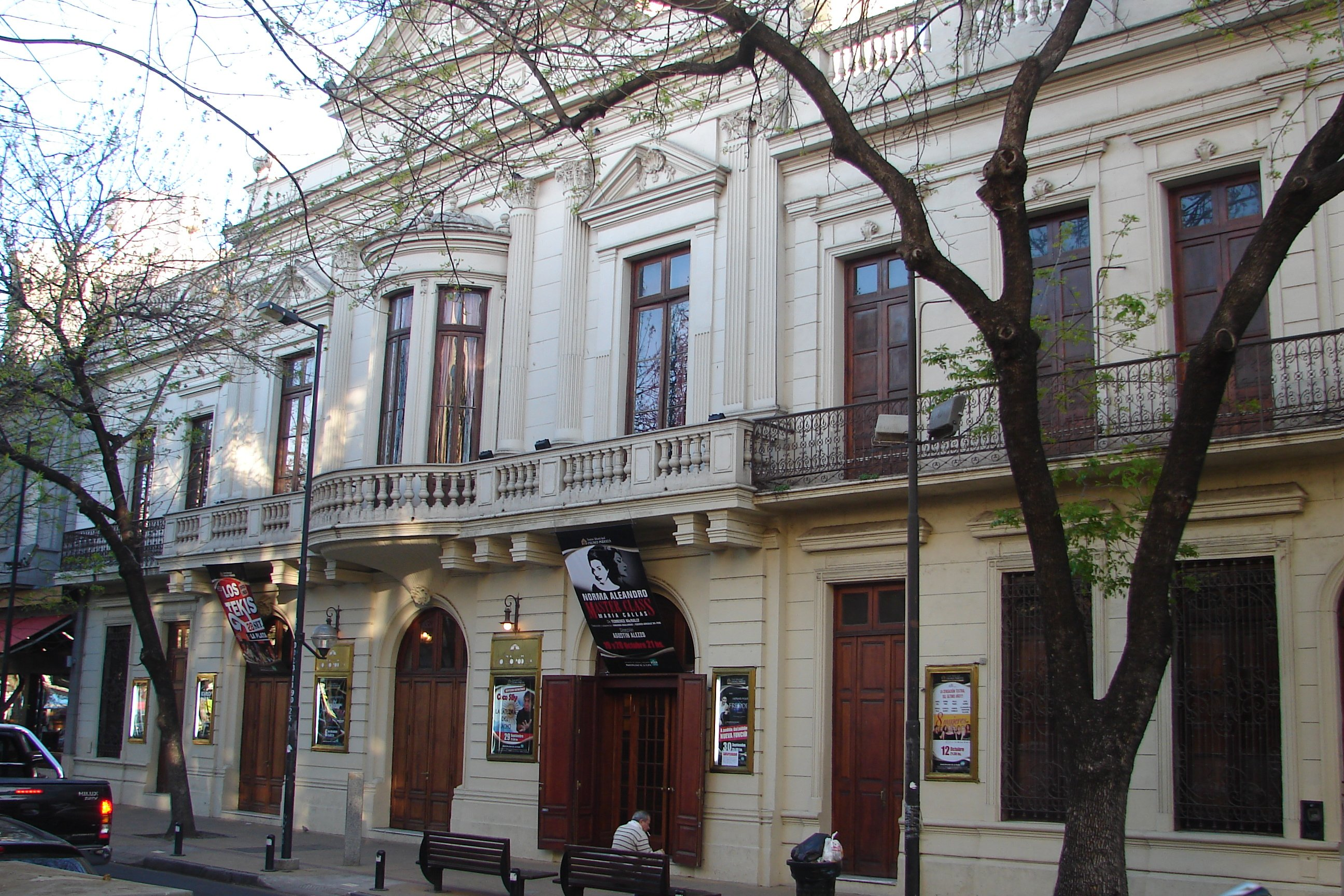
The theater, located on 10th Street.

The Teatro Municipal Coliseo Podestá is a 1,065-seat auditorium on the streets 46 and 47, avenue 10 (#733), City of La Plata, capital of the Buenos Aires Province, en Argentina.

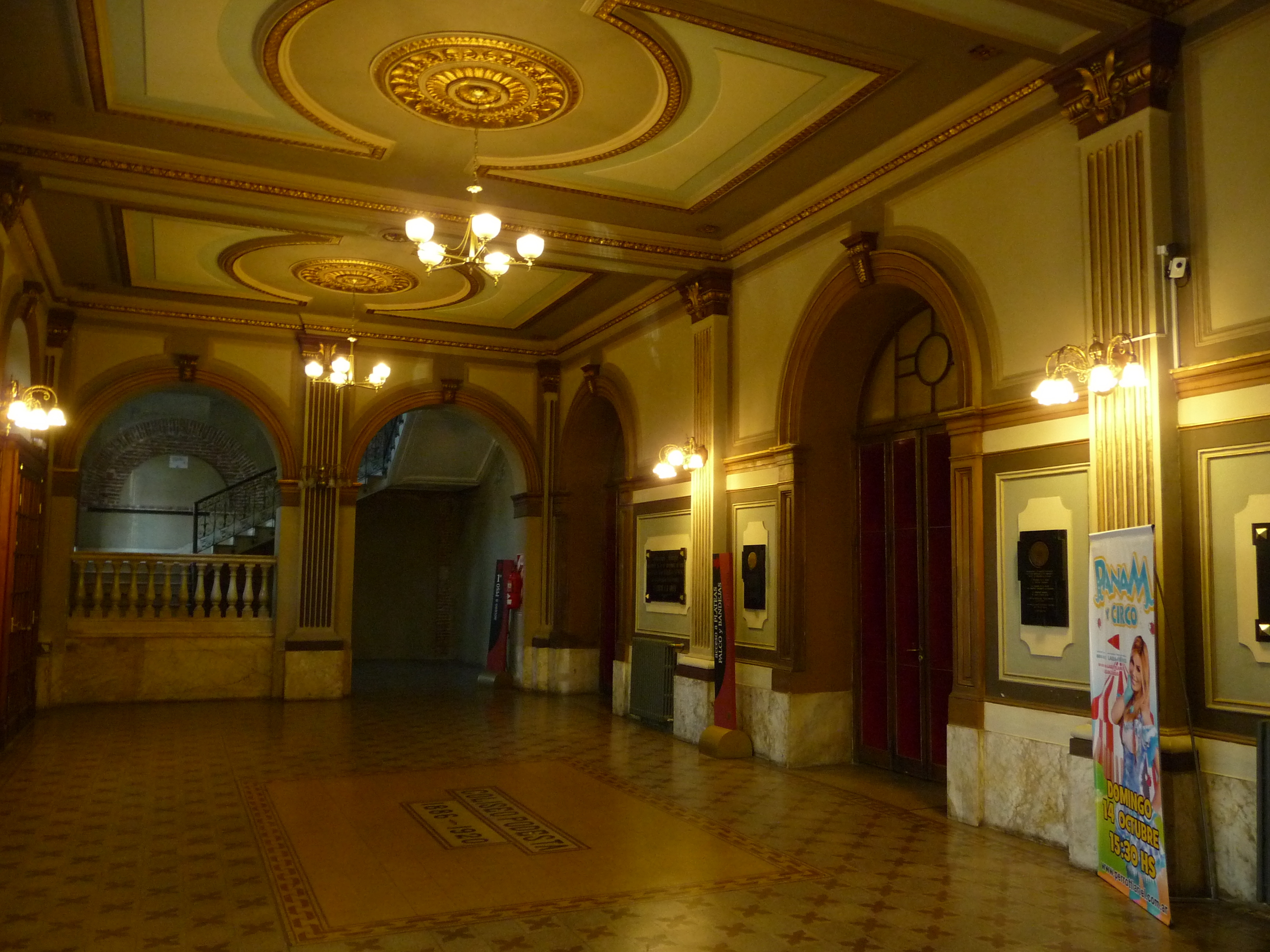
theater foyer.

Teatro Italian horseshoe by Uruguayan Carlos Zehndorf was originally called Teatro Politeama Olimpo opened on 19 November 1886 with the opera of Gioachino Rossini, The Barber of Seville by tenor Roberto Stagno and Gemma Bellincioni.

The following year, it was bought by Juan José Podestá, who makes it into the headquarters of his representations rioplatense pioneer theater company.

Here, operas premiered before of Buenos Aires and acted important figures as Remete Lacconi, Margarita Xirgu, Marian Anderson, Arthur Rubinstein, Lola Membrives and others.
