= Histeria (song) =

2015 single by Lali

Single by Lali

from the album A Bailar
- Released: 11 September 2015
- Genre: Pop; electropop
- Length: 3:30
- Label: Sony Music Argentina
- Songwriters: Mariana Espósito; Pablo Akselrad; Luis Burgio; Gustavo Novello
- Producer: 3musica

Lali singles chronology
"Del Otro Lado" (2015)	"Histeria" (2015)	"Soy" (2016)

Music video
- "Histeria" on YouTube

"Histeria" (transl. "hysteria") is a song by Argentine singer Lali, included in her debut studio album A Bailar (2014). It was officially released by Sony Music Argentina as the album's fifth single on 11 September 2015, alongside its music video. The track was written by Lali with Luis Burgio, Gustavo Novello, and Pablo Akselrad, who produced it as 3musica.

== Background and release ==
"Histeria" was originally included in A Bailar, released on 21 March 2014, but it wasn't released as a single until over a year later. In early September 2015, Lali teased the video with short previews posted to her social media accounts, building up anticipation among fans. The full video was then released on 11 September 2015, through her official Vevo channel.

== Lyrics and composition ==
"Histeria" explores the end of a relationship, portrayed through frustration and emotional detachment. The lyrics are direct, referencing manipulative behavior and emotional inconsistency. According to Lali, the song is a humorous yet critical take on love, particularly how "men can also play games, make mistakes, and be hysterical in relationships". She also described it as a colorful and energetic pop track filled with "expression, dance, explosion, and playfulness".

== Music video ==
The music video for "Histeria" premiered on Lali's Vevo channel on 11 September 2015, following a series of teaser clips on her YouTube and Instagram accounts. It quickly became the most viewed Argentine video within 24 hours, amassing more than 306,000 views on its first day.

Directed by Juan Ripari, who also directed her previous videos, the shoot lasted 15 hours and featured Lali in six different looks with vibrant wigs, bold makeup, and revealing outfits. The video ends with a body painting scene, in which Lali appears topless, marking one of her boldest visuals at the time. The clip showcases her dancing skills alongside eight background dancers, set against a backdrop of neon lights and colorful staging.

== Live performances ==
The song's television debut took place on 16 August 2014, during the Un Sol para los Chicos charity special, where Lali also performed "A Bailar" and "No Estoy Sola". On 26 October 2015, she performed it at the Kids' Choice Awards Argentina, right before "Mil Años Luz". On 20 December 2015, "Histeria" was included in her set at the tenth edition's season finale of Bailando por un Sueño Argentina, along with "A Bailar", "Tengo Esperanza" and "Cómo Haremos". She later performed the track on 21 February 2016, at the season premiere of Laten Argentinos, again paired with "A Bailar" and "Mil Años Luz". "Histeria" has also been a regular part of Lali's tour setlists since the A Bailar Tour.

== Music video ==
The video was released on Espósito's Vevo channel on September 11, 2015. Previously, Espósito had posted preview clips of the music video onto her YouTube channel before the music video release. The music video holds the record as the Argentine most viewed video in 24 hours with more than 306,000 views. The video was directed by Juan Ripari, who also directed all the previously music videos of Espósito.

== Awards and nominations ==
The song's music video was nominated in the category for Best Pop Video at the 2015 2015 Quiero Awards.

Year	Awards Ceremony	Category	Result
2015	Quiero Awards	Best Pop Video	Nominated
2015	Latin Italian Music Awards	Best Latin Female Video of The Year	Nominated

== Charts ==
Chart (2016)	Peak position
Argentina National Songs (Media Forest)	2
