= No Estoy Sola =

2014 song by Lali

Song by Lali

from the album A Bailar
- Released: 21 March 2014
- Genre: Pop; ballad
- Length: 3:39
- Label: Self-released; Sony Music Argentina
- Songwriters: Mariana Espósito; Pablo Akselrad; Luis Burgio; Gustavo Novello
- Producer: 3musica

Official audio
- "No Estoy Sola" on YouTube

"No Estoy Sola" (transl. "I am not alone") is a song recorded by Argentine singer Lali. It appears on her debut studio album A Bailar (2014) and was written by Lali with Peter Akselrad, Luis Burgio, and Gustavo Novello, who produced the track as 3musica.

== Lyrics and themes ==
"No Estoy Sola" is a heartfelt pop ballad that explores themes of emotional support, inner strength, and the comfort found in meaningful relationships. The lyrics speak of vulnerability and gratitude toward a guiding presence—interpreted by many fans as a tribute to a loved one or a spiritual connection.

== Music video ==
A music video was produced to accompany the song and highlight its inclusion in the A Bailar Tour setlist. Directed by Juan Ripari of Cinemática Films, the video features intimate footage of Lali's personal life, including appearances by her family, fans, and then-boyfriend Benjamín Amadeo. The video was never officially released to digital platforms, though it was later included in the deluxe edition of A Bailar, released in December 2014.

== Live performances ==
Lali first performed "No Estoy Sola" on television during the charity special Un Sol para los Chicos on 8 August 2014, alongside her songs "A Bailar" and "Histeria". The song remained a regular part of her A Bailar Tour setlist, often presented as one of the show's emotional highlights.
