= Asesina (Lali song) =

2014 single by Lali

Single by Lali

from the album A Bailar
- Released: 10 March 2014
- Recorded: 2013
- Genre: Dance-pop; hip hop
- Length: 3:09
- Label: Self-released
- Songwriter(s): Mariana Espósito; Pablo Akselrad; Luis Burgio; Gustavo Novello
- Producer(s): 3musica

Lali singles chronology
| "A Bailar" (2013) | "Asesina" (2014) | "Mil Años Luz" (2014) |

Music video
- "Asesina" on YouTube

"Asesina" (transl. "murderess") is a song recorded by Argentine singer Lali, serving as the second single from her debut studio album A Bailar (2014). The song was first released as a promotional single on 29 October 2014, and then as an official single on 10 March 2014. It was written by Lali in collaboration with its producers, Pablo Akselrad, Luis Burgio and Gustavo Novello from the production company 3musica.

== Background and release ==
"Asesina" was first introduced on 2 September 2013 during a live performance at La Trastienda Club, marking Lali's official debut as a solo artist, where she also premiered "A Bailar" and "Del Otro Lado".

The song was released as a promotional single on 29 October 2013, and later became the album's second official single on 10 March 2014, coinciding with the premiere of its music video.

== Themes and composition ==
Musically, "Asesina" blends pop and dance influences, in line with the overall sound of A Bailar, which incorporates elements of hip hop, pop, and electronic music.

Lyrically, the song portrays a powerful and seductive female figure who takes control through dance and physical attraction. Lali adopts a dominant, almost ghost-like persona, describing herself as an irresistible and haunting presence. She uses sensual metaphors and provocative imagery, echoed in both the production and Lali's vocal and visual performance.

== Music video ==
The official music video for "Asesina" was directed by Juan Ripari and released on Lali's YouTube channel on 10 March 2014. Set in an abandoned warehouse, the video features Lali dressed in leather outfits, performing choreographed routines alongside a group of dancers.

Argentine dancer Facundo Mazzei appears as the male lead. He shares several scenes with Lali, including a rain-soaked dance and a kiss, adding to the clip's provocative tone. The video's style drew comparisons to international pop stars like Beyoncé and Shakira, particularly for its mix of sensuality, strength, and choreographic precision.

=== Reception ===
The release of the "Asesina" video received widespread coverage in Argentine media, which highlighted Lali's shift toward a more mature and sensual image, distancing herself from her earlier roles in youth-oriented TV shows like Casi Ángeles. The video was described by outlets as "provocative", "sensual," and "bold", with praise for its strong visual impact and choreography.

== Live performances ==
Lali performed "Asesina" for the first time on her solo artist release event at La Trastienda on 2 September 2013. On 11 September 2014, the singer performed the song at the ninth edition of Bailando por un Sueño. "Asesina" was part of the setlist of Espósito's worldwide A Bailar Tour, serving as both the opening and the encore songs of the show.

== Awards and nominations ==
The song's music video won in the category for Best Choreography at the 2014 Quiero Awards.

| Year | Awards Ceremony | Category | Result |
|---|---|---|---|
| 2014 | Quiero Awards | Best Choreography | Won |
