= Del Otro Lado =

2015 single by Lali

Single by Lali

from the album A Bailar
- Released: 7 January 2015
- Recorded: 2013
- Genre: Pop; ballad
- Length: 3:36
- Label: Sony Music Argentina
- Songwriters: Mariana Espósito; Pablo Akselrad; Luis Burgio; Gustavo Novello
- Producer: 3musica

Lali singles chronology
"Mil Años Luz" (2014)	"Del Otro Lado" (2015)	"Histeria" (2015)

Music video
- "Del Otro Lado" on YouTube

"Del Otro Lado" (transl. "on the other side") is a song by Argentine singer Lali, included on her debut studio album A Bailar (2014). It was written by Lali along with Pablo Akselrad, Luis Burgio, and Gustavo Novello, who also handled the production as 3musica. The song was first released independently as a promotional single on 4 October 2013, and later officially re-released as the album's fourth single on 7 January 2015, following Lali's signing with Sony Music Argentina. A lyric video was released alongside the official single release, and the music video premiered on 10 March 2015.

== Background and release ==
"Del Otro Lado" was one of the songs Lali debuted live at her first solo concert at La Trastienda Club on 3 September 2013. Along with "A Bailar" and "Asesina", it marked the launch of her solo career following her time in the pop group Teen Angels.

The track was initially released independently as a promotional single on 4 October 2013, ahead of the album A Bailar, which came out on 10 March 2014. After signing with Sony Music Argentina in November 2014, the song was released as an official single on 7 January 2015, along with a lyric video. The official music video premiered a few months later, on 10 March 2015.

== Lyrics and composition ==
"Del Otro Lado" is a dramatic pop ballad that explores the emotional aftermath of a breakup from a woman's perspective. The lyrics reflect the silence, pain, and emotional emptiness left after love ends. The track uses poetic imagery such as "tu cielo me arrasó, mi vestido rompió" ("your sky devastated me, tore my dress") and "la flor que había en él conmigo lloró" ("the flower on it cried with me") to convey vulnerability and heartbreak. The repeated refrain "del otro lado estoy" ("I'm on the other side") reinforces the feeling of separation and emotional distance.

== Music video ==
The official music video for "Del Otro Lado", released on 10 March 2015, features a sensual and emotional visual narrative. It opens with Lali lying alone in bed, soon joined by a man with whom she shares intimate and passionate moments. The relationship quickly turns sour, and the storyline ends with a dramatic breakup scene in which Lali throws objects—like flowers and a vase—at her fictional partner. The video's tone reflects the heartbreak described in the lyrics.

Several media outlets highlighted the clip's sensuality and noted its similarities to Taylor Swift's "Blank Space", particularly in the way it portrays a relationship that moves from romance to chaos. The video premiered with an exclusive fan event in Buenos Aires and became a trending topic on Twitter and a top-viewed video on YouTube Argentina.

== Live performances ==
Lali performed "Del Otro Lado" live for the first time on 3 September 2013 at La Trastienda Club, accompanied by a live band and dancers. On 2 June 2014, it was performed on The U-Mix Show alongside "Cielo Salvador". The song was also included in the setlist of her A Bailar Tour, which took her across Argentina, Latin America, and Europe.

== Accolades ==
The song won in the category for Latin Song of the Summer at the 2015 Latin Music Italian Awards and Best Female Video at the 2015 Quiero Awards.

Year	Awards Ceremony	Category	Result
2015	Latin Music Italian Awards	Latin Song of the Summer	Won
2015	Quiero Awards	Best Female Video	Won
