= Boomerang (Lali song) =

Song by Lali Espósito

Single by Lali

from the album Soy
- Released: September 4, 2016
- Recorded: 2016
- Genre: Pop; electropop
- Length: 4:17
- Label: Sony Music Argentina
- Songwriters: Ayak Thiik; Will Simms; Mariana Espósito; Pablo Akselrad; Luis Burgio; Gustavo Novello
- Producers: Will Simms; 3musica

Lali singles chronology
"Soy" (2016)	"Boomerang" (2016)	"Mueve" (2016)

Music video
- "Boomerang" on YouTube

"Boomerang" is a song recorded by the Argentinian singer and actress Lali Espósito released as the third single for her second studio album, Soy, on September 4, 2016. The song is a Spanish version of the original by Ayak Thiik and Will Simms, written by Espósito along with the music producers Pablo Akselrad, Luis Burgio and Gustavo Novello. It was produced by Will Simms and 3musica.

== Background and release ==
Espósito had confirmed the name of the track in an interview in Animales Sueltos on March 11, 2016. It was released with the full album on May 20, 2016, and was sent to radio on September 4, 2016, as its third single. Lyrically, the song talks about the constant criticism and fallacies that Espósito must face. She warns that everything returns like a boomerang.

== Live performances ==
Espósito performed a medley of "Boomerang", "Unico" and "Soy" on the TV show Susana Giménez on August 7, 2016. On August 13, 2016, she performed the song with "Unico", "Soy", "Mil Años Luz" and "A Bailar" on the charity TV special Un Sol para los Chicos. On October 27, 2016, Espósito performed "Boomerang" and "Soy" at the eleventh season of Bailando por un Sueño Argentina, when she participated on a María del Cerro's dance routine.

== Music video ==
In the week before the video's release, Espósito had shared small advances through her Instagram account where she can be seen a lot of transformations, going from brunette to blonde, female to male, humor and with the society's appearances. Directed by Juan Ripari, the music video was premiered on September 7, 2016, on Vevo. In the video, Espósito mocks and laughs at fame, her in the press and situations in society. With different characters of society, the singer shows how they consume as true information media and social networks and makes the whole video like a parody. Espósito portrays six characters (a fitness girl, a TV host, a rich lady, an old women, a taxi driver, and a figure who is supposed to be karma) apart from herself on the cover of a magazine. Throughout the video, each character behaves in a mean or disrespectful way until karma appears and something happens to them. The video also refers to the pressures exerted by the media to be shown always cute and stoic: "She's there and nothing's gonna defeat her". The video was filmed on two full shooting sessions and the characterization of each character took about three hours.

Mayte Urrutia from Pop en Español praised Espósito's dancing and acting abilities by saying, "Lali not only has showed her beauty, her talent for dance alone and escorted by a group of dancers, but [the video] is also very frequent humor". In a post by the Argentinian website Cadena3, it was written, "It denotes a huge production and staging, and also the talent that [Espósito] has to portray different characters and show her funniest side." Perez Hilton described "Boomerang" as "a fun Latin pop song" and compared the video to Katy Perry's "Birthday".

== Other versions ==
Espósito released an acoustic binaural version of the song along with an advertising short film for CokeTV Spain, directed by Alberto Evangelio. The film shows how the singer was inspired to write the song. She says, "I like to think that things work as a boomerang. I wrote it to ask why we need to criticize each other. I think that we should try to be more understanding, share moments, love each other -even those who don't seem to deserve our love- because everything returns".

In an interview with LatinPop Brasil, Espósito said that she was working on a Portuguese version of the song and did not discard the possibility of teaming up with Anitta on it. The Portuguese version of "Boomerang" was premiered on MTV Latin America's website on December 19, 2017, along with an accompanying lyric video. However, the song was removed from the website on December 22, 2017, for unknown reasons.

== Awards and nominations ==
The song's music video won the Quiero Award for "Best Choreography" in 2016.

Year	Awards ceremony	Category	Result
2016	Quiero Awards	Best Choreography	Won

== Release history ==
Region	Date	Format	Label	Ref.
Worldwide	May 20, 2016	Digital download	Sony Music	
