= Teatro Ópera =

Theatre and cinema in Buenos Aires, Argentina

Coordinates: 34°36′13.5″S 58°22′44.2″W

The Teatro Opera (Opera Theatre) is a prominent cinema and theatre house in Buenos Aires, Argentina.

== Introduction ==
The Teatro Opera (officially called Opera Orbis Seguros for commercial advertising reasons), is located at 860 Avenida Corrientes in the City of Buenos Aires, Argentina. It is about 200 meters from the Obelisk of the city, which is a historical monument that was constructed in 1936. International artists such as Ava Gardner, Édith Piaf, Raffaella Carrà, Mina Mazzini, the Folies Bergère, Le Lido de París, Fairuz, and the band R5 have performed in this theater. Local artists perform as well such as Los Abuelos de la Nada, who recorded their live album here, and the Ariel Ramírez Folklore Company, who performed with Jaime Torres and Las Voces Blancas at the premier of the movie “Crónica para un futuro,” in 1967. This film was the precursor to the false documentary genre.

== History ==
The origin of the theater dates back to 1870, when businessman Antonio Pestalardo envisioned that Corrientes, which at the time was still a narrow street far from the center of Buenos Aires, would be brought to life by the installation of theaters. His project faced many obstacles, as the yellow fever epidemic broke out the following year. To make matters worse, the city's port was closed, which blocked the entry of materials that were needed for construction. Finally, Pestalardo achieved his goal and thus the Teatro Opera was born. It was originally dedicated to the lyrical genre and was inaugurated on May 25, 1872, with the opera Il Trovatore. It was the first theater to have gas lighting, which was unusual for the time.

In 1889 the building underwent a total remodeling financed by its new owner Don Roberto Cano. Rufino Varela installed an electric power plant in the new building which allowed it to be self-sufficient, a privilege in Buenos Aires at the end of the 19th century. As soon as 1936, the widening of Corrientes street proved that the once narrow street would become an important avenue. Although the demolitions were carried out on the northside of the street and would have no effect on the theater building, the owner Clemente Lococo took advantage of the opportunity to construct a third and final opera house.

In 1997, the theater was acquired by the private events company Time for Fun (T4F).

=== Restoration and Renaming ===
In 2010, CitiBank bought the rights to Teatro Opera for three years from T4F, and carried out restoration work on the façade and interior, and added new lighting. In exchange, the name Teatro Citi was imposed on the building, which aroused rejection not only from a large number of neighbors, but also local newspaper columnists^{,} and civil foundations. The name change was considered an illegal operation, since the building is protected by laws 1227, 2548, and 3056 of Cultural Heritage. Additionally, the building was constructed before 1941, which requires a binding consultation with the Advisory Council on Heritage Affairs. This did not happen, so the restoration itself entered the realm of illegality. The operation generated an immediate response on Facebook, demanding the restitution of the name. There were more than 3500 adherents in the first 6 days. Citi had to open an opinion forum on their Facebook page, receiving dozens of messages every day questioning the name change. Witnessing the frustration caused by their marketing operation on their own Facebook page, the bank responded:

“Addressing the challenge of enhancing the value of the building involved a significant investment that was only justified by a substantial sponsorship of the theater. The one that best suited the required values was “naming sponsor.” Once that decision was made, we were left with a difficult choice: keep the original name (with a compound alternative, such as Opera Citi, for example), or not use it. We evaluated the different options, and although we were intrigued by the compound name, it implied that two different companies (Citi and T4F, owners of the name Teatro Opera) shared that new brand, which our global policy brand did not accept.”

Later, the famous Argentinian actresses Susana Giménez and Mirtha Legrand joined the criticism on their television program in the first week of May. Enrique Pinti y Antonio Gasalla also joined the protests. The owners then changed the name to Opera Citi.

Meanwhile, in May 2010, the Buenos Aires Legislature voted on a request for reports on the name change. This was based on a project presented by the Buenos Aires deputy Sergio Abrevaya, who had already presented a project for the theater to be cataloged with the Structural degree. Finally, on May 26, 2012, the Buenos Aires Legislature approved in a second and final reading a law that catalogs the theater with a level of structural protection, declares it a monument, and preserves its historical name: Teatro Opera.

Since April 2014, the sponsoring brand is no longer Citibank and became the Allianz group instead, thus its new name became Teatro Opera Allianz.

In July 2017, T4F, the entertainment and production company and owner of Teatro Opera, signed a commercial and advertising agreement for four years with the firm Orbis Seguros. This launched the Opera Orbis Seguros brand which is still the name today.

== Architecture ==
=== Previous buildings ===
The first Opera House (1872), managed by Pestalarado, was designed by architect Emile Landois. It had an Italianate facade which was drawn with respect to the public property line, resulting in a small atrium without a marquee, adorned by iron lanterns and with five wooden gates that led to the foyer.

It was a simple front, which stood out only for the four Corinthian columns that supported the top (similar to a pediment) which completed the building. According to various accounts, the Pestalardo's Opera Theater was built using the plans that Landois had drawn in 1855 for a project for the Teatro Colón that was ultimately not completed.

When Robert Cano took charge of the Ópera, he ordered the total remodeling of the building, a project assigned to prestigious Belgian architect Julio Dormal (who also was involved of the design of the current Teatro Colón), who designed a new exterior that discarded the atrium of the original building, in accordance with the private property line. It was a much more ornate design than the previous one. Designed in the Beaux-Arts style, it featured elaborate moldings and abundant textures crafted on the columns and other surfaces. A finishing pedestal at the top of the building included a statue which dominated the design of the facade.

In the foyer of the theater, designed by Dormal, the opulence continued with the ornate decoration displayed both in the elaborate artesonado, as well as in the moldings, wallpaper, and the ceramic tiles on the floors. Intricate iron chandeliers illuminated the entire lobby, which featured numerous individual wooden chairs with red velvet and matching draperies at all openings. The hall resembled characteristic Italian theater, with five opera boxes, an immense chandelier, and a dome adorned with an allegorical mural.

=== Current building ===
In 1935, the Belgian architect Alberto Bourdon designed the current Teatro Ópera, with a characteristic Art Deco facade (inspired by the Rex cinema in Paris), with a capacity for 2,500 people, a stage suitable for various shows and a large cinema screen.

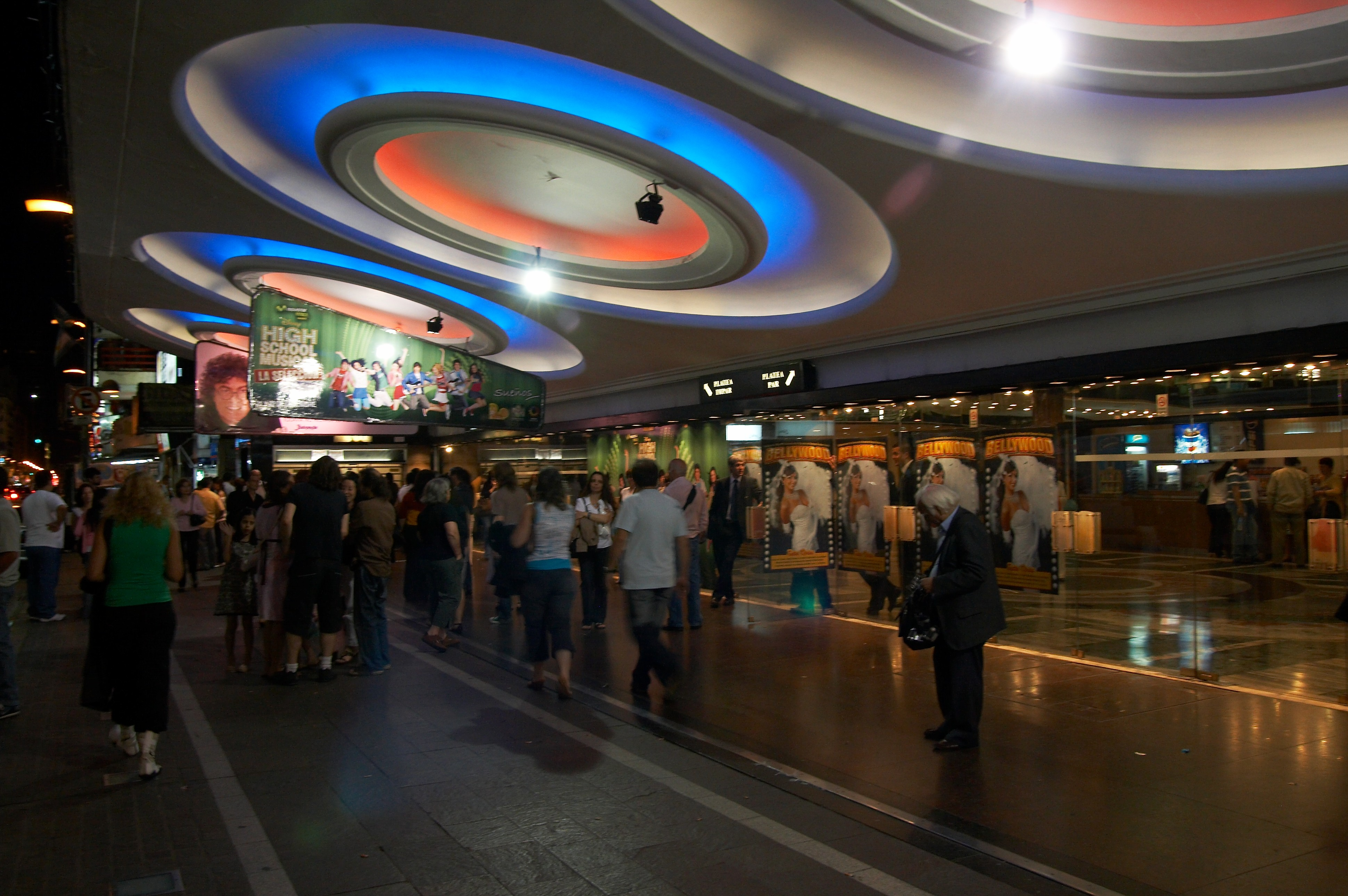
The theatre entrance

In short, the Teatro Ópera is one of the most important at the building level in Buenos Aires, and one of the best examples of Art Deco architecture in the city — this was despite the fact that Art Deco had largely ceased to be avant-garde at the time of the theatre's construction. Its facade is imposing, sporting a central volume with curved lines, columns and numerous elongated windows, which ends in a stepped tower which gives the building its signature look. At each end, the front is covered in black granite, with borders of glass etched with concentric semicircular patterns that are very characteristic of Art Deco decoration. The marquee is another important element — at night three large circular LED flood lights illuminate the sidewalk, constantly changing color.

Inside the theater, the foyer is another impressive space, and no materials were spared in its design. Two imperial staircases lean against the dividing of the building, leading to two mezzanines which sport railings with a circular section of chromed iron (a material widely used in Art Deco architecture) and bronze caps at the ends. The walls are covered in black granite and images are inlaid in the floor different types of colored marble. The floors of the mezzanines outline a succession of semicircles that match the large flood light that illuminates the hall.

The original hall of the Teatro Ópera was totally revolutionary for its time. It completely moved away from the typical Italian-style theater of the old building, to a modern cinema with a main floor and upper level. But the most remarkable thing about the venue was its decoration — to begin with, the ceiling of the room simulated a starry night sky that was lit before performances. As a totally unusual detail, the side walls of the stage were decorated with a design that simulated an Art Deco style city, with balconies, stairs, domes and windows, alluding to the intense nightlife of Buenos Aires in the years 1930 and especially on Corrientes Avenue, known in those years as "the street that never sleeps".

The architect Carlos Méndez Mosquera, a follower of the modern architecture movement, made harsh criticism of its aesthetics, although he recognized the quality of its construction:

The architectural proposal is formally absurd. Of course it fulfills the functional needs of a cinema, but its interior space is covered with a series of inadequate scenographic decorations, culminating in an incredible ceiling with stars and nebulae (!). The entrance hall and its respective mezzanines "integrate" with the layout of the room, resulting in a strange display of decorative forms and materials. The exterior facade reflects the same spirit and results in a work that, according to the postulates of contemporary architecture, or even those of academic architecture, is of mediocre quality. But the materials with which the building is built (the veneer of the doors, the carpentry), are of a level that disorients the observer. Analyze a bathroom in this cinema, its cladding, its facilities, its most intimate details, and it will be recognized that it would be worthy of appearing as an example of contemporary architecture (even in the Deutsche Werkbund!)

=== Remodel ===
In 1997, the theater was remodeled to host productions of major Broadway and West End musicals. The work chosen for its reopening was Beauty and the Beast, followed by Les Misérables, Chicago, The Phantom of the Opera (2009), the revival of Beauty and the Beast (2010), The Sound of Music (2011), Mama Mia! (2012) and The Addams Family (2013). As a result of this remodeling, one of the wonders of the interior of the room was lost forever — the ceiling that simulated a starry sky (an allusion to the stars on the screen) and part of the decoration on the sides of the room. Film previews and cultural meetings are held in the basement room known as the Petit Ópera.

== International performances ==
- Raffaella Carrà
- Cocteau Twins
- Louis Armstrong
- Ella Fitzgerald
- Ava Gardner
- Josephine Baker
- Edith Piaf
- Ringo Starr
- Pet Shop Boys
- Björk
- Echo & The Bunnymen
- Marillion
- Nick Cave & The Bad Seeds
- Rainbow
- Laura Pausini
- R5
- Morrissey
- Astor Piazzolla
- Extreme
- REO Speedwagon
- America
- Paolo Nutini
- Grace Jones
- Tony Bennett
- Lindsey Stirling
- Richard Marx
- Pete Seeger
