= Unico (song) =

Promotional single by Lali

from the album Soy
- Released: March 20, 2016
- Recorded: 2016
- Genre: Pop; electropop; dubstep
- Length: 3:40
- Label: Sony Music
- Songwriters: Mariana Espósito; Pablo Akselrad; Luis Burgio; Gustavo Novello
- Producer: 3musica

"Unico" is a song recorded by Argentine singer Lali, released on March 20, 2016. Originally intended to be the lead single of her second studio album Soy, the song was replaced with the title track "Soy" as the lead single. The song was written by Espósito, Pablo Akselrad, Luis Burgio and Gustavo Novello, with production being done by 3musica.

== Background and release ==
Espósito recorded the song while touring with the A Bailar Tour. On January 26 and February 18, 2016, the singer posted previews of the song on her Instagram account. The song was first released on iTunes Store on March 20, 2016.

== Live performances ==
Espósito performed the song before its release at last shows of the A Bailar Tour including the shows in Buenos Aires, Santiago and Tel Aviv. Additionally, the singer performed "Unico" at the Radio Disney Vivo Music Festival on May 13, 2016. Espósito performed "Unico" for the first time in TV on the 27th season premiere of Showmatch along with "Soy", on May 30, 2016. The performance, which was ranked as one of the best moments of the night, received positive reviews. Diario Veloz stated that "Espósito's figure emerged from the chiaroscuro caused by the lighting effects and joined her dancers on an explosive performance". El Trece's official website admitted that "a lot of Bailando por un Sueño contestants would love to do something as similar [as Espósito did] to stand out and get to the finals." On August 7, 2016, Espósito performed the song in a medley with "Boomerang" and "Soy" on Susana Giménez.

== Lyric video ==
The lyric video of the song was uploaded to Espósito's official Vevo channel on March 20, 2016. This video shows off Espósito naked and with different lipstick colours, singing along with the lyrics on screen.

== Critical reception ==
Upon its release, "Unico" received critical acclaim from music critics. Latin Pop Brasil stated that "[the song] contains a very electronic style, with elements from dubstep and an international sound, not so latin". Also, Cadena3 named the song as the "best song of the autumn".

== Charts ==
Chart performance for "Unico"
Chart (2016)	Peak position
Paraguay (Audimedia)	2
