= Soy (song) =

Single by Lali

from the album Soy
- Released: May 5, 2016
- Recorded: 2016
- Genre: Pop; electropop
- Length: 3:31
- Label: Sony Music
- Songwriters: Mariana Espósito; Pablo Akselrad; Luis Burgio; Gustavo Novello
- Producer: 3musica

Lali singles chronology
"Histeria" (2015)	"Soy" (2016)	"Boomerang" (2016)

Music video
- "Lali - Soy (Official Video) " on YouTube

"Soy" (Spanish pronunciation: [soj]; English: "I Am") is a song recorded by Argentine singer Lali serving as the lead single for her second studio album Soy and was released on May 5, 2016. The song was written by Espósito along with music producers Pablo Akselrad, Luis Burgio and Gustavo Novello, and was produced by 3musica. The song reached number 1 on the official chart of the Lista 40

== Background and release ==
In March 2016, Lali Espósito released "Unico" as the intended first single of her second studio album, Soy. Espósito said that the song is "a simple but deep definition to understand what it means to be oneself. [The lyrics] are my thoughts, my joys, my pains, stories and beliefs made song; music that makes us feel alive, that makes us be". The song became the Espósito's first No. 1 hit on the Argentina Lista 40.

== Live performances ==
Espósito performed "Soy" for the first time in TV on May 30, 2016 at Showmatch's 27th-season premiere along with "Unico". The performance, which was ranked as one of the best moments of the night, received positive reviews. Diario Veloz stated that "Espósito's figure emerged from the chiaroscuro caused by the lighting effects and joined her dancers on an explosive performance". El Trece's official website admitted that "a lot of Bailando por un Sueño contestants would love to do something as similar [as Espósito did] to stand out and get to the finals." On August 7, 2016, Espósito performed a medley of "Unico", "Boomerang" and "Soy" at Susana Giménez. On October 27, 2016 Espósito performed "Boomerang" and "Soy" at the eleventh season of Bailando por un Sueño Argentina, where she appeared on a María del Cerro's performance.

== Music video ==
The lyric video of the song was uploaded to Espósito's official Vevo channel on May 18, 2016. Directed by Juan Ripari, the music video made its premiere on July 1, 2016 on Vevo. With a contagious rhythm, the video is fully consistent with the lyrics of this very emotional song. "SOY" talks about what Espósito always wanted to be and now she is. The song tells about how it was the trajectory of her feelings while she was living her dream. The video shows part of her childhood with how she danced in front of the mirror dancing and singing. "SOY" also has its sensual part where she gives us incredible choreography. She mixed different types of dance and lighting while presenting her professional dancers and musicians. We can also listen to the fusion of various musical genres such as pop, dance, and disco, transmitting to her audience different emotions.

== Accolades ==
For the 2016 Argentina Kids' Choice Awards, "Soy" won in the category for Favorite Latin Song. The song also won a Quiero Award for Best Female Video, while being nominated for Video of the Year and Best Instagrammer Artist Video. "Soy" received a nomination for the 19th Annual Gardel Awards.

Year	Ceremony	Category	Result	Ref.
2016	Argentina Kids' Choice Awards	Favorite Latin Song	Won	
2016	Quiero Awards	Video of The Year	Nominated	
2016	Quiero Awards	Best Female Video	Won	
2016	Quiero Awards	Best Instagram Artist Video	Nominated	
2017	Gardel Awards	Song of the Year	Nominated	

== Charts ==
Chart (2016)	Peak position
Argentina National Songs (Monitor Latino)	5
Ecuador Pop Songs (Monitor Latino)	15

== Release history ==
Region	Date	Format	Label	Ref.
Worldwide	May 5, 2016	Digital download	Sony Music	
Latin America	June 14, 2016	Contemporary Hit Radio	Sony Music	
Poland	November 21, 2016	Contemporary Hit Radio	Sony Music	
