= Mil Años Luz =

2014 single by Lali

Single by Lali

from the album A Bailar
- Released: 19 November 2014
- Genre: Pop; EDM; dubstep
- Length: 3:48
- Label: Sony Music Argentina
- Songwriter(s): Mariana Espósito; Pablo Akselrad; Luis Burgio; Gustavo Novello
- Producer(s): 3musica

Lali singles chronology
"Asesina" (2014)	"Mil Años Luz" (2014)	"Del Otro Lado" (2015)

Music video
- "Mil Años Luz" on YouTube

"Mil Años Luz" (transl. "a thousand light years") is a song by Argentine singer Lali, included on her debut album A Bailar, released independently on 21 March 2014. The track was written by Lali, Luis Burgio, Gustavo Novelo, and Pablo Akselrad, and produced by the latter three as the production team 3musica. In November 2014, Lali signed with Sony Music Argentina, and the song was officially released as the album's third single.

== Background and release ==
Lali performed "Mil Años Luz" on 19 November 2014 during a live appearance on the Susana Giménez show. At that point, she was wrapping up her first year as a solo artist, which included five sold-out shows at the Opera Theatre in Buenos Aires and a Latin American tour. The same month, she transitioned from being an independent artist to signing with Sony Music. Finally, on 10 February 2015, a live performance music video for the song was released on Lali's YouTube channel.

== Lyrics and composition ==
"Mil Años Luz" blends pop with dubstep and electronic music, driven by a high-energy beat and a danceable groove. Lyrically, the song is about letting go and embracing the moment. Live performances of the track typically feature elaborate choreography and lighting effects that amplify its vibrant, party-like atmosphere.

== Music video ==
The official music video for "Mil Años Luz" premiered on 10 February 2015. The clip showed a multi-angle live performance from the A Bailar Tour and featured Lali dancing alongside her team in a sleek, visually dynamic setting.

== Live performances ==
Lali first performed "Mil Años Luz" on television during her appearance on Susana Giménez in 19 November 2014. She later included the song in high-profile events such as the opening night of the twenty-fifth season of Showmatch, where she stood out for her set's striking visual effects, including a dramatic use of lights projected over a large dress she wore for the performance. The show mixed techno and pop elements, with Lali delivering a choreography-heavy routine that became one of the highlights of the night. She also performed the song at the 17th Annual Premios Gardel, where her performance was among the most anticipated and praised of the evening. That night, she won the awards for Best New Pop Artist and Best Female Pop Album.

== Awards and nominations ==
"Mil Años Luz" won the award for "Favorite Song" at the 2015 Kids' Choice Awards Argentina. Its music video received a nomination for Best Coreography at the 2015 Quiero Awards.

Year	Awards Ceremony	Category	Result
2015	Kids' Choice Awards Argentina	Favorite Song	Won
2015	Premios Quiero	Best Choreography	Nominated
