= La Trastienda Club =

Music venue in Buenos Aires, Argentina

Coordinates: 34°36′47″S 58°22′14″W

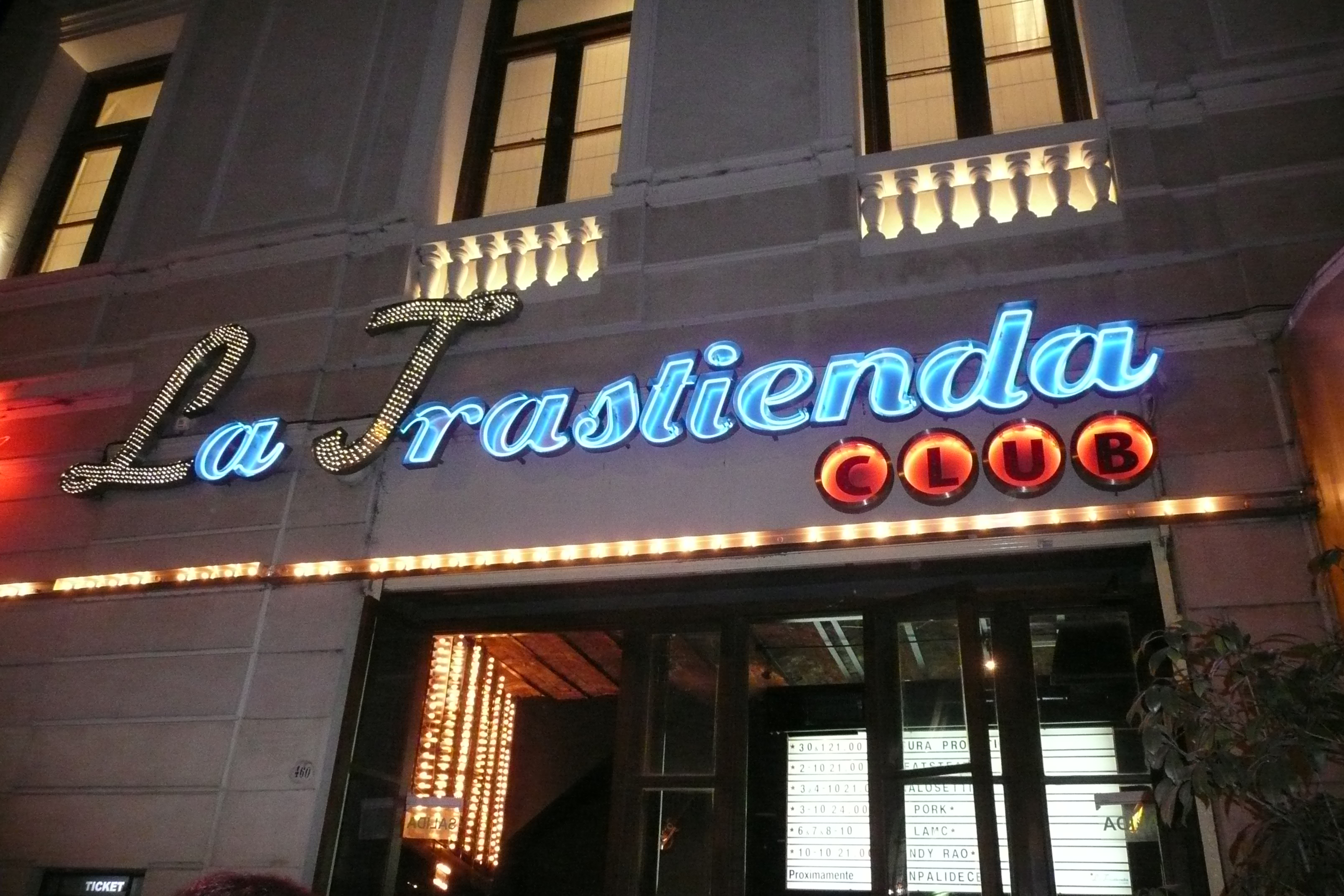
- La Trastienda Club (Buenos Aires) Location in Buenos Aires
- Interactive map of La Trastienda Club
- Address: Balcarce 460
- Location: Buenos Aires, Argentina
- Capacity: 700
- Type: Café-concert
- Events: World music, jazz

Construction
- Built: 1895
- Opened: September 1979
- Renovated: 2005
- Closed: 1984 (reopened: December 1993)

Website
- Official website

La Trastienda Club is a prominent café-concert style venue in Buenos Aires.

The club was established in 1993 in a late 19th-century building originally housing a corner grocery in the Montserrat section of Buenos Aires. Seating 400 with standing-room capacity for another 1,000, its proximity to both downtown and the bohemian chic San Telmo section of the city has since helped make it one of the city's best known café-concerts and a leading local venue for artists in the world music, funk, jazz and other genres, featuring performers and bands from both Argentina and abroad.

== Notable performances ==
- George Clinton
- Maceo Parker
- Living Colour
- Ed Motta
- The National
- Pavement
- Elefant
- Adrián Iaies
- The Kooks
- Medeski Martin & Wood
- Bob Telson
- Tarja Turunen
- The Wailers
- Damien Rice
- McFly
- Gilby Clarke
- Mark Knopfler
- Black Midi
- León Gieco
- Bersuit Vergarabat
- Alejandro Lerner
- Gustavo Cordera
- G.I.T.
