= A Bailar (song) =

Single by Lali

from the album A Bailar
- Released: 5 August 2013
- Recorded: 2013
- Genre: Latin pop
- Length: 2:52
- Label: Self-released
- Songwriters: Mariana Espósito; Pablo Akselrad; Luis Burgio; Gustavo Novello
- Producer: 3musica

Lali singles chronology
"A Bailar" (2013)	"Asesina" (2014)

Music video
- "A Bailar" on YouTube

"A Bailar" (transl. "let's dance") is the debut single by Argentine singer Lali, released as the lead single from her first studio album of the same name (2014). The independent release was made available for digital download via Lali's official website on 5 August 2013. It was written by Lali and its producers Pablo Akselrad, Luis Burgio, and Gustavo Novello of the production team 3musica.

== Background and release ==
In 2013, Lali announced the beginning of her solo music career, following her success in television shows such as Casi Ángeles and Solamente Vos, and as a member of the teen pop group Teen Angels. She revealed the news through social media and a live Twitcam broadcast, where she introduced her debut single, "A Bailar", which would serve as the first preview of her upcoming studio album.

The song premiered on her official website, where fans were able to listen to a 35-second preview. Espósito described the project as deeply personal and true to her artistic identity, emphasizing that the music was designed to reflect her passion for dancing. Her official live debut as a solo artist took place at La Trastienda Club in Buenos Aires, in a show sponsored by Coca-Cola and streamed live through the brand's online radio platform.

== Themes and composition ==
"A Bailar" blends dance-pop with strong hip-hop influences. Lali herself highlighted how this mix of genres was relatively uncommon in the Argentine music scene at the time. Produced by the team at 3musica, the track carries an uplifting message, as the singer said: "it’s about letting go, dancing, and being happy".

She also noted that bringing this kind of sound to Argentina was a challenge she was eager to take on—not only because few local artists were exploring it, but also because it "aligned with her own musical instincts". Lali referred to the track as the most authentic expression of who she was as an artist, designed for enjoyment and connection with her audience.

== Music video ==
The music video for "A Bailar" was released on Lali's YouTube channel on 5 September 2013. Taking full creative control, Lali assembled her own team of editors and producers to develop the visual concept for her first solo single. In an interview with Gente, Lali described the video as a representation of her personal and artistic growth. She explained that going solo had made her feel more independent and responsible for the outcome of her work, adding: "If something turns out bad, it's going to be my fault too". The experience of producing her first video was, in her words, "a beautiful kind of madness".

== Reception ==
"A Bailar" was met with enthusiasm from Lali's fanbase, who had followed her since her early television and music projects. Her debut solo performance drew a large audience both in person and online, and was attended by several celebrities and close friends from the entertainment industry. The show featured live musicians and dancers, showcasing the singer's dynamic stage presence and energy. The single was seen as a key step in her transition from teen actress to pop artist, establishing her as a performer with a clear creative vision and distinct musical identity.

== Live performances ==
Lali gave her first live performance of "A Bailar" during her solo debut show at La Trastienda Club in Buenos Aires on 2 September 2013. On 15 March 2014, Lali included the song in her setlist at the Emozione Festival in Caserta, Italy. "A Bailar" was also featured as part of the setlist for her international concert series, the A Bailar Tour.

The song made its television debut on 11 October 2013, when she performed it on Disney Channel's The U-Mix Show. In 2014, she performed it at that year's edition of Un Sol Para Los Chicos and during the ninth edition of Bailando por un Sueño. In 2015, she returned to the stage of Bailando to perform "A Bailar" during the season finale of its tenth edition. The song remained a staple in her repertoire and was performed at the 2016 edition of Un Sol Para Los Chicos and on Laten Argentinos the same year.

== Formats and track listings ==
Digital download
No.	Title	Length
1.	"A Bailar"	2:52

Digital EP
No.	Title	Length
1.	"A Bailar"	2:52
2.	"Del Otro Lado"	3:41
3.	"Asesina"	3:30

== Awards and nominations ==
For the 2014 Quiero Awards, the song won in the category of Best Female Video and received a nomination for Best Pop Video. It also won the award for Favorite Song at the 2014 Kids' Choice Awards Argentina.

Awards and nominations for "A Bailar"
Year	Organization	Award	Result
2014	Kids' Choice Awards Argentina	Favorite Song	Won
2014	Quiero Awards	Best Female Video	Won
2014	Quiero Awards	Best Pop Video	Nominated
