= List of awards and nominations received by Lali Espósito =

Lali Espósito awards and nominations
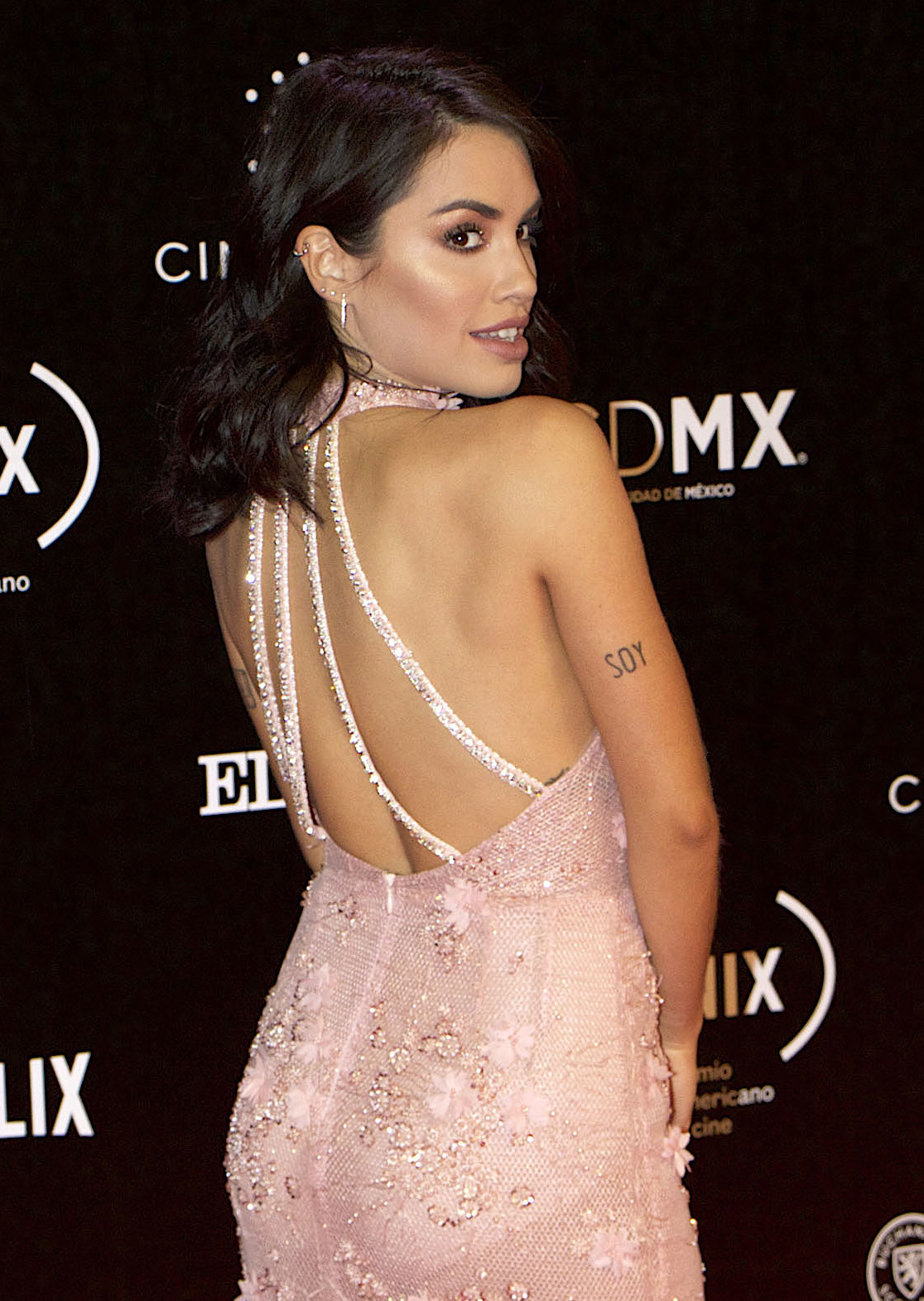
Awards and nominations
Award	Wins	Nominations
Billboard Latin Music Awards	1	2
Boombastic Awards	0	1
Buenos Aires Music Video Fest	6	15
Gardel Awards	13	33
Heat Latin Music Awards	1	6
Kids Choice Awards	1	5
Kids' Choice Awards Argentina	13	18
Kids' Choice Awards Mexico	1	0
Latin American Music Awards	0	1
Lo Nuestro Awards	0	2
Martin Fierro Awards	2	4
MTV Europe Music Awards	6	7
MTV Millennial Awards	7	15
MTV Millennial Awards Brazil	0	1
Premios Cilsa	1	0
Premios Juventud	0	5
Quiero Awards	9	37
Produ Awards	0	4
Tato Awards	1	3
Tu Música Urbano Awards	0	1
Tudo Information Awards	0	1
SEC Awards	1	3
Seoul International Drama Awards	0	1
Silver Condor Awards	0	1
Silver Condor Series Awards	2	4
Video Prisma Awards	7	28
Viña del Mar International Song Festival	3	1
- Totals
Awards won	76
Pending	1
Nominations	292

The following is a list of Argentine actress and singer Lali Espósito's awards and nominations. As of May 2024, Espósito has won 107 awards from 269 nominations.

== Africa Golden Awards ==
Year	Category	Nominated work	Result	Ref.
2025	Most Influential South American Artist in África	Lali	Nominated	

== Billboard Latin Music Awards ==
The Billboard Latin Music Awards are presented annually by Billboard magazine and recognize outstanding chart performances.

Year	Category	Nominated work	Result	Ref.
2019	Social Artist of the Year	Lali	Nominated	
2020	Social Artist of the Year	Lali	Won	

== Boombastic Awards ==
Presented by Mediapro and Boombastic Festival, the awards recognize the best Spanish and international acts.

Year	Category	Nominated work	Result	Ref.
2023	Best Tour	Disciplina Tour	Nominated	

== BreakTudo Awards ==
Year	Category	Nominated work	Result	Ref.
2018	Latin Artist	Lali	Nominated	
2019	Latin Artist	Lali	Won	
2020	Latin Artist	Lali	Nominated	
2020	Latin Hit	"Lo Que Tengo Yo"	Nominated	
2021	Latin Artist	Lali	Won	
2022	Latin Artist	Lali	Nominated	-
2023	International Crush	Lali	Nominated	
2025	Global Artist	Lali	Nominated	
2025	Latin Hit	"Mejor Que Vos"	Nominated	

== Gardel Awards ==
The Gardel Awards are presented annually by CAPIF. The awards are the Argentine equivalent of American Grammy Awards and British BRIT Awards. Espósito has won ten awards.

Year	Category	Nominated work	Result	Ref.
2015	Best New Pop Artist Album	A Bailar	Won	
2015	Best Female Pop Album	A Bailar	Won	
2016	Best Soundtrack Album	Esperanza Mía	Nominated	
2017	Best Female Pop Album	Soy	Nominated	
2017	Song of the Year	"Soy"	Nominated	
2019	Song of the Year	"Sin Querer Queriendo"	Won	
2019	Best Female Pop Album	Brava	Won	
2019	Best Cover Design	Brava	Won	
2020	Collaboration of the Year	"Como Así"	Nominated	
2021	Collaboration of the Year	"Gente en la Calle"	Nominated	
2021	Best Pop Album	Libra	Nominated	
2021	Song of the Year	"Ladrón"	Won	
2023	Best Music Video	"Disciplina"	Won	
2024	Best Music Video	"Quiénes Son?"	Won	
2024	Album of the Year	Lali	Nominated	
2024	Best Pop Album	Lali	Won	
2024	Producer of the Year	Lali	Nominated	
2024	Song of the Year	"Obsesión"	Won	
2024	Record of the Year	"Obsesión"	Nominated	
2024	Best Pop Song	"Obsesión"	Nominated	
2025	Best Pop Song	"Fanático"	Won	
2025	Song of the Year	"Fanático"	Won	
2025	Best Music Video	"Fanático"	Won	
2026	Album of the Year	No Vayas a Atender Cuando el Demonio Llama	Nominated	
2026	Best Pop Album	No Vayas a Atender Cuando el Demonio Llama	Won	
2026	Best Long Form Music Video	No Vayas a Atender Cuando el Demonio Llama	Nominated	
2026	Song of the Year	"Mejor Que Vos"	Nominated	
2026	Record of the Year	"Mejor Que Vos"	Nominated	
2026	Best Pop Song	"Mejor Que Vos"	Won	
2026	Collaboration of the Year	"Mejor Que Vos"	Nominated	
2026	Collaboration of the Year	"Loco Un Poco"	Nominated	
2026	Best Pop/Rock Song	"33"	Nominated	
2026	Best Live Song	"Fanático (En Vivo)"	Nominated	

== Heat Latin Music Awards ==
The Heat Latin Music Awards are presented annually by HTV to reward the best of Latin music.

Year	Category	Nominated work	Result	Ref.
2017	Best Female Artist	Lali	Nominated	
2017	Best Pop Artist	Lali	Nominated	
2017	Best Artist Southern Region	Lali	Won	
2019	Best Artist Southern Region	Lali	Nominated	
2020	Best Video	"Lindo Pero Bruto"	Nominated	
2023	Best Pop Artist	Lali	Nominated	

== Latin American Music Awards ==
The Latin American Music Awards or Latin AMAs is an annual American music award that is presented by Telemundo to award outstanding achievements for artists in the Latin music industry. It is the Spanish-language counterpart of the American Music Awards (AMAs).

Year	Category	Nominated work	Result	Ref.
2021	Social Artist of the Year	Lali	Nominated	

== Lo Nuestro Awards ==
The Lo Nuestro Awards are awarded annually by Univision.

Year	Category	Nominated work	Result	Ref.
2019	Remix of the Year	"Mi Mala (Remix)"	Nominated	
2021	Pop Collaboration of the Year	"Como Así"	Nominated	

== Martin Fierro Awards ==
The Martin Fierro Awards are awarded annually by APTRA. Espósito has won one of two nominations.

Year	Category	Nominated work	Result	Ref.
2016	Best Actress in Daily Fiction	Esperanza mía	Nominated	
2016	Best Theme Song	"Tengo Esperanza"	Won	
2022	Best Judging	La Voz Argentina (with Ricardo Montaner, Soledad and Mau y Ricky)	Won	
2026	Best Judging	La Voz Argentina (with Soledad, Miranda! and Luck Ra)	Nominated	

=== Martín Fierro Film & Series Awards ===
Year	Category	Nominated work	Result	Ref.
2025	Best Supporting Actress in Film	Verano Trippin	Nominated	
2025	Best Lead Actress in a Series	El Fin del Amor	Nominated	
2025	Best Original Music	"El Fin del Amor"	Nominated	

=== Martín Fierro Fashion Awards ===
Year	Category	Nominated work	Result	Ref.
2023	Most Stylish Musician	Lali Espósito	Won	
2023	Most Stylish TV Judge	La Voz Argentina	Nominated	
2026	Most Stylish Female in Big Show	La Voz Argentina	Nominated	

=== Martín Fierro Music Award ===
Year	Category	Nominated work	Result	Ref.
2026	Best Female Artist	Lali	Nominated	
2026	Best Pop Artist	Lali	Won	
2026	Best Visual Concept	Lali	Nominated	
2026	Best Album	No Vayas a Atender Cuando el Demonio Llama	Nominated	
2026	Best Collaboration	"Loco Un Poco"	Won	
2026	Best Live Show	Lali Tour 2025	Nominated	

== MTV Awards ==
=== MTV Europe Music Awards ===
The MTV Europe Music Awards was established in 1994 by MTV Europe to award the music videos from European and international artists. Espósito has won Five times.

Year	Category	Nominated work	Result	Ref.
2016	Best Latin America South Act	Lali	Won	
2017	Best Latin America South Act	Lali	Won	
2017	Best Worldwide Act	Lali	Won	
2018	Best Latin America South Act	Lali	Won	
2019	Best Latin America South Act	Lali	Nominated	
2020	Best Latin America South Act	Lali	Won	
2023	Best Latin America South Act	Lali	Won	

=== MTV Millennial Awards ===
The MTV Millennial Awards or MTV MIAWs, held annually in Mexico, were established in 2013 by MTV Latin America to award music artists. Espósito has won seven awards from fifteen nominations.

Year	Category	Nominated work	Result	Ref.
2014	Argentine Twittstar of the Year	Lali	Won	
2015	Argentine Instagramer of the Year	Lali	Won	
2015	Dubsmash Celebrity	Lali	Won	
2016	Best Performance in an App	Lali	Nominated	
2016	Instacrush	Lali	Nominated	
2016	Best Pop Artist	Lali	Nominated	
2016	Argentine Artist of the Year	Lali	Won	
2017	Argentine Artist of the Year	Lali	Won	
2017	Video of the Year	"Ego"	Won	
2017	Best Pop Artist	Lali	Nominated	
2017	Argentine Instagrammer of the Year	Lali	Nominated	
2018	Argentine Instagrammer of the Year	Lali	Nominated	
2018	Argentine Artist of the Year	Lali	Nominated	
2019	Argentine Artist of the Year	Lali	Won	
2019	Argentine Instagrammer of the Year	Lali	Nominated	

=== MTV Millennial Awards Brazil ===
The MTV Millennial Awards Brazil or MTV MIAWs BR, held annually in Brazil, were established in 2018 by MTV Brasil to celebrate music, television and internet artists.

Year	Category	Nominated work	Result	Ref.
2022	¡Me Gusta!	Lali	Nominated	

== Nickelodeon Kids Choice Awards ==
The Nickelodeon Kids' Choice Awards is an annual award show launched by Nickelodeon. Espósito has won one award from five nominations.

Year	Category	Nominated work	Result	Ref.
2014	Favorite Latin Star	Lali	Won	
2015	Favorite Latin Star	Lali	Nominated	
2016	Favorite Latin Star	Lali	Nominated	
2017	Favorite Latin Star	Lali	Nominated	
2020	Best Latin Fandom	Lalitas	Nominated	

=== Kids' Choice Awards Argentina ===
The Kids' Choice Awards Argentina was an annual award show launched by Nickelodeon Latin America. Espósito has won thirteen awards from eighteen nominations.

Year	Category	Nominated work	Result	Ref.
2013	Favorite Actress	Solamente vos	Won	
2013	Celebrity on Twitter	Lali	Won	
2014	Celebrity on Twitter	Lali	Nominated	
2014	Favorite Song	"A Bailar"	Won	
2014	Favorite Artist	Lali	Won	
2015	Favorite Artist	Lali	Won	
2015	Favorite Actress	Esperanza mía	Won	
2015	Favorite Song	"Mil Años Luz"	Won	
2015	Favorite Song	"Tengo Esperanza"	Nominated	
2016	Favorite Artist	Lali	Won	
2016	Trendy Girl	Lali	Nominated	
2016	Favorite Latin Song	"Soy"	Won	
2017	Favorite Latin Song	"Una Na"	Won	
2017	Best Fandom	Lalitas	Nominated	
2017	Favorite Artist	Lali	Won	
2018	Favorite Artist	Lali	Won	
2018	Favorite Song	"100 Grados"	Won	
2018	Best Fandom	Lalitas	Nominated	

=== Kids' Choice Awards Mexico ===
The Kids' Choice Awards Mexico is an annual award show launched by Nickelodeon Latin America.

Year	Category	Nominated work	Result	Ref.
2022	Favorite Argentine Artist	Lali	Won	

== Platino Awards ==
The Platino Awards, known in Spanish as Premios Platino del Cine Iberoamericano, are Ibero-America's annual film awards. They honor excellence in cinematic achievements.

Year	Category	Nominated work	Result	Ref.
2019	Best Actress	The Accused	Proposed	
2023	Best Actress in a Miniseries or TV series	El Fin del Amor	Proposed	

== Premios Cilsa ==
The Cilsa Awards are special awards presented by CILSA to honor celebrities that fight for a better world working selflessly with non-profit institutions. Espósito has won one award.

Year	Category	Nominated work	Result	Ref.
2016	Committed Solidary Citizen	—	Won	

== Premios Juventud ==
The Premios Juventud are awarded annually by Univision to honor pop culture of young Hispanic and Latino Americans.

Year	Category	Nominated work	Result	Ref.
2019	Best New Artist	Lali	Nominated	
2019	Best Choreography	"Caliente"	Nominated	
2019	Best Behind the Scenes	"Lindo Pero Bruto"	Nominated	
2020	Best Quarantine Song	"Color Esperanza 2020"	Nominated	
2022	Best Choreography	"Disciplina"	Nominated	
2023	Best Pop Collaboration	"Una Vez Más"	Nominated	
2023	Favorite Trendsetter	Lali	Nominated	

== Produ Awards ==
The Produ Awards are awarded annually by PRODU to honor to the best television productions in all of Latin America

Year	Category	Nominated work	Result	Ref.
2019	Best TV Host	Talento FOX	Nominated	
2023	Best Actress in a Drama Series or Miniseries	El Fin del Amor	Nominated	
2023	Best Live Event	Disciplina Tour Live from Buenos Aires	Nominated	
2025	Best Leading Actress in a Drama	El Fin del Amor (T.2)	Nominated	

== Premios Quiero ==
The Premios Quiero are awarded by Argentine TV channel "Quiero TV" to prize music artists. Lali has won nine awards from thirty-five nominations.

Year	Category	Nominated work	Result	Ref.
2014	Best Female Video	"A Bailar"	Won	
2014	Best Pop Video	"A Bailar"	Nominated	
2014	Best Choreography	"Asesina"	Won	
2015	Best Choreography	"Mil Años Luz"	Nominated	
2015	Best Pop Video	"Histeria"	Nominated	
2015	Best Female Video	"Del Otro Lado"	Won	
2016	Best Female Video	"Soy"	Won	
2016	Video of The Year	"Soy"	Nominated	
2016	Best Instagram Artist Video	"Soy"	Nominated	
2016	Best Collaboration	"Mueve" (with Abraham Mateo)	Nominated	
2016	Best Choreography	"Boomerang"	Won	
2017	Best Instagram Artist Video	"Boomerang"	Nominated	
2017	Best Direction	"Ego"	Nominated	
2017	Best Female Video	"Ego"	Nominated	
2017	Best Ballad Video	"Ego"	Won	
2017	Video of The Year	"Ego"	Nominated	
2018	Video of The Year	"100 Grados"	Nominated	
2018	Best Pop Video	"100 Grados"	Nominated	
2018	Best Instagram Artist Video	"100 Grados"	Nominated	
2018	Best Collaboration	"Mi Mala (Remix)"	Won	
2018	Best Female Video	"Una Na"	Nominated	
2019	Best Female Video	"Sin Querer Queriendo"	Nominated	
2019	Best Video Guest Appearance	"¿Qué Vas a Hacer?" (with J Balvin)	Won	
2019	Best Choreography	"Somos Amantes"	Won	
2020	Best Choreography	"Lo Que Tengo Yo"	Nominated	
2020	Video of The Year	"Lo Que Tengo Yo"	Nominated	
2020	Best Female Video	"Lo Que Tengo Yo"	Nominated	
2020	Best Pop Video	"Como Así"	Nominated	
2020	Best Homemade Video	"Color Esperanza 2020"	Nominated	
2021	Best Party Video	"Color Esperanza 2020"	Nominated	
2021	Best Rock Video	"Gente en la Calle" (with Fito Páez)	Nominated	
2021	Best Melodic Video	"Soy de Volar" (with Dvicio)	Nominated	
2022	Video of The Year	"Disciplina"	Nominated	
2022	Best Female Video	"Disciplina"	Nominated	
2022	Best Instagram Artist Video	"N5"	Nominated	
2023	Best Female Video	"Quienes Son?"	Pending	
2023	Best Pop Video	"Obsesión"	Pending	

== Tato Awards ==
The Tato Awards are an Argentine awards for television, released by CAPIT since 2009. Espósito has won one award from three nominations.

Year	Category	Nominated work	Result	Ref.
2013	Best Supporting Actress	Solamente vos	Nominated	
2015	Best Actress	Esperanza mía	Won	
2015	Best Theme Song	"Tengo Esperanza"	Nominated	

== Tu Música Urbano Awards ==
The Tu Música Urbano Awards are presented annually by the Telemundo.

Year	Category	Nominated work	Result	Ref.
2020	Top New Female Artist	Lali	Nominated	

== Tudo Information Awards ==
The Tudo Information Award is a Brazilian award show held annually by Tudo Information, a news and entertainment website.

Year	Category	Nominated work	Result	Ref.
2020	Feat of the Year	"Como Así" (with CNCO)	Nominated	

== SEC Awards ==
The SEC Awards are awarded annually by Brazilian news site Séries em Cena to the best of the film, television and music industry in Brazil.

Year	Category	Nominated work	Result	Ref.
2021	Best Actress in Action Series	Sky Rojo	Won	
2022	Best Latin Artist of Year	Lali	Nominated	
2023	Latin Music Artist of the Year	Lali	Nominated	

== Seoul International Drama Awards ==
The Seoul International Drama Awards is an annual award show for excellence in television drama production based in Seoul, South Korea. For the 2016 ceremony, Espósito received one nomination.

Year	Category	Nominated work	Result	Ref.
2016	Best Actress	Esperanza mia	Nominated	

== Silver Condor Awards ==
The Silver Condor Awards (Spanish: "Premios Cóndor de Plata") are presented annually by the Argentine Film Critics Association (ACCA). The awards are the Argentine equivalent of American Academy Awards.

Year	Category	Nominated work	Result	Ref.
2017	Best New Actress	That's Not Cheating	Nominated	

=== Silver Condor Series Awards ===
In 2022, the ACCA announced that they would be awarding not only film but series excellency.

Year	Category	Nominated work	Result	Ref.
2023	Best Lead Actress in a Comedy or Musical Series	El Fin del Amor	Won	
2023	Best Theme Song	"Bailarás"	Won	
2026	Best lead actress in a series	El Fin del Amor	Pending	
2026	Best song for a series	"El Fin Del Amor"	Pending	

== Video Prisma Awards ==
Year	Category	Nominated work	Result	Ref.
2022	Favorite Video	"Disciplina"	Won	
2022	Best Choreography	"Disciplina"	Won	
2022	Best Behind-the-Scenes Video	"Disciplina"	Nominated	
2022	Best Pop Video	"N5"	Nominated	
2022	Video of the Year	"2 Son 3"	Nominated	
2022	Best Sci-Fi Video	"2 Son 3"	Won	
2022	Best Video	"Como Tú"	Nominated	
2023	Best Art Direction	"Yo Te Diré" (with Miranda!)	Won	
2023	Video of the Year	"Yo Te Diré" (with Miranda!)	Nominated	
2023	Video of the Year	"Cómprame un Brishito"	Nominated	
2023	Best Pop Video	"Cómprame un Brishito"	Nominated	
2023	Best Choreography	"Cómprame un Brishito"	Won	
2023	Best Styling	"Cómprame un Brishito"	Nominated	
2023	Best Making Of Video	"Cómprame un Brishito"	Nominated	
2023	Favorite video	"Quiénes Son?"	Won	
2024	Video of the Year	Mi Fiesta	Nominated	
2024	Best Direction	Mi Fiesta	Nominated	
2024	Best Photography Direction	Mi Fiesta	Nominated	
2024	Best Costume Design	Mi Fiesta	Nominated	
2024	Best Choreography	Mi Fiesta	Nominated	
2024	Best Choreography	"S.O.S" (with Taichu)	Nominated	
2026	Best Choreography	"Plástico"	Nominated	
2026	Video of the Year	"Fanático"	Nominated	
2026	Best Video	"Fanático"	Nominated	
2026	Best Direction	"Fanático"	Nominated	
2026	Best Pop Video	"Mejor Que Vos"	Nominated	
2026	Best Creative Direction	No Vayas A Atender Cuando El Demonio Llama	Nominated	
2026	Long Format Video	No Vayas A Atender Cuando El Demonio Llama	Won	

== Viña del Mar International Song Festival ==
The Viña del Mar International Song Festival is a music festival that has been held annually during the 3rd week of February in Viña del Mar, Chile. Started in 1960, it is the oldest and largest music festival in Latin America.

Year	Category	Nominated work	Result	Ref.
2017	Gaviota de Plata	Festival Artist	Won	
2017	Gaviota de Oro	Festival Artist	Won	
2017	Most Popular Artist	Festival Artist	Won	
2017	Reina del Monstruo	Lali	Nominated	

== Popularity charts ==
Year	Ranking	Presented by	Rank	Ref.
—N/a	Social 50	Billboard	2nd	
—N/a	Artist 100	Billboard	69th	
2014	The 25 sexiest women of Argentina	The Ranking	3rd	
2014	The 100 most influential Twitter accounts in Spanish	Topsy Pro	27th	
2015	The 10 most influential women of Argentina	Infobae	7th	
2016	The 100 most influential people for Argentines	Giacobbe & Asociados	52nd	
2016	Top Argentine Influencers	Hill+Knowlton Strategies	4th	
2016	Social 50 (Year-End)	Billboard	23rd	
2017	Social 50 (Year-End)	Billboard	21st	
2018	Social 50 (Year-End)	Billboard	36th	
2019	Social 50 (Year-End)	Billboard	22nd	
2020	Social 50 (Year-End)	Billboard	41st	
2010s	Social 50 (Decade-End)	Billboard	42nd	
