= Lali discography =

Argentine singer discography

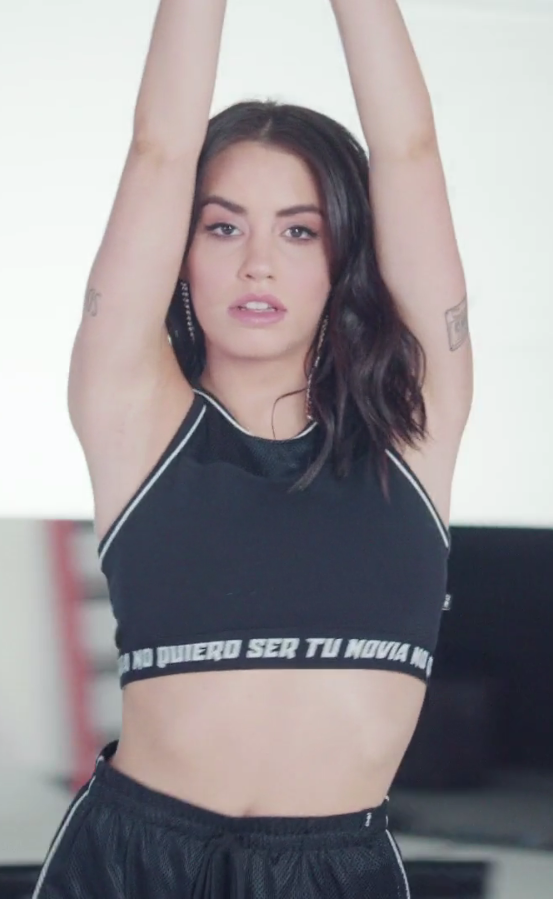
- Lali in 2018
- Studio albums: 6
- EPs: 2
- Soundtrack albums: 1
- Live albums: 2
- Singles: 64
- Promotional singles: 16
- Collaborative albums: 1

Argentine singer Lali has released six studio albums, one collaborative album, two extended plays, two live albums, one soundtrack album, 64 singles (including 15 as a featured artist and three charity singles) and 16 promotional singles. She first appeared on the track "No Digas Nada" for the Rincón de Luz soundtrack in 2003. From 2007 to 2012, Lali was part of the pop group Teen Angels, derived from the television series Casi Ángeles. The group recorded five studio albums, two compilation albums, three live albums, and sixteen singles, with their albums receiving gold and platinum certifications in Argentina and Spain. In 2013, one year after the group's disbandment, Lali announced her solo career.

Lali's debut album, A Bailar, was released on 21 March 2014. The album peaked at number one in Argentina and number three in Uruguay. It spawned five singles: "A Bailar", "Asesina", "Mil Años Luz", "Del Otro Lado" and "Histeria". In December 2014, Lali signed a music deal with Sony Music Argentina and released a limited deluxe edition of the album titled A Bailar: Edición Fanpack. Shortly after, the album received a gold certification from the Argentine Chamber of Phonograms and Videograms Producers (CAPIF) for selling 20,000 copies. At the 17th Annual Premios Gardel, the album won in the categories of Best Female Pop Album and Best New Artist.

In 2015, Lali appeared on nine of the eleven tracks of the Esperanza Mía soundtrack, which debuted at number one in both Argentina and Uruguay and received a platinum certification from CAPIF.

"Unico", originally intended to be the lead single from Lali's second album Soy, was released on 20 March 2016. However, the album's title track, "Soy", replaced "Unico" as the lead single and was released on 5 May 2016. The album itself was released on 20 May 2016, and was certified gold by CAPIF just a few hours after its release. Soy reached the top position on the charts in four countries: Argentina, Israel, Venezuela, and Uruguay, and also entered the top ten in Spain and Italy. Two more singles were released from the album: "Boomerang" and "Ego", with "Ego" becoming Lali's debut single in the United States and Puerto Rico. The album was later certified gold by the Uruguayan Chamber of Disc (CUD) for selling over 2,000 copies.

Her third studio album, Brava, was released on 10 August 2018. The album debuted at number two in Argentina and was certified four times platinum by CAPIF. It was preceded by the singles "Una Na", "Tu Novia," "100 Grados", and "Besarte Mucho". In February 2018, Lali collaborated with Mau y Ricky, Karol G, Becky G, and Leslie Grace on the remix of "Mi Mala", which received a triple platinum Latin certification from the Recording Industry Association of America (RIAA). She teamed up with Mau y Ricky again for the album's fifth single, "Sin Querer Queriendo", which peaked at No. 14 on the Billboard Argentina Hot 100. In 2019, Lali joined Thalía on their single "Lindo Pero Bruto", which peaked at number 32 on the Billboard Latin Pop Songs chart and was certified gold by the RIAA. The final singles from Brava were the Pabllo Vittar-assisted track "Caliente", which received a gold certification in Brazil, and "Somos Amantes".

In late 2019, Lali kicked off her fourth era with the releases of "Laligera" and "Como Así" (featuring boyband CNCO), which peaked at number 24 and 33, respectively, on the Billboard Argentina Hot 100. In 2020, these singles were followed by "Lo Que Tengo Yo" and "Fascinada". She also featured on songs by Pinto "Wahin", Fito Páez, Los Ángeles Azules, and Dvicio. In November 2020, Lali released her fourth studio album, Libra, along with its fifth single, "Ladrón", in collaboration with Argentine trap singer Cazzu. The album debuted at the top of the Argentine albums chart.

After a year away from the music scene, Lali finally made her return with the triple release of "Disciplina", "Diva" and "Como Tú" between January and February 2022. In June, Lali released "N5", with which she earned her first top-ten entry on the Billboard Argentina Hot 100 and her first solo gold certification by CAPIF. Between August 2022 and April 2023, Lali released the singles "2 Son 3", "Motiveishon", "Cómpreme un Brishito" and "Obsesión". The eight tracks were included on Lali, the artist's fifth studio album. The record debuted at the number one position in Argentina and Uruguay. At the 26th Annual Premios Gardel, Lali won Best Pop Album, Song of the Year, and Best Music Video. The album was additionally nominated for Album of the Year.

== Albums ==
=== Studio albums ===
List of studio albums, with selected details, chart positions, and certifications
Title	Studio album details	Peak chart positions							Certifications
Title	Studio album details	ARG	ISL	ITA	MEX	SPA	URU	VEN	Certifications
A Bailar	Released: 21 March 2014 (ARG); Label: Self-released, (Note: A Bailar was originally released as an independent project on 21 March 2014 and later re-released on 9 December 2014 by Sony Music Argentina.) Sony Argentina; Formats: CD, CD/DVD, digital download, streaming	1	15	—	—	—	3	—	CAPIF: Gold
Soy	Released: 20 May 2016 (ARG); Label: Sony Argentina, Ariola; Formats: CD, LP, digital download, streaming	1	1	5	11	6	1	1	CAPIF: Gold; CUD: Gold
Brava	Released: 10 August 2018; Label: Sony Argentina; Formats: CD, digital download, streaming	2	*	—	—	—	3	—	CAPIF: 4× Platinum
Libra	Released: 12 November 2020; Label: Sony Argentina; Formats: CD, digital download, streaming	1	*	—	*	—	16	*	
Lali	Released: 13 April 2023; Label: Sony Argentina; Formats: CD, LP, digital download, streaming	1	*	—	*	—	1	*	
No Vayas a Atender Cuando el Demonio Llama	Released: 29 April 2025; Label: Sony Argentina; Formats: CD, LP, digital download, streaming	1	*	—	*	—	*	*	CAPIF: Platinum
"—" denotes a recording that did not chart or was not released in that territory; "*" denotes the chart did not exist at that time.

=== Collaborative albums ===
List of collaborative albums with selected details
Title	Studio album details	Peaks
Title	Studio album details	ARG
Bailar o Morir (with Miranda! as BOM)	Released: 3 November 2026; Label: Sony Argentina; Formats: CD, LP, casette, digital download, streaming	1

=== Live albums ===
List of live albums, with selected details
Title	Live album details
En Vivo en la Trastienda	Released: 3 February 2015; Label: Hook; Formats: Streaming
Lali en Vivo	Released: 16 March 2016; Label: RCA Victor; Formats: Streaming

=== Soundtracks ===
List of soundtrack albums, with selected details, chart positions, and certifications
Title	Soundtrack details	Peak chart positions		Certifications
Title	Soundtrack details	ARG	URU	Certifications
Esperanza Mía	Released: 19 May 2015 (ARG); Label: Sony Argentina; Formats: CD, digital download, streaming	1	1	CAPIF: Platinum

== Extended plays ==
List of EPs, with selected details
Title	Extended play details
A Bailar	Released: 11 March 2014; Label: Self-released; Format: Streaming
Spotify Singles	Released: 31 August 2023; Label: Sony Argentina; Format: Streaming

== Singles ==
=== As lead artist ===
List of singles as lead artist, showing selected chart positions, certifications, and associated albums
Title	Year	Peak chart positions										Certifications	Album
Title	Year	ARG	CHL	ECU	MEX	PAN	PAR	PER	URU	US Latin Pop	VEN	Certifications	Album
"A Bailar"	2013	—	—	—	—	—	—	—	—	—	—		A Bailar
"Asesina"	2014	—	—	—	—	—	—	—	—	—	—		A Bailar
"Mil Años Luz"	2014	—	—	—	—	—	—	—	—	—	—		A Bailar
"Del Otro Lado"	2015	—	—	—	—	—	—	—	—	—	—		A Bailar
"Histeria"	2015	— (Note: "Histeria" did not enter the Billboard Argentina Hot 100, but it peaked at number two on the Media Forest Argentine National Songs chart.)	—	—	—	—	—	—	—	—	—		A Bailar
"Soy"	2016	— (Note: "Soy" did not enter the Billboard Argentina Hot 100, but peaked at number 5 on the Monitor Latino Argentina National Songs chart.)	—	15	—	—	—	—	—	—	—		Soy
"Boomerang"	2016	—	—	—	—	—	—	—	—	—	—		Soy
"Ego"	2016	— (Note: "Ego" did not enter the Billboard Argentina Hot 100, but peaked at number 15 on the Monitor Latino Latin Airplay chart, and at number 4 on the National Songs chart.)	—	—	—	69	—	—	—	—	49		Soy
"Una Na"	2017	11	—	89	— (Note: "Una Na" did not enter the Billboard Mexico Airplay chart, but peaked at number 34 on the Mexico Espanol Airplay chart.)	94	—	—	8	—	— (Note: "Una Na" did not enter the Venezuela Top 20 Airplay chart, but peaked at number 98 on the Venezuela Year-End Top 100 Pop Airplay chart.)		Brava
"Tu Novia"	2017	—	—	—	—	—	—	—	— (Note: "Tu Novia" did not enter the Monitor Latino Uruguayan Airplay chart, but peaked at number 16 on the Uruguayan Latin Airplay chart.)	—	—		Brava
"100 Grados" (featuring A. Chal)	2018	19	—	53	38	75	8	—	8	—	—		Brava
"Besarte Mucho"	2018	53	—	—	—	—	—	—	—	—	—		Brava
"Sin Querer Queriendo" (Note: "Sin Querer Queriendo" also appears on Mau y Ricky's debut studio album Para Aventuras y Curiosidades.) (featuring Mau y Ricky)	2018	14	17	87	—	—	16	—	13	—	—		Brava
"Caliente" (featuring Pabllo Vittar)	2018	51	—	—	—	—	—	—	—	—	—	PMB: Gold	Brava
"Lindo Pero Bruto" (with Thalía)	2019	21	—	64	— (Note: "Lindo Pero Bruto" did not enter the Billboard Mexico Airplay chart, but peaked at number 14 on the Mexico Espanol Airplay chart.)	—	—	—	—	32	— (Note: "Lindo Pero Bruto" did not enter the Venezuela Top 20 Airplay chart, but peaked at number 18 on the Venezuela Top 20 Pop Airplay chart.)	AMPROFON: Platinum; RIAA: Gold (Latin)	Valiente
"Somos Amantes"	2019	56	—	—	—	—	—	—	—	—	—		Brava
"Laligera"	2019	24	—	—	—	—	—	—	—	—	—		Libra
"Como Así" (featuring CNCO)	2019	33	12	14	—	16	14	15	— (Note: "Como Así" did not enter the Monitor Latino Uruguayan Airplay chart, but peaked at number 15 on the Uruguayan Latin Airplay chart.)	—	—		Libra
"Lo Que Tengo Yo"	2020	28	—	—	—	—	—	—	— (Note: "Lo Que Tengo Yo" did not enter the Monitor Latino Uruguayan Airplay chart, but peaked at number 16 on the Uruguayan Latin Airplay chart.)	—	—		Libra
"Fascinada"	2020	73	—	—	—	—	15	—	9	—	—		Libra
"Soy de Volar" (with Dvicio)	2020	80	—	—	—	—	—	—	—	—	—	PROMUSICAE: Gold	Impulso
"Ladrón" (with Cazzu)	2020	37	—	—	—	—	—	—	—	—	—		Libra
"Disciplina"	2022	34	—	—	—	—	—	—	—	—	—		Lali
"Diva"	2022	80	—	—	—	—	—	—	—	—	—		Lali
"Como Tú"	2022	62	—	—	—	—	—	—	—	—	—		Lali
"Solo" (with Willy William and will.i.am)	2022	—	—	—	—	—	—	—	—	—	—		Non-album single
"N5"	2022	9	16	—	—	—	—	14	6	—	—	CAPIF: Gold	Lali
"2 Son 3"	2022	35	—	—	—	—	—	—	12	—	—		Lali
"Quiero Todo" (with Soledad and Natalia Oreiro)	2022	97	—	—	—	—	—	—	16	—	—		Non-album single
"Motiveishon"	2022	48	—	—	—	—	—	—	—	—	—		Lali
"Yo Te Diré" (with Miranda!)	2023	26	—	—	—	—	—	—	— (Note: "Yo Te Diré" did not enter the Uruguay Top 20 Airplay chart, but peaked at number 99 on the Uruguay Year-End Top 100 Pop Airplay chart.)	—	— (Note: "Yo Te Diré" did not enter the Venezuela Top 20 Airplay chart, but peaked at number 78 on the Venezuela Year-End Top 100 Pop Airplay chart.)		Hotel Miranda!
"Una Vez Más" (with Pedro Capó)	2023	—	—	—	—	17	—	11	—	7	—		La Neta
"Cómprame un Brishito"	2023	69	—	—	—	—	—	—	—	—	—		Lali
"Obsesión"	2023	20	—	—	—	—	13	—	16	—	—		Lali
"Nochentera (Remix)" (with Vicco)	2023	— (Note: "Nochentera" did not enter the Billboard Argentina Hot 100, but peaked at number 15 on the Argentina Airplay chart.)	—	—	—	—	16	13	—	—	—		Noctalgia
"Quiénes Son?"	2023	71	—	—	—	—	—	—	—	—	—		Lali
"Baum Baum"	2023	— (Note: "Baum Baum" did not enter the Billboard Argentina Hot 100, but peaked at number nine on the Argentina Airplay chart.)	—	—	—	—	—	—	—	—	—		Lali
"Mil Horas" (with Cachorro López)	2024	70	—	—	—	—	—	—	—	—	—		Éxtasis Total
"S.O.S" (with Taichu)	2024	—	—	—	—	—	—	—	—	—	—		Non-album single
"Fanático"	2024	5	—	—	—	—	—	—	—	—	—	CAPIF: Platinum	No Vayas a Atender Cuando el Demonio Llama
"No Me Importa"	2024	43	—	—	—	—	—	—	— (Note: "No Me Importa" did not enter the Monitor Latino Uruguay Airplay chart, but peaked at number 15 on the Uruguay Pop Airplay chart.)	—	—		No Vayas a Atender Cuando el Demonio Llama
"Mejor Que Vos" (with Miranda!)	2025	14	—	—	—	—	12	—	7	—	—	CAPIF: Gold	No Vayas a Atender Cuando el Demonio Llama
"33" (with Dillom)	2025	29	17	—	—	—	9	—	— (Note: "33" did not enter the Monitor Latino Uruguay Airplay chart, but peaked at number 14 on the Uruguay Pop Airplay chart.)	—	—		No Vayas a Atender Cuando el Demonio Llama
"Plástico" (with Duki)	2025	25	—	—	—	—	—	16	—	—	—	CAPIF: Gold	No Vayas a Atender Cuando el Demonio Llama
"1 Amor"	2026	18	—	—	—	—	—	—	—	—	—		Spotify Singles
"Bailar o Morir" (with Miranda!) (Note: As BOM.)	2026	10	—	—	—	—	—	—	—	—	—		Bailar o Morir
"En Italia" (with Miranda!)	2026	5	—	—	—	—	—	—	—	—	—		Bailar o Morir
"—" denotes a recording that did not chart or was not released in that territory.

=== As featured artist ===
List of singles as a featured artist, showing selected chart positions, certifications, and associated albums
Title	Year	Peak chart positions										Certifications	Album
Title	Year	ARG	COL	ECU	MEX Pop	PAR	SPA	URU	US Latin	US Latin Pop	VEN	Certifications	Album
"Mueve" (Abraham Mateo featuring Lali)	2016	—	—	—	—	—	—	—	—	—	—		Are You Ready?
"Roma-Bangkok" (Baby K featuring Lali)	2017	—	—	—	—	—	—	100	—	—	—		Non-album single
"Mi Mala (Remix)" (Mau y Ricky and Karol G featuring Lali, Becky G and Leslie Grace)	2018	10	68	15	—	9	57	8	38	21	30	CAPIF: Gold; AMPROFON: Platinum+Gold; PROMUSICAE: Gold; RIAA: 3× Platinum (Latin); UNIMPRO: 4× Platinum	Para Aventuras y Curiosidades
"Prohibido (Remix)" (CD9 featuring Lali and Ana Mena)	2018	—	—	—	16	—	—	—	—	—	—		1.0
"Salta la Comba" (Pinto “Wahin” featuring Lali)	2019	—	—	—	—	—	—	—	—	—	—		Del 13 al 1
"Las Maravillas de la Vida" (Los Ángeles Azules featuring Lali)	2020	—	—	—	—	— (Note: "Las Maravillas de la Vida" did not enter the Paraguay Pop Airplay chart, but peaked at number five on the Paraguay Tropical Airplay chart.)	—	—	—	—	—		De Buenos Aires Para El Mundo
"Gente en la Calle" (Fito Páez featuring Lali)	2021	80	—	—	—	—	—	—	—	—	—		La Conquista del Espacio
"Cuanto Antes" (Álex Ubago featuring Lali)	2022	—	—	—	—	—	—	—	—	—	—		20 Años
"A Oscuras" (Ptazeta featuring Lali)	2024	—	—	—	—	—	—	—	—	—	—		Gorgona
"Loco Un Poco" (Turf featuring Lali)	2025	59	—	—	—	—	—	—	—	—	—		Polvo de Estrellas
"Para Dos" (La Joaqui featuring Lali)	2025	— (Note: "Para Dos" did not enter the Billboard Argentina Hot 100, but peaked at number 16 on the Argentina Pop Airplay chart.)	—	—	—	—	—	—	—	—	—		Non-album single
"FIFA" (Doppel Gangs featuring Lali)	2026	—	—	—	—	—	—	—	—	—	—		Zzzimon
"El Viento Trae Una Copla" (Bersuit Vergarabat featuring Lali)	2026	—	—	—	—	—	—	—	—	—	—		Hijos del Culo – 25 Años
"Miss Universo" (BB Asul featuring Lali)	2026	—	—	—	—	—	—	—	—	—	—		Miss Universo
"Con Vos" (Bajofondo featuring Lali)	2026	—	—	—	—	—	—	—	—	—	—		Ohm (Deluxe)
"—" denotes a recording that did not chart or was not released in that territory.

=== Charity singles ===
List of charity singles showing selected chart positions, certifications, and notes
Title	Year	Peak chart positions										Certifications	Notes
Title	Year	COL	DR	ECU	ESV	HON	NIC	PAN	PAR	URU	US Latin Pop	Certifications	Notes
"La Memoria" (among artists for Memoria AMIA)	2016	—	—	—	—	—	—	—	—	—	—		To commemorate the victims of the 1994 AMIA bombing. (Note: In 2016, the Argentine Israelite Mutual Association gathered one hundred Argentine artists to create a reimagined version of León Gieco's 2001 single "La Memoria" to commemorate the victims of the 1994 AMIA bombing. The list of singers included Lali, Axel, Pedro Aznar, Elena Roger, Gustavo Santaolalla, Litto Nebbia, Nito Mestre, Abel Pintos, Ricardo Mollo, Diego Torres, Andrés Ciro Martínez, Luis Salinas, Juan Carlos Baglietto, Pimpinela, Raúl Lavié, Soledad, Nacha Guevara, Patricia Sosa, Chango Spasiuk, Valeria Lynch and Karina la Princesita, among others.)
"Color Esperanza" (Diego Torres featuring various artists)	2020	11	5	13	19	4	5	11	11	4	21	AMPROFON: 3× Platinum; PROMUSICAE: Platinum	To benefit the Pan American Health Organization's response to the COVID-19 pandemic. (Note: In May 2020, Sony Music Latin and Global Citizen teamed up to release a new version of the 2001 Diego Torres's song "Color Esperanza" to benefit the Pan American Health Organization's (PAHO) response to the COVID-19 pandemic. The track includes vocals by Torres, Lali, Rubén Blades, Mario Domm, Camilo, Pedro Capó, Coti, Dilsinho, El Cigala, Farruko, Fonseca, Kany García, Leonel García, Gente de Zona, Leslie Grace, Nicky Jam, Ara Malikian, Dani Martín, Mau y Ricky, Prince Royce, Rauw Alejandro, Reik, Río Roma, Carlos Rivera, Ivete Sangalo, Thalía, Ángela Torres, Manuel Turizo, Jorge Villamizar and Carlos Vives.)
"Himno a la Alegría" (among various artists)	2021	—	—	—	—	—	—	—	—	—	—	PROMUSICAE: Gold	To bring light and hope during the COVID-19 pandemic. (Note: In April 2021, Sony Music Spain, Universal Music Spain and Warner Music Spain teamed up to release a new version of the 1969 Miguel Ríos's song "Himno a la Alegría" to bring light and hope during the COVID-19 pandemic and to pay tribute to its frontline heroes. The track includes vocals by Ríos, Lali, Aitana, Alejandro Lerner, Alejandro Sanz, Alessia Cara, Alex Ubago, Ana Mena, Andrés Calamaro, Andrés Dvicio, Antonio José, Antonio Orozco, Brian May, Camilo, Carlos Rivera, David Bisbal, Dulce Pontes, Draco, Fher Olvera, India Martínez, Joy, Juanes, Laura Pausini, Leire Martínez, Luis Cobos, Macaco, Malú, Manolo García, Manuel Carrasco, Mau y Ricky, Melendi, Mikel Izal, Nathy Peluso, Pablo Alborán, Pablo López, Rosario, Rozalén, Sebastián Yatra, Vanesa Martín.)
"—" denotes a recording that did not chart or was not released in that territory.

=== Promotional singles ===
List of promotional singles
Title	Year	Album
"Amor de Verdad" (Note: "Amor de Verdad" features uncredited vocals by Zetta Krome.)	2014	A Bailar
"Tengo Esperanza"	2015	Esperanza Mía
"Unico" (Note: "Unico" was originally intended to be the lead single from Soy, but was replaced for the title track "Soy" for unknown reasons.)	2016	Soy
"Firestarter" (Brian Cross featuring Lali)	2016	Darkness to Light
"Tu Revolución"	2016	Soy
"Taste the Feeling"	2017	Non-album promotional singles
"Cuando Estoy Con Vos"	2017	Non-album promotional singles
"Tu Sonrisa"	2017	Brava
"Y Dale Alegría a Mi Corazón"	2018	Non-album promotional singles
"Iguales" (Diego Torres featuring Lali and Wisin)	2018	Non-album promotional singles
"Bailo Pa Mí"	2021	Libra
"Bailarás"	2022	Non-album promotional single
"KO"	2023	Lali
"Corazón Perdido"	2023	Lali
"El Fin del Amor"	2025	Non-album promotional single
"Payaso"	2025	No Vayas a Atender Cuando el Demonio Llama

== Other charted songs ==
List of other charted songs
Title	Year	Peaks	Album
Title	Year	ARG	Album
"Yegua"	2023	73	Spotify Singles
"Lokura"	2025	81	No Vayas a Atender; Cuando El Demonio Llama
"Señora" (with Miranda! as BOM)	2026	15	Bailar o Morir
"Migajas" (with Miranda! as BOM)	2026	14	Bailar o Morir
"Adonde" (with Miranda! as BOM)	2026	20	Bailar o Morir
"Hiperlove" (with Miranda! as BOM)	2026	46	Bailar o Morir
"Ganar" (with Miranda! as BOM)	2026	54	Bailar o Morir
"Piel" (with Miranda! as BOM)	2026	65	Bailar o Morir
"Helecho" (with Miranda! as BOM)	2026	62	Bailar o Morir
"Vivo del Pop" (with Miranda! as BOM)	2026	42	Bailar o Morir

== Guest appearances ==
List of guest appearances showing year released and album name
Title	Year	Other artist(s)	Album
"No Digas Nada"	2003	Agustín Sierra	Rincón de Luz
"Me Pasan Cosas"	2006	None	24 Horas
"Por Una Sola Vez"	2006	None	24 Horas
"Escaparé"	2007	None	Teen Angels
"Hay Un Lugar..."	2008	None	Teen Angels 2
"Puedo Ser"	2008	María Eugenia Suárez	Teen Angels 2
"Siento"	2009	None	Teen Angels 3
"Me Voy"	2010	None	Teen Angels 4
"Quiero Salir del Paraíso"	2010	María Eugenia Suárez	Teen Angels 4
"Dime Por Qué"	2011	None	Teen Angels 5
"Own the Night"	2016	CD9	Revolution
"Todo a Pulmón"	2018	Alejandro Lerner, Abel Pintos, Axel, León Gieco, Rolando Sartorio, Sandra Mihanovich, Soledad	Non-album song
"Brilla"	2018	Abel Pintos	Vivero: Noche de Sueños
"Me Enamora" (Uncredited)	2020	Mau y Ricky	Desgenerados Mixtape
"Disparos"	2021	Abel Pintos	El Amor en Mi Vida
"La Apuesta"	2021	Melendi	Likes y Cicatrices
"Revolución"	2022	A.N.I.M.A.L.	Íntimo Extremo – 30 Años
"Dos Días en la Vida"	2023	Fito Páez, Nicki Nicole	EADDA9223
"Supersónico"	2024	Ca7riel & Paco Amoroso	Baño María
"La Carie"	2024	Dillom	Por Cesárea
"Fuego en el Fuego"	2025	Eros Ramazzotti	Una Historia Importante

== Music videos ==
List of music videos as lead artist, showing year released and directors
Title	Year	Other artist(s)	Director(s)	Ref.
"A Bailar"	2013	None	Juan Ripari	
"Asesina"	2014	None	Juan Ripari	
"No Estoy Sola"	2014	None	Juan Ripari	
"Mil Años Luz"	2015	None	Juan Ripari	
"Del Otro Lado"	2015	None	Juan Ripari	
"Necesito"	2015	None	Sebastián Pivotto	
"Histeria"	2015	None	Juan Ripari	
"Unico" (Lyric Video)	2016	None	Juan Ripari	
"Soy"	2016	None	Juan Ripari	
"Boomerang"	2016	None	Juan Ripari	
"Ego"	2016	None	Juan Ripari	
"Una Na"	2017	None	Juan Ripari	
"Tu Novia"	2017	None	Oscar Roho	
"Tu Sonrisa"	2017	None	Juan Ripari	
"100 Grados"	2018	A. Chal	Ariel Winograd; Diego Berakha	
"Y Dale Alegría a Mi Corazón"	2018	None	Spotify staff	
"Besarte Mucho"	2018	None	Diego Berakha	
"Sin Querer Queriendo"	2018	Mau y Ricky	Diego Berakha	
"Caliente"	2018	Pabllo Vittar	Os Primos	
"Lindo Pero Bruto"	2019	Thalía	Daniel Duran	
"Somos Amantes"	2019	None	Lali; Nicolás Gorla	
"Laligera"	2019	None	Orco	
"Como Así"	2019	CNCO	Joaquín Cambre	
"Lo Que Tengo Yo"	2020	None	Guido Adler; Lautaro Espósito	
"Fascinada"	2020	None	Fernando Rochese	
"Soy de Volar"	2020	Dvicio	Willy Rodríguez	
"Ladrón"	2020	Cazzu	Lali	
"Disciplina"	2022	None	Renderpanic	
"Diva"	2022	None	Renderpanic	
"Como Tú"	2022	None	Renderpanic	
"N5"	2022	None	Lautaro Furiolo	
"2 Son 3"	2022	None	Juan Gonzs	
"Quiero Todo"	2022	Soledad and Natalia Oreiro	Guido Adler; Lautaro Espósito	
"Motiveishon"	2022	None	Espósitos Brothers	
"Yo Te Diré"	2023	Miranda!	Melanie Anton Def	
"Una Vez Más"	2023	Pedro Capó	Andrés Ibáñez Díaz Infante	
"Cómprame un Brishito"	2023	None	Lali	
"Obsesión"	2023	None	Lautaro Espósito	
"Nochentera (Remix)"	2023	Vicco	Mario Arenas	
"Quiénes Son?"	2023	None	Lali	
"KO"	2023	None	Lautaro Espósito	
"Baum Baum"	2023	None	Lali; Lautaro Espósito	
"Corazón Perdido"	2023	None	Lali; Lautaro Espósito	
"A Oscuras"	2024	Ptazeta	Willy Rodríguez	
"Mil Horas"	2024	Cachorro López	Lautaro Espósito	
"S.O.S"	2024	Taichu	Juli Grasss; Cruz Larrosa	
"Fanático"	2024	None	Lautaro Espósito; Lali	

List of music videos as a featured artist, showing year released and directors
Title	Year	Other artist(s)	Director(s)	Ref.
"La Memoria"	2016	Artists for Memoria AMIA	Sebastián Orgambide	
"Mueve"	2016	Abraham Mateo	Hermanos Dawidson	
"Roma-Bangkok"	2017	Baby K	Gaetano Morbioli	
"Mi Mala (Remix)"	2018	Mau y Ricky, Karol G, Becky G and Leslie Grace	Daniel Durán; David Bohorquez	
"Prohibido (Remix)"	2018	CD9 and Ana Mena	Broducers	
"Todo a Pulmón"	2018	Alejandro Lerner, Abel Pintos, Axel, León Gieco, Rolando Sartorio, Sandra Mihanovich and Soledad	The Vrodas	
"Salta la Comba"	2019	Pinto "Wahin"	Daniel Duran	
"Las Maravillas de la Vida"	2020	Los Ángeles Azules	Diego Álvarez	
"Gente en la Calle"	2021	Fito Páez	Alejandro Ros; Guido Adler	
"Cuanto Antes"	2022	Álex Ubago	Mario Ruiz	

List of guest appearances in music videos, showing year released and directors
Title	Year	Other artist(s)	Director(s)	Ref.
"Cumbia del Permitido"	2016	Abel Ayala	Ariel Winograd	
"Paren de Matarnos"	2018	Miss Bolivia	Daniel Ortega; Gabriel Nicoli	
"¿Qué Vas a Hacer?"	2018	Ricardo Montaner	Marlene Rodriguez	
"Contigo"	2020	Danna Paola	Rodrigo Aroca	
"Cómo Dormiste?"	2022	Rels B	Unknown	
"Darling"	2022	Nicki Nicole	Jess Prasnik	
"La Baby"	2023	Tainy, Daddy Yankee, Feid and Sech	Elliot Muscatt; Jack Peros	

== Footnotes ==
Notes for peak chart positions

== See also ==
- Teen Angels discography
