= Lali Tour =

2023 concert tour by Lali

- Tour by Lali
- Promotional poster for the tour
- Location: Europe; Asia; Latin America
- Associated album: Lali
- Start date: 23 June 2023
- End date: 25 November 2023
- Legs: 1
- No. of shows: 13 in Europe; 3 in Latin America; 1 in Asia; 17 in total

Lali concert chronology
- Disciplina Tour (2022–23); Lali Tour (2023); Lali Tour 2025 (2025–26)

The Lali Tour was the sixth concert tour by Argentine singer Lali in support of her 2023 homonymous fifth studio album. It began on June 23, 2023, in Vienne, France at Theatre Antique, and concluded on November 25, 2023, in Montevideo, Uruguay at Rambla del Golf. The tour travelled across Spain, Italy, Switzerland, Mexico, Israel, Argentina and Uruguay.

== Background ==
After becoming the first Argentine woman to ever sold out the fifty-thousand-seat José Amalfitani Stadium with her Disciplina Tour in March 2023, Lali went on to perform at three more shows, closing the tour in San José, Guatemala on 8 April 2023. Five days later, she released her long-awaited fifth studio album Lali and promised to tour again during the year. In April 2023, Lali announced the Lali Tour with dates across Spain, Italy, France, Switzerland, Poland and the United Arab Emirates, with additional dates being later announced for Israel, Mexico and Argentina.

== Reception ==
=== Commercial performance ===
Along the European leg of the tour, Lali gathered over 250 thousand attendees. According to Paula Díaz of Los 40, Lali "reasserted her success in Spain" with the Lali Tour. However, "Lali's success was not news [since] she had found a second home [in the country] and it was demonstrated after having stepped on some of the most important Spanish festivals and having performed at some of the most important venues of the country." Moreover, the shows in Israel and Mexico were also sold-out.

=== Critical reception ===
Mona Blanchet of Le Dauphiné libéré praised Lali's performance: "It must be said that the artists of [the festival] also lit the fire well, in particular Lali". In her review of the Cádiz show, Ana Cristina Ruiz of Diario de Cádiz expressed that Lali was "non-combustible" while adding that "she had come to impress her public and she achieved it" and that "no one could stop staring at how she gave herself into the dancing and singing onstage in such an explosive way". Andrea Bisso of Perfil called the tour "historical."

== Set list ==
This set list is representative of the show on 24 June 2023 in Basel, Switzerland. It is not representative of all concerts for the duration of the tour.

1. "Eclipse"
2. "Asesina"
3. "2 Son 3"
4. "Diva"
5. "Histeria" (contains elements of "Don't Stop 'Til You Get Enough")
6. "Soy" (contains elements of "Vogue")
7. "Cómprame un Brishito"
8. "Caliente"
9. "Quiénes Son?"
10. "Obsesión"
11. "KO"
12. "Sola"
13. "Disciplina"
14. "Motiveishon" (with elements of "Satisfaction")
15. "Mil Años Luz" / "100 Grados" / "Unico" / "A Bailar"
16. "N5"
17. "Como Tú"

Notes:

- Starting from the show in Burriana, the remix version of "Nochentera" was performed on the rest of the shows in Spain.
- During the show in Madrid, Lali was joined onstage by Vicco to perform "Nochentera (Remix)".
- During the show in Tel Aviv, Lali performed "Ego" and "Boomerang". She also performed an acoustic mashup of "Hay un Lugar..." and "Escaparé".
- During the show in Mexico City, Lali performed "Ego", "Boomerang" and "Sin Querer Queriendo".
- During the show in Buenos Aires, Lali performed "1Amor".

== Shows ==
List of concerts, showing date, city, country, and venue
Date	City	Country	Venue
Europe
23 June 2023 (Note: The concert of 23 June 2023 was part of the Viva Latino Festival.)	Vienne	France	Theatre Antique
24 June 2023 (Note: The concert of 24 June 2023 was part of the Trapeton Switzerland festival.)	Basel	Switzerland	St. Jakobshalle
1 July 2023 (Note: The concert of 1 July 2023 was part of the Big Sound Festival.)	Valencia	Spain	City of Arts and Sciences
7 July 2023 (Note: The concert of 7 July 2023 was part of the Granca Live Festival.)	Las Palmas	Spain	Estadio Gran Canaria
9 July 2023 (Note: The concert on 9 July 2023 was part of the Milano Latin Festival.)	Milan	Italy	Ticketmaster Arena
22 July 2023 (Note: The concert on 22 July 2023 was part of the Boombastic Festival Asturias.)	Llanera	Spain	La Morgal
28 July 2023 (Note: The concert of 28 July 2023 is part of the Morriña Fest.)	A Coruña	Spain	Port of A Coruña
2 August 2023 (Note: The concert on 2 August 2023 is part of the Concert Music Festival.)	Cádiz	Spain	Poblado de Sancti Petri
6 August 2023 (Note: The concert on 6 August 2023 is part of the Arenal Sound festival.)	Burriana	Spain	Playa El Arenal
12 August 2023 (Note: The concert of 12 August 2023 is part of the Boombastic Festival Costa del Sol.)	Fuengirola	Spain	Marenostrum Fuengirola
13 August 2023 (Note: The concert of 13 August 2023 is part of the Vive La Feria festival.)	Torrelavega	Spain	Recinto Ferial La Lechera
19 August 2023 (Note: The concert of 19 August 2023 is part of the Boombastic Festival Alicante.)	Alicante	Spain	Área 12
2 September 2023 (Note: The concert of 2 September 2023 is part of the Coca-Cola Music Experience festival.)	Madrid	Spain	Caja Mágica Arena
Asia
5 September 2023	Tel Aviv	Israel	Hangar 11
Latin America
13 September 2023	Mexico City	Mexico	Lunario at Auditorio Nacional
16 September 2023 (Note: The concert of 16 September 2023 is part of Spotify's Equal Festival.)	Buenos Aires	Argentina	Hipódromo de Palermo
25 November 2023 (Note: The concert of 25 November 2023 is part of America Rockstars.)	Montevideo	Uruguay	Rambla del Golf

=== Cancelled shows ===
List of cancelled concerts
Date	City	Country	Venue	Reason
14 July 2023 (Note: The concert on 14 July 2023 would have been part of the Trapeton Summer Bash festival.)	Gdańsk	Poland	Stogi Beach	Festival cancelled
31 August 2023	Dubai	United Arab Emirates	Coca-Cola Arena	Unknown
