= Quiénes son? =

2023 single by Lali

"Quiénes Son?"
- Official music video poster

Single by Lali

from the album Lali
- English title: "Who Are They?"
- Released: 27 July 2023
- Genre: Pop
- Length: 2:42
- Label: Sony Music Argentina
- Songwriters: Mariana Espósito; Martín D'Agosto; Mauro De Tommaso
- Producer: Mauro De Tommaso

Lali singles chronology
"Nochentera (Remix)" (2023)	"Quiénes Son?" (2023)	"Baum Baum" (2023)

Music video
- "Quiénes Son?" on YouTube

"Quiénes son?" (transl. "Who Are They?") is a song by Argentine singer Lali, taken from her fifth studio album, Lali (2023). The song was written by Lali, Galán and its producer, Mauro De Tommaso. The title references a phrase said by Argentine actress Moria Casán during a 2012 television interview. Lyrically, the song was described as "a sarcastic ode against online hate culture". The track was released digitally on 27 July 2023 as the album's ninth and final single.

At the 26th Annual Premios Gardel, the music video for the song won the Best Music Video award. This achievement made Lali the first artist to win Best Music Video twice for clips from the same album, following her 2023 win with "Disciplina". Additionally, it marked Lali's first-ever win as a music video director.

== Background and release ==
During an interview for Rolling Stone Argentina magazine in July 2022, Lali talked about the production and composition process for her then upcoming fifth studio album. In that Interview, Lali and her team showed the interviewer some sounds and lyrics that could possibly be included on the record. Among these, the interviewer mentioned that there was a song that sampled the iconic "¿Quiénes son?" catchphrase said originally by Moria Casán during a 2012 television interview with Intrusos, which ended up giving the song its title. Later that year, while promoting the Prime Video series El fin del amor, Lali attended the Spanish show Los Prieto Flores where she expressed her admiration towards Casán and confirmed that the song was a homage to the ex-showgirl and would be included on the album.

On 30 March 2023, the singer revealed the official tracklist for Lali with the song being its seventh title. Finally, on 25 July 2023, she announced that "Quiénes Son?" would be released as the album's ninth and final single two days later with a 13-second clip that showed both artists in a car sharing a joint.

== Composition and recording ==
"Quiénes Son?" was written by Lali, Galán and Mauro De Tommaso, with production being in charge of the latter. According to Galán in an interview with Gente magazine, the song was born in Spain when Lali proposed to make a track in response to the constant criticism and online hate she receives. He also explained that the singer usually uses Argentine colloquialisms and other catchphrases by Casán as it is referenced throughout "Quienes Son?" and her previous single "Obsesión".

== Reception ==
=== Critical reception ===
"Quiéns Son?" received generally positive reviews from critics. Juana Giaimo of Rolling Stone Argentina magazine named the song a "very cool diss track". Lupe Torres of the Argentine newspaper La Nación wrote that "the complicity between Lali and Moria Casán was illustrated with the diva's participation in the song that portrays her as a symbol of empowerment". La Voz del Interior's Brenda Petrone Veliz commented that "La One's [Casán's] iconic catchphrase deserved to be used by someone who is as much of a diva as she is," adding that along with other phrases from the ex-showgirl, "they blend with a dark, deep and acidic beat that innovates, corrupts and raves". Belén Fourment of the Uruguayan newspaper El País described the song as a "sarcastoc ode against online hate".

Lucas Villa of Remezcla magazine asserted that "with 'Quiénes Son?' Lali added another gay anthem to her repertoire" along the already-existing "Soy", "Boomerang", "Reina" and "Caliente". He also added that she transformed Casán's expression into a "Latin trap banger about being one's unapologetic self". Billboard Argentina opined that "Quiénes Son?" blends the unprejudice and charisma of both artists. Moreover, in his review for Página 12 Adrían Melo praised the song and said "I don't hesitate to say that ["Quiénes Son?"] will have a similar status to classic gay anthems like 'Soy Lo Que Soy'".

=== Commercial performance ===
Following the release of Lali, three of its tracks entered the Billboard Hot Trending Songs chart including "Quiénes Son?", which debuted at number 11. In Argentina, the song debuted at number 86 on the Billboard Argentina Hot 100 chart on the week of 30 April 2023. After its publication as single in July 2023, the song re-entered the chart and reached the 74th position. Eventually, the song peaked at number 71.

== Music video ==
=== Production ===
The accompanying music video for "Quiénes Son?" was directed by Lali and premiered on 27 July 2023. Shooting for the clip took place on 14 June and lasted for about eight hours. During an interview with La Nación, Moria Casán was asked about her participation in the music video and said:

It's an honor that Lali, such a global icon who brings the house down everywhere she goes and who impresses me for how talented and genuine she is, has honored me by picking a dixit by me for making a videoclip directed by herself. [...] [The shooting] was beautiful, it was magical[;] so divine. I am glad to support the career of an actress and that she has honored me by choosing my catchphrase. With this clip, Lali is about to give birth to another hit. Transcending generations makes me really happy. As long as I can, I am always going to support the career of this incredible girl.

=== Synopsis ===
The music video begins with Lali and Casán driving a yellow Chevrolet Corvette while they sing the first verses of the song. During the trip, the two artists can be seen smoking a joint, drinking liquor from a hip flask and making obscene gestures. Eventually, they get off the car and pose in front of it. In the next scene, Lali and a group of dancers wearing brown clothes whose faces are covered perform a choreography to the rhythm of the chorus. Towards the end of the video, Casán wears multiple outfits that resemble those of her times as a showgirl in revue theatre. Meanwhile, Lali pays homage to the Argentine diva by wearing typical vedette clothes such as a corset, a sparkling headpiece or a black lace bodysuit and a dark-banged wig that imitates Casán's style.

=== Critical reception ===
The clip received generally positive reviews by critics and the audience. Télam wrote that "in the music video, Lali once again shows her talent as a well-rounded artist: singer, dancer and actress. Moria Casán reasserts her status as diva and her stage presence that transcends generations." Lupe Torres of La Nación stated that "Moria and Lali's chemistry eats the camera up and goes beyond the screen." Also, Adrián Melo of Página 12 expressed that "[the clip] will probably be the music video of the century by the local LGBT community.

== Charts ==
Weekly chart performance for "Quiénes Son?"
Chart (2023)	Peak position
Argentina Hot 100 (Billboard)	71
