= Disciplina Tour =

2022–23 concert tour by Lali

- Tour by Lali
- Promotional poster for the tour's opening show
- Start date: June 23, 2022
- End date: April 8, 2023
- Legs: 4
- No. of shows: 33 in Latin America; 3 in Europe; 2 in Asia; 38 in total
- Attendance: 550,000 (28 shows)

Lali concert chronology
- Brava Tour (2018–19); Disciplina Tour (2022–23); Lali Tour (2023)

The Disciplina Tour was the fifth concert tour by Argentine singer Lali. The tour saw multiple songs performed for the first time live, including those from her fourth studio album, Libra (2020) and songs belonging to her fifth studio album, Lali (2023), such as "Disciplina", "Diva" and "N5". It began on 23 June 2022 and it travelled across Latin America, Europe and Asia, concluding on 8 April 2023.

In March 2023, Lali became the first Argentine woman to ever sold out the fifty-thousand-seat José Amalfitani Stadium with the Disciplina Tour. The show was broadcast live on the TV special Disciplina Tour Live from Buenos Aires on Star+ and Disney+.

== Background ==
The Disciplina Tour marks Lali's comeback to performing live after closing her Brava Tour in Washington, D.C. back in November 2019. In 2020, Lali released her fourth studio album, Libra. Although intentions for touring were expressed, a proper tour could not be planned due to COVID-19 restrictions. In early 2022, after over a year without releasing new music, Lali released three singles consecutively: "Disciplina", "Diva" and "Como Tú", and confirmed that she would tour sometime that year, adding to an increasing anticipation for her new tour. On 4 April 2022, Lali finally announced the first date of the Disciplina Tour, which would take place on 23 June 2022 at the Luna Park Arena in Buenos Aires. The show sold out in less than three hours, forcing a new date to be added for the following day. When that show also sold out within hours, Lali announced a new date in the city, though this time the show would take place in a bigger venue, the Buenos Aires's Movistar Arena, which also sold out immediately. On 22 May 2022, the singer announced the first Argentine dates for the tour, which included stops in Mendoza, Mar del Plata, La Plata, Córdoba, and Rosario, among others.

== Critical reception ==
=== Argentina ===
From the beginning, the tour has received favorable reviews from the critic. In a positive review for Clarín, Marcelo Fernández Bitar described Lali as "a complete and talented show-woman, a hurricane capable of delivering a show of international nature, similar to those by Britney [Spears] or Madonna." Another positive opinion came from Juana Giaimo of Rolling Stone, who mentioned that during the show's development, "[Lali's] professionalism was clear in every step she took and it was clear in her voice that she has talent but also the ability to keep on singing with the same energy even while she danced." Martín Pérez of Diario Show highlighted Lali's maturity on stage and the repertoire selection as well as the choreographies and the live band. Similar thoughts were published by Mercedes Paz of Filo News, who pointed out that the most mesmerizing aspect of the concert were the choreographies, the multiple costume changes, the new versions of her songs, and the staging. Rocío Pascual of Red Boing gave out a similar response, saying that the show had been "a combination of millimetrically planned elements that gave life to something that up until then had not existed in Argentina." Similarly, Sofía Olivera of Gente ended her review saying that "once again, Lali showed that the charismatic and brave girl [...] is one of the biggest stars of new pop in Argentina." Diario Uno's Gabriel Soto wrote a review on the show in Mendoza and praised the show and its scenography and dancers, but admitted that it was not enough as regards vocals. On the other hand, Antonella Ramírez of Los Andes named Lali the "queen of Argentine pop" and highlighted the performances of "Ego" and "No Estoy Sola", referring to them as two of the most emotional moments of the night. Moreover, it was written in Mar del Plata's newspaper La Capital the show as "powerful and avant-garde." Reviewing the show for Aire Digital, Florencia Rosa defined the concert of Santa Fe as "a show of international quality, with musicians of excellence and dancers that showed talent in every genre" and said that Lali "did not stop smiling to the concert goers." Juan Manuel Pairone from Córdoba's newspaper La Voz del Interior described the concert as "an astonishing visual setting [with] multiple costume and setting changes" and complemented the review singling out "Disciplina" as "the most electronic part of the show", comparing the performance to those by Beyoncé or Lady Gaga. Daniela Barreiro of El Ciudadano reviewed the show of Rosario and remarked the concert and Lali's interaction with the attendants. She also praised the visibility and support from Lali to the trans-non-binary collective from Santa Fe. Nicolás Sánchez Picón also wrote a review for La Gaceta and praised the show and its set list, especially during "Diva", affirming that "what Lali does reminds [people] of the greatest pop icons."

=== Latin America ===
Belén Fourment of Uruguayan newspaper El País reviewed the show of Montevideo. She described Lali as "a pop monster of extraordinary dimensions" and commented that "being the best pop artist of the region has its cost and [Lali] pays it with an absolute delivery that displays her as an indisputable international figure." On her review for Soho Kulture, Carolina Rodríguez highlighted the show's production, choreographies and outfit changes, and held that "Lali has a small physical complexion, but on stage she is a giant."

Following the show in Santiago, Scarleth Nuñez of Agenda Pop praised Vesta Lugg's opening act and stated that "Lali shows that she can sing as good as she sings," although she singled out that "the only problem with the show is the space between songs, in which she simply disappears and nothing happens on stage."

=== Europe and Asia ===
In his review of the Madrid concert, Mario Caridad Sánchez of Los 40 described it as "an authentic electro-pop party that exceeded every expectation" and said that "from the very first moments, [her fans] showed devotion and emotion that would follow the singer throughout the rest of the night." Borja Arana of La Casa de Música wrote that the "Disciplina Tour invites you to total devotion; it is pure energy". He added that "the sensuality of the music on this show is one of its greatest pillars; it does not seek sexualization but energy."

As for the first Tel Aviv concert, Nofar Rotem of the Israeli website Frogi wrote that "Lali delivered an inverted and energetic performance."

== Venue records ==
Achievements of the Disciplina Tour
Year	Dates	Venue	Country	Description	Ref.
2023	March 4	José Amalfitani Stadium	Argentina	First female Argentine act to sell out a show on its full capacity.	

== Set list ==
This set list is representative of the show on 23 June 2022 in Buenos Aires. It is not representative of all concerts for the duration of the tour.

1. "Eclipse"
2. "Asesina"
3. "Tu Novia"
4. "Fascinada"
5. "Somos Amantes"
6. "Bailo Pa Mi"
7. "Diva"
8. "Histeria" (contains elements of "Don't Stop 'Til You Get Enough")
9. "Irresistible"
10. "Soy" (contains elements of "Vogue")
11. "Ego"
12. "Lo Que Tengo Yo"
13. "Ladrón"
14. "Como Así"
15. "Una Na"
16. "No Puedo Olvidarte"
17. "Sin Querer Queriendo"
18. "Caliente"
19. "2 Son 3"
20. "Del Otro Lado" (contains elements of "Vuelve a Mí")
21. "No Estoy Sola"
22. "Enredaos"
23. "Disciplina"
24. "Mil Años Luz"
25. "100 Grados"
26. "Unico"
27. "A Bailar"
28. "N5"
29. "Como Tú"
30. "Reina"
31. "Laligera"
32. "Boomerang"

Notes
- During the June shows in Buenos Aires, Lali performed "No Puedo Olvidarte" and "Sin Querer Queriendo" with Mau y Ricky.
- During the June, August, December and March shows in Buenos Aires, Lali was joined by Malevo to perform "Como Tú".
- During the August show in Buenos Aires, Lali performed "Ladrón" with Cazzu.
- During the March show in Buenos Aires, Lali performed "Yo Te Diré" with Miranda! and "Cómo Dormiste?" with Rels B.
- During the show in Madrid, Lali performed "Una Esquina en Madrid".
- During the December shows in Buenos Aires, Lali performed a cover of "Puente" by Gustavo Cerati.
- During the March show in Buenos Aires, Lali performed a mash-up between her own "Amor Es Presente" and "El Amor Después del Amor" by Fito Páez.
- "2 Son 3" was added to the setlist following the August show in Buenos Aires.
- "Motiveishon" was added to the setlist following the December shows in Buenos Aires." It contains elements of "Satisfaction" by Benny Benassi.
- "Cómprame un Brishito" was added to the setlist following the March show in Buenos Aires.

== Shows ==
List of concerts, showing date, city, country, and venue
Date	City	Country	Venue
Latin America
23 June 2022	Buenos Aires	Argentina	Luna Park
24 June 2022	Buenos Aires	Argentina	Luna Park
9 July 2022	Mendoza	Argentina	Arena Maipú
10 July 2022	Villa Mercedes	Argentina	Anfiteatro La Pedrera
15 July 2022	Bahía Blanca	Argentina	Estadio Osvaldo Casanova
16 July 2022	Mar del Plata	Argentina	Estadio Once Unidos
17 July 2022	La Plata	Argentina	Estadio Atenas
22 July 2022	Santa Fe	Argentina	Estación Belgrano
30 July 2022	Córdoba	Argentina	Plaza de la Música
31 July 2022	Rosario	Argentina	Metropolitano
4 August 2022	Salta	Argentina	Teatro Provincial
5 August 2022	Salta	Argentina	Teatro Provincial
6 August 2022	Tucumán	Argentina	Estadio Central Córdoba
13 August 2022	Montevideo	Uruguay	Antel Arena
18 August 2022	Santiago	Chile	Teatro Caupolicán
20 August 2022	Río Cuarto	Argentina	Costanera Opus
27 August 2022	Buenos Aires	Argentina	Movistar Arena
9 September 2022 (Note: The concert on 9 September 2022 is part of the 38th Fiesta Nacional del Pomelo.)	Laguna Blanca	Argentina	Polideportivo Municipal Evita
Europe and Asia
22 September 2022	Madrid	Spain	La Riviera
24 September 2022	Málaga	Spain	Sala París 15
25 September 2022	Barcelona	Spain	Sala Razzmatazz
28 September 2022	Tel Aviv	Israel	Kav Rakia
29 September 2022	Tel Aviv	Israel	Kav Rakia
South America
6 November 2022 (Note: The concert on 6 November 2022 in Neuquén was originally set to take place on 28 October 2022, but was postponed due to "intolerable caugh and fever".)	Neuquén	Argentina	Estadio Ruca Che
8 November 2022 (Note: The concert on 8 November 2022 in Trelew was originally set to take place on 29 October 2022 but was postponed due to "intolerable caugh and fever".)	Trelew	Argentina	Gimnasio Municipal
12 November 2022 (Note: The concert on 12 November 2022 is a free show organized by Lomas de Zamora Partido.)	Lomas de Zamora	Argentina	Parque Eva Perón
19 November 2022	Corrientes	Argentina	Estadio Boca Unidos
3 December 2022	Buenos Aires	Argentina	Movistar Arena
4 December 2022	Buenos Aires	Argentina	Movistar Arena
Latin America
9 February 2023 (Note: The concert on 9 February 2023 is part of La Chaya Festival.)	La Rioja	Argentina	Autódromo de La Rioja
12 February 2023 (Note: The concert on 12 February 2023 is part of the Villa María Festival.)	Villa María	Argentina	Anfiteatro Villa María
15 February 2023 (Note: The concert on 15 February 2023 is part of Fiesta de la Confluencia.)	Neuquén	Argentina	Parque Natural Isla 132
18 February 2023 (Note: The concert on 18 February 2023 is part of Fiesta Nacional del Lago.)	El Calafate	Argentina	Anfiteatro del Lago
24 February 2023 (Note: The concert on 24 February 2023 is part of the National Day of the Sun celebrations of 2023.)	San Juan	Argentina	Costanera Complejo Ferial
4 March 2023	Buenos Aires	Argentina	José Amalfitani Stadium
6 March 2023 (Note: The concert on 6 March 2023 is part of Fiesta Nacional de la Vendimia.)	Mendoza	Argentina	Teatro Griego
19 March 2023 (Note: The concert on 19 March 2023 is part of the Acá Estamos Festival.)	Montevideo	Uruguay	Rambla Presidente Wilson
8 April 2023 (Note: The concert on 8 April 2023 is part of Pepsi's Gira Refrescante.)	San José	Guatemala	Puerto San José

=== Cancelled shows ===
List of cancelled concerts
Date	City	Country	Venue	Reason
28 October 2022	Caleta Olivia	Argentina	Complejo Ingeniero Knudsen	Unknown
5 April 2023 (Note: The concert on 5 April 2023 in Lima was originally set to take place on 26 November 2022 at Park of the Exhibition Amphitheater but was postponed and relocated due to scheduling conflicts.)	Lima	Peru	Arena Perú	Venue was closed down

== Live broadcast ==
Disciplina Tour Live from Buenos Aires
- Disney+ poster
- Directed by: Demian Saiegh Cortizas
- Produced by: Bebe Contemponi; Carlos De Elia; Matías Pertiné
- Starring: Lali
- Edited by: Rodrigo Zanchez Armentano
- Production company: El Bajo Producciones
- Distributed by: Star+; Disney+
- Release date: March 4, 2023
- Running time: 180 minutes
- Country: Argentina
- Language: Spanish

Disciplina Tour Live from Buenos Aires is a concert film that was broadcast live exclusively on Star+ and Disney+ on March 4, 2023. The film follows Argentine singer Lali's performance at José Amalfitani Stadium in Buenos Aires, Argentina on her record-breaking headlining concert tour, the Disciplina Tour.

=== Critical reception ===
After giving a complete overview of the show, Milagros Amondaray of La Nación labelled it as "monumental". At the end of her rexiew, Amondaray wrote: "Amidst fireworks, colleagues hugging out, ecstatic choreographies [and] changing outfits, it could have been possible that the 50,000 people that where present got easily distracted with everything that surrounded the star of the night. However, it is difficult to gt distracted when Lali performs, dances, feels and demonstrates that it is not necessary to buy her any sparkle[;] she was born with extra ones," in reference to her single "Cómprame un Brishito" (Spanish for "buy me a little sparkle").

From her very first pop record effort, A Bailar, [Lali] was destined for great things in a genre in which she shines with the charisma that splashed over every aesthetic decision of a monumental show.

— Milagros Amondaray for La Nación.

On a similar tone, Lucas Terrazas gave the show a positive review after saying that Lali "shone onstage" and labelling the night as "historic" and "unforgettable". Billboard Argentina highlighted Lali's changing and dazzling outfits and singled out the energy and emotion that could be felt in the stadium when she performed some of her most popular ballads on the B-stage. In his review for Página 12, Martín Olavarría labelled the show as "electrifying" and pointed out that the staging resembled the industrial settings of classical films like Metrópolis and Modern Times. Finally, he called Lali the "true queen of Argentine pop". Also for Página 12, Camila Caamaño wrote that the show resembled Shakira's MTV Unplugged due to the dancers, live band, leather outfits and red-dyed hair, and chose Lali's dancing skills as the show's highlight. In his positive review for Clarín, Nicolás López wrote that with her freedom and confidence onstage, Lali displayed what she truly is: "Argentine pop's greatest diva". After calling her "funny, energetic and expert", Mercedes Paz of Filo News expressed that Lali performed at one of her most important with an apparent easiness and effectivity with which she makes being the most important contemporary pop artist of her generation seem like an easy task".

=== Performances ===
Thirty songs were performed in the following order in the broadcast:

1. "Eclipse"
2. "Asesina"
3. "Tu Novia"
4. "2 Son 3"
5. "Diva"
6. "Histeria" (with elements of "Don't Stop 'Til You Get Enough")
7. "Irresistible" (with elements of "Give Up the Funk (Tear the Roof off the Sucker)")
8. "Soy" (with elements of "Vogue")
9. "Yo Te Diré" (performed with Miranda!)
10. "Ego"
11. "Cómprame un Brishito"
12. "Una Na"
13. "Fascinada"
14. "Somos Amantes"
15. "Cómo Dormiste?" (performed with Rels B)
16. "Sin Querer Queriendo"
17. "Caliente"
18. "Del Otro Lado" (with elements of "Vuelve a Mí")
19. "No Estoy Sola"
20. "Amor Es Presente" / "El Amor Después del Amor"
21. "Disciplina"
22. "Motiveishon" (with elements of "Satisfaction")
23. "Mil Años Luz"
24. "100 Grados"
25. "A Bailar"
26. "Como Tú" (performed with Malevo)
27. "N5"
28. "Laligera"
29. "Boomerang"

== Notes ==
Notes for rescheduled shows

Notes for festival appearances
