= El fin del amor =

Argentine drama television series

- Genre: Comedy drama
- Created by: Tamara Tenenbaum; Erika Halvorsen
- Based on: El fin del amor, querer y coger by Tamara Tenenbaum
- Starring: Lali Espósito
- Country of origin: Argentina
- Original language: Spanish
- No. of seasons: 2
- No. of episodes: 18

Production
- Executive producers: Lali Espósito; Leticia Dolera; Diego Piasek; Tamara Tenenbaum
- Producers: Diego Copello; Leticia Cristi; Matías Mosteirín
- Production location: Buenos Aires
- Cinematography: Luciano Badaracco; Nicolas Trovato; Leandro Filloy
- Running time: 30 minutes
- Production companies: K&S Films; MGM Television

Original release
- Network: Amazon Prime Video
- Release: November 4, 2022 – April 16, 2025

El fin del amor (transl. "The End of Love") is an Argentine comedy drama television series created by Tamara Tenenbaum and Erika Halvorsen, based on the 2019 best seller essay "El fin del amor, querer y coger" by Tenenbaum. The series stars Lali Espósito, who also acted as executive producer. The plot follows the life of Tenenbaum, an Orthodox Jewish woman, as she leaves her traditional life behind to live new experiences that contrast sharply with her previous ideals of love and religion.

It was ordered by the streaming service Prime Video as a straight-to-series order of 10 episodes, for which production began in August 2021, and it premiered on 4 November 2022. In October 2023, it was announced that El Fin del Amor had been renewed for a second season which premiered on April 16, 2025.

== Plot ==
Tamara Tenenbaum (Lali Espósito) is a young woman born and raised in an Orthodox Jewish community who, after a sudden revelation about her education and culture, leaves her boyfriend to rebel against the concept of traditional romance just as she does with her religious life. The reason behind her abrupt change of direction is that she yearns for discovering and living new ways with different ideals or, actually, without them.

== Cast and characters ==
- Lali Espósito as Tamara Tenenbaum
- Verónica Llinás as Ruth Fridman
- Vera Spinetta as Juana Herrero
- Julieta Giménez Zapiola as Laura Almería
- Andrés Gil as Federico Villanueva
- Candela Vetrano as Debi Tenenbaum
- Brenda Kreizerman as Sara Levy
- Mariana Genesio Peña as Ofelia Weitzman
- Lorena Vega as Mora Bicker
- Martina Campos as Mijal Tenenbaum
- Mike Amigorena as Rodo Pizzicato
- Alejandro Tantanian as Tanta Ternura
- Gabriel Martín Fernández as Enri

== Episodes ==
Series	Episodes	Originally released
1	10	5 November 2022
2	8	16 April 2025

== Reception ==
=== Commercial performance ===
During its opening weekend, El Fin del Amor was the tenth most watched series and the most watched Spanish-language show around the world on Prime Video. It was also the most watched series in Afghanistan, Argentina, Colombia, the Dominican Republic, Spain, Guatemala, Israel, Jordan, Mexico, Paraguay, Uruguay and Venezuela, reaching the top ten in 26 countries.

=== Critical response ===
Professional ratings
Review scores
Source	Rating
La Nación	4/5 stars

El Fin del Amor was met with a very positive response from critics. Paula Vázquez Prieto of La Nación rated its first season four out of five stars and wrote: "Erika Halvorsen's and Tamara Tenenbaum's adaptation explores a generational view that is genuine and which might stick to some clichés but it does it from a place of honest humor without false cynicisms or imposed overcomings." Similarly, in his review for Clarín, Juan Tomás Erbiti wrote, "El Fin del Amor shows that you can still do sharp generational stories audiences can relate to, far from superficial clichés or solemn arguments."

=== Awards ===
Accolades received by The Handmaid's Tale
Award	Year	Category	Nominee(s)	Result	Ref.
Premios Sur	2023	Best Television Series	El Fin del Amor	Nominated	
Produ Awards	2023	Best Adapted Series	El Fin del Amor	Nominated	
Produ Awards	2023	Best Lead Actress – Comedy-drama series	Lali Espósito	Nominated	
Produ Awards	2023	Best Supporting Actress – Series	Mariana Genasio Peña	Nominated	
Produ Awards	2023	Best Showrunner – Drama or Comedy-drama	Erika Halvorsen	Nominated	
Silver Condor Series Awards	2023	Best Comedy or Musical Series	El Fin del Amor	Nominated	
Silver Condor Series Awards	2023	Best Direction	Leticia Dolera, Daniel Barone and Constanza Novick	Nominated	
Silver Condor Series Awards	2023	Best Lead Actress – Comedy or Musical Series	Lali Espósito	Won	
Silver Condor Series Awards	2023	Best Supporting Actor – Comedy or Musical Series	Mike Amigorena	Nominated	
Silver Condor Series Awards	2023	Best Supporting Actress – Comedy or Musical Series	Mariana Genasio Peña	Nominated	
Silver Condor Series Awards	2023	Best Supporting Actress – Comedy or Musical Series	Verónica Llinás	Won	
Silver Condor Series Awards	2023	Female Breakthrough	Julieta Zapiola	Nominated	
Silver Condor Series Awards	2023	Best Adapted Script	Erika Halvorsen and Tamara Tenenbaum	Won	
Silver Condor Series Awards	2023	Best Photography Direction	Luciano Badaracco, Nicolás Trovato and Leandro Filloy	Nominated	
Silver Condor Series Awards	2023	Best Costume Design	Patricia Conta	Nominated	
Silver Condor Series Awards	2023	Best Original Music	Iván Wyszogrod	Nominated	
Silver Condor Series Awards	2023	Best Theme Song	"Bailarás" by Lali (written by Lali Espósito, Martín D'Agosto and Mauro De Tommaso)	Won	
Silver Condor Series Awards	2023	Best Sound Design	Gonzalo Matijas and Matías Vilaró	Nominated	
Silver Condor Series Awards	2023	Best Casting Direction	Iair Said and Martina López Robol	Nominated	
Silver Condor Series Awards	2023	Best Makeup and Hair	Valeria Bredice and Ricardo Molina	Nominated	
Latin Martín Fierro Awards	2023	Best Adapted Television or Straming Series	El Fin del Amor	Nominated	
Martín Fierro Film & Series Awards	2025	Best Comedy Series	El Fin del Amor	Pending	
Martín Fierro Film & Series Awards	2025	Best Lead Actress in a Series	Lali Espósito	Pending	
Martín Fierro Film & Series Awards	2025	Best Lead Actress in a Series	Daniel Hendler	Pending	
Martín Fierro Film & Series Awards	2025	Best Supporting Actress in a Series	Lorena Vega	Pending	
Martín Fierro Film & Series Awards	2025	Best Original Music	"El Fin Del Amor" by Lali (written by Lali Espósito, Martín D'Agosto, Mauro De Tommaso and Federico Barreto)	Pending	
