= Boombastic Festival =

Boombastic Festival is a music festival in Spain.

Boombastic X-Mas Fest took place on 10–11 December 2021 and had performances by Kaydy Cain, Maikel Delacalle, and Ptazeta.

It also occurred on 21–23 July 2022 in Asturias with 40,000 attendees but failed to provide promised transportation at the end of the festival. Two men were also arrested for drug trafficking in the festival.

In August 2022 it also occurred in Benidorm with 60,000 attendees (20,000 per day).

In 2023 the festival was scheduled to be held on at Canary Islands on 23–24 June, Asturias on 20–22 July, Costa del Sol on 12 August, and Alicante on 17–19 August.

The 2023 Alicante edition was featured Bizarrap, Duki, and Bad Gyal.

During the 2023 Asturias edition 165,000 attendees were expected and a Boombastic bus driver was caught driving with triple the legal alcohol limit.

The FACUA denounced the Boombastic festival in Canary Islands 2023 for prohibiting bringing food and drink.

In the July 2024 edition in Llanera Asturias a 25-year-old man died on the Ferris wheel.

== See also ==
Bilbao BBK Live
