= Como Tú (Lali song) =

2022 single by Lali

Single by Lali

from the album Lali
- Released: 10 February 2022
- Genre: Pop; electropop
- Length: 2:46
- Label: Sony Music Argentina
- Songwriters: Mariana Espósito; Martín D'Agosto; Mauro De Tommaso
- Producer: Mauro De Tommaso

Lali singles chronology
"Diva" (2022)	"Como Tú" (2022)	"Solo" (2022)

Music video
- "Como Tú" on YouTube

"Como Tú" (transl. "like you") is a song by Argentine singer Lali. It was released on 10 February 2022 by Sony Music Argentina as the third single from the singer's fifth studio album Lali (2023). It was written by Lali, Galán, and its producer Mauro De Tommaso. Lyrically, the song is about an unconditional, unique and strong love.

Following the release of "Disciplina" and "Diva", the song completes Lali's trilogy of singles titled Lali 2022 with which she came back to her pop music origins after exploring Latin sounds like reggaeton and trap in her previous records Brava (2018) and Libra (2020).

== Background and release ==
On 9 February 2022, Lali was invited to the Spanish television show El Hormiguero to promote her singles "Disciplina" and "Diva" and to spoil details of the shooting of the third and last season of Sky Rojo. During the interview with Pablo Motos, she previewed "Como Tú" and showed imaged from its music video in which she could be seen with longer hair carrying out a choreography. The song was released the following day.

"Como Tú" completed Lali's singles trilogy Lali 2022 with which she made her highly anticipated comeback to music. With this trilogy of singles, she opened a new era in her musical career in which she decided to explore new genres and move away from the Latin sounds of her latest productions.

== Composition ==
"Como Tú" was written by Lali, Martín D'Agosto (also known as Galán) and Mauro De Tommaso, with who she had already worked for the other releases of the singles trilogy. In an interview for Diario Hoy, D'Agosto talked about the composition of the song and his relationship with Lali, and said: "We created [the song] in one night. Writing songs that fascinates us and having fun in our own way was always the goal, and with "Como Tú" I feel that we got fully in that terrain. The three of us are very proud of the pop song we made and Lali took this [song] and the previous ones to an incredible visual world."

The lyrics of "Como Tú" are about an unconditional, unique and strong love. The production of the song was in charge of De Tommaso, who worked on it as a pop song that reminisces of the electropop music from the nineties. The song was described as "catchy, danceable and perfect for the dancefloor."

== Charts ==
Chart (2022)	Peak position
Argentina Hot 100 (Billboard)	62
Argentina Airplay (Monitor Latino)	7
Argentina Latin Airplay (Monitor Latino)	7
Argentina National Songs (Monitor Latino)	1
