= Nochentera =

2022 single by Vicco and Lali

Single by Vicco

from the album Noctalgia
- Released: 19 December 2022
- Genre: Electropop; dance-pop
- Length: 3:22
- Label: Sony Music Spain
- Songwriters: Victoria Riba; Joan Valls Paniza; Ruben Perez Perez
- Producers: Vicco; Kickbombo

Vicco singles chronology
"Memoria de Pez" (2022)	"Nochentera" (2022)	"Me Muero x Ti" (2023)

Music video
- "Nochentera" on YouTube

"Nochentera" (blend word for "noche entera", transl. "the whole night") is a song performed by Spanish singer Vicco, written and produced by herself and Kickbombo. It was released by Sony Music Spain on 19 December 2022, as one of the songs in the Benidorm Fest 2023, aiming to represent Spain at the Eurovision Song Contest. The song finished in third place in the competition.

== Composition ==
"Nochentera" was composed by Vicco, Joan Valls Paniza, and Rubén Pérez Pérez, who also co-produced the track alongside the singer. According to Vicco, the song's lyrics reflect "that moment when you're infatuated with someone and will do anything to see them". The composition of the song began in May 2022, prior to Vicco's involvement in the RTVE contest. She discovered a beat titled "noche ochentera" (eighties night) on a studio computer, which inspired her to begin composing the song.

== Benidorm Fest 2023 ==
"Nochentera" participated in the Benidorm Fest 2023, organized by Radiotelevisión Española (RTVE) to select Spain's representative for the Eurovision Song Contest 2023. The event took place at the Palacio de Deportes L'Illa in Benidorm, Valencian Community. The competition featured eighteen participants, each with a song in the running, divided across two preliminary semi-finals, with nine performances per gala. In each semi-final, the top four songs, based on votes from professional juries (50%), a demographic panel (25%), and televote (25%), advanced directly to the final. During the final, the eight qualifying songs returned, with the same voting system used as in the semi-finals.

Vicco competed in the second semi-final, held on 2 February 2023, where she finished in second place, earning 67 points from the professional jury, 40 from the public, and 28 from the televote, totaling 135 points. In the final, "Nochentera" scored a combined total of 129 points, finishing in third place behind Blanca Paloma's "Eaea" (169 points) and Agoney's "Quiero Arder" (145 points). It achieved the best result from the demoscopic jury.

== Critical reception ==
Carlos Marcos, from the Spanish newspaper El País, analyzed the eighteen contenders to represent Spain in Eurovision and described "Nochentera" as "innocent and danceable". He added that it is "a song in a style similar to Aitana's that [would] appeal to young people". Sebas E. Alonso from Jenesaispop stated that the song "has a phrasing very much like Shakira, a production reminiscent of Dua Lipa, and a nod to Rihanna's Umbrella. But above all," he added, [the song] fits the aesthetic parameters of Aitana's hits".

== Commercial performance ==
After its release, the song debuted with 30,919 streams on Spotify, marking the fourth-best debut among the Benidorm Fest 2023 contenders. A month later, the song had surpassed one million streams on the platform, making Vicco the first artist of the edition to reach this milestone with her entry. By July of the same year, "Nochentera" had become the most-streamed song of the Benidorm Fest, surpassing the previous record held by Chanel's "SloMo" (2022).

In Spain, the song debuted at number 28 on the PROMUSICAE charts during the week of 14 February 2023. In its second week, it had the biggest rise on the chart, climbing 11 positions to number 17. Finally, in its tenth week, it reached number 5, marking it Vicco's first entry into the top five.

== Charts ==
=== Weekly charts ===
Weekly chart performance for "Nochentera"
Chart (2023)	Peak position
Paraguay (SGP)	71
Spain (Promusicae)	5
Spain Songs (Billboard)	5
Spain Top 50 Radios (PROMUSICAE)	1

=== Year-end charts ===
2023 year-end chart performance for "Nochentera"
Chart (2023)	Peak position
Spain (PROMUSICAE)	3
Spain Top 50 Radios (PROMUSICAE)	3

== Certifications ==
Certifications for "Nochentera"
Region	Certification	Certified units/sales
Spain (Promusicae)	9× Platinum	540,000^{‡}
^{‡} Sales+streaming figures based on certification alone.

== Remix ==
"Nochentera (Remix)"

Single by Vicco and Lali
- Released: 14 July 2023
- Genre: Electropop; dance-pop
- Length: 3:52
- Label: Sony Music Spain
- Songwriters: Victoria Riba; Mariana Espósito; Joan Valls Paniza; Ruben Perez Perez
- Producers: Vicco; Kickbombo

Vicco singles chronology
"Todo Me Da Igual" (2023)	"Nochentera (Remix)" (2023)	"Pop" (2023)

Lali singles chronology
"Obsesión" (2023)	"Nochentera (Remix)" (2023)	"Quiénes Son?" (2023)

Music video
- "Nochentera (Remix)" on YouTube

Lali first listened to "Nochentera" after a friend recommended the song to her, saying, "You're going to like it because it's pop, it's good, and it’s very much like you". According to the Argentine singer, she "loved it". Later, Lali reached out to Vicco on social media and sent her a private message to congratulate her on the song. In response, the Spanish singer excitedly replied and proposed collaborating on a remix, as she explained in an interview with El HuffPost. The two artists recorded their parts separatedly and the remix version was finally released as a single on 14 July 2023.

=== Critical reception ===
Mario Caridad from Los 40 expressed that "Lali's introduction to the song matches the quality of the original version, adding her distinctive touch while introducing some changes". He also noted: "Lali has come to stay and make the song her own". The Spanish newspaper 20 Minutos commented that "the remix gives the song a new personality without losing the essence of the original".

=== Charts ===
==== Weekly charts ====
Weekly chart performance for "Nochentera (Remix)"
Chart (2023–2024)	Peak position
Argentina Airplay (Monitor Latino)	12
Argentina Latin Airplay (Monitor Latino)	11
Paraguay Pop (Monitor Latino)	16
Peru Pop (Monitor Latino)	13
Spain Airplay (Monitor Latino)	17
Spain Pop Rhythmic (Monitor Latino)	11

==== Year-end charts ====
2024 year-end chart performance for "Nochentera (Remix)"
Chart (2024)	Peak position
Spain Airplay (Monitor Latino)	81
Spain Pop Rhythmic (Monitor Latino)	48

==== Year-end charts ====
2025 year-end chart performance for "Nochentera (Remix)"
Chart (2025)	Peak position
Spain Airplay (Monitor Latino)	93
Spain Pop Rhythmic (Monitor Latino)	48
