= Diva (Lali song) =

2022 single by Lali

Single by Lali

from the album Lali
- Language: Spanish
- Released: 27 January 2022
- Recorded: 2021
- Genre: Pop; neo soul; R&B
- Length: 3:06
- Label: Sony
- Songwriters: Mariana Espósito; Daniel Amarise Diaz; Martín D'Agosto; Mauro De Tommaso
- Producers: Dano; Mauro De Tommaso

Lali singles chronology
"Disciplina" (2022)	"Diva" (2022)	"Como Tú" (2022)

Music video
- "Diva" on YouTube

"Diva" is a song recorded by Argentine singer Lali. The song was released by Sony Music Argentina on 27 January 2022, as the second single from Lali's fifth studio album, Lali (2023). The song was written by Lali, Martín D'Agosto, Dano, and Mauro De Tommaso, and produced by the latter two. It was the second release from Lali's 2022 singles trilogy following "Disciplina" and preceding "Como Tú".

== Composition and lyrics ==
I wanted to approach the world of big divas and pay homage to it, while playing with irony. The concept of diva is now highly globalized: there used to be some kind of mystery attached to a diva, they were only a selected group – which I admired; now, divas are everywhere.

— Lali on the concept of "Diva", Shangay

"Diva" is a downtempo song that fuses pop, neo soul and R&B. Its lyrics find Lali ironically boasting about her often-acknowledged status of diva, a celebrated woman of outstanding talent in the world of popular music. Since the beginning of her career, the media has granted Lali the titles of "Pop Diva", "Queen of Argentine Pop", or "Current Queen of Latin Pop", among others. The lyrics feature multiple references to iconic elements in pop culture that are often associated to a diva's lifestyle such as Louis Vuitton's red bottom shoes, Chanel's bags, private jets, Egyptian cotton. It also includes references and self-comparisons to pop icons Marilyn Monroe, Cher and Britney Spears. Musically, the song resembles a late-nineties and early-two-thousands style having a break or interlude featuring claps, cheering voices, percussions and sound effects. It has been compared to Britney Spears' song "(You Drive Me) Crazy". The song also features numerous winks at Lali's own song "Laligera" (2019), in which she discusses her rise to fame while remaining humble.

== Music video ==
The accompanying music video for "Diva" was directed by Renderpanic and produced by The Movement. With a minimalistic aesthetic, Lali first appears getting out of a strongbox to perform a jazz-R&B choreography to the beat of the song while being looked by mysterious people in all black. As the video progresses, Lali gets covered in gold until she is fully covered, resembling a golden statue. According to the singer:

[The diva that I portray] ends up becoming a golden statue, someone empty. I used the element of gold to materialize the idea of wealth, success and power. However, the real danger is that gold tear and loneliness. That is why I appear alone the entire video. Had I shown back-up dancers, the diva would be accompanied, but no; she is alone. The entire time.

In the song, Lali sings "I dance like Britney; I dress like Cher". This is mirrored in the music video as Lali wears a golden dress similar to a well-known Bob Mackie dress that Cher wore back in 1978.

== Charts ==
Chart (2022)	Peak position
Argentina Hot 100 (Billboard)	80
Argentina National Songs (Monitor Latino)	14
