= N5 (song) =

2022 single by Lali

Single by Lali

from the album Lali
- Language: Spanish
- Released: 22 June 2022
- Recorded: 2021
- Genre: Pop; flamenco pop; house
- Length: 2:34
- Label: Sony
- Songwriters: Mariana Espósito; Martín D'Agosto; Mauro De Tommaso
- Producer: Mauro De Tommaso

Lali singles chronology
"Cuanto Antes" (2022)	"N5" (2022)	"2 Son 3" (2022)

Music video
- "N5" on YouTube

"N5" is a song recorded by Argentine singer Lali. The song was released by Sony Music Argentina on 22 June 2022, as the fourth single from Lali's fifth studio album, Lali (2023). The song was written by Lali, Martín D'Agosto and its producer Mauro De Tommaso. The song's title references the famous perfume Chanel No. 5 by Coco Chanel.

== Lyrics and composition ==
"N5" is a pop song with elements of house and flamenco. The incorporation of elements of Spanish culture into her music is only natural as Lali had settled in Spain between 2019 and 2022 to film Sky Rojo. In fact, Lautaro Furiolo, the director of the single's music video, revealed that Lali wrote the song with the Madrilenian night in mind. Its lyrics find Lali describing a same-sex relationship for the first time after coming out as bisexual some years before.

== Background and release ==
The song was released on 22 June 2022, one day before Lali kicked off her Disciplina Tour. Once "N5" was released, fans and the media were quick to relate the song to the Spanish singer Lola Indigo. Some months before, Lali and Lola had been recorded kissing at a party, which had made the headlines of numerous magazines and news portals. These rumors spread rapidly as the lyrics of the song mention find Lali and a mysterious woman being recorded while making out at a party and appearing on cover pages afterwards. After much speculation, Lali confirmed that the inspiration behind the song was indeed Lola Indigo. The Spanish singer also commented on the song and mentioned that she keeps a nice friendship with Lali.

== Music video ==
The accompanying music video for "N5" was released together with the single on 22 June 2022. Directed by Lautaro Furiolo and filmed at the Coliseo Theater in Lomas de Zamora, Argentina, the clip sees Lali showing herself off as an actress in a story full of glamour, seduction and an Iberian imprint. The video features guest appearances by Leonardo Sbaraglia and Verónica Llinás, with whom Lali had previously worked in The Accused (2018) and El Fin del Amor (2022), respectively.

=== Synopsis ===
At the beginning of the clip, Lali enters a hotel parlour where an elegant dinner is taking place. In one of the many gambling tables, Llinás is accompanied by a woman who catches the attention of Lali. After exchanging glances, both women leave the room and carry out a choreography in a private place. Later, they leave the hotel and dance together with a ten of other diverse dancers. Towards the end of the clip, it is revealed that everything had taken place in Lali's mind as Sbaraglia enters the room and exchange complicit looks with her. The woman then receives a tarot card, which is believed symbolizes an invitation to join Lali and Sbaraglia on their hotel room.

== Commercial performance ==
"N5" became an instant success in Argentina and Uruguay. In Argentina, the song reached the seventeenth spot on Spotify's Argentina Top 200 chart, the highest position ever for any Lali song. The song debuted at number 86 on the Billboard Argentina Hot 100 and surged to number 14 on the following week. Eventually, the song entered the chart's top ten at number nine, marking Lali's highest charting song since the chart's debut in October 2018 and her first ever top ten entry. In August 2022, the single received a gold certification in Argentina.

== Charts ==
=== Weekly charts ===
Chart (2022)	Peak position
Argentina Hot 100 (Billboard)	9
Argentina Airplay (Monitor Latino)	1
Argentina Latin Airplay (Monitor Latino)	1
Argentina National Songs (Monitor Latino)	1
Chile Pop Airplay (Monitor Latino)	16
Peru Pop Airplay (Monitor Latino)	14
Uruguay Airplay (Monitor Latino)	6
Uruguay Latin Airplay (Monitor Latino)	6

=== Year-end charts ===
2022 year-end chart performance for "N5"
Chart (2022)	Position
Argentina Airplay (Monitor Latino)	44
Argentina Latin Airplay (Monitor Latino)	33
Uruguay Airplay (Monitor Latino)	52
Uruguay Latin Airplay (Monitor Latino)	44

== Certifications ==
Region	Certification	Certified units/sales
Argentina (CAPIF)	Gold	10,000^{‡}
^{‡} Sales+streaming figures based on certification alone.
