= 2 Son 3 =

2022 single by Lali

Single by Lali

from the album Lali
- Language: Spanish
- Released: 25 August 2022
- Genre: Electropop; pop rock
- Length: 2:45
- Label: Sony
- Songwriters: Mariana Espósito; Martín D'Agosto; Mauro De Tommaso
- Producer: Mauro De Tommaso

Lali singles chronology
"N5" (2022)	"2 Son 3" (2022)	"Quiero Todo" (2022)

Music video
- "2 Son 3" on YouTube

"2 Son 3" (transl. "two are three") is a song recorded by Argentine singer Lali. The song was released by Sony Music Argentina on 25 August 2022 as the fifth single from Lali's fifth studio album, Lali (2023). The song was written by Lali, Martín D'Agosto and its producer Mauro De Tommaso. In the song, Lali expresses her preference of threesomes over monogamous sexual relationships.

== Lyrics and composition ==
"2 Son 3" is an electronic pop song with elements of rock music. The song is the continuation of a "universe of exploration" of Lali's self-freedom and limits that she has been exploring since "Disciplina". The singer expressed that "on the surface, [the song] is about a threesome." However, Lali suggested that a deeper look into its lyrics and music video hints at "mental repression, brainwashing, and the scarce freedom that we sometimes have to say what we want [and] what we like."

== Music video ==
The accompanying music video for "2 Son 3" premiered at a cinema in Buenos Aires for a three-hundred-fan exclusive event a few hours ahead of its official release on YouTube. Filmed in Mendoza, Argentina, it was directed by Juan Gonzs and produced by BS+ and Sony Music.

=== Synopsis ===
The music video portrays how society seeks to indoctrinate and convert non-conventional people into conventional ones. "In a Terminator-like way," Lali is the last human being on Earth who has not received a lobotomy. In the beginning of the clip, she is shown preparing and training herself for something which is not yet specified. Then, she gets into her motorbike and turns herself in at a technological, futuristic place where some bad, conservative men capture her. There, Lali is tied to a chair, receives a lobotomy, is electrocuted and subjected to water torture to get information out of her and convert her into a "conventional" person. While this happens, images of a stone, which represents Lali's strength, are juxtaposed. In the end, the scene becomes more colorful as Lali escapes on her motorbike and she reaches and touches the stone, referencing that she has survived every attempt to convert her into a conventional person.

== Charts ==
Chart (2022)	Peak position
Argentina Hot 100 (Billboard)	35
Argentina Airplay (Monitor Latino)	7
Argentina Latin Airplay (Monitor Latino)	6
Argentina National Songs (Monitor Latino)	2
Uruguay (Monitor Latino)	12
