= Baum Baum =

2023 single by Lali

Single by Lali

from the album Lali (Deluxe)
- Released: 12 December 2023
- Recorded: August 2023
- Genre: Pop; EDM
- Length: 2:34
- Label: Sony Argentina
- Songwriters: Mariana Espósito; Martín D'Agosto; Mauro De Tommaso
- Producer: Mauro De Tommaso

Lali singles chronology
"Quiénes Son?" (2023)	"Baum Baum" (2023)	"A Oscuras" (2024)

Music video
- "Mi Fiesta (Baum Baum & Corazón Perdido)" on YouTube

"Baum Baum" is a song by Argentine singer Lali, included on the deluxe edition of her fifth studio album Lali (2023). The song was released as the album's tenth and final single overall on 12 December 2024. It was written by Lali, Galán, and its producer Mauro De Tommaso. Its accompanying music video is featured in the short film Mi Fiesta along with another deluxe track, "Corazón Perdido".

== Charts ==
=== Weekly charts ===
Weekly chart performance for "Baum Baum"
Chart (2023–2024)	Peak position
Argentina Airplay (Monitor Latino)	9
Argentina Latin Airplay (Monitor Latino)	8
Argentina National Songs (Monitor Latino)	5

=== Year-end charts ===
2024 year-end chart performance for "Baum Baum"
Chart (2024)	Position
Argentina Airplay (Monitor Latino)	40
Argentina Latin Airplay (Monitor Latino)	34

== Mi Fiesta ==
Promotional poster

Mi Fiesta is a 2023 short film directed by Argentine singer and actress Lali and Argentine filmmaker Lautaro Espósito. It is an accompanying piece to the deluxe reissue of Lali's fifth studio album, Lali (2023), and it includes the music videos for "Baum Baum" and "Corazón Perdido". The short film follows Lali and her journey through the realms of open relationships and partying, ultimately leading her to a state of emptiness. Argentine actor Peter Lanzani and Spanish actor Jesús Mosquera make guest appearances in the short film.

=== Plot ===
The short film opens up with a close-up of Lali delivering a monologue about her "vital conception of love" while staring directly at the camera. In her monologue, she says:

It's simpler. What is difficult is the other, the stable. When something is alive, it never stays still; we see it in nature. Impermanence is the only thing that remains. I believe there's a system that benefits from anesthesia; that's why a symbol of stability, of healthy calm, was built around the couple. That simulation of stillness, on the other hand, makes you feel productive, but who does it benefit? I bet on love, but on a lively, active love. A love that wants me authentic, that doesn't play tricks on me, that doesn't use tactics. A love that includes the other. A love that looks at me with clear eyes. And that's what my party is about; it's a parenthesis to recover the life force, enchantment, and electricity.

The scene suddenly shifts to a wider shot of Lali wearing a green jacket in a press conference reminiscent to those held in Hollywood in the seventies and eighties akin to the style mirrored by a Gucci eyewear campaign in 2018. The voice of a reporter (Candela Vetrano) is heard inquiring Lali about her dating status and maternity plans. Clearly annoyed, Lali laughs sarcastically, averts her gaze, and asks for the following question. The scene then cuts abruptly to a rave, and "Baum Baum" starts playing.

Hand in hand with her partner (Jesús Mosquera), Lali arrives at what appears to be a bustling gay bar filled with drag queens, people voguing in extravagant outfits and couples engaged in intimate moments. Lali and Mosquera dance casually together and then the singer performs a choreography to the song's chorus of the song. As the night progressess, both Lali and Mosquera start dancing with other people in the place while they stare at each other. Eventually, they find themselves making out, only to be interrupted by a woman who kisses Lali. Despite Mosquera's attempts to get back to Lali, he is dismissed. When he departs, Lali follows him. In the subsequent scene, two men enter a dressing room where Lali and Mosquera are embroiled in a heated argument. He reproaches Lali for her actions, insinuating an agreement within their relationship, a claim vehemently denied by Lali, who questions his understanding of her. Fueled by rage, Lali exits the room, returning to the dance floor. The music resumes, and images of revelry and intimacy are interspersed with Lali's face displaying a worried expression. The clip concludes with Lali standing still in the center of the dance floor while the party continues around her.

Lali exits the bar, leans against one of its walls, and lets out a worried sigh. Taking inspiration from Jeremy Allen White's character in The Bear, a waiter (Peter Lanzani) hands Lali a cigarette. She accepts it with her gaze fixed on him. The waiter says to Lali:

You still have time to beat the birds. Emptiness is not for everyone, especially when the birds start to chirp. If you feel like crying, if you have sex with anyone, if your head, stomach, soul hurts, if you've stopped feeling, everyone knows. Go before they find out. The sun is about to rise.

Lali expresses her gratitude, leaves, and as she departs, the waiter returns to the bar, and the melody of "Corazón Perdido" begins to play.

The clip follows Lali through the streets of Buenos Aires with her face bearing a melancholic expression. She is adorned in a black leather coat with her hair tied in a bun, reminiscent of her appearance on the cover of her album Lali. The sequence alternates between color footage of Lali navigating the streets and black-and-white images capturing her engaging in a free dance routine. As the sun begins to rise, signaling the end of the night, Lali finds herself standing on a rooftop overlooking Buenos Aires's Obelisco. Tears stream down her face, conveying a profound emotion. The clip reaches its conclusion with Lali lying on the floor, curled up in a fetal position, overwhelmed by despair and emptiness.
