= Obsesión (Lali song) =

2023 single by Lali

- Official music video poster

Single by Lali

from the album Lali
- English title: "Obsession"
- Released: April 13, 2023
- Genre: Pop
- Length: 3:11
- Label: Sony Argentina
- Songwriters: Mariana Espósito; Martín D'Agosto; Mauro De Tommaso
- Producer: Mauro De Tommaso

Lali singles chronology
"Cómprame Un Brishito" (2023)	"Obsesión" (2023)	"Nochentera (Remix)" (2023)

Music video
- "Obsesión" on YouTube

"Obsesión" (transl. "obsession") is a song by Argentine singer Lali, taken from her fifth studio album, Lali (2023). The song was written by Lali, Galán, and its producer Mauro De Tommaso. It was released by Sony Music Argentina on 13 April 2022 along with the album as its eighth single.

At the 26th Annual Premios Gardel, "Obsesión" won the Song of the Year award, marking Lali's third win in this category. She previously won in 2019 with "Sin Querer Queriendo" and in 2021 with "Ladrón". This achievement made Lali the first female artist, and the third overall, to secure three Song of the Year wins, joining the ranks of Abel Pintos and Vicentico. The song also competed in the Record of the Year and Best Pop Song categories.

== Composition ==
"Obsesión" works as the opener to Lali. It was written by the self-proclaimed "Triunvirato del Pop", consisting of Lali, Galán and Mauro De Tommaso. Lyrically, the song narrates a breakup with someone with whom she had a toxic relationship and who still chases her but she rejects.

The song captures the intention of the album from the very beginning as the opening instrumental already resembles those popular early 2000s pop sounds. Among these, "Love Don't Cost a Thing" by Jennifer Lopez, "The Call" by the Backstreet Boys and "Bye Bye Bye" by NSYNC were perceived as influences. The song's most notorious reference is a sample to Britney Spears's "The Stop!" remix version of her 1998 song "(You Drive Me) Crazy" in the middle of its chorus. In the interlude, the song references Luis Miguel's 1996 song "Cómo Es Posible Que a Mi Lado" and a phrase said by Argentine pop icon Moria Casán in the TV show La Noche de Mirtha. At the same time, Lali talks to someone on the phone, which coincides with the man that called her asking for forgiveness in her 2014 song "Desamor" from her debut studio album A Bailar.

== Music video ==
An accompanying music video directed by Lautaro Espósito and co-directed by Lali and Niko Sedano was released on 13 April 2023. The clip shows Lali and her dance coach with whom she had had a secret relationship but with whom she is not longer dating. In class, she notices, from the way he used to treat her, that she has a new relationship with one of her classmates. Heartbroken, Lali walks the streets of Madrid while she performs a professional dance routine at the dance studio. The clip references the 1983 American romantic drama dance film Flashdance and features Juan Minujín as the dance coach.

== Reception ==
=== Critical reception ===
Brenda Petrone Veliz of La Voz del Interior wrote that "the single could be sung as a Spanish pop anthem along the Cheetah Girls". Moreover, it was written in Monitor Latino that the song "paved the way for new generations of artists seeking to break barriers and conquer the world with their music. This surprising success demonstrates that passion, talent, and innovation are key elements in reaching the top of the charts and staying in the memory of listeners."

=== Commercial performance ===
Following the release of the album, "Obsesión" debuted at number 13 on the Billboard Hot Trending Songs chart. In Argentina, the song debuted at number 23 before peaking at number 20. "Obsesión" also charted on the Monitor Latino Uruguayan, Paraguayan and Argentine airplay charts. In the latter, it reached the number-one position across all formats (General, Latin and National).

== Awards and nominations ==
Awards and nominations for "Obsesión"
Year	Organization	Award	Result	Ref.
2024	Premios Gardel	Song of the Year	Won	
2024	Premios Gardel	Record of the Year	Nominated	
2024	Premios Gardel	Best Pop Song	Nominated	

== Charts ==
=== Weekly charts ===
Weekly chart performance for "Obsesión"
Chart (2023)	Peak position
Argentina Hot 100 (Billboard)	20
Argentina Airplay (Monitor Latino)	1
Argentina Latin Airplay (Monitor Latino)	1
Argentina National Songs (Monitor Latino)	1
Paraguay Pop Airplay (Monitor Latino)	13
Uruguay Airplay (Monitor Latino)	16
Uruguay Latin Airplay (Monitor Latino)	15

=== Year-end charts ===
2023 year-end chart performance for "Obsesión"
Chart (2023)	Position
Argentina Airplay (Monitor Latino)	11
Argentina Latin Airplay (Monitor Latino)	8
Bolivia Airplay (Monitor Latino)	83
Bolivia Latin Airplay (Monitor Latino)	77
Uruguay Airplay (Monitor Latino)	57
Uruguay Latin Airplay (Monitor Latino)	51
