= Lali (album) =

Studio album by Lali
- Released: 13 April 2023
- Recorded: November 2021 – January 2023
- Studio: Buenos Aires; Madrid; José Ignacio
- Genre: Pop; hyperpop; dance; EDM
- Length: 35:38
- Language: Spanish
- Label: Sony Argentina
- Producer: Mauro De Tommaso; Dano; Lex Luthorz; Jean Luka

Lali chronology
Libra (2020)	Lali (2023)	No Vayas a Atender Cuando el Demonio Llama (2025)

Singles from Lali
- 1. "Disciplina" Released: 12 January 2022; 2. "Diva" Released: 27 January 2022; 3. "Como Tú" Released: 10 February 2022; 4. "N5" Released: 22 June 2022; 5. "2 Son 3" Released: 25 August 2022; 6. "Motiveishon" Released: 11 November 2022; 7. "Cómprame un Brishito" Released: 1 March 2023; 8. "Obsesión" Released: 13 April 2023; 9. "Quiénes Son?" Released: 27 July 2023

Singles from Lali Deluxe
- 1. "Baum Baum" Released: 12 December 2023

Lali is the fifth studio album by Argentine singer Lali. It was released on 13 April 2023 by Sony Music Argentina. The album was mostly written by Lali, Galán and Mauro De Tommaso, who also produced it. An extended edition of the album including two new tracks was released on 12 December 2023.

The album marks Lali's comeback to her pop music origins after exploring Latin sounds like reggaeton and trap in her previous records Brava (2018) and Libra (2020). It stood out for revisiting multiple sounds and elements of the pop music from the late 1990s and early 2000s and for making numerous references to pop culture. It was defined by Lali as her "most personal and sincere album to date".

At the 26th Annual Premios Gardel, the album won the Best Pop Album award and was nominated for Album of the Year. During the ceremony, Lali also won Song of the Year for "Obsesión" and Best Music Video for "Quiénes Son?". This achievement made Lali's album the first in the history of the awards to produce two Best Music Video winners, having also won the previous year with "Disciplina". Additionally, "Obsesión" was nominated for Record of the Year and Best Pop Song, while the album's producers were nominated for Producer of the Year for their work on the album.

== Background ==
In November 2020 Lali released her fourth studio effort, Libra, her "most urban" one to date. The album found Lali looking for a balance between her signature pop sound, which she defined as her "essence", and new urban elements that she had been incorporating into her music since Brava (2018). With the COVID-19 restrictions still applying, the singer could not carry out a proper tour for Libra, so she decided to focus on acting and television projects. In 2021, she began filming the third season of Sky Rojo, the miniseries El Fin del Amor and the reality show competition La Voz Argentina.

Some time after, Lali met Mauro de Tommaso and Martín D'Agosto, also known as Galán. De Tommaso expressed that he had always wanted to work with Lali because he is a fan of Max Martin and the music he has produced for artists like Britney Spears, the Backstreet Boys, Katy Perry or Taylor Swift. He also was responsible for introducing Lali to Galán and inviting him to work together. Galán, a devoted fan of Spears, had always felt that there was no one in the mainstream Argentine music scene who did pop music. However, he started to pay attention to Lali when she debuted as a solo singer because she was doing that pop sound that he loved. Galán added: "as a gay person, I wanted to consume a diva [and] Lali fits that role very well: she sings well, dances well, and has an aesthetic interest. Her videos from her debut album are pop [and] very Britney [Spears]. Lali meets all the requirements of the diva fantasy for the gays". He also said that he connected perfectly with Lali from the very beginning because they both realized that they had grown up listening to the same music. The trio formed by Lali, Galán and De Tommaso named themselves "El Triunvirato del Pop" (Spanish for "the triumvirate of pop") and adopted the mission of taking the local pop to the level of what they always consumed from "foreigners".

Recordings for the album began as early as November 2021. De Tommaso admitted that it was him who proposed Lali to make an album like Blackout by Britney Spears. They did not want it to sound like Blackout, but they took it as an example of what Blackout meant for Spears: a change of sound, a transition. Both Galán and De Tommaso felt that, like Spears's album, Lali's fifth studio album had to represent "an expression of freedom after transiting her previous records in which she had to follow more instructions" and were already convinced that the album had to be Lali's self-titled album.

On 22 December 2021 Lali posted a 30-second video directed by Renderpanic which contained a snippet of what would become to be known as "Disciplina" and the words "Lali 2022", hinting that new music would come in the following year. In early 2022, Lali made her highly anticipated comeback to music by releasing a collection of singles consisting of "Disciplina", "Diva" and "Como Tú", all released with two weeks apart from each other. The songs had been recorded in 2021 between Buenos Aires and Madrid.

In April Lali announced that she would be touring in 2022 with her Disciplina Tour. The tour began on 23 June at the Luna Park Arena in Buenos Aires. Due to high demand, shows had to be added at Movistar Arena and eventually the fifty-thousand-seat José Amalfitani Stadium. With the latter, Lali became the first Argentine woman to sell out that stadium. The tour went on to sell out venues across Argentina, Chile, Uruguay, Spain and Israel.

Prior to the album's release, four more singles were released. In June 2022, Lali released "N5", which became one of her most successful songs, reaching the ninth-position on the Billboard Argentina Hot 100 and receiving a gold certification in the country. The singles that followed were "2 Son 3" in August, "Motiveishon" in November after the singer was a headliner at the 31st annual Buenos Aires Pride, and "Cómprame un Brishito" in March 2023. Lali released the latter as a gift for her fans who had been asking for it after it had been recorded and posted by guests at her 30th birthday a year before.

The album was finally announced on 30 March 2023 via Spotify through a countdown on her artist profile. She became the first Argentine artist to use the tool, generating an "unstoppable anticipation". The cover, tracklist and release date were also revealed that day when the album became available to pre-save on the platform. At last, the album was released on 13 April 2023 accompanied by its eighth single, "Obsesión".

== Concept and title ==
Regarding the theme of the album, [Lali] uncovers her most personal and omnipresent side with the ability to get over a heartbreak with her hand on her waist, but also giving value to her self-esteem and demanding her diamonds. Lali is an album to go out at night spreading glitter anywhere, with anyone, carelessly.

— Part of the album's description on Apple Music.

Lali is "an ode to pop [music]" in which the singer revisits many of the music influences that she was fed on throughout her life. Described as her "most pop album", it presents multiple sounds and elements of the pop music from the late 1990s and early 2000s. Among these, it is possible to identify the heavy influence of artists who dominated the period such as Britney Spears, NSYNC and Jennifer Lopez. In an interview with Rolling Stone, Lali referred to this influence: "It has a sound like that [of the early 2000s], but on purpose because that is what I feel. I am so that. I've danced that my entire life. It defines me a lot. Bringing that back to the present is the idea of this album".

The album was titled after Lali herself "not because of mere egocentric devotion" but because it is her "most sincere" one. In an interview with GQ, Lali said: "it is [the album] that represents me the most and, somehow, my entire path since I was a child". On a similar note, the singer expressed to Los 40 that she chose the title because "it closes a stage of [her] life" and added: "I am thirty-one [years old] and I wanted that stage and the path traveled to end" and that "this album defines that Lali who worked so hard to get to a fifth album".

=== Cover artwork ===
On 30 March 2023 Lali unveiled the album's cover art, aesthetic and release date through an official Spotify pre-save countdown. It features Lali in its center wearing a black leather coat and her hair tied with a bun while looking over her shoulder and standing on a zebra crossing and blurred buildings behind her. The cover is inspired in Avril Lavigne's debut studio album Let Go (2002), teasing the early 2000s influence of the album. Ignacio Ferreyra of XMAG magazine also noticed a resemblance with the music video of "2 Become 1" by the Spice Girls. Other than the singer, the word "Lali" written in all caps appears on the bottom right of the cover, while the parental advisory label can be seen on the upper left.

== Music and lyrics ==
Lali consists of thirteen tracks, with two of them being labelled explicit. The record marks Lali's first album to not contain any featured artist since Soy (2016). Musically, Lali is the singer's "most pop record in which she combines sounds of the 2000s with hyperpop, dance and EDM".

=== Writing and production ===
The album was written entirely by Lali, Galán, and Mauro De Tommaso. The trio named itself "El Triunvirato del Pop" (Spanish for "the triumvirate of pop"). Only "Disciplina" and "Diva" feature an additional writer, Dano. The album's production was entirely in charge of De Tommaso. Dano also serves as co-producer in the two tracks he helped writing, while Jean Luka co-produced "KO", and Lex Luthorz was involved in the production of "Diva". This reduced number of producers contrasts sharply with her previous record, Libra, for which Lali worked with different producers for every song. When asked about the production of Libra in a 2020 interview, Lali had said: "I decided to get into the studio everyday with a different producer, a different songwriter, with people that had different ideas from the composer of the day before, willing to make songs that are not similar to the music I made the days before".

Lyrically, the album "has to do with [Lali's] emotional and sexual-affective quest". In an October 2022 interview for Shangay, Lali had teased that the album was born from her night-life experiences and had a lot to do with having lived in Spain for some time, adding: "I met a quite-hyporcite-with-herself Lali who had a lot of fears and was censoring herself, so the album is a really sincere one which reflects my quest during all this time".

=== Songs ===
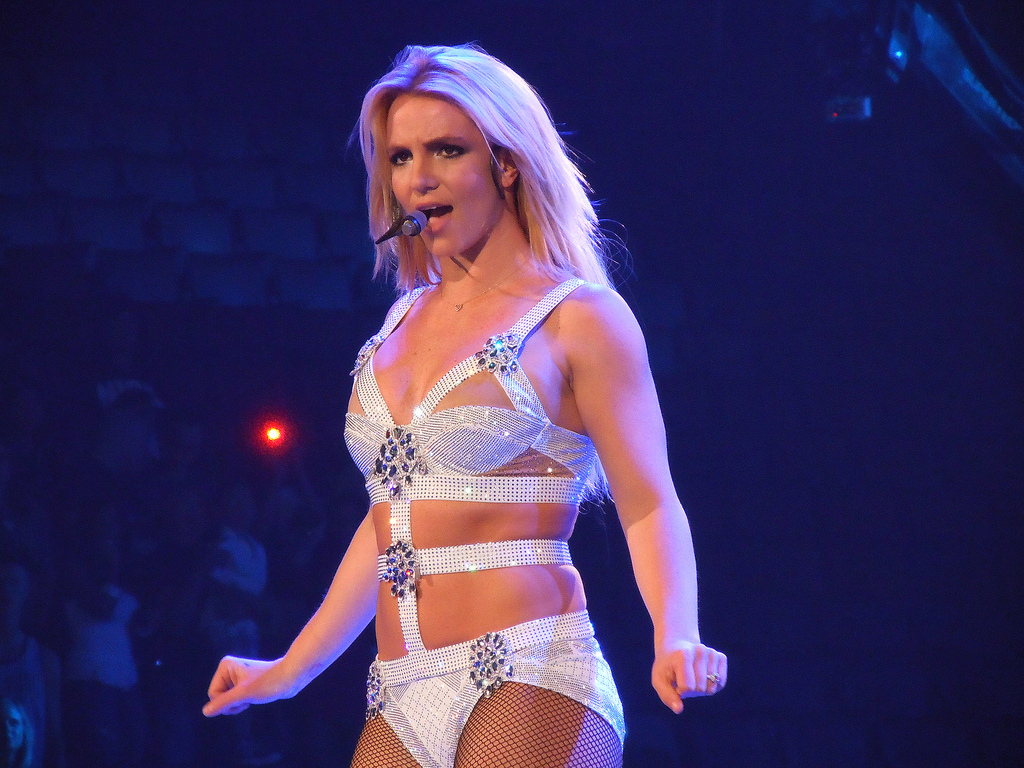
Britney Spears's voice is sampled in "Obsesión", while she is name-dropped in "Diva". She served as one of the main sources of inspiration for Lali.

Lali opens with "Obsesión" (English: "obsession"), a song in which she narrates a breakup with someone with whom she had a toxic relationship and who still chases her but she rejects. The song captures the intention of the album from the very beginning as the opening instrumental already resembles those popular early 2000s pop sounds. Among these, "Love Don't Cost a Thing" by Jennifer Lopez, "The Call" by the Backstreet Boys and "Bye Bye Bye" by NSYNC were perceived as influences. The song's most notorious reference is a sample to Britney Spears's "The Stop!" remix version of her 1998 song "(You Drive Me) Crazy" in the middle of its chorus. In the interlude, the song references Luis Miguel's 1996 song "Cómo Es Posible Que a Mi Lado" and a phrase said by Argentine pop icon Moria Casán in the TV show La Noche de Mirtha. At the same time, Lali talks to someone on the phone, which coincides with the man that called her asking for forgiveness in her 2014 song "Desamor" from her debut studio album A Bailar. The album's second track is "Disciplina" (English: "discipline"). The dance-pop single's "dark and sultry, hot and heavy" lyrics find Lali venturing into erotic practices known as BDSM, especially discipline, dominance and submission. The third track is "Cómprame un Brishito" (English: "buy me a little sparkle"). In Lali's words, the track is "an ironic joke to jewelry and cockiness". Its lyrics see Lali obsessed with gemstones, jewellery and diamonds. The song was compared to Rosalía's album Motomami because of its urban sounds.

In "KO" (short for "knockout"), Lali calls someone out for not being enough competition for her using several references to boxing. The song features background vocals by Argentine singer Ca7riel, who also was responsible of the guitar arrangements of the chorus. The record's fifth track, "2 Son 3" (English: "two are three"), is an electronic pop song with elements of rock music for which Lali took Shakira's and Paulina Rubio's pop-rock music as inspiration. Its lyrics find Lali preferring threesomes over monogamous sexual relationships. However, the singer suggested that a deeper look into its lyrics and music video hints at "mental repression, brainwashing, and the scarce freedom that we sometimes have to say what we want [and] what we like." The album continues with the "soulful" ballad "Incondicional" (English: "unconditional") which renders Lali's quest for a more sincere self-love and for a freer way of bonding with others. Having experienced toxic treatments in previous relationships like the one which inspired "Obsesión", Lali reflected upon what love is and what it should and should not be. In a radio interview, Lali confessed what the objective of her quest is:

"It is my dream to love in such a sane, good, non-selfish, sincere way, with my good and bad things. Humanity defines us. The pressure of being what the other needs to be happy is just too much. You have your problems [and] I have mine but we choose to be together and love each other uncondionally".

For the seventh track, "Quiénes Son? (English: "who are they?"), Lali sampled the same words said by Argentine pop icon Moria Casán. The song was described as "a sarcastic ode against online hate culture" The song begins with a voice recording by Casán while multiple of her catchphrases are referenced throughout the track. The eighth track on Lali is "Diva", a late-nineties/early-two-thousands-inspired song that references numerous iconic elements in pop culture and pays homage to some of the greatest divas of the music industry such as Marilyn Monroe, Britney Spears and Cher. "Diva" is a downtempo song that fuses pop, neo soul and R&B. Its lyrics find Lali ironically boasting about her often-acknowledged status of diva, a celebrated woman of outstanding talent in the world of popular music. Since the beginning of her career, the media has granted Lali the titles of "Pop Diva", "Queen of Argentine Pop", or "Current Queen of Latin Pop", among others. Nevertheless, Lali acknowledged that the world of a diva is a dangerous one since they can become void and isolated.

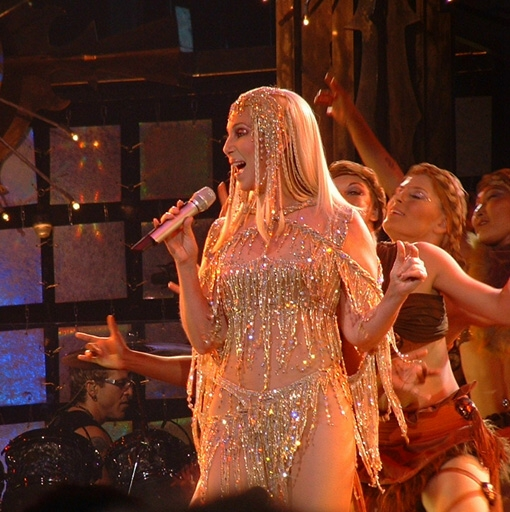
Cher is name-dropped and referenced in "Diva".

"N5" (short for "number five") is the album's ninth track and Lali's first song ever to portray a same-sex relationship after coming out as bisexual some years before. "N5" is a pop song with elements of house and flamenco which was inspired by an episode with Spanish singer Lola Índigo in which both artists were spotted kissing at a party. The song's title references the famous perfume Chanel No. 5 by Coco Chanel. The album's tenth track is "Ahora" (English: "now"). The song's "naughty", "mellow" and "lewd" lyrics find Lali completely mesmerized by the intimate relations she practices with a man and wanting to have sex with him right away.

The album's last three titles comprise the most EDM songs of the album. The eleventh track is "Motiveishon" (a hispanicization for "motivation"), an "electronic [song] in which the singer celebrates as the pop diva she is". At the 31st Annual Buenos Aires Pride, where Lali premiered the song, she said: "[It is] a song that inspires us to carry on, do the things we wish [and] go to the places that we were told we could not go but we can". Next is "Como Tú", another dance track in which the singer describes an irreplaceable feeling that she can get off only one thing. The album's closing title is "Sola" (English: "alone"). Described as "an electropop with smooth and opaque finishes", the song revolves around anonymity. Lali confessed that she is used to going out, sometimes by herself, in places where she is not so well-known and connect with people. Referring to the song as a "real experience", she said: "we are surrounded by noises, cellphones [and] social networks, and we are moving all the time. This track is about me being alone. I can have a great time anyways, I go to a bar where no one knows who I am but suddenly you connect with someone who is also having a drink" and concluded that "it is about being alone, not about feeling lonely". Finally, Lali confessed that the song's instrumental outro functions as an open door and a slit to spy on what her future music will sound like.

== Reception ==
=== Critical reception ===
In a positive review for Rolling Stone, Juana Giaimo wrote: "Lali is an album full of passion—passion for dancing, sexual passion, artistic passion; no matter what, her voice overflows with energy and, chiefly, voracity". She also called it an "ambitious" album because "it goes over the different slopes of pop [music]" and "its lyrics are also about being ambitious, getting higher and having a joyful life". Similarly, Lupe Torres of La Nación said that the album "aims at sounding fresh and displays an artistic proposal with an attractive aesthetic and a mesmerizing choreography" while naming Lali the "queen of Argentine pop". After reviewing the album, El Comercio also called Lali the "Argentine queen of pop". Belén Fourment of El País compared Lali's fifth album to the end a of treasure hunt, saying: "If what [Lali] had been building since her debut album A Bailar was a persistent path, sometimes erratic but always determined, of internal digging and insistence, Lali is the chest with everything that is inside: an album like an identity that embraces the references, acknowledges the pillars and, from them, stands on its singularity".

=== Commercial performance ===
Even prior to its release, the album debuted at the top of the Uruguayan Albums chart on its March issue. The album achieved that within only one tracking week consisting purely of pre-sales. While remaining at the number one position on the April issue of the Uruguayan chart, it also boosted Lali's fourth studio album Libra to make its debut on the chart at number sixteen. In Argentina, the album debuted directly at the top of the Argentine Albums chart within just three tracking days. Lali remained at the top for six consecutive weeks. The album became the first album by an Argentine female artist to top the chart since Lali's own Libra in 2020.

== Awards and nominations ==
Awards and nominations for Lali
Year	Organization	Award	Result	Ref.
2024	Premios Gardel	Album of the Year	Nominated	
2024	Premios Gardel	Best Pop Album	Won	
2024	Premios Gardel	Producer of the Year	Nominated	

== Track listing ==
All tracks are written by Mariana Espósito, Martín D'Agosto and Mauro De Tommaso, and produced by the latter, except where noted.

Lali – Standard edition
No.	Title	Writer(s)	Producer(s)	Length
1.	"Obsesión"			3:11
2.	"Disciplina"	Espósito; D'Agosto; De Tommaso; Danilo Amerise	De Tommaso; Dano	2:37
3.	"Cómprame un Brishito"			2:24
4.	"KO"		De Tommaso; Jean Luka	2:51
5.	"2 Son 3"			2:45
6.	"Incondicional"			2:32
7.	"Quiénes Son?"			2:42
8.	"Diva"	Espósito; D'Agosto; De Tommaso; Amerise	De Tommaso; Dano; Lex Luthorz	3:06
9.	"N5"			2:34
10.	"Ahora"			2:36
11.	"Motiveishon"			2:38
12.	"Como Tú"			2:46
13.	"Sola"			2:50
Total length:				35:38

Lali – Deluxe edition
No.	Title	Length
5.	"Baum Baum"	2:34
14.	"Corazón Perdido"	3:04
Total length:		41:17

Notes

- "Obsesión" samples Britney Spears's "The Stop!" remix version of her 1998 song "(You Drive Me) Crazy".
- The deluxe edition lists "Baum Baum" in between "KO" and "2 Son 3", and "Corazón Perdido" in between "Como Tú" and "Sola".

== Personnel ==
Musicians

- Lali – vocals
- Martín D'Agosto – background vocals (tracks 1–4, 6–13)
- Mauro De Tommaso – keyboards (all tracks), programming (1, 3–13), guitar (1, 4–13), drums (2, 9), percussion (9)
- Danilo Amerise Díaz – keyboards (2), drums (8)
- Bela Di Iorio – background vocals (1)
- Vir Modica – background vocals (1)
- Brian Taylor – guitar (2, 8, 12)
- Ca7riel – background vocals, guitar (4)
- Caterina Finocchi – background vocals (6)
- Claudia Alejandra Tapia – background vocals (6)
- Iván Vicente Borda – background vocals (6)
- Laura Herrera Ferreirós – background vocals (6)
- Juan Giménez – bass guitar (8)

Technical

- Lewis Pickett – mixing (all tracks), mastering (1, 3–7, 9–11, 13)
- Javier Fracchia – mastering (2, 8, 12)
- Mauro De Tommaso – engineering
- Javier Caso – engineering
- Brian Taylor – engineering (2, 12)
- Juan Giménez – performance arrangement (1)

== Charts ==
Weekly chart performance for Lali
Chart (2023)	Peak position
Argentine Albums (CAPIF)	1
Uruguayan Albums (CUD)	1

== Release history ==
Release formats for Lali
Region	Date	Format(s)	Edition	Label
Various	13 April 2023	Digital download; streaming	Standard	Sony Music Argentina
Argentina	13 April 2023	CD	Standard	Sony Music Argentina
Uruguay	13 April 2023	CD	Standard	Sony Music Argentina
Various	12 December 2023	Digital download; streaming	Deluxe	Sony Music Argentina
Argentina	13 December 2023	Vinyl LP	Deluxe	Sony Music Argentina
