= Disciplina (song) =

2022 single by Lali

Single by Lali

from the album Lali
- Language: Spanish
- English title: "Discipline"
- Released: 12 January 2022
- Recorded: 2021
- Genre: Dance-pop
- Length: 2:37
- Label: Sony
- Songwriters: Mariana Espósito; Daniel Amarise Diaz; Martín D'Agosto; Mauro De Tommaso
- Producers: Dano; Mauro De Tommaso

Lali singles chronology
"Gente en la Calle" (2021)	"Disciplina" (2022)	"Diva" (2022)

Music video
- "Disciplina" on YouTube

"Disciplina" (transl. "discipline") is a song recorded by Argentine singer Lali. The song was released by Sony Music Argentina on January 12, 2022, as the lead single from Lali's fifth studio album, Lali (2023). The song was written by Lali, Martín D'Agosto, Dano, and Mauro De Tommaso, and produced by the latter two.

The song received a nomination for Hottest Choreography (which stands for Best Choreography) at the Premios Juventud of 2022. Meanwhile, its music video won Best Music Video at the 2023 Gardel Awards.

== Composition ==
Described as "sexy, energetic and catchy", "Disciplina" is an uptempo song blending pop and dance beats. The song marks Lali's comeback to her pop music origins after exploring Latin sounds like reggaeton and trap in her previous records Brava and Libra. Its "dark and sultry, hot and heavy" lyrics see Lali venturing into erotic practices known as BDSM, especially discipline, dominance and submission.

== Music video ==
The "blood red-hued" accompanying music video for "Disciplina" was released along with the song on January 12, 2022. The video was directed by Renderpanic and produced by The Movement, and it depicts Lali as a dominatrix. The clip, which is inspired in Berlin's raves, takes place on a "gigantic" industrial set in which a dancefloor was set up where Lali and a group of dancers of different genres perform an "electric" choreography that gradually raises the temperature of the place, until they end up exhausted on the ground. The video was compared to Rihanna's "Disturbia" and Lady Gaga's "Bad Romance". Bradley Stern of MuuMuse wrote that "there's no doubt Lali is a student of Britney [Spears], as the throbbing tune and searing hot visual supply shades of everything from the "I'm a Slave 4 U" orgies to Blackout to "Work Bitch". There's a little Rihanna Rated R dominatrix edge and Miley [Cyrus]'s "Wrecking Ball" with the giant chain, too."

== Live performances ==
Lali performed "Disciplina" live for the first time during the 9th Annual Platino Awards on May 1, 2022. Lali, who also hosted the ceremony alongside Miguel Ángel Muñoz, "showed all her talent," and once the performance was over "the standing ovation was inevitable".

== Charts ==
Chart (2022)	Peak position
Argentina Hot 100 (Billboard)	34
Argentina Airplay (Monitor Latino)	16
Argentina Latin Airplay (Monitor Latino)	14
Argentina National Songs (Monitor Latino)	7
