= Abre (album) =

Studio album by Fito Páez
- Released: July 27, 1999
- Recorded: 1999
- Studio: Circo Beat Studios, Buenos Aires
- Genre: Latin rock
- Length: 71:56
- Label: Warner Music Argentina
- Producer: Phil Ramone

Fito Páez chronology
Enemigos Íntimos (1998)	Abre (1999)	Rey Sol (2000)

Singles from Abre
- 1. "Al Lado del Camino" Released: 1999

Abre (English: Open) is the eight solo studio album and tenth overall by Argentine singer Fito Páez, released on July 27, 1999, through Warner Music Argentina. It was produced by Phil Ramone.

At the 1st Annual Latin Grammy Awards, the album was nominated for Best Rock Album while the song "Al Lado del Camino" was nominated for Song of the Year and won Best Rock Song and Best Male Rock Vocal Performance, Frank Filipetti also received a nomination for Best Engineered Album for his work as engineer and mixer in the album. Additionally, the album was nominated for Best Latin Rock/Alternative Album at the 43rd Annual Grammy Awards, being Páez first Grammy Award nomination, and only until his win for La Conquista del Espacio in 2021 in the same category. Abre was also nominated for Album of the Year at the Premios Gardel in 2000 while Phil Ramone was nominated for Producer of the Year for his work in the album.

The album was certified platinum in Argentina in 2000 after selling over 40,000 copies.

== Background ==
The album was recorded at Circo Beat Studios and was the first solo album by Páez since Circo Beat, released in 1994, prior to Abre, Páez worked in Enemigos Íntimos, a collaborative album with Spanish musician Joaquín Sabina. Abre was premiered at Teatro Maipo in Buenos Aires, Argentina, where Páez performed the songs from the album alongside musicians such as Guillermo Vadalá, Nicolás Ibarburu, Gonzalo Aloras, Claudio Cardone, Emmanuel Cauvet, Carlos Huerta, Juan Larrinaga and Adrián Elizarde. To promote the album, Páez embarked on a tour through Argentina that started on August 21, 1999, in Rosario, Santa Fe, his hometown, and included a concert at Teatro Gran Rex in Buenos Aires.

== Critical reception ==
Professional ratings
Review scores
Source	Rating
AllMusic	3/5 stars

Iván Adaime from AllMusic gave the album three out of five stars calling it a "sophisticated and lushly arranged pop album", he also highlighted the title track as one of the memorable moments from the album, he finished the review writing that "apart from El Amor Después del Amor and Tercer Mundo, Abre is the best album recorded by Páez in the '90s".

== Track listing ==
All tracks were written by Fito Páez and produced by Phil Ramone.

Abre track listing
No.	Title	Length
1.	"Abre (Open)"	6:42
2.	"Al Lado del Camino (By the Side of the Road)"	5:26
3.	"Dos en la Ciudad (Two in the City)"	5:42
4.	"Es Sólo Cuestión de Actitud (It's Just a Matter of Attitude)"	4:48
5.	"La Casa Desaparecida (The Vanished House)"	11:28
6.	"Tu Sonrisa Inolvidable (Your Unforgettable Smile)"	5:20
7.	"Desierto (Wilderness)"	7:19
8.	"Torre de Cristal (Crystal Tower)"	4:04
9.	"Havana"	5:47
10.	"Ahi Voy (There I Go)"	5:53
11.	"La Despedida (The Farewell)"	4:57
12.	"La Buena Estrella (The Good Star)"	4:26
Total length:		71:56

== Credits ==
=== Musicians ===
- Fito Páez – composition, arrangements, vocals, piano, keyboards
- Claudio Cardone – arrangements (track 3), keyboards
- Rob Mounsey – arrangements (tracks 3, 9)
- Rob Mathes – arrangements (tracks 4, 5, 10)
- Guillermo Vidalá – arrangements (track 5), bass, guitar, keyboards
- Lucho González – arrangements (track 6), guitar
- Anita Alvarez de Toledo – backing vocals (tracks 1, 8)
- Néstor Marconi – bandoneon (track 5)
- Shawn Pelton – drums, loop
- Gabriel Carambula – guitar
- Ulises Butrón – guitar
- Ube Reyes – percussion (track 6)

=== Technical ===
- Phil Ramone – producer
- Frank Filipetti – engineer, mixing
- Ted Jensen – mastering
- Brian Garten – assistant engineer
- Marcelo Infante – assistant engineer
- Mariano Rodríguez – assistant engineer
- Alejandro Ros – design
- Eduardo Martí – photography
