= 23rd Annual Premios Gardel =

2021 Argentine music awards ceremony

- Date: July 23, 2021
- Country: Argentina
- Hosted by: Jey Mammón; Eleonora Pérez Caressi

Highlights
- Most awards: Fito Páez (4); Nathy Peluso (4)
- Most nominations: Nathy Peluso (9)
- Website: premiosgardel.org.ar

Television/radio coverage
- Network: TNT Latin America; LRA Radio Nacional

The 23rd Annual Premios Gardel ceremony was held on July 23, 2021, and it was presented with no in-person ceremony due to the COVID-19 pandemic. The television broadcast of the show was in charge of the TNT Latin America, while LRA Radio Nacional provided radio coverage. The ceremony recognized the best recordings, compositions, and artists of the eligibility year, which ran from January 1, 2020 to January 31, 2020. The nominations were announced on May 7, 2021. The ceremony was hosted by television personalities Jey Mammón and Eleonora Pérez Caressi.

Nathy Peluso received the most nominations, with nine, followed by Fito Páez and Bizarrap with six each. The list of performers was unveiled on July 16, 2021, and consisted of forty-two artists including headliners Fito Páez, Cazzu, Ciro y los Persas, Soledad, Luciano Pereyra, María Becerra, David Lebón, Miranda! and Abel Pintos. Moreover, Spanish singer Pablo Alborán and Mexican singer Carlos Rivera were announced as special acts.

Nathy Peluso and Fito Páez won the most awards of the night, with four each. Peluso's wins included Record of the Year for her album Calambre and Best New Artist, while Páez's included Album of the Year (Gardel de Oro Award) and Best Rock Album for La Conquista del Espacio. The Song of the Year award went to Lali and Cazzu for their song "Ladrón".

== Nominees ==
Nominees and winners were taken from the Gardel Awards website. Winners appear first and highlighted in Bold.

=== General field ===
Album of the Year

- **La Conquista del Espacio – Fito Páez**
- Ya No Mires Atrás – Luis Alberto Spinetta
- Calambre – Nathy Peluso

Song of the Year

- **"Ladrón" – Lali & Cazzu**
- "Piedra Libre" – Abel Pintos
- "Suficiente" – Babasónicos
- "Que No" – Barbi Recanati
- "Nathy Peluso: Bzrp Music Sessions, Vol. 36" – Bizarrap & Nathy Peluso
- "Amanece" – Diego Torres, Macaco & Villamizar featuring Catalina García
- "La Canción de las Bestias" – Fito Páez
- "Juntos para Siempre" – Los Auténticos Decadentes
- "Colocao" – Nicki Nicole
- "Ella Dice" – Tini & Khea

Record of the Year

- **"Buenos Aires" – Nathy Peluso**
  - **Rafa Arcaute, producer; Mariano López, Rafa Arcaute, Didi Gutman, Maddox Chhim & Felipe Tichauer, engineer**
- "Como La Cigarra" – Elena Roger & Escalandrum
  - Horacio Sarria, Mariano Uccello & Mercedes Otero, producers; Facundo Rodriguez, engineer
- "Me Enamoré de Ti" – Luciano Pereyra & Lang Lang
  - Luciano Pereyra, producer; Dario Pacheco, engineer

Best New Artist

- **Calambre – Nathy Peluso**
- Atrevido – Trueno
- Mi Primer Día Triste – Zoe Gotusso

Collaboration of the Year

- **"Bohemio" – Andrés Calamaro & Julio Iglesias**
- "Como La Cigarra" – Elena Roger & Escalandrum
- "Gente en la Calle" – Fito Páez featuring Lali
- "Me Enamoré de Ti" – Luciano Pereyra & Lang Lang
- "Un Beso en Madrid" – Tini & Alejandro Sanz

=== Pop ===
Best Pop Album

- **Mi Primer Día Triste – Zoe Gotusso**
- Libra – Lali
- Tini Tini Tini – Tini

Best Pop Group Album

- **Paranoia Pop – Bandalos Chinos**
- Tándem – Mavi Díaz & Germán Dominicé
- El Reflejo – Rayos Láser

=== Rock ===
Best Rock Album

- **La Conquista del Espacio – Fito Páez**
- Guerras (Un Viaje en el Tiempo) – Ciro y los Persas
- Errores Coleccionables – Sol Bassa

Best Rock Group Album

- **Es Así – Las Pelotas**
- 2020 – Las Pastillas del Abuelo
- El Último Abrazo Analógico – Todo Aparenta Normal

Best Hard Rock/Punk Album

- **Carne, Tierras y Sangre – Pilsen**
- Sr. Punk – Mal Momento
- Liberarse y Existir – Tano Romano

=== Urban/Reggae ===
Best Urban/Trap Song or Album

- **"Nathy Peluso: Bzrp Music Sessions, Vol. 36" – Bizarrap & Nathy Peluso**
- Una Niña Inútil – Cazzu<
- "High (Remix)" – María Becerra, Tini & Lola Indigo
- "Colocao" – Nicki Nicole
- "Mamichula – Trueno, Nicki Nicole & Bizarrap

Best Urban/Trap Collaboration

- **"Mamichula – Trueno, Nicki Nicole & Bizarrap**
- "Goteo (Remix)" – Duki, Ronny J & Pablo Chill-E featuring Capo Plaza & C.R.O
- "Verte" – Nicki Nicole, Dread Mar I & Bizarrap

Best Raggae/Ska Album

- **Flores y Burbujas – El Natty Combo**
- El Presente que Soñamos Dub – Kameleba & Don Camel
- Continentes – La Estafa Dub

=== Tango ===
Best Tango Album

- **La bella indiferencia – Mariana Mazú**
- Génesis – Carolina Minella
- Tango – Cristian Palacios

Best Instrumental/Tango Group or Orchestra Album

- **Tango Improvisado – José Colángelo & Franco Luciani**
- Cruces Urbanos, Vol. 2 – Quinteto Negro La Boca
- Reinventango – Tanghetto

=== Folk ===
Best Folklore Album

- **Abrazo – Luciana Jury**
- Entre Risa – Bruno Arias
- Veinteveinte – Suna Rocha

Best Folklore Group Album

- **Ahyre – Ahyre**
- Desde Adentro – Los del Portezuelo
- Tierra Mía – Los Tekis

Best Chamamé Album

- **Hielo Azul Tierra Roja – Chango Spasiuk & Per Einar Watle**
- Mujer de Chamamé – Marcia Müller
- Con Ritmo y Alegría – Milagrito Gómez

=== Tropical/Cuarteto ===
Best Tropical Album

- **Es Lo Que Hay – El Dipy**
- El Último Romántico – Daniel Cardozo
- Otra Vez, Dando Clase – Román El Original

Best Tropical Group Album

- **De Buenos Aires para el Mundo – Los Ángeles Azules**
- Seguimos – Amar Azul
- Sesiones Musikeras – Mala Fama

Best Cuarteto Album

- **Aprender a Volar – Magui Olave**
- Música en Cuarentena – Luis Sebastián
- Un Sueño Hecho Realidad – Walter Salinas

Best Cuarteto Group Album

- **El Mismo Aire – La K'onga**
- Mundo Streaming – Q'Lokura
- Desde El Encierro – Sabroso

=== Alternative ===
Best Alternative Pop Album

- **Calambre – Nathy Peluso**
- Otro Lado – Rosario Ortega
- Existo – Sol Pereyra

Best Alternative Rock Album

- **Ubicación en Tiempo Real – Barbi Recanati**
- Los Años Futuros – 1915
- Lapsus – Zero Kill

Best Alternative Folklore Album

- **Renacer – Nahuel Pennisi**
- Parte de Mí – Soledad
- Triángula – Triángula

=== Dance/Electronic ===
Best Electronic Music Album

- **Reworked – Willy Crook**
- Pleasures – Mo.NA
- Venus – Mistol Team

=== Romantic/Melodic ===
Best Romantic/Melodic Album

- **60 Años con la Música ¡Gracias! – Dany Martin**
- Tal Como Soy – Dany Vila
- Desierto – Germán Barceló

=== Classical ===
Best Classical Album

- **Debussy Preludios para el Piano – Haydée Schvartz**
- Villa-Lobos – Daniela Salinas
- Territorios: Paisaje Latinoamericano en el Piano – Fernanda Morello

=== Jazz ===
Best Jazz Album

- **Malosetti & la Colonia – Javier Malosetti**
- Sin Tiempo – Leo Genovese, Mariano Otero & Sergio Verdinelli
- Apaláp! – Oscar Giunta Supertrío!

=== Instrumental/Fusion/World Music ===
Best Instrumental/Fusion/World Music Album

- **Solo Piano: Reflexiones – Lito Vitale**
- Hikkikomori – La Chicana
- Latineses – La Orquestonga

=== Live ===
Best Live Album

- **Foro Sol – Los Auténticos Decadentes**
- Mujeres Argentinas, 50 Años (En Vivo en el CCK) – La Bruja Salguero & Facundo Ramírez
- En Vivo Teatro Gran Rex – Rodrigo Tapari

=== Singer-Songwriting ===
Best Singer-Songwriting Album

- **Criptograma – Lisandro Aristimuño**
- Reset – Celli
- Basta de Música – Martín Buscaglia

=== Children ===
Best Children's Album

- **El Reino del Revés – Elena Roger & Escalandrum**
- Topa, Una Navidad Especial – Diego Topa
- La Tarara: Canciones Tradicionales – Mariana Baggio & Martin Telechansk

=== Music for Visual Media ===
Best Cinema/Television/Audiovisual Production Soundtrack Album

- **The Last of Us Part II – Gustavo Santaolalla**
- Notas de Paso 4 – Ernesto Snajer
- Vilas: Serás lo que Debas Ser, o No Serás Nada – Vandera

=== Historical ===
Best Catalog Collection Album

- **Agujero Interior – Virus**
- Piazzolla – Buenos Aires 8
- Santaolalla (Remasterizado 2020) – Gustavo Santaolalla

=== Archival Concept ===
Best Conceptual Album

- **Ya No Mires Atrás – Luis Alberto Spinetta**
- Una Niña Inútil – Cazzu
- Oasis – Daniel Melingo
- Como La Cigarra – Elena Roger & Escalandrum

=== Production ===
Producer of the Year

- **La Conquista del Espacio – Fito Páez**
  - **Fito Páez, Diego Olivero & Gustavo Borner, producers**
- Ahyre – Ahyre
  - Juan José Vasconcellos & Sebastián Choque, producers
- Calambre – Nathy Peluso
  - Rafa Arcaute, producer

=== Recording Engineering ===
Best Recording Engineering

- **La Conquista del Espacio – Fito Páez**
  - **Gustavo Borner, Phil Levine, Justin Moshkevich & Diego Olivero, recording engineers**
- Caligaris Sinfónico – Los Caligaris
  - Pablo Chapur, recording engineer
- "Como La Cigarra" – Elena Roger & Escalandrum
  - Facundo Rodriguez, recording engineer

=== Cover Design ===
Best Cover Design

- **Criptograma – Lisandro Aristimuño**
  - **Valentín López López & Lisandro Aristimuño, graphic designers**
- Una Niña Inútil – Cazzu
  - Segundo Paladino, graphic designer
- Calambre – Nathy Peluso
  - Albert Romagosa, graphic designer

=== Music Video/Film ===
Best Music Video

- **"Todo Esto" – Kevin Johansen featuring David Lebón**
  - **Bruno Adamovsky, director**
- "Nathy Peluso: Bzrp Music Sessions, Vol. 36" – Bizarrap & Nathy Peluso
  - Bizarrap, director
- "Ciudad Extraña" – Moris & Antonio Birabent
  - Augusto González Polo, director

Best DVD

- **Almendra I - 50 Años – Almendra**
  - **Diego Latorre, director**
- Niguiri Sessions – Dante Spinetta
  - Niko Sedano, director
- Placer – Paula Maffía
  - Emiliano Romero, director

== Multiple nominations and awards ==
The following received multiple nominations:

Nine:

- Nathy Peluso

Six:

- Bizarrap
- Fito Páez

Five:

- Escalandrum
- Elena Roger
- Nicki Nicole

Four:

- Cazzu
- Tini

Three:

- Lali
- Trueno

Two:

- Ahyre
- Barbi Recanati
- Gustavo Santaolalla
- Lang Lang
- Lisandro Aristimuño
- Los Auténticos Decadentes
- Luciano Pereyra
- Luis Alberto Spinetta
- Zoe Gotusso

The following received multiple awards:
Four:

- Fito Páez
- Nathy Peluso

Two:

- Bizarrap
- Lisandro Aristimuño
