= No Sé Si Es Baires o Madrid =

No Sé Si es Baires o Madrid

Live album by Fito Páez
- Released: June 23, 2009
- Recorded: April 24, 2008 at the Palacio de los Congresos, Madrid
- Genre: Latin pop, Rock en Español
- Label: RCA
- Producer: Fito Páez, Carlos García

Fito Páez chronology
| Rodolfo (2007) | No Sé Si es Baires o Madrid (2009) | Confiá (2010) |

No Sé Si es Baires o Madrid (Don't Know if it is 'Buenos Aires' or Madrid) is the third live album by Argentine recording artist Fito Páez. Released by RCA Records on June 23, 2009, it was recorded before a live audience at the Palacio de los Congresos in Madrid, Spain, on April 24, 2008. The album includes featured performances by Pereza, Diego del Morao, Sabú, Dani Noel, Joaquín Sabina, Pablo Milanés, Ariel Rot, Gala Évora, Marlango, Mavi Díaz and Coki.

To promote the album, Páez released "Contigo", a duet with Joaquín Sabina, which was their first joint performance in ten years. They recorded Enemigos Intimos in 1998. The album received positive reviews, earned Páez a Latin Grammy for Best Male Pop Vocal Album, and was certified gold in Argentina.

== Background ==
Fito Páez recorded No Sé Si es Baires o Madrid, his third live album, following Euforia (1999) and Mi Vida con Ellas (2005), at the Palacio de los Congresos in Madrid on April 24, 2008. Initially, Páez did not plan to release the performance for sale, but after realizing that "the show was beautiful", opted for the release. The album title is a phrase from the song "Petalo de Sal", included on Páez' El Amor Después del Amor, and also from the singer's sentiment of having Joaquín Sabina share the stage with him. Sabina and Páez recorded Enemigos Intimos in 1998, with both singers' fighting during the album recording sessions. Afterward Sabina did not speak to Páez for more than 10 years. After their reconciliation in Argentina, they played together in some concerts, and when Paez' team made phone calls to see who wanted to participate in the album, Sabina agreed.

== Repertoire ==
Páez recorded the album alone on-stage with his piano; half the selections are duets with Spanish and Cuban performers. Eight tracks are taken from El Amor Después del Amor (the title track, "Dos Días en la Vida", "Pétalo de Sal", "Un Vestido y un Amor", "Tumbas de la Gloria", "La Rueda Mágica", "Creo", "Brillante Sobre el Mic"); "Mariposa Tecknicolor" from Circo Beat; "11 y 6" and "Dar es Dar" were first included on Euforia; "Al Lado del Camino" was recorded for Abre; "Contigo" is a song written by Joaquín Sabina.

== Reception ==
Professional ratings
Review scores
| Source | Rating |
|---|---|
| Allmusic | 3/5 stars |

The album received positive reviews. Mariano Prunes of Allmusic said that Páez's rethinking of his own work is always worthy of attention, and the album is "an evening with the singer, his piano, his (Madrid) friends, and his songs." Prunes also praised "Contigo", a duet with Joaquín Sabina, and "Yo Vengo a Ofrecer Mi Corazón" with Pablo Milanés. He said Páez's creative and intriguing readings of his classics keeps things interesting, while his guests compound the emotional effect of the performance. Páez earned a Latin Grammy for Best Male Pop Vocal Album. No Sé Si es Baires o Madrid received a gold certification in Argentina.

== Track listing ==
This track listing adapted from Allmusic and liner notes.

| No. | Title | Writer(s) | Length |
|---|---|---|---|
| 1. | "11 y 6" | Fito Páez | 3:56 |
| 2. | "Tumbas de la Gloria [Glory Graves]" | Páez | 4:44 |
| 3. | "La Rueda Mágica [The Magical Wheel]" (featuring Pereza) | Charly García, Páez | 4:16 |
| 4. | "Eso Que Llevas Ahí [That Thing You're Holding]" | Páez | 3:44 |
| 5. | "El Amor Después del Amor [Love After Love]" | Páez | 1:49 |
| 6. | "Dos Días en la Vida [Two Days In The Life]" (featuring Diego del Morao, Sabú and Dani Noel) | Páez | 4:39 |
| 7. | "Contigo [With You]" (featuring Joaquín Sabina) | Sabina | 4:04 |
| 8. | "Brillante Sobre el Mic [Brilliant On The Mic]" | Páez | 4:48 |
| 9. | "Yo Vengo a Ofrecer Mi Corazón [I Come Here To Offer My Heart]" (featuring Pablo Milanés) | Páez | 4:25 |
| 10. | "Giros [Twists]" (featuring Ariel Rot) | Páez | 3:33 |
| 11. | "Al Lado del Camino [On One Side Of The Road]" | Páez | 7:12 |
| 12. | "Un Vestido y un Amor [One Dress and One Love]" (featuring Gala Évora) | Páez | 4:37 |
| 13. | "La Rumba del Piano [Piano's Rumble]" (featuring Diego del Morao, Sabú and Dani Noel) | Páez | 5:57 |
| 14. | "Pétalo de Sal [Salted Petal]" (featuring Marlango) | Páez | 2:52 |
| 15. | "Dar es Dar [To Give is To Give]" (featuring Ariel Rot, Marlango, Pereza, Gala Evora, Mavi Díaz and Coki) | Páez | 3:39 |
| 16. | "Mariposa Tecknicolor [Tecknicolor Butterfly]" | Páez | 5:38 |

DVD track listing
| No. | Title | Writer(s) | Length |
|---|---|---|---|
| 1. | "11 y 6" | Fito Páez | 3:56 |
| 2. | "Eso Que Llevas Ahí" | Páez | 3:44 |
| 3. | "Tumbas de la Gloria" | Páez | 4:44 |
| 4. | "El Amor Después del Amor" | Páez | 1:49 |
| 5. | "Dos Días en la Vida" (featuring Diego del Morao, Sabú and Dani Noel) | Páez | 4:39 |
| 6. | "La Rumba del Piano" (featuring Diego del Morao, Sabú and Dani Noel) | Páez | 5:57 |
| 7. | "El Cuarto de al Lado" | Páez | 5:00 |
| 8. | "Pétalo de Sal" (featuring Marlango) | Páez | 2:52 |
| 9. | "Creo" (featuring Marlango) | Páez | 4:30 |
| 10. | "Giros" (featuring Ariel Rot) | Páez | 3:33 |
| 11. | "Al Lado del Camino" | Páez | 7:12 |
| 12. | "La Rueda Mágica" (featuring Pereza) | Charly García, Páez | 4:16 |
| 13. | "Ciudad de Pobres Corazones" | Páez | 3:33 |
| 14. | "Contigo" (featuring Joaquín Sabina) | Sabina | 4:04 |
| 15. | "Brillante Sobre el Mic" | Páez | 4:48 |
| 16. | "Un Vestido y un Amor" (featuring Gala Évora) | Páez | 4:37 |
| 17. | "Y Dale Alegría a Mi Corazón" (featuring Gala Évora and Mavi Díaz) | Páez | 4:47 |
| 18. | "Yo Vengo a Ofrecer Mi Corazón" (featuring Pablo Milanés) | Páez | 4:25 |
| 19. | "Dar es Dar" (featuring Ariel Rot, Marlango, Pereza, Gala Evora, Mavi Díaz and Coki) | Páez | 3:39 |
| 20. | "Mariposa Tecknicolor" | Páez | 5:38 |

== Personnel ==
- Fito Páez – main performer, producer, vocals, lyricist, composer
- Carlos Garcia – art coordinator, producer
- Carlos Altolaguirre – sound engineer
- Alejandro Avalis – production coordination
- Gustavo Borner – mastering
- Carlos Martos Wensell – engineer
- Paco Martin – A&R
- Rafa Vila – A&R
- Alejandro Ros – graphic design
- Rubén Martín – photography
