= Soy Celesté =

Soy Celesté is a Chicana feminist punk band based in Denver, Colorado founded by vocalist and guitarist Celesté Martinez. Martinez was born in Santa Cruz, California and raised in San Antonio, Texas, and has been based in Denver since 2011. Martinez describes music and community as inseparable aspects of healing, resistance, and queerness. Soy Celesté, consisting of Martinez along with Stevie Guthrie on bass and Saladin Thomas on drums, has been performing since 2022.

== History ==
Celesté Martinez, a classically trained musician, has noted that the band's name, Soy Celesté, translates from Spanish to English as "I am Celesté," and thus serves as a declaration that Martinez's "whole existence as a Brown, Fat, Femme, Queer, Chicana person living in the United States is political because of our mainstream culture," according to the band's website. Martinez also identifies as Mestiza, both of Indigenous (Cherokee and Nahua) and of Spanish descent.

The band's first full-length album was released in August 2024 and was titled, Feminista Manifestó, highlighting Chicanx history and feminism. The band also released an official music video, Machista, in July 2024. In 2024, they performed at the Community Roots Arts Festival that supports Colorado-based creatives of color and at Denver's 25-year Underground Music Showcase as well as with several local Colorado festivals including FoCoMX (Fort Collins), Lafayette Music Festival, and the Trinidad Arts Festival, and were featured in the Movimiento Music series at the D3 Arts community venue in the historically Latino Westwood neighborhood of Denver, a concert series funded by a grant from Denver Arts & Venue as part of an archival project with History Colorado. They also opened for the Norwegian indie rock group Ask Carol and the Mexican punk metal pop female sextet Descartes a Kant.

In September 2025, they performed as part of SarahFest, a BIPOC (Black Indigenous and People of Color) festival, a performance that led Queen City Sounds and Art writer/editor Tom Murphy to note, "Celesté Martinez's charisma, which is undeniable, comes from being real and vulnerable yet strong in her convictions." In 2025 Soy Celesté also provided leadership for Denver's Girls Rock Denver, an organization dedicated to supporting girls and gender expansive youth through music and performance.

Soy Celesté's Feminista Manifestó album received a Best of Denver 2025 Award for Best Bilingual Badass Feminist Punk Album, with Westword describing the album as "a searing, fifteen-track magnum opus about feminism, politics and identity, translated through an amalgamation of Latin folk, cumbria and punk rock." Their performance was deemed a "standout performance" at the 2024 Underground Music Showcase. Also in 2024, the band was named as one of the "Best Punk Bands from Denver You Need to See Live. After the 2024 U.S. Presidential election, music critic Emily Ferguson wrote, "We recommend diving into Soy Celesté's Feminista Manifestó to throw a metaphorical middle finger at the president-elect." In 2025, Soy Celesté was featured on Manuel Aragon's Latine Futures Month, a celebration spotlighting leaders in the Chicanx, Latinx, Guatemalan, Venezuelan, and Mexican communities.

== Style and lyrical themes ==
Soy Celesté brings together Latin folk and punk rock with a Riot Grrrl aesthetic, employing both English and Spanish in their lyrics. Songwriter Martinez embraces a songwriting tradition that follows the Mexican genre of son jarocho, combining Spanish and African elements. Among the band's influences are Alice Bag, Mercedes Sosa, Lido Pimienta, La Dame Blanche, and Selena.

Soy Celesté performances include covers, such as of X-Ray Spex's Identity, and songs referencing traditional Mexican folk songs such as La Llorona and La Bruha. Influences of Chicano rock, cumbia, and punk rock are heard on the band's song, Feminism is Intersectional and on the song Machista, which Martinez describes in the documentary Riot Grrrl: Denver's Punk Rebellion as punk "with some Western flair," featuring lyrics that call out those who claim to be feminista but unconsciously perpetuate patriarchal oppression through expressions of internalized sexism or machismo. The song includes Mariachi trumpet and Grito, with the music video for Machista featuring images of Martinez in an embroidered Charro vest, bright blue bolo tie, and wide brimmed fringed sombrero and sterling silver concho-banded black hat with face and body glitter, microphone loaded in a gun holster.

== Band members ==
Celesté Martinez, vocals and guitar

Stevie Gunter, bass

Saladin Thomas, drums

Featuring Yuzo Nieto on saxophone and Joshua Trinidad on trumpet
