= Rodolfo (album) =

Studio album by Fito Páez
- Released: September 12, 2007
- Recorded: 2007 at Circo Beat Studios, Argentina
- Genres: Latin pop, Rock en Español
- Label: Sony BMG
- Producer: Fito Páez

Fito Páez chronology
El Mundo Cabe en Una Canción (2006)	Rodolfo (2007)	No sé si es Baires o Madrid (2008)

Rodolfo is a studio album released by Argentine recording artist Fito Páez. Released by Sony BMG on September 12, 2007, it was recorded at the Circo Beat Studios in Argentina. The album includes two instrumental tracks, the remainder made only with piano and voice. Rodolfo entered the top ten in Argentina and earned Páez a Latin Grammy for Best Singer-Songwriter Album.

== Background and repertoire ==
Rodolfo is the follow-up to the Latin Grammy awarded El Mundo Cabe en Una Canción (2006) which was recorded at the Circo Beat Studios in Argentina. The album was recorded in Páez' house with sole company of his piano, and was meant as an album of love songs. The first track, "Si Es Amor", begins with the lyrics "wisdom comes when is useless", but finishes with optimism, stating "nothing else matters when there is love". "Vas Conmigo" is also a love song, with evocations for his native town Rosario as he did on his previous album. "Sofi Fue una Nena de Papá" and "El Verdadero Amar", are two stories narrated with a tinge of violence and marginalization. "Nocturno en Sol +" and "Waltz for Marguie" are two instrumental tracks. On the song "El cuarto de al lado", Páez defines life. "Siempre te voy a Amar", "Mágica Hermosura" and "Gracias", are remembrances of past relationships and they include references to Luis Alberto Spinetta, Litto Nebbia and Charly García.

== Chart performance ==
Rodolfo entered the Argentine Albums Chart at number eight, being the third best debut of the week of September 21, 2007, following La Lengua Popular by Andrés Calamaro, which peaked at number-one, and Manu Chao's La Radiolina at number seven.

== Track listing ==
This track listing adapted from Allmusic and liner notes.

All tracks are written by Fito Páez.

No.	Title	Length
1.	"Si Es Amor (Yes it's Love)"	4:03
2.	"Sofi Fue una Nena de Papá (Sofi Was Daddy's Girl)"	4:14
3.	"Vas Conmigo (Go with Me)"	2:19
4.	"Nocturno en Sol + (Nocturnal in G Major)"	2:58
5.	"El Cuarto de al Lado (The Room Beside)"	3:30
6.	"Cae la Noche en Okinawa (The Night Comes Down in Okinawa)"	3:46
7.	"Siempre Te Voy a Amar (I Will Always Love You)"	2:21
8.	"Mágica Hermosura (Magical Beauty)"	3:10
9.	"El Verdadero Amar (True Love)"	5:55
10.	"Waltz for Marguie"	2:28
11.	"Gracias (Thank You)"	4:26
12.	"Zamba del Cielo (Heaven Zamba)"	4:23

== Personnel ==
- Fito Páez – main performer, producer, vocals, lyricist, composer
