= Zoe Gotusso =

Argentine musician

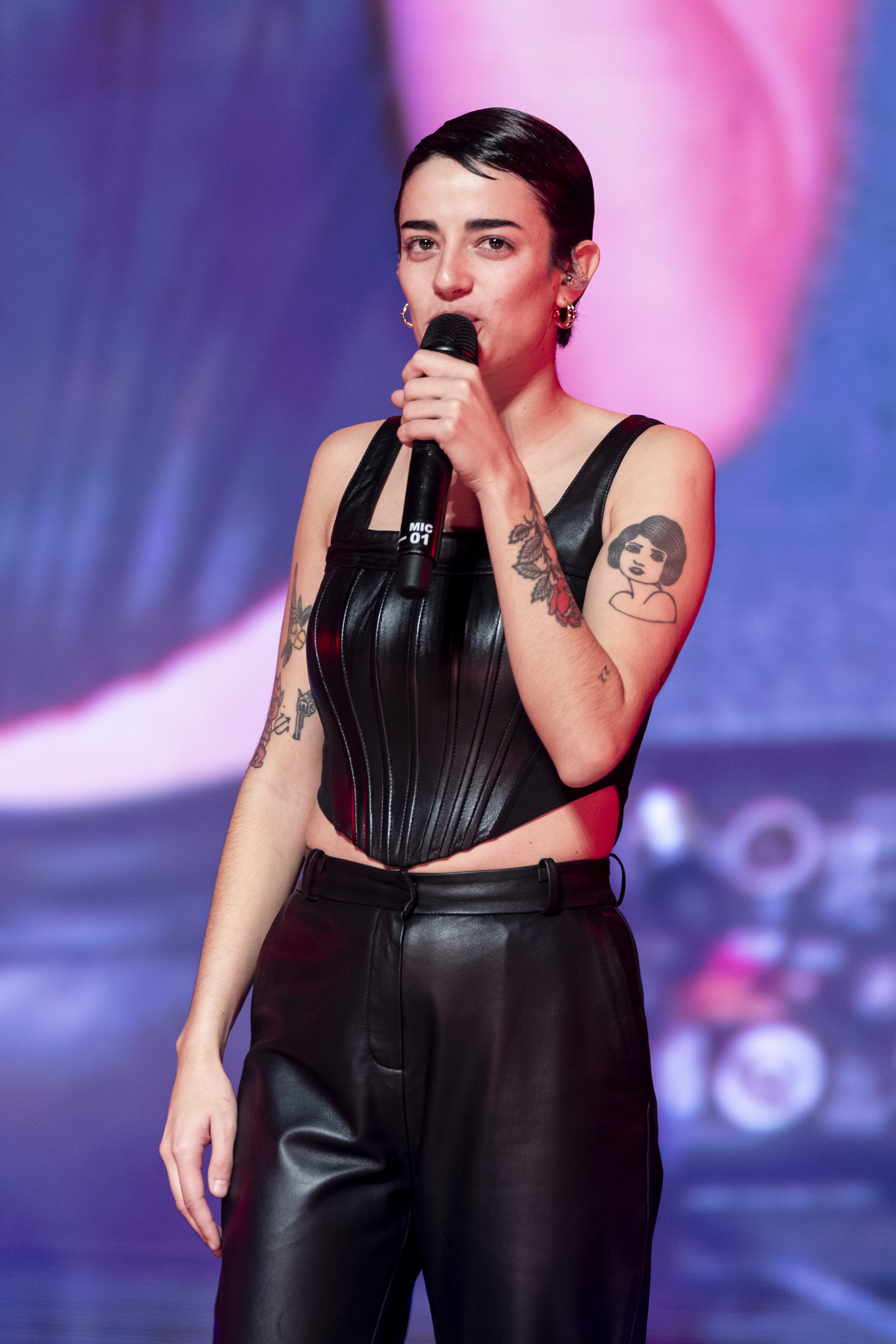
- Gotusso during the closing of MICA 2023

Background information
- Born: May 22, 1997 (age 28)
- Origin: Córdoba, Argentina
- Genres: Indie pop
- Occupation: Musician
- Years active: 2016-present

Zoe Gotusso (born 22 May 1997) is an Argentine singer and songwriter. She gained recognition as one of the members of the duo Salvapantallas and later as a solo artist, releasing her debut solo album Mi Primer Día Triste in 2020.

== Career ==
Gotusso began her career as one of the members of the musical duo Salvapantallas alongside the musician Santi Celli. They formed the project in 2016 in Córdoba, Argentina and released their first album SMS in 2018. The album was recorded at El Mar, a studio in Buenos Aires and featured Jorge Drexler as a guest singer for one of the songs. The duo received two nominations at the 21st Annual Gardel Awards, for Best New Artist and Best Pop Group Album. In August 2019, Gotusso and Celli decided to end the project to pursue solo careers. They performed a series of shows as a final tour named "#HastaluegoSalvapantallas", performing their last show at the Teatro Opera in Buenos Aires on 2 November 2019.

After releasing the songs "Una Bossa +", "Monoambiente en Capital" and "Calefón" during 2019, Gotusso released "Ganas" on 18 June 2020 as the first single from her first album, followed by "Cuarto Creciente" as the album's second single, released on 30 October of the same year. Her debut studio album Mi Primer Día Triste was released on 4 December 2020. The album was recorded in Montevideo with production from Juan Campodónico and the participation of musicians such as Diego Mema, Alejandro Terán, Hugo Fattoruso, Nicolás Ibarburu and the members of Bajofondo, Javier Casalla and Gabriel Casacuberta. The record was accompanied by a documentary film named Retrato en Movimiento, which shows the process of recording and production of the album. At the 23rd Annual Gardel Awards, Gotusso was nominated for Best New Artist, this time as a solo artist and won Best Pop Album.

She has collaborated with fellow artists such as Malena Villa, Julián Kartún, Juan Ingaramo, Louta and the bands No Te Va Gustar and El Zar. She has also released the song "Pensando en ti", originally written and performed by Paulinho Moska.

== Discography ==
=== With Salvapantallas ===
- SMS (2018)

=== As a solo artist ===
- Mi Primer Día Triste (2020)

== Awards and nominations ==
Award	Year	Category	Nominated work	Result	Ref.
Gardel Awards	2019	Best New Artist	SMS (with Salvapantallas)	Nominated	
Gardel Awards	2019	Best Pop Group Album	SMS (with Salvapantallas)	Nominated	
Gardel Awards	2021	Best New Artist	Mi Primer Día Triste	Nominated	
Gardel Awards	2021	Best Pop Album	Mi Primer Día Triste	Won	
Latin Grammy Awards	2021	Best New Artist	Herself	Nominated	
Latin Grammy Awards	2021	Best Pop/Rock Song	"Ganas"	Nominated	
Latin Grammy Awards	2025	Record of the Year	"Lara"	Pending	
Latin Grammy Awards	2025	Best Traditional Pop Album	Cursi	Pending	
