= El amor después del amor =

- Album cover

Studio album by Fito Páez
- Released: June 1, 1992
- Recorded: 1991
- Genres: Rock en español Argentine rock
- Length: 59:29
- Language: Spanish
- Label: Warner Music
- Producer: Fito Páez

Fito Páez chronology
Tercer mundo (1990)	El amor después del amor (1992)	Circo Beat (1994)

Professional ratings
Review scores
Source	Rating
Allmusic	5/5 stars

El amor después del amor (Love After Love), is the eighth studio album by Argentine musician Fito Páez, released in 1992. El Amor Después del Amor marked the pinnacle of his commercial success, also becoming the most sold album in the history of Argentine rock. In 2007, the Argentine edition of Rolling Stone ranked it 13 on its list of "The 100 Greatest Albums of National Rock".

== Track listing ==
All songs credited to Fito Páez; "La Rueda Mágica" co-credited to Charly García.

No.	Title	Lyrics	Music	Length
1.	"El Amor Después Del Amor" ("Love After Love")	Páez	Páez	5:10
2.	"Dos Días En La Vida" ("Two Days in the Life")	Páez	Páez	3:32
3.	"La Verónica" ("The Veronica")	Páez	Páez	5:55
4.	"Tráfico Por Katmandú" ("Traffic in Kathmandu")	Páez	Páez	4:20
5.	"Pétalo de Sal" ("Petal of Salt")	Páez	Páez	2:43
6.	"Sasha, Sissí Y El Círculo De Baba" ("Sasha, Sissi and the Circle of Drool")	Páez	Páez	4:33
7.	"Un Vestido Y Un Amor" ("One Dress and One Love")	Páez	Páez	3:18
8.	"Tumbas De La Gloria" ("Tombs of Glory")	Páez	Páez	4:33
9.	"La Rueda Mágica" ("The Magical Wheel")	Páez	Páez/Charly García	3:54
10.	"Creo" ("I Believe")	Páez	Páez	4:43
11.	"Detrás Del Muro De Los Lamentos" ("Behind the Wailing Wall")	Páez	Páez	4:30
12.	"Balada de Donna Helena" ("Ballad of Donna Helena")	Páez	Páez	6:05
13.	"Brillante Sobre el Mic" ("Shining on the Mic")	Páez	Páez	4:08
14.	"A Rodar mi Vida" ("Let's Roll My Life")	Páez	Páez	4:44

== In popular culture ==
=== Cover versions ===
"A rodar mi vida" was covered by the cast of Disney Channel's Argentine TV series Soy Luna.

=== In other media ===
"El Amor Después Del Amor" was part of the soundtrack of the 1998 Peruvian film No se lo digas a nadie.

== Chart performance ==
Chart (1992)	Peak position
Argentina (CAPIF)	1

== Personnel ==
Performers

- Fito Páez: vocals, piano, guitar and keyboards
- Tweety González: organ and programming
- Ulises Butrón: guitar
- Guillermo Vadalá: bass and guitar in "La Rueda Mágica"
- Daniel Colombes: drums and percussion

Guest musicians

- Mercedes Sosa: vocals on "Detrás Del Muro De Los Lamentos"
- Luis Alberto Spinetta: vocals, arrangements and guitar on "Pétalo De Sal"
- Charly García: vocals on "La Rueda Mágica"
- Andrés Calamaro: vocals on "La Rueda Mágica" and "Brillante Sobre El Mic"
- Fabiana Cantilo: vocals on "Dos Días En La Vida" and "Brillante Sobre El Mic"
- Celeste Carballo: vocals on "Dos Días En La Vida"
- Claudia Puyó: vocals on "El Amor Después Del Amor"
- Fabian Gallardo: vocals on "Dos Días En La Vida"
- Osvaldo Fattoruso percussion
- Daniel Melingo: clarinet on "Sasha, Sissí Y El Círculo De Baba"
- Ariel Rot: lead guitar on "A Rodar Mi Vida"
- Gabriel Carámbula: guitars on "Brillante Sobre El Mic"
- Antonio Carmona vocals on "Tráfico Por Katmandú", cajón y palmas en "Detrás Del Muro De Los Lamentos"
- Chucho Marchand: bass on "Detrás Del Muro De Los Lamentos"
- Chango Farías Gómez: cajon on "Detrás Del Muro De Los Lamentos"
- Lucho Gonzalez guitar and arrangements on "Detrás Del Muro De Los Lamentos"
- Carlos Narea: claps on "Detrás del Muro de los Lamentos"
- Carlos Villavicencio: brass and string arrangement and conduction (Performed by the Gavin Wright Orchestra, London)

== Certifications and sales ==
Region	Certification	Certified units/sales
Argentina (CAPIF)	Diamond	1,100,000
Uruguay (CUD)	3× Platinum	18,000^{^}
^{^} Shipments figures based on certification alone.

== Influence ==
- El amor después del amor (2023), a biopic about Fito Páez.
