= El mundo cabe en una canción =

Studio album by Fito Páez
- Released: September 21, 2006
- Recorded: June – August, 2006 at Circo Beat Studios, Argentina
- Genre: Latin pop, Rock en Español
- Label: Sony BMG
- Producer: Fito Páez

Fito Páez chronology
Moda y Pueblo (2005)	El mundo cabe en una canción (2006)	Rodolfo (2007)

El mundo cabe en una canción (The World Fits in a Song) is a studio album released by Argentine recording artist Fito Páez. Released by Sony BMG on September 21, 2006, it was recorded at the Circo Beat Studios in Argentina. The album track list was ordered by Páez on a specific sequence telling a "story". To promote the album, Páez released "Eso Que Llevas Ahí" as the lead single. El Mundo earned Páez a Latin Grammy for Best Rock Solo Vocal Album, and was certified gold by the Argentine Chamber of Phonograms and Videograms Producers.

== Background ==
Following the recording and release of the live album Moda y Pueblo in 2005, a collaborative album with Gerardo Gandini, Fito Páez recorded El Mundo Cabe en Una Canción at his Circo Beat Studios in Argentina from June to September 2006, while his second film as director, ¿De Quién es el Portaligas? (Whose is the Garter Belt?), was being edited. El Mundo is the first studio album recorded by Páez since the Latin Grammy Award nominated album Naturaleza Sangre (2005). About the album, Paéz said: "it was born as a music, I listened and then I placed the lyrics... it is a political issue, in the deepest sense of the word."

== Repertoire ==
Páez thought the content of the album in Córdoba, Spain in 2005, on a trip with his musicians and friends, Coki Debernardi and Vandera. The songs included on El Mundo are ordered in a specific sequence telling a "story", with all tracks written by Páez, with additional music by Debernardi on the song "Fué Por Amor". "La Hora del Destino" tells the story of a man who goes out to steal and his partner betrays him. "La Casa en las Estrellas" ended in a four-stroke format with drum and bass and a rhythm and blues beat. "Eso Que Llevas Ahí", the lead single from the album, had several takes before the final one, becoming the only track on the album to be recorded live, with Vadalá playing bass and Pete Thomas on drums. The last song is a tribute to Páez' native town, Rosario.

== Track listing ==
This track listing adapted from Allmusic and liner notes.

All tracks are written by Fito Páez (except where noted)

No.	Title	Length
1.	"El Mundo Cabe en Una Canción [The World Fits in a Song]"	3:21
2.	"Rollinga o Miranda Girl"	3:02
3.	"Te Aliviará [It Will Relief You]"	4:43
4.	"Sargent Maravilla"	3:50
5.	"Entrance"	2:50
6.	"Fue Por Amor [It Was Because of Love] (written by Coki Debernardi and Páez)"	4:19
7.	"Eso Que Llevas Ahí [That Thing You Take There]"	3:43
8.	"Intermezzo"	1:28
9.	"La Hora del Destino [The Hour of Destiny]"	2:54
10.	"Enloquecer [To Go Crazy]"	4:24
11.	"La Casa en las Estrellas [The Stars House]"	4:46
12.	"Caminando por Rosario [Walking Around Rosario]"	3:57

== Personnel ==
- Fito Páez – main performer, producer, vocals, lyricist, composer
