= Bárbara Recanati =

Argentine musician

Barbi Recanati
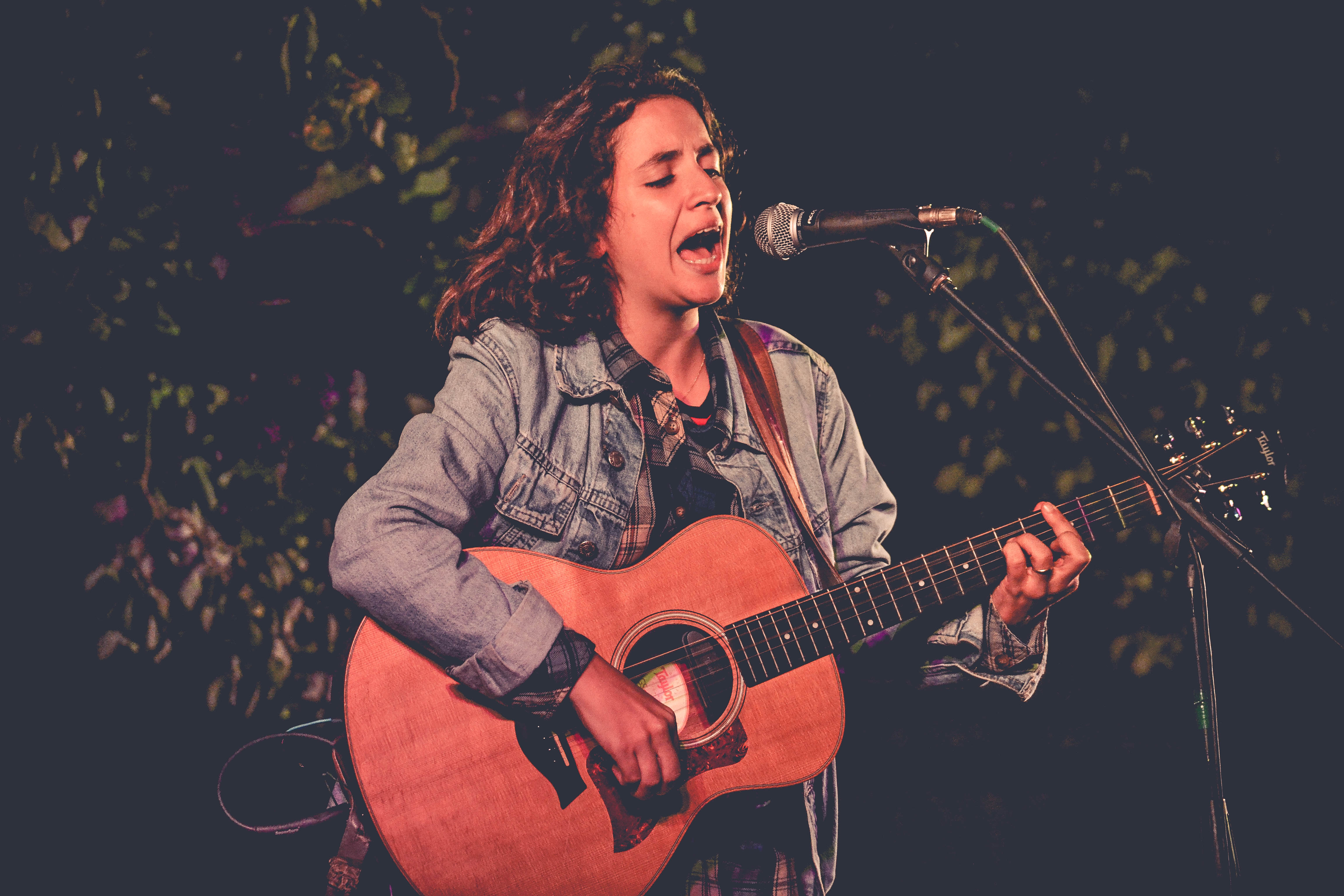
- Recanati performing live in 2019.

Background information
- Born: Bárbara Recanati; November 27, 1986 (age 39)
- Origin: Argentina
- Occupations: Musician, songwriter
- Years active: 2005–present

Bárbara Recanati (born November 27, 1986), better known as Barbi Recanati is an Argentine performing musician and songwriter. She gained recognition as the lead singer and guitarist of the band Utopians from 2005 to 2017 and later as a solo artist.

== Career ==
Recanati began her career as the lead singer and guitarist of the band Utopians alongside Larry Fus (drums), Mario Romero (bass) and Gustavo Fiocchi (guitar). She met Fus when they were attending the same school and formed the band later in 2005. After releasing the EPs Factory and Factory II, the band released their debut studio album Inhuman in 2007. The band would go on to release four more studio albums, Freak (2010), Trastornados (2012), Vándalo (2014) and Todos Nuestros Átomos (2016), the latter received a nomination for Best Rock Album at the 18th Annual Latin Grammy Awards. In 2017, the band officially disbanded after the allegations of sexual abuse made by two women against Gustavo Fiocchi, the guitarist of the band.

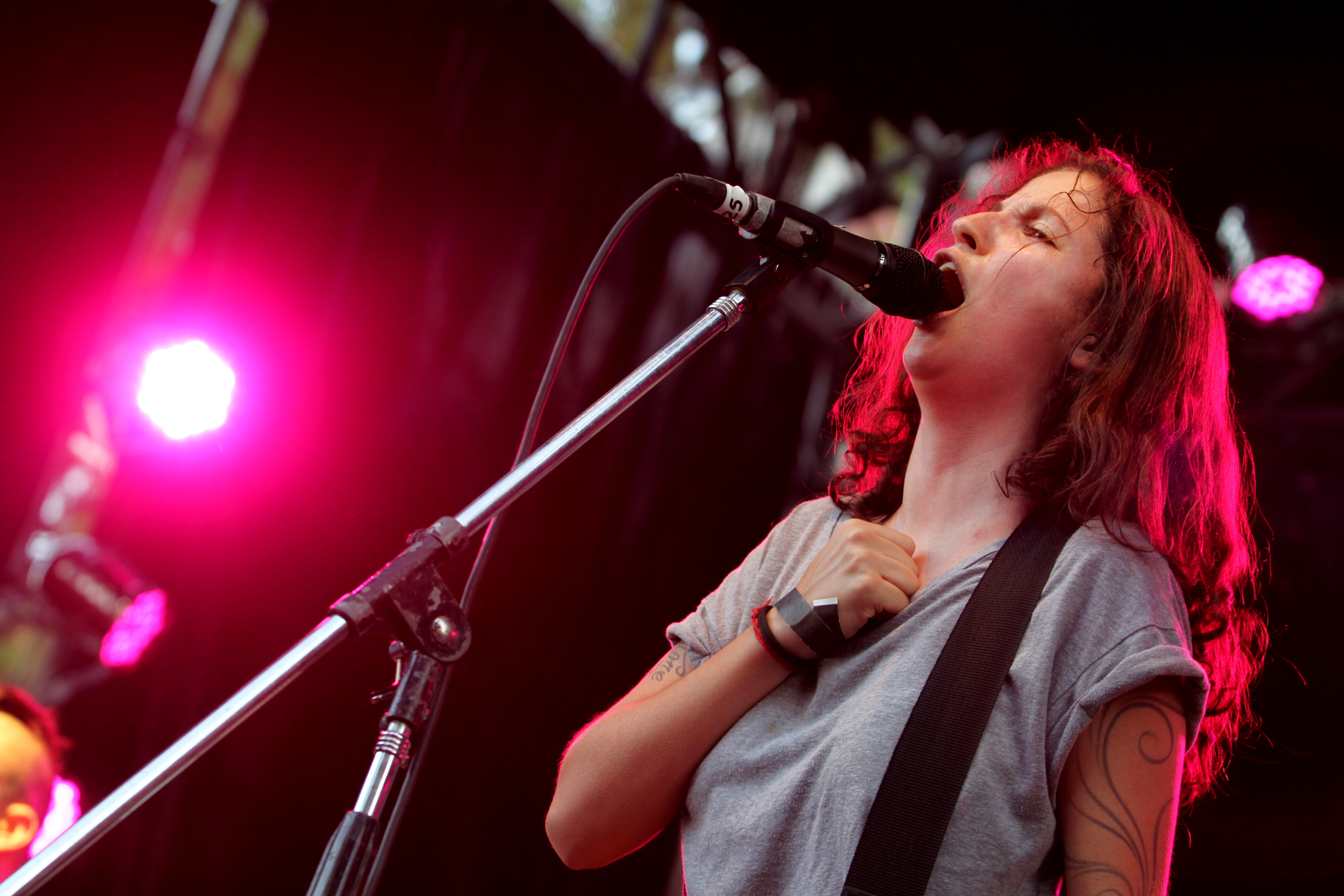
Recanati performing with Utopians.

After performing her last show with Utopians at the Personal Fest on November 12, 2017, Recanati made her debut performing as a solo artist as a guest in a show from the band Eruca Sativa. In August 2018, she released the EP Teoría Espacial, the project was produced by Juan Manuel Segovia and Tomás Molina Lera at Estudio Átomo and was mastered by Hernán Agrasar at Estudio Revolver. Also in 2018, Recanati founded the record label Goza Records in association with the virtual radio station Futurock. Since then, the label has released a project monthly with an emphasis on upcoming and independent female artists and minorities.

In 2019, Recanati performed at Lollapalooza Argentina and Festival Ahora. The same year, she received a nomination for Best New Artis at the 21st Annual Gardel Awards. On March 20, 2020, she released her first studio album titled Ubicación en Tiempo Real. The record was produced by Juan Manuel Segovia and Tomás Molina Lera and was recorded through 2019 and 2020. At the 21st Annual Latin Grammy Awards, she received a nomination for Best Alternative Music Album, while at the 23rd Annual Gardel Awards she won Best Alternative Rock Album.

== Discography ==
=== With Utopians ===
- Inhuman (2007)
- Freak (2010)
- Trastornados (2012)
- Vándalo (2014)
- Todos Nuestros Átomos (2016)

=== As a solo artist ===
- Teoría Espacial (EP, 2018)
- Ubicación en Tiempo Real (LP, 2020)

== Awards and nominations ==
=== Gardel Awards ===
Year	Category	Nominated work	Result	Ref.
2019	Best New Artist	Teoría Espacial	Nominated	
2021	Song of the Year	"Que No"	Nominated	
2021	Best Alternative Rock Album	Ubicación en Tiempo Real	Won	

=== Latin Grammy Awards ===
Year	Category	Nominated work	Result	Ref.
2020	Best Alternative Music Album	Ubicación en Tiempo Real	Nominated	
