= Los años salvajes =

Studio album by Fito Paez
- Released: November 24, 2021
- Studio: Igloo Music (Burbank, California); EastWest Studios (Hollywood, California); El Mostro de la Laguna (Lobos, Buenos Aires)
- Genre: Latin rock; Pop rock
- Length: 40:14
- Language: Spanish
- Label: Sony Music Argentina
- Producer: Fito Páez; Diego Olivero; Gustavo Borner

Fito Paez chronology
La Conquista del Espacio (2020)	Los años salvajes (2021)	Futurología Arlt (2022)

Singles from Los Años Salvajes
- 1. "Vamos a Lograrlo" Released: October 17, 2021

Los años salvajes (English: The Wild Years) is the twenty-fifth studio album by Argentine singer and songwriter Fito Páez, released on November 24, 2021, through Sony Music Argentina. The album was produced by Páez himself alongside Diego Olivero and Gustavo Borner. English singer and songwriter Elvis Costello and Argentine singer Fabiana Cantilo appear as featured artists.

At the 23rd Annual Latin Grammy Awards, the album won Best Pop/Rock Album, being Páez second win in the category after La Conquista del Espacio in 2020. Additionally, the track "Lo Mejor de Nuestras Vidas" won Best Rock Song. The album was also nominated for Best Latin Rock or Alternative Album at the 65th Annual Grammy Awards, being his third Grammy Award nomination. In Argentina, the album was nominated for Best Rock Solo Album at the Gardel Awards in 2020. The following year, the title track was nominated for the Gardel Award for Best Music Video.

== Background ==
Los Años Salvajes is the first part of a trilogy of albums released between 2021 and 2022. The album was followed by Futurología Arlt (2022), an instrumental album recorded alongside the Czech National Symphony Orchestra, and then by The Golden Light (2022), an album composed of a series of songs accompanied by only a piano. Recording for Los Años Salvajes took place in both the United States and Argentina, at three different studios: Igloo Music in Burbank, California, EastWest Studios in Hollywood, California and El Mostro de la Laguna in Lobos, Buenos Aires.

The cover for the album features a young long-haired Páez wearing the type of glasses he would wear during the late seventies and early eightees.

== Composition ==
Consisting of ten songs, all the songs were written by Páez (with the exception of "Beer Blues", which was co-written by Elvis Costello) and produced by Páez alongside Diego Olivero and Gustavo Borner. The album was composed during the COVID-19 pandemic. Namely, the pandemic is discussed in "Caballo de Troya" with lines like "si algo aprendimos de este encierro de locos es que la peste la inventamos еntre todos con el tiempo" ("if we learned anything from this crazy confinement, is that the plague is invented by all of us over time").

The album deals with themes of time and Páez own life experiences. According to Páez, the album title ("The Wild Years" in English) "makes no nostalgic allusions to wild years gone by, more than anything, it focuses on the present". Páez life values are dealt in the album opener "Vamos a Lograrlo". About the song, Páez said: "it focuses on the things that I consider important, which are always smaller and not so fatuous". His relationship with the actress Eugenia Kolodziej is discussed in "Sin Mi en Vos", while his ex-girlfriend and friend Fabiana Cantilo is mentioned in "Encuentros Cercanos". Cantilo also appears as a featured artist in the last song of the album "Los Años Salvajes", where Páez marked a review of his life. Aside from Cantilo, Elvis Costello is the second featured artist in the album. He appears in "Beer Blues", which according to Páez is "the story of two friends who meet in a bar in London and then travel to Rosario, they sit down to have drinks and write about their personal stories and common points of view", and was created through meeting via Zoom.

== Promotion ==
The album was supported by the single "Vamos a Lograrlo", released on October 17, 2021. The same week of the release, a lyric video for the song was uploaded to Páez's YouTube channel. Music videos for the tracks "Lo Mejor de Nuestras Vidas" and "Los Años Salvajes" were also uploaded to YouTube. The music video for the latter was directed by Eduardo Braun and Justo Dell Acqua, and was nominated for a Gardel Award.

To promote the album, Páez performed several concerts through Argentina, including concerts at Movistar Arena and Polideportivo Mar del Plata, as well as appearances as the music festivals Cosquín Rock 2022 and Quilmes Rock 2022. He also performed at Asunciónico in Paraguay, and at both the WiZink Center and Auditori del Fòrum in Spain.

== Track listing ==
All tracks were written by Fito Páez and produced by Páez, Diego Olivero and Gustavo Borner, except where noted.

Los Años Salvajes track listing
No.	Title	Writer(s)	Length
1.	"Vamos a Lograrlo [Let's make It]"		3:59
2.	"Lo Mejor de Nuestras Vidas [The best of our lives]"		4:06
3.	"Shut Up"		4:01
4.	"La Música de los Sueños de Tu Juventud [The music of the dream of your youth]"		4:13
5.	"Caballo de Troya [Troy horse]"		3:01
6.	"Sin Mi en Vos [Without me in you]"		3:09
7.	"Lili and Drake"		3:40
8.	"Encuentros Cercanos [Close encounters]"		4:26
9.	"Beer Blues" (featuring Elvis Costello)	Fito Páez; Elvis Costello	3:18
10.	"Los Años Salvajes [The wild years]" (featuring Fabiana Cantilo)		6:15
Total length:			40:14

== Credits ==
- Fito Páez – vocals, production, songwriting, piano, clarinet, moog synthesizer, acoustic guitar
- Fabiana Cantilo – featured artist
- Elvis Costello – featured artist, songwriting
- Diego Olivero – production, record engineering, synthesizers, organ, electric guitar, backing vocals
- Gustavo Borner – production, record engineering, mixing
- Phil Levine – record engineering
- Justin Moshkevich – mastering
- Anna Muehlichen – assistant engineering
- Noah Hubbell – assistant engineering
- Leonardo Bertinelli – assistant engineering
- Simon Guevara – assistant engineering
- Maximo Abraham – assistant engineering
- Logan Taylor – assistant engineering
- Alejandro Avalis – recording assistant
- April Harff – production manager
- Guillermo Vadala – bass
- Juani Aguero – guitars
- Abraham Laboriel Jr. – drums
- Michael Landau – guitar
- Juan Absatz – backing vocals
- Carlos Vandera – backing vocals
- Luis Conte – drums
