= La Dame Blanche =

Cuban musician (born 1974)

- Born: Yaité Ramos Rodriguez; 31 August 1974 (age 51); Pinar del Río, Cuba
- Genres: Alternative hip hop; Latin pop; urban contemporary; R&B; world music
- Occupations: Musician; singer; rapper
- Instruments: Flute; vocals; Percussion
- Years active: 1994–present
- Label: Nacional Records
- Website: ladameblanche.net

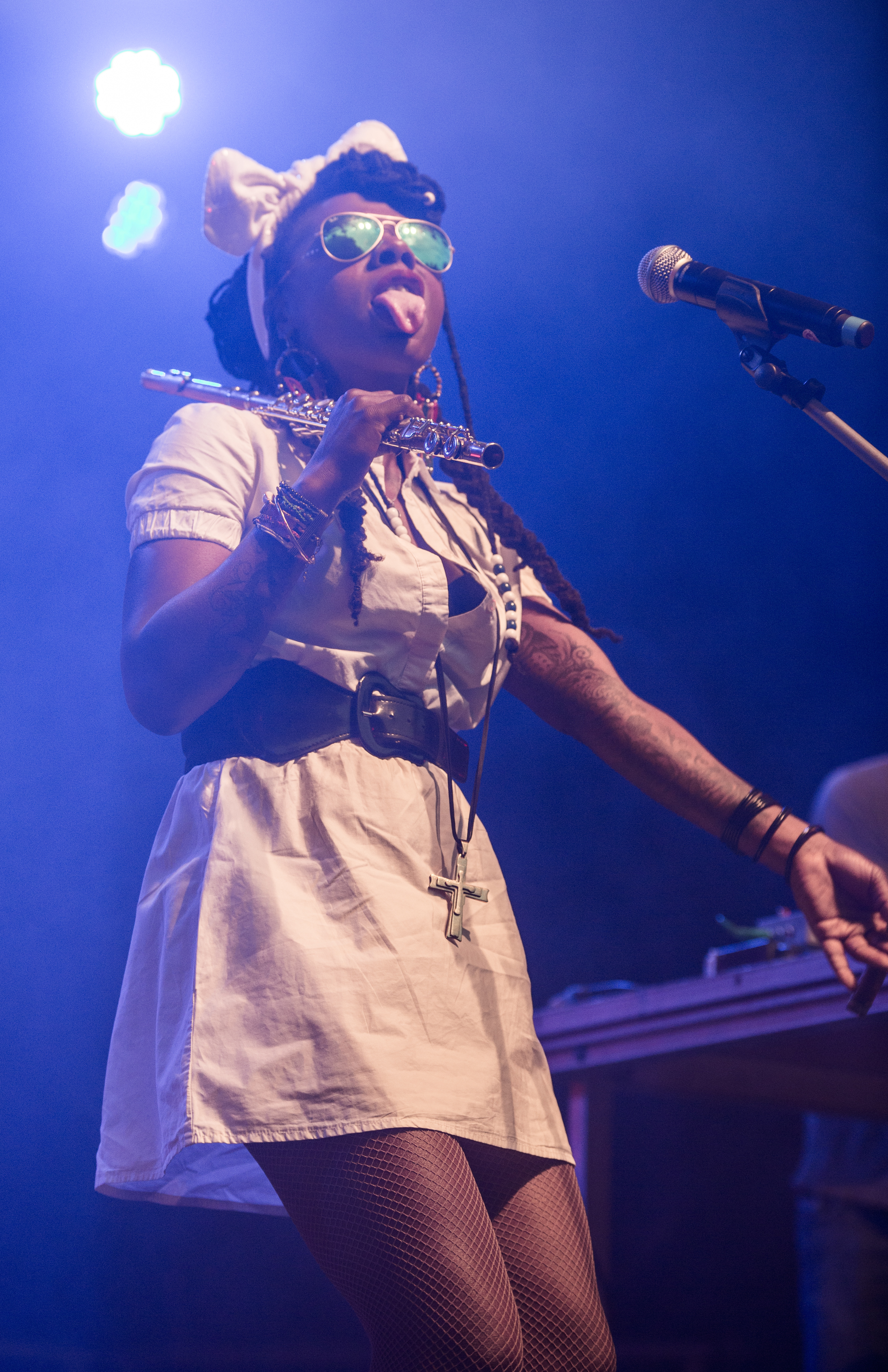
La Dame Blance at Rudolstadt-Festival, 2017.

Yaité Ramos Rodriguez (born 31 August 1974), also known by her stage name La Dame Blanche, is a Cuban singer, flutist and percussionist. She has a classical training in transverse flute in the National Art School in Havana. but her music combines hip-hop, cumbia, reggae, electro and Afro-Cuban tradition. She has been based in Paris since 1998

== Biography ==
Yaité Ramos Rodriguez was born on 31 August 1974 in Pinar del Río, Cuba. Yaite is the daughter of Iris Rodriguez and Jesus "Aguaje" Ramos, a trombonist and artistic director of the Orquesta Buena Vista Social Club. Yaite is also the niece of Mayito Rivera, ex singer of Los Van Van. Yaite moved to Havana and studied transverse flute in the National Art School (Escuela Nacional de Arte). She graduated in 1994 and joined the female septet Sabor a Miel, where she sang traditional, folk, rumba, boleros and Afro-Cuban music to earn a living. In 1998 Yaite moved to Paris, France, where she sang in the all-girl salsa band Rumbana, joined the Grand Orchestre du Splendid, became back-up singer for Sergent Garcia and live singer for El Hijo de la Cumbia. All those experiences added to her emancipation from the family heritage and helped her develop her own musical language.

=== La Dame Blanche ===
In 2014 Yaite Ramos Rodriguez becomes La Dame Blanche and releases "Piratas" her first LP published by Wakan Tanka Record and produced by Emiliano Gómez and Marc "Babylotion" Damblé. In several interviews she explains that her father was not very pleased with her musical identity telling her that she did not know what else to make herself. La Dame Blanche presented her first LP in prestigious venues such as "Les Suds" festival in Arles, France.

In 2016, La Dame Blanche released her second album "2", also produced by Marc Damblé and Emiliano Gómez and published by Wakan Tanka Records. The album has 17 songs that balance an influence of Latin rhythms with elements of hip-hop, dub, reggae, world music and electronica. The lyrics are focused on social issues and stories from her own neighborhood that are combined with flows that pass through various parts of the world. Some of the artists that collaborate in this album are: Philippe Cohen-Solal (Gotan Project), Toy Selectah (Control Machette), DJ Nakeye, Flaco Nuñez (Orishas) and her daughter Rachel.

La Dame Blanche was invited to perform at the South by Southwest (SXSW) Music Festival in Austin, Texas, the WOMEX Festival in Poland, the WOMAD Charlton Park Festival and GlobalFest in New York City. She soon began her first American tour. On stage, La Dame Blanche gives homage to her upbringing in the tobacco-rich region with a cigar in hand, a glass of rum, necklaces, white flowers and turban, feeding the energy of the spirits of Santeria, her Afro-Cuban religion. Her stage name refers to a fearsome yet benevolent mythical figure: witch, sorcerer and healer.

In May 2018, La Dame Blanche released "Bajo el mismo cielo" (Under the same sky) by National Records. According to the artist, this album is a declaration of her identity as a musician and black Cuban woman, resulting in a genre that she describes as hip-hop-urbano-Cubano. In this album, La Dame Blanche worked with numerous musicians including Manteiga, a singer from the South African group Batuk on "Mentira"; Mexican duo Celso Piña and Serko Fu on "Dos Caras; Nelson Palacios, singer and Cuban multi-instrumentalist on "No Puedo Loco"; and Brazilian rapper Rincon Sapiência on "El Sumo Sacerdote". The sixth track, "Bajo El Mismo Cielo", features the Spanish singer and flamenco guitarist Sergio Aguilera.

In September 2020, La Dame Blanche released "ELLA", published by Nacional Records. This fourth album by La Dame Blanche is a tribute to her mother, and all of the women that inhabit her. "ELLA" was recorded between Paris (Substudioz) and Mexico City (T-Vox Records). It was produced by Marc "Babylotion'' Damblé and includes beats by French artist Baja Frequencia (La Mulata) and Costarican artist Barzo (La Desconfiada). "ELLA" is a concept album whose ten tracks tell the stories of ten different women. For instance, in La Creyente, which was written during the news about the Amazon fires, Yaite shows her more spiritual side. La Maltratada is a cry for all of the women suffering abuse in the world. The cover art of the album was created by Romanian artist Livia Fălcaru.

In 2021 La Dame Blanche released a series of singles which included: VENENO, inspired by pandemic lockdown and performed at a COLORS SHOW session; MATA SEDE, a downtempo track recorded in collaboration with Brazilian actress Amanda Magalhaes and LA TRAMPA, written together with Mexican artist Pahua.

During 2022 and 2023, La Dame Blanche toured United States, performed at the Vive Latino Festival in Mexico City and also in France, Switzerland, Italy, Denmark, Spain, Belgium and the United Kingdom. She recorded and collaborated with Sol Pereyra and Juli Lasso from Argentina, Villano Antillano, trans rapper from Puerto Rico, La Perla and Dawer X Damper from Colombia, Novalima from Peru, Chico Trujillo from Chile and Nakury from Costa Rica.

In December 2023, La Dame Blanche released her fifth album "Atómica" produced by Marc "Babylotion" Damblé and published by Nacional Records. The album debuted with the single "Mi Negro", inspired by multiple-Latin GRAMMY nominated rapper Akapellah's "Mi Negra" – an ode to black women, their strength and their beauty. La Dame Blanche responds with words of gratitude, mutual respect and admiration.

== Discography ==
=== Studio albums ===
- Piratas (2014)
- 2 (2016)
- Bajo el mismo cielo (2018)
- ELLA (2020)
- Atómica (2023)

=== Singles ===
- "Cógelo con Calma" (2020)
- "La Mentalista" (2020)
- "La Maltratada" (2020)
- "Mata Sede" feat. Amanda Magalhaes (2021)
- "Veneno" (2021)
- "Qué más quieres que te dé" (2021)
- "A la Verita Tuya (Shangó Remix)" (2022)
- "Wine" feat. Nakury (2022)
- "Mala Mía" feat. Sol Pereyra (2023)
- "Oídos Sordos" (2023)
- "Como Loba" (2023)
- "Los fines de semana" (2023)
- "Bailarina" – Mula (2023)

=== Collaborations ===
- "La Trampa" – Pahua (2021)
- "Muy Loca" – Bassajam (2023)
- "No azara" – Dawer x Damper (2023)
- "Olvidarte Nunca" – Julieta Laso (2023)
- "El remanso" – Tercos (2023)
- "Que se cuide ese muchacho" – Renee Goust y Khylie Rylo (2024)
- "María" – Niña Dioz (2024)
