= Louta (musician) =

Argentine musician (born 1994)

LOUTA
- Born: Jaime Martín James; June 22, 1994 (age 31)
- Origin: Buenos Aires, Argentina
- Occupations: Performing musician, songwriter, producer, DJ, actor
- Years active: 2016–present

Jaime Martín James (born June 22, 1994), better known as Louta (stylized as LOUTA), is an Argentine performing musician, producer, songwriter, disc-jockey and actor. He has released three studio albums and received a Gardel Award nomination and a Latin Grammy Award nomination.

He played the role of “Gaston” in Society of the Snow, a 2024 Spanish film, and Spain's entry to the Academy Awards for best international feature film.

== Career ==
James was born on June 22, 1994, his mother, Ana Frenkel, is a dancer and his father, Diqui James, is the founder of the theatre companies De la Guarda and Fuerza Bruta. After finishing high school, James went on a trip to Europe after feeling "particularly hopeless with everything", coming back to Argentina with the decision to "release an album in 2016". According to him, the name "Louta" does not have any meaning, instead it follows the format of the name of a brand, with a short but recognizable word as a name.

In 2016, he released his debut studio album, the self titled LOUTA, the project led him to perform at Lollapalooza Argentina in 2017 and to support the Canadian instrumental music group BadBadNotGood in one of their performances at the Niceto Club in Buenos Aires. On October 12, 2018, he released his second album, ENCHASTRE through Sony Music, it was produced by James himself alongside Nico Cotton, Timoteo Padilla, Roque Ferrari and Tomás Susevich, mastered by Mike Bozzi and featured Argentine singers Marilina Bertoldi and Zoe Gotusso as guest singers.

During 2019, he released the songs "Tau Tau" and "No Te Comas la Peli", the music video for the latter, directed by James and Lucía Lalor, received a nomination for Best Music Video at the Gardel Awards of 2020. Also in 2019, he collaborated with the Bizarrap in "Louta: Bzrp Music Sessions, Vol. 20". On May 28, 2020, he released his third album 2030, the project was recorded during the quarantines due to the COVID-19 pandemic and was produced alongside Eduardo Cabra from Calle 13 with also the participation Alizzz, Nico Cotton, Orodembow and Mauro De Tommaso in the production. The album received a nomination for Best Alternative Music Album at the 21st Annual Latin Grammy Awards. In 2023, he and Sabrina Carpenter opened for Taylor Swift during The Eras Tour in Buenos Aires.

== Discography ==
- LOUTA (2016)
- ENCHASTRE (2018)
- 2030 (2020)
- UN INSTANTE (2025)

== Filmography ==
Year	Title	Role	Notes	Ref.
2023	Society of the Snow	Gastón Costemalle		

== Awards and nominations ==
=== Gardel Awards ===
Year	Category	Nominated work	Result	Ref.
2019	Best Alternative Pop Album	Enchastre	Won	
2020	Best Music Video	"No Te Comas la Peli"	Nominated	
2023	Best Urban Music Song	"Quereme" (with Wos)	Nominated	
2023	Best Urban Music Collaboration	"Quereme" (with Wos)	Nominated	

=== Latin Grammy Awards ===
Year	Category	Nominated work	Result	Ref.
2020	Best Alternative Music Album	2030	Nominated	
