= Operación Triunfo (Argentine TV series) =

Operación Triunfo is the Argentine version of the series Operación Triunfo based on the international series Star Academy.

Until 2009, 4 editions were held. It was hosted by Marley.

The program had a comeback in 2012–2013 with a new 5th season and a change in format, by the Argentine television station Telefe. The new edition, hosted by Germán Paoloski, is just for female contestants, with the aim of forming a girl group.

== Editions ==
Edition	Year	Winner	Runner-up	Other contestants (in order of elimination)	No. of contestants
1	2003	Claudio Basso	Pablo Tamagnini	Ricardo Bugna, Victoria Niven, David Marín, Rosana Brito, Natalia Ramos, Carolina Cimalando, María Esther, Juan Pacifico, Martín Sus, María Zeta, Luciano Pabon, Fernando Bergagno, Guadalupe Álvarez Luchia, Juliana Ruiz, Andrea Bela, Emanuel Arias	18
2	2004-2005	José Garcia	César Palavecino	Laura Alba, Pablo Pizarro, Agustina Leoni, Agustina Maltese, Georgina Zaglul, Mariana Vallejos, Melisa Carazza, Bruno Ragone, Diego Frachia, Diego Lauría, Josefina Achaval, Natalia Daza, Gastón Madariaga, Evelyn Sanzo, Priscilla Omil, Franco Martínez, Lucas Boschiero, Nelson Giménez, Florencia Villagra, Federico Maldonado	22
3	2005-2006	Benjamín Rosales	Romina Maroso	Bárbara Perrone, Andrés González, Ezequiel Díaz, María Eugenia de Rosa, Janet Tiraboschi, Luciano Almagro, Matías Meza, Analía Trías, Alina Marín, Damián Samudio, Matías Aranda, Adrián Ocampo, Mariela Josid, Fabiana Díaz, Florencia Lazarte, Juan Ignacio Agostini, Emilio Dufour, Mercedes Calviello, Ariel Coronel, Luba Tymchuk	22
4	2009	Cristian Soloa	Gabriel Morales	Maite Moreira, Ayelén Varela, Agustín Pistone, Carolina Minella, Pablo D'Amico, Eliazim Gutiérrez, Vanessa Miranda, Soledad Scalerandi, Martín Abascal, Sebastián Martingaste, María del Huerto Bulacio, Juliana Castro Barello, Juan Ignacio Silva, Ayelén Kelly Bueno, Nadia Robledo, Johana Quinteros, Agustín Argüello	19
5	2012-2013	Carla Dorto	TBA	Florencia Coletto, Martina Barrios, Florencia Arce, Melené Desia, Stefanía Roitman (quit), Mariela Peralta, Milagros Ábate, Ana Carla Ramirez, Julia Dispagna, Justina Ceballos, Analía Szymczak, Daiana Liparoti, Katrina Teves, Regina Picone, Sofía Buczko, Silvina Zanollo, Lula Rosenthal, Macarena Pérez, Yanina Deangeli	20

== Season 1 (2003) ==
=== Contestants ===
18 contestants were presented in Gala 1.

Contestant	Age	Residence	Episode of elimination	Place
Claudio Basso	25	Cipolletti, Rio Negro	Gala Final	1st
Pablo Tamagnini	19	Rio Cuarto, Córdoba	Gala Final	2nd
Emanuel Arias	22	Santa Rosa, La Pampa	Gala Final	3rd
Andrea Bela	24	San Juan, San Juan	Gala Final	4th
Juliana Ruiz	28	Buenos Aires	Gala Final	5th
Guadalupe Álvarez Luchia	18	Olivos, Buenos Aires	Gala Final	6th
Fernando Bergagno	19	Barranqueras, Chaco	Gala 14	7th
Luciano Pavón	18	Mar del Plata, Buenos Aires	Gala 13	8th
María Zeballos	23	Buenos Aires	Gala 12	9th
Martín Sus	18	Buenos Aires	Gala 11	10th
Juan Pacífico	29	San Miguel de Tucumán, Tucumán	Gala 10	11th
María Esther Rosa	21	Montevideo, Uruguay	Gala 9	12th
Carolina Cimalando	20	Verónica, Buenos Aires	Gala 8	13th
Natalia Ramos	26	Salta, Salta	Gala 7	14th
Rosana Laudani	24	Córdoba, Córdoba	Gala 6	15th
David Marín	21	Rosario, Santa Fe	Gala 5	16th
Victoria Niven	21	Mendoza, Mendoza	Gala 4	17th
Ricardo Bugna	24	Buenos Aires	Gala 3	18th
