= Buenos Aires 8 =

- Origin: Argentina
- Genres: Tango
- Years active: 1973–2003
- Past members: Chichita Fanelli; Magdalena León; Ani Grunwald; Laura Hatton; Analía Lovato; Clara Steinberg; Miguel Odiard; Guli Tolaba; Horacio Corral; Fernando Llosa

Buenos Aires 8 was an Argentine vocal ensemble which specialised in recording tango classics such as music by Ástor Piazzolla.

== Personnel ==
- Chichita Fanelli
- Magdalena León (Ani Grunwald, in an earlier formation)
- Laura Hatton (Analía Lovato, in an earlier formation)
- Clara Steinberg
- Miguel Odiard
- Guli Tolaba
- Horacio Corral
- Fernando Llosa

== Discography ==
=== Studio albums ===
- Tangos (1973)
- Timeless (1990)
- Folklore (unknown)
