= Tercer mundo =

Tercer Mundo

Studio album by Fito Páez
- Released: 1990
- Genre: Rock en español Argentine rock
- Length: 42:09
- Language: Spanish
- Label: Warner Music
- Producer: Fito Páez

Fito Páez chronology
Grandes éxitos (1990)	Tercer Mundo (1990)	Crónica (1991)

Singles from Tercer Mundo
- 1. "El Chico de la Tapa" Released: 1990; 2. "Tercer Mundo" Released: 1990; 3. "Los Buenos Tiempos" Released: 1990; 4. "Y Dale Alegría a Mi Corazón" Released: 1991; 5. "Carabelas Nada" Released: 1991

Professional ratings
Review scores
Source	Rating
Allmusic	4/5 stars

Tercer Mundo (Third World), is the sixth album by Argentine musician Fito Páez, released in 1990.

== Track listing ==
All tracks are written by Fito Páez

No.	Title	Length
1.	"El Chico de la Tapa [The guy of the cover]"	2:48
2.	"B. Ode y Evelyn"	3:57
3.	"Tercer Mundo [Third world]"	4:46
4.	"Religion Song"	4:55
5.	"Fue Amor [It was love]"	4:15
6.	"Yo Te Amé en Nicaragua [I loved you in Nicaragua]"	5:01
7.	"Hazte Fama [Become famous]"	3:28
8.	"Carabelas Nada [Caravels nothing]"	4:33
9.	"Los Buenos Tiempos [The good times]"	3:06
10.	"Y Dale Alegría a Mi Corazón [And give joy to my heart]"	5:14

== Personnel ==
Performers

- Fito Páez - vocals, electronic keyboard, guitars y percussion
- Ricardo Verdirame - guitar, vocals, electronic keyboard
- Guillermo Vadala - bass, guitars and double bass
- Daniel Colombres - drums

Guest musicians

- Fabiana Cantilo - principal vocalist on "B-Ode y Evelyn", backing vocals on "Religion song", "Yo te amé en Nicaragua" and "Y dale alegría a mi corazón"
- Marcela Chediack - percussion on "Y dale alegría a mi corazón"
- Charly García - piano on "B-Ode y Evelyn"
- David Lebón - vocals on "Y dale alegría a mi corazón", guitar on "Los buenos tiempos"
- Celeste Carballo - vocal arrangement and vocals on "Religion song"
- Sandra Mihanovich - backing vocals on "Fue amor" and "Religion song"
- Celsa Mel Gowland - backing vocals on "Religion song"
- Analía Fink - backing vocals on "Religion song"
- Osvaldo Fattorusso - percussion on "Tercer mundo", "Yo te amé en Nicaragua" and "Y dale alegría a mi corazón"
- Tweety González - electronic keyboard on "Los buenos tiempos"
- Liliana Herrero - vocals on "Religion song"
- Fena Della Maggiora - backing vocals on "Fue amor"
- Luis Alberto Spinetta - vocals on "Y dale alegría a mi corazón", guitar on "Fue amor"
- Jorge "Bruja" Suárez - harmonica on "El chico de la tapa"
- Fernando Suárez Paz - violin on "B-Ode y Evelyn", "Tercer mundo", "Yo te amé en Nicaragua", "Carabelas de la nada", "Los buenos tiempos" and "Y dale alegría a mi corazón"
- Leonardo Suárez Paz - violin on "B-Ode y Evelyn", "Tercer mundo", "Yo te amé en Nicaragua", "Carabelas de la nada", "Los buenos tiempos" and "Y dale alegría a mi corazón"
- Alejandro Urdapilleta: cana on "El chico de la tapa"
- Hinchada - Pilo, Lucho, Ale, Pingüi, Fito on "El chico de la tapa" and "Tercer mundo"
- Marcelo Ferreyra - trombone
- Enrique Gioia - trumpet
- Víctor Malvicino - baritone saxophone
- Richard Mont - trumpet
- Pablo Rodríguez - tenor saxophone
- Víctor Skorutski - saxophone
- Carlos Villavicencio - arrangements and direction of strings and brass on "B-Ode y Evelyn", "Tercer mundo", "Yo te amé en Nicaragua", "Carabelas de la nada", "Los buenos tiempos" and "Y dale alegría a mi corazón"
