= Fito Páez =

Argentine musician

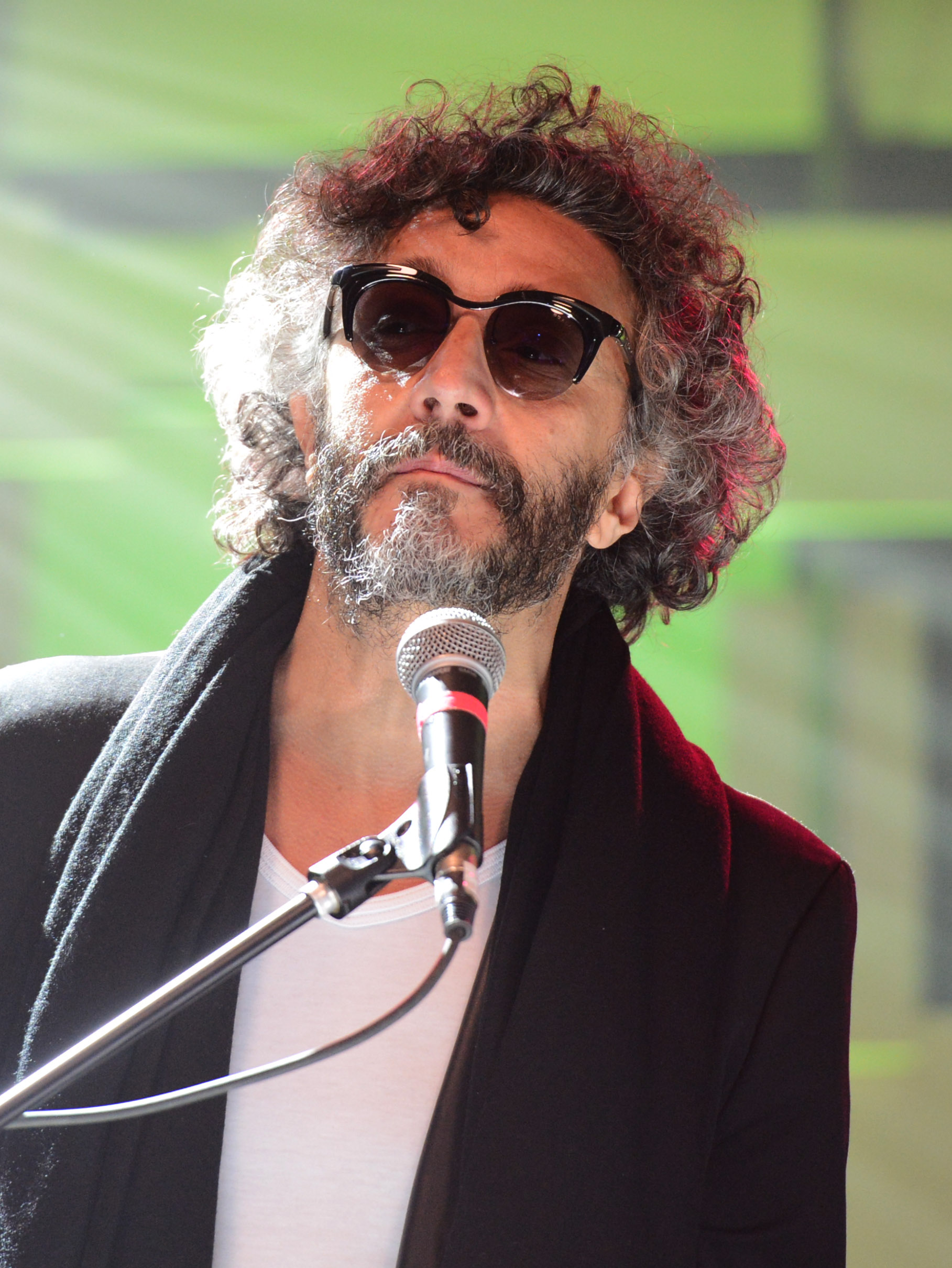
- Fito Páez in 2014

Background information
- Born: Rodolfo Páez; 13 March 1963 (age 63); Rosario, Argentina
- Genres: Rock; pop; tango-rock
- Occupations: Musician; filmmaker
- Instruments: Piano; vocals
- Years active: 1979–present
- Labels: Warner; Belgrano Norte; Sony
- Website: www.fitopaezmusica.com

Rodolfo "Fito" Páez (Spanish pronunciation: [ˈfito ˈpaes]; born 13 March 1963) is an Argentine Latin rock musician and filmmaker. A former member of the Trova Rosarina, he is dubbed the "Troubadour of Argentine rock" and is considered an important figure in the genre and in Latin music.

== Biography ==
=== Early career ===
Páez was born in Rosario, Santa Fe; his real name is Rodolfo Páez, like his father. When he was a child, people called him "Rodolfito" (in Spanish, the diminutive of masculine names is formed by adding "ito") to distinguish him from Rodolfo, his father. With time, Rodolfito became just "Fito," and that is where his stage name came from.

He formed Staff, his first band, when he was 13. In 1977, he played in El Banquete with Rubén Goldín and Jorge Llonch. He began to perform solo in pubs the following year.

Straight out of high school, he began touring with several bands and, soon after that, produced his first solo album, Del '63, which was released in 1984. It was promoted first in his hometown but later earned attention in Buenos Aires. The recording was put together with the help of some of Argentina's most prominent musicians, including Daniel Wirtz, Fabián Gallardo, Tweety González and Paul Dourge. The record won him critical acclaim as a songwriter and helped lead to future projects, including a 1985 album, Giros. The demo of that album earned him the praise of Luis Alberto Spinetta, as well as a partnership – Paez's next album, 1986's La La La was a duet with Spinetta. The duo supported that album with a tour that reached all the way to Santiago, Chile. The same year, he participated in the Thousand Days of Democracy festival.

His 1987 recording, Ciudad de Pobres Corazones, marked a dark, political turn for his work. It was dedicated to the memory of his aunt and grandmother, who were murdered in Rosario. Páez got his first taste of production work with Ey!, which was released in 1988. Recorded in New York City and Havana, it also showcased many musicians with whom he had worked previously.

=== 1990–present ===
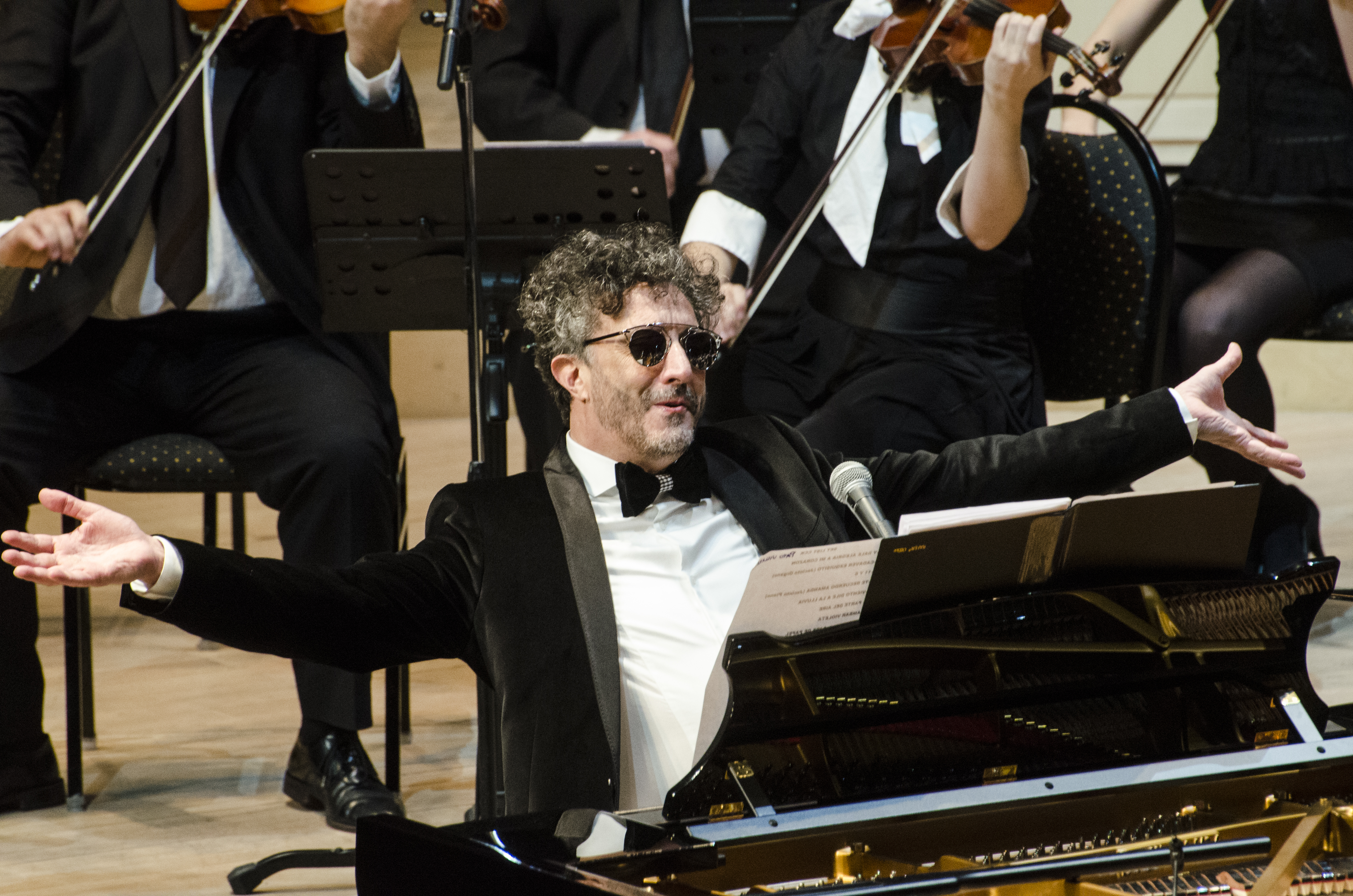
Páez with the Kashmir Orchestra at the Libertad Palace

Tercer Mundo, released in 1990, explored Latin American cultural influences and the harsh world of poverty and exploitation. It, too, was critically acclaimed, but it was Páez's 1992 album, El Amor Después del Amor which marked the pinnacle of his commercial success. The album sold more than 750,000 copies, and when Páez toured to support it, he found himself playing sold-out shows for 40,000 people. Shortly after this album's release, he played a benefit concert for UNICEF, which raised more than $420,000.

In 1990, Páez worked as a producer in Sandra Mihanovich and Celeste Carballo's album Mujer contra mujer.

The follow-up, Circo Beat, had impossibly high expectations. Though it had several hit songs, including "Mariposa Technicolor" and "Tema de Piluso," as well as a companion album, Circo Beat Brazil, which featured Brazilian remixes of its hits, it only sold around 350,000 copies. Several other projects were completed in the late '90s, including a live album, Euforia and 1998's Sabina & Páez: Enemigos Intimos, with Joaquín Sabina. The year 1999 brought another balanced, superbly produced album, Abre. He also took home two Grammys at the first annual Latin Grammy Awards in fall 2000. He lived with Argentine actress Cecilia Roth for some years; the couple adopted a child in 1999.

Páez's 2003 album Naturaleza sangre marked a return to his musical past, featuring appearances from Charly García, Luis Alberto Spinetta and Brazilian artist Rita Lee on the previously unreleased version of "Ojos Rojos." In 2006, Páez was given an escopetarra (a decommissioned AK-47 converted into a guitar) by Colombian musician and peace activist César López in honor of his music.

The album El mundo cabe en una canción won the Latin Grammy Award for Best Rock Solo Vocal Album at the Latin Grammy Awards of 2007. In 2008 Páez recorded, No se si es Baires o Madrid, in Madrid, Spain. He invited several important musicians such as Pablo Milanés, Joaquín Sabina, and Ariel Rot to participate. In 2010, he released the album Confiá.. In December 2011; he recorded a new album with songs by other artists performed by Páez himself in a release called Canciones para áliens. This album was presented at la Sala Nezahualcoyolt de la Universidad Nacional Autónoma de México. In January 2012, these "songs for the aliens" were transmitted to space via electromagnetic waves through the Music to Space project. In 2021, Páez was presented with the Latin Grammy Lifetime Achievement Award.

== Discography ==
=== Studio albums ===
- Del 63 (1984)
- Giros (1985)
- La la la (1986) (with Luis Alberto Spinetta)
- Ciudad de pobres corazones (1987)
- Ey! (1988)
- Tercer mundo (1990)
- El Amor Después del Amor (1992)
- Circo Beat (1994)
- Enemigos íntimos (1998) (with Joaquín Sabina)
- Abre (1999)
- Rey Sol (2000)
- Naturaleza sangre (2003)
- Moda y pueblo (2005)
- El Mundo Cabe en Una Canción (2006)
- Rodolfo (2007)
- Confiá (2010)
- Canciones para Aliens (2011)
- El Sacrificio (2013)
- Dreaming Rosario (2013)
- Yo Te Amo (2013)
- Rock and Roll Revolution – RRR (2014)
- Locura total (2015) (with Paulinho Moska)
- La ciudad liberada (2017)
- La Conquista del Espacio (2020)
- Los Años Salvajes (2021)
- Futurología Arlt (2022)
- The Golden Light (2022)
- EADDA9223 (2023)
- Novela (2025)
- Shine (2026)

=== Live albums ===
- Euforia (1996)
- Mi vida con ellas (2004)
- No sé si es Baires o Madrid (2008)
- El amor después del amor 20 años (2012)

=== Compilation albums ===
- Grandes éxitos (1990)
- Crónica (1991)
- Lo mejor de Fito Páez (1993)
- Lo mejor de los mejores – Volume 1 and 2 (1995/1996)
- Lo duro/Lo suave de Fito Páez (1996)
- Colección aniversario (1999)
- Fue amor (2000)
- Antología (2002)
- Serie de oro: grandes éxitos (2002)
- Músicos, poetas y locos (2003)
- Super 6 (2003)
- Gran reserva (2005)
- Grandes canciones (2008)

=== Tributes ===
- Homenaje a Fito Páez (2006)

== Filmography ==
- Vidas privadas ("Private Lives") (2001)
- ¿De quién es el portaligas? (2007) ("Whose is the garter belt?")
- Women on the Edge (2023) as Director

== In fiction ==
- Páez is portrayed by several actors in the TV series El amor después del amor.

== Awards and nominations ==
Award	Year	Category	Nominated work	Result	Ref.
Grammy Awards	2001	Best Latin Rock/Alternative Album	Abre	Nominated	
Grammy Awards	2021	Best Latin Rock or Alternative Album	La Conquista del Espacio	Won	
Grammy Awards	2023	Best Latin Rock or Alternative Album	Los Años Salvajes	Nominated	
Latin Grammy Awards (Note: At the 1st Annual Latin Grammy Awards, Frank Filipetti received a nomination for Best Engineered Album as engineer for Abre. At the 13th Annual Latin Grammy Awards, Alejandro Ros received a nomination for Best Recording Package as the art director for Canciones Para Aliens.)	2000	Song of the Year	"Al Lado del Camino"	Nominated	
Latin Grammy Awards	2000	Best Male Rock Vocal Performance	"Al Lado del Camino"	Won	
Latin Grammy Awards	2000	Best Rock Song	"Al Lado del Camino"	Won	
Latin Grammy Awards	2000	Best Rock Album	Abre	Nominated	
Latin Grammy Awards	2001	Best Rock Song	"El Diablo de tu Corazón"	Nominated	
Latin Grammy Awards	2001	Best Short Form Music Video	"El Diablo de tu Corazón"	Nominated	
Latin Grammy Awards	2001	Best Rock Solo Vocal Album	Rey Sol	Nominated	
Latin Grammy Awards	2004	Best Rock Solo Vocal Album	Naturaleza Sangre	Nominated	
Latin Grammy Awards	2005	Best Rock Solo Vocal Album	Mi Vida con Ellas	Nominated	
Latin Grammy Awards	2005	Best Rock Song	"Polaroid de Locura Ordinaria"	Nominated	
Latin Grammy Awards	2007	Best Rock Solo Vocal Album	El Mundo Cabe en Una Canción	Won	
Latin Grammy Awards	2008	Best Singer-Songwriter Album	Rodolfo	Won	
Latin Grammy Awards	2009	Best Male Pop Vocal Album	No Sé Si Es Baires o Madrid	Won	
Latin Grammy Awards	2013	Best Long Form Music Video	El Amor Después del Amor: 20 Años	Nominated	
Latin Grammy Awards	2016	Song of the Year	"Hermanos" (with Moska)	Nominated	
Latin Grammy Awards	2018	Song of the Year	"Tu Vida, Mi Vida"	Nominated	
Latin Grammy Awards	2018	Best Rock Song	"Tu Vida, Mi Vida"	Won	
Latin Grammy Awards	2020	Album of the Year	La Conquista del Espacio	Nominated	
Latin Grammy Awards	2020	Best Pop/Rock Album	La Conquista del Espacio	Won	
Latin Grammy Awards	2020	Best Pop/Rock Song	"La Canción de las Bestias"	Won	
Latin Grammy Awards	2021	Lifetime Achievement Award	Himself	Won	
Latin Grammy Awards	2022	Best Pop/Rock Album	Los Años Salvajes	Won	
Latin Grammy Awards	2022	Best Pop/Rock Song	"Babel"	Won	
Latin Grammy Awards	2022	Best Rock Song	"Lo Mejor de Nuestras Vidas"	Won	
Latin Grammy Awards	2023	Album of the Year	EADDA9223	Nominated	
Latin Grammy Awards	2025	Best Rock Album	Novela	Pending	
Latin Grammy Awards	2025	Best Rock Song	"Sale el Sol"	Pending	
MTV Europe Music Awards	2023	Best Latin America South Act	Himself	Nominated	
Premios Gardel	2001	Best Rock Artist	Rey Sol	Won	
Premios Gardel	2001	Best Music Video	"El Diablo en Tu Corazón"	Won	
Premios Gardel	2005	Best Rock Solo Album	Mi Vida Con Ellas	Nominated	
Premios Gardel	2006	Best Male Rock Album	Moda y Pueblo	Nominated	
Premios Gardel	2008	Best Rock Solo Album	Rodolfo	Nominated	
Premios Gardel	2009	Best Testimonial Artist Album	No Sé Si Es Baires o Madrid	Won	
Premios Gardel	2009	Best DVD	No Sé Si Es Baires o Madrid	Nominated	
Premios Gardel	2015	Best Rock Solo Album	Rock and Roll Revolution	Nominated	
Premios Gardel	2018	Best Male Rock Album	La Ciudad Liberada	Nominated	
Premios Gardel	2021	Album of the Year	La Conquista del Espacio	Won	
Premios Gardel	2021	Best Rock Album	La Conquista del Espacio	Won	
Premios Gardel	2021	Song of the Year	"La Canción de las Bestias"	Nominated	
Premios Gardel	2021	Collaboration of the Year	"Gente en la Calle" (with Lali)	Nominated	
Premios Gardel	2021	Producer of the Year	Himself (with Diego Olivero & Gustavo Borner)	Won	
Premios Gardel	2022	Best Rock Solo Album	Los Años Salvajes	Nominated	
Premios Gardel	2023	Best Singer-Songwriter Album	The Golden Light	Nominated	
Premios Gardel	2023	Best Conceptual Album	Futurología Arlt	Won	
Premios Gardel	2023	Best Instrumental Fusion / World Music Album	Futurología Arlt	Nominated	
Premios Gardel	2023	Best Music Video	"Los Años Salvajes"	Nominated	
Premios Quiero	2021	Best Rock Video	"Gente en la Calle" (with Lali)	Nominated	
Rolling Stone en Español Awards	2023	Artist of the Year	Himself	Nominated	
Rolling Stone en Español Awards	2023	Album of the Year	Futurología Arlt	Nominated	
