= Gala Évora =

Spanish singer and actress

Gala Évora (born 8 February 1983) is a Spanish singer and actress who has recorded a number of hit songs and received two of her country's top acting nominations for her leading role portraying Lola Flores in the 2007 film Lola, the Movie.

== Family tradition ==
A native of the southern Andalucían town of Sanlúcar de Barrameda in Cádiz province, Gala Évora was born into an artistic family (the Sanlúcar Évoras) with a long tradition in the world of entertainment. Her father, José Miguel Évora, is a music producer, and the guitar artist Manolo Sanlúcar is her uncle. At the age of eight, she made her film debut, playing a small, unbilled role in El día que nací yo, a 1991 vehicle for star Isabel Pantoja.

== Performing career ==
She has performed as a member of the pop group Papá Levante and was a chorus member for headliner singers such as Carmen Linares, Enrique Morente, Camarón de la Isla and Falete. At the end of 2000, her own debut album with the group, Tomalacaté, with hit songs Me pongo colorada and Practicar sexo sold over a quarter of a million copies and was listed as a contender for the highest-grossing Spanish album of the year. In 2001, Papá Levante was awarded Premio Ondas as the best new Spanish music group and her performances in their 2003 album, Sopla levante, with its two noted singles, "Comunicando" and "Gorda" also met with success, as did the 2005 album, Pa ti, pa mí, with the hit first single, "Chiquilla". Her first solo album, Agua y luz, includes six songs by Carlos Sanlúcar, and versions covered by Salif Keita, Quique González, Lila Downs and Luis Pastor. The album begins with "Al otro lado del mundo" and includes "Tengo un amor", "Sabré que eres tú" and "Agua de rosas", composed for Lila Downs' Mexican album, while "Quiero volar" is a blend of flamenco rhythms.

In 2007, Gala Évora was cast in the title role of Miguel Hermoso's film, Lola, a biographical portrait of Spain's famed Romani singer, dancer and actress Lola Flores, which gained her a Goya, Spain's equivalent of the Oscar, nomination as Mejor Actriz Revelación [Best New Actress] and a Spanish Cinema Writers Circle Awards nomination as Premio Revelación [Best New Artist]. The film has played at a number of European venues and was chosen as the opening entry at the Málaga Film Festival. The following year she was chosen for a role in Pilar Távora's film adaptation of Santiago Escalante's play Madre amadísima.

== Discography as Papá Levante member ==
- Tomalacaté, 2000
- Sopla Levante, 2003
- Pa Ti Pa Mí, 2005

== Filmography ==
- El día que nací yo, 1991
- Lola, 2007
- Madre Amadísima, 2010
