= La conquista del espacio =

La Conquista del Espacio

Studio album by Fito Páez
- Released: March 13, 2020
- Recorded: 2019
- Studio: Capitol (Los Ángeles)
- Genre: Rock en español
- Length: 37:15
- Label: Sony Argentina
- Producer: Fito Páez; Diego Olivero

Fito Páez chronology
La Ciudad Liberada (2017)	La Conquista del Espacio (2020)	Los Años Salvajes (2021)

Singles from La Conquista del Espacio
- 1. "Resucitar" Released: February 14, 2020; 2. "La Canción de las Bestias" Released: May 22, 2020; 3. "Maelström" Released: October 9, 2020; 4. "Gente en la Calle" Released: March 4, 2021

La Conquista del Espacio is the twenty-fourth studio album by Argentine singer Fito Páez, released on March 13, 2020, by Sony Music Argentina. The album was produced entirely by Páez, Diego Olivero and Gustavo Borner. The album features guest vocals by Lali and Hernán Coronel of Mala Fama.

In 2021, the album won a Grammy Award for Best Latin Rock or Alternative Album.

== Awards and nominations ==
Awards and nominations for La Conquista del Espacio
Year	Organization	Award	Result	Ref.
2020	Latin Grammy Award	Album of the Year	Nominated	
2020	Latin Grammy Award	Best Pop/Rock Album	Won	
2021	Grammy Award	Best Latin Rock or Alternative Album	Won	
2021	Gardel Awards	Album of the Year	Won	
2021	Gardel Awards	Best Rock Album	Won	
2021	Gardel Awards	Producer of the Year	Won	
2021	Gardel Awards	Best Recording Engineering	Won	

=== Songs ===
Awards and nominations for songs from La Conquista del Espacio
Year	Organization	Song	Award	Result	Ref.
2021	Gardel Awards	Song of the Year	"La Canción de las Bestias"	Nominated	
2021	Gardel Awards	Collaboration of the Year	"Gente en la Calle" (with Lali)	Nominated	
2021	Premios Quiero	Best Rock Video	"Gente en la Calle" (with Lali)	Nominated	

== Track listing ==
La Conquista del Espacio track listing
No.	Title	Writer(s)	Producer(s)	Length
1.	"La Conquista del Espacio (The Space Conquering)"	Fito Páez	Fito Páez; Diego Olivero; Gustavo Borner	4:14
2.	"Resucitar (Rise)"	Páez	Páez; Olivero; Borner	3:04
3.	"Las Cosas que Me Hacen Bien (The Things That Make Good to Me)"	Páez	Páez; Olivero; Borner	4:18
4.	"La Canción de las Bestias (The Beasts Song)"	Páez	Páez; Olivero; Borner	4:09
5.	"Gente en la Calle (Street People)" (featuring Lali)	Páez	Páez; Olivero; Borner	3:59
6.	"Ey, You! (Hey, You!)" (featuring Mala Fama)	Páez; Hernán Coronel	Páez; Olivero; Borner	4:10
7.	"Nadie Es de Nadie (Nobody is Nobody's)"	Páez	Páez; Olivero; Borner	4:14
8.	"Maelström"	Páez	Páez; Olivero; Borner	5:07
9.	"Todo Se Olvida (Everything is Forgotten)"	Páez	Páez; Olivero; Borner	4:27
Total length:				37:15
