= Liliana Herrero =

Argentine musician

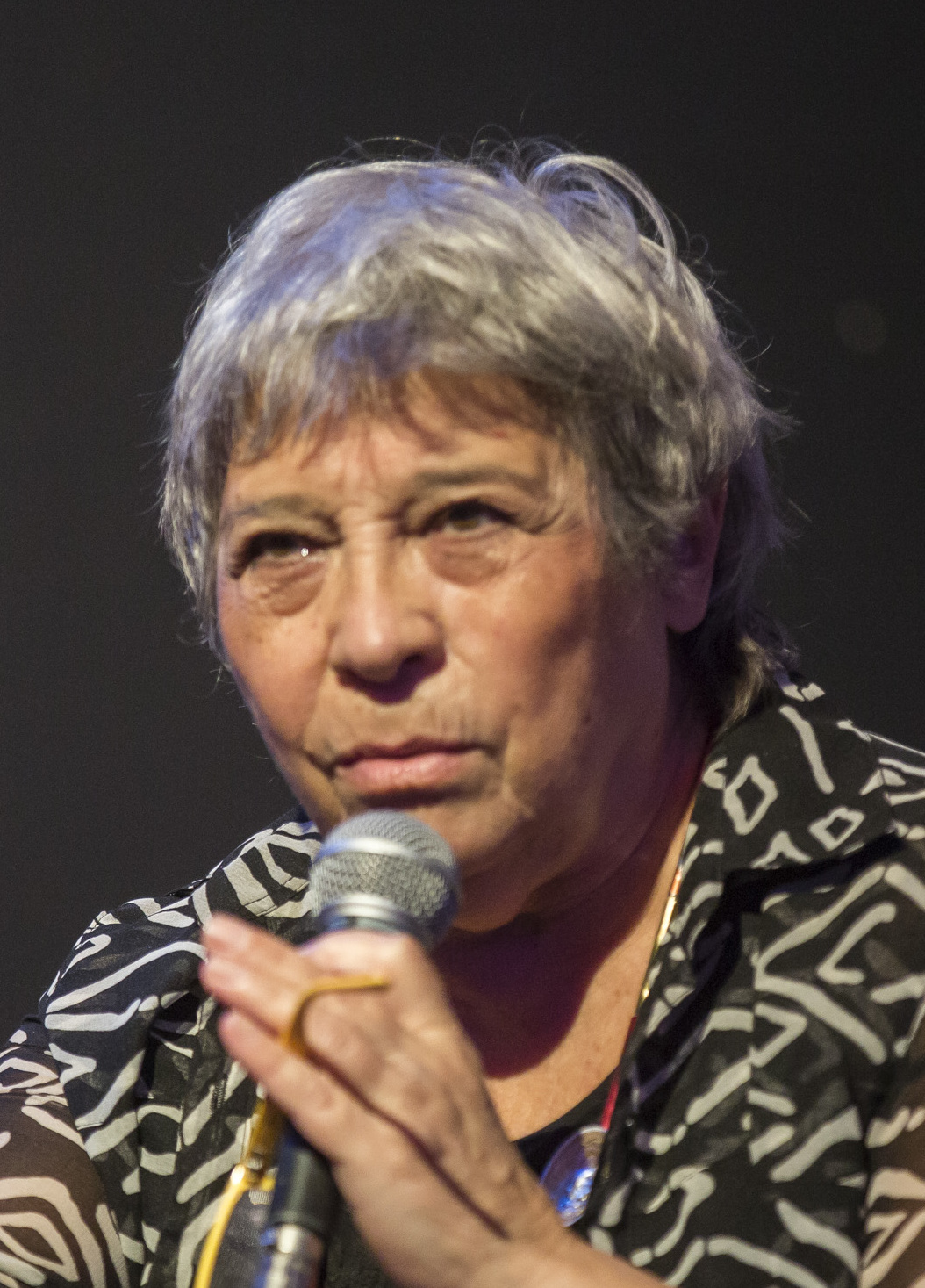
Liliana Herrero in 2021

Liliana Herrero is an Argentine musician born in 1948 in Villaguay, Entre Ríos. In 1966, she moved to Rosario, Santa Fe, in order to study Philosophy, and has since become an adoptive citizen.

In her youth, she took part in the vocal groups Contracanto and Canto Libre. She was arrested by the military government for her involvement in Peronist movements.

In Rosario, she met the local singer and composer Fito Páez, who convinced her of abandoning her teaching career and become a professional singer. Páez was the producer of Herrero's first record, in 1987. This album was also the first that Páez produced. Its music was what they called "supermodern folklore". In 1989 Páez also produced Herrero's second album.

Herrero said once that her music not a fusion between Argentine folklore and rock, as some had defined it, but a culture clash — two different traditions facing each other.

In 1993, Herrero released her third album, Isla del Tesoro ("Treasure Island"), with several guests, including Fito Páez, Ricardo Mollo (Divididos), Claudia Puyó and Beto Satragni.

In 1995, she received the Konex Award as one of the best five interpreters of the decade. She was the Argentine representative in the Non-Governmental Organizations Forum of the International Women's Conference in Beijing, China. Her performance was broadcast by national radio.
