= Circo Beat =

Studio album by Fito Páez
- Released: 1994
- Genres: Rock en español Argentine rock
- Length: 55:12
- Language: Spanish
- Label: Warner Music
- Producers: Fito Páez; Phil Manzanera

Fito Páez chronology
Lo mejor de Fito Páez (1993)	Circo Beat (1994)	Lo mejor de los mejores – Volumen 1 y 2 (1995)

Professional ratings
Review scores
Source	Rating
Allmusic	4/5 stars

Circo Beat (Circus Beat) is the eighth studio album by Argentine musician Fito Páez, released in 1994. It was produced by Phil Manzanera. It sold 190,000 copies in Argentina.

== Track listing ==
All tracks are written by Fito Páez.

No.	Title	Length
1.	"Circo Beat [Beat Circus]"	5:44
2.	"Mariposa Tecknicolor [Tecknicolor Butterfly ]"	3:43
3.	"Normal 1"	3:00
4.	"Las Tardes del Sol, Las Noches del Agua [The afternoons of the sun, the nights of the water]"	5:46
5.	"Tema de Piluso [Piluso's Theme]"	4:11
6.	"She's Mine"	4:33
7.	"El Jardin Donde Vuelan los Mares [The garden where the seas fly]"	5:59
8.	"Nadie Detiene Al Amor en un Lugar [Nobody stops the love in one place]"	2:19
9.	"Si Disney Despertase [If Disney woke up]"	3:47
10.	"Soy un Hippie [I'm a hippie]"	4:26
11.	"Dejarlas Partir [Let them go]"	3:06
12.	"Lo Que el Viento Nunca Se Llevo [What the wind never took]"	4:18
13.	"Nada del Mundo Real [Nothing of the real world]"	4:41

== Sales ==
Region	Certification	Certified units/sales
Argentina	—	217,000

== Personnel ==
Performers

- Fito Páez – vocals, acoustic guitar, pianos, hammond, clavinet, electric keyboard
- Gabriel Carámbula – acoustic and electric guitars
- Gringui Herrera – acoustic and electric guitars, and pedal steel guitar
- Guillermo Vadalá – bass, acoustic guitar, double bass
- Geoff Dugmore: drums, bass drum and tambourin on "Dejarlas partir"
- Tweety González – accordion, piano, electric keyboard

Guest musicians

- Fabiana Cantilo – vocals; gremlins on "El jardín donde vuelan los mares"; chorus on all other songs
- Fena Della Maggiora – vocals on "El jardín donde vuelan los mares"
- Liliana Herrero – vocals on "Las tardes del sol, las noches del agua"
- Claudia Puyó – gremlis on "El jardín donde vuelan los mares"
- Fabián Gallardo – acoustic guitar on "Dejarlas partir"
- Laura Vázquez – electric keyboard
- Alina Gandini – electric keyboard
- Pilo – harmonica on "Circo beat"
- Toots Thielemans – harmonica on "Las tardes del sol, las noches del agua" and "She's mine"
- Osvaldo Fattoruso – drums on "Las tardes del sol, las noches del agua" and "Nadie detiene al amor en un lugar"
- The Kick Horns – winds on "Circo beat"
- Simon Clark – saxophones: alto and baritone, flute
- Tim Sanders – tenor saxophone
- Simon Gardner – trombone
- Roddy Lorimer – trumpet
- Neil Sidwell – trombone
