= Carolina Minella =

- Born: April 27, 1979 (age 46); Córdoba Province, Argentina
- Genres: Tango, milonga, bossa nova, jazz, chanson
- Occupation(s): Singer, songwriter
- Instrument: Voice
- Years active: 2003–present
- Labels: Warner Music

Carolina Minella is an Argentine singer, songwriter and actress, winner of a Gardel Award in 2018 for best new tango artist album for her eponymous record production, and nominated in the same event in the category of best tango artist album in 2021 for her album Génesis.

== Biography ==
=== Early life and studies ===
Minella was born in the town of Los Surgentes, located in the province of Córdoba, in 1979. She became interested in music at an early age, and later trained in singing with artists and teachers like Laura Hatton and Katie Viqueira. She obtained a degree as Superior Performer of Music with Tango Orientation at the Instituto Superior de Música Popular del Sindicato Argentino de Músicos SADEM in Buenos Aires. Minella also received acting training with directors like Carlos Gandolfo, Rubens Correa and Javier Margulis, and in musical comedy with playwright Pepe Cibrián Campoy.

=== Career ===
In 2003 Minella played one of the supporting roles in the film Ilusión de movimiento, by Héctor Molina. As a tango, bossa nova and jazz singer she toured Italy, France and Switzerland between 2006 and 2007, and a year later she toured several cities in Colombia as part of the Medellín International Tango Festival; in 2014 she was invited again to the event in its eighth edition. In 2009 Minella competed in the TV show Operación Triunfo, broadcast by the Telefe network.

In 2013 she released her first full-length album, titled Alma de loca, under the Epsa Music label. In November 2017 she released her eponymous album through Acqua Records, and a year later she won a Gardel Award in the category of best album by a new tango artist. In March 2019 she performed at the Espacio Clarín event along with musician Jorge Vázquez.

In 2021, Minella released her third studio album, titled Génesis and edited by Acqua Records. The album is based on the work Las ciudades by Astor Piazolla and Horacio Ferrer, and features compositions by Pasión Vega, Carlos Gardel, David Lebón and Gilbert Bécaud, among others. At the support concerts, she had the participation of artists like Rocío Araujo and Amelita Baltar, and donated the proceeds of one of her streaming shows to the Association Against Multiple Sclerosis, a disease suffered by her. The same year she earned a new nomination at the Gardel Awards in its 23rd edition, in the category of best album by a tango artist.

In 2023 she released a new album titled Minella, edited by Warner Music. The record contains the previously unreleased song "Tal vez", written by Amelita Baltar.

== Discography ==
=== Studio albums ===
Year	Title	Label	Ref.
2013	Alma de loca	Epsa Music	
2017	Carolina Minella	Acqua Records	
2021	Génesis	Acqua Records	
2023	Minella	Warner Music	

== Filmography ==
Year	Title	Role	Ref.
2003	Ilusión de movimiento	Graciela	
2009	Operación Triunfo	Contestant	

== Awards and nominations ==
Year	Event	Category	Nominated work	Result	Ref.
2018	Premios Gardel	Best album by a new tango artist	Carolina Minella	Won	
2021	Premios Gardel	Best album by a tango artist	Génesis	Nominated	
