= Latin Grammy Award for Best Rock Solo Vocal Album =

Annual music award from 2001 to 2009

- Awarded for: vocal rock, hard rock or metal albums containing at least 51% of newly recorded material
- Country: United States
- Presented by: The Latin Recording Academy
- First award: 2001
- Final award: 2009
- Website: latingrammy.com

The Latin Grammy Award for Best Rock Solo Vocal Album was an honor presented annually at the Latin Grammy Awards, a ceremony conducted by the Latin Academy of Recording Arts & Sciences to "recognize excellence and create a wider awareness of the cultural diversity" and contributions of Latin recording artists in the United States and internationally. According to the category description guide for the 2009 Latin Grammy Awards, the award was given to vocal rock, hard rock or metal albums containing at least 51 percent of newly recorded material. It was given to a male or female artist.

The award was first presented at the Latin Grammy Awards of 2001. Before its introduction, the rock categories were separated by gender and ensembles, with an additional award for Best Rock Album. At the Latin Grammy Awards of 2010 two rock categories were presented, Rock Album and Best Rock Song. No information was released regarding the absence or possible withdrawal of the Best Rock Solo Vocal Album category.

Argentinian artists have won the award more times than any other nationality. Colombian singer-songwriter Juanes has won the most awards in the category, with three wins out of the same number of nominations. Mexican performers Alejandra Guzmán and Julieta Venegas are the only female singers to be awarded. Fito Páez and Luis Alberto Spinetta are the most nominated performers, with four nominations each. Draco Rosa became the last recipient of the award in 2009, for the album Teatro.

== Recipients ==
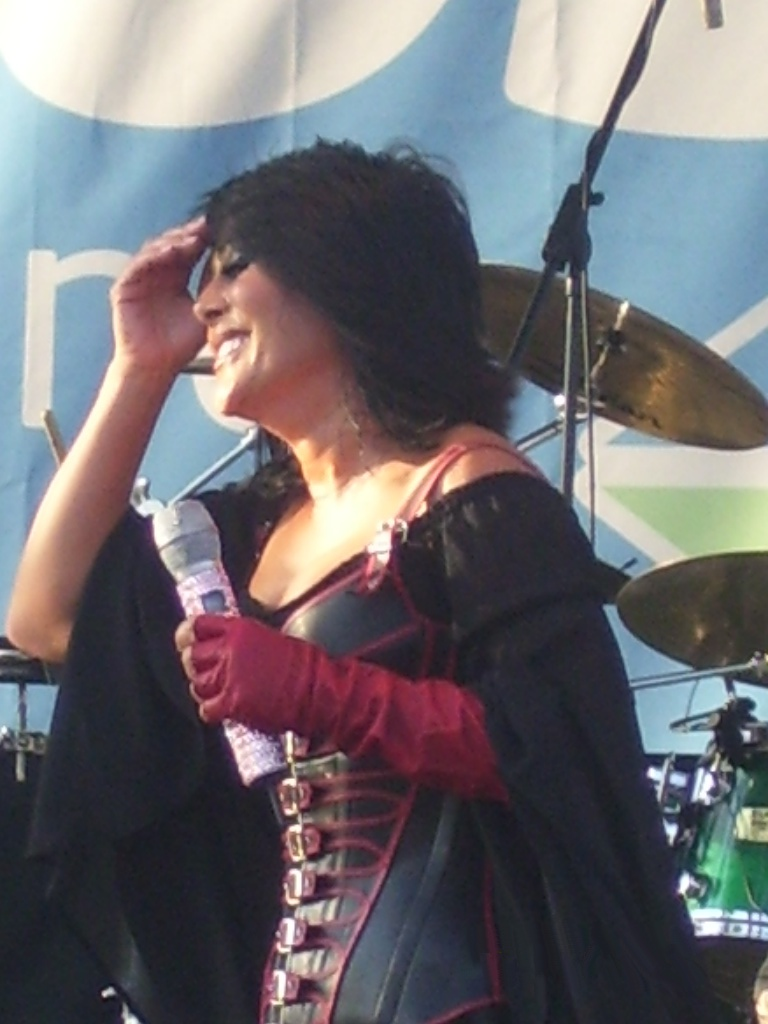
Alejandra Guzmán won the award in 2001 with her tenth studio album, Soy

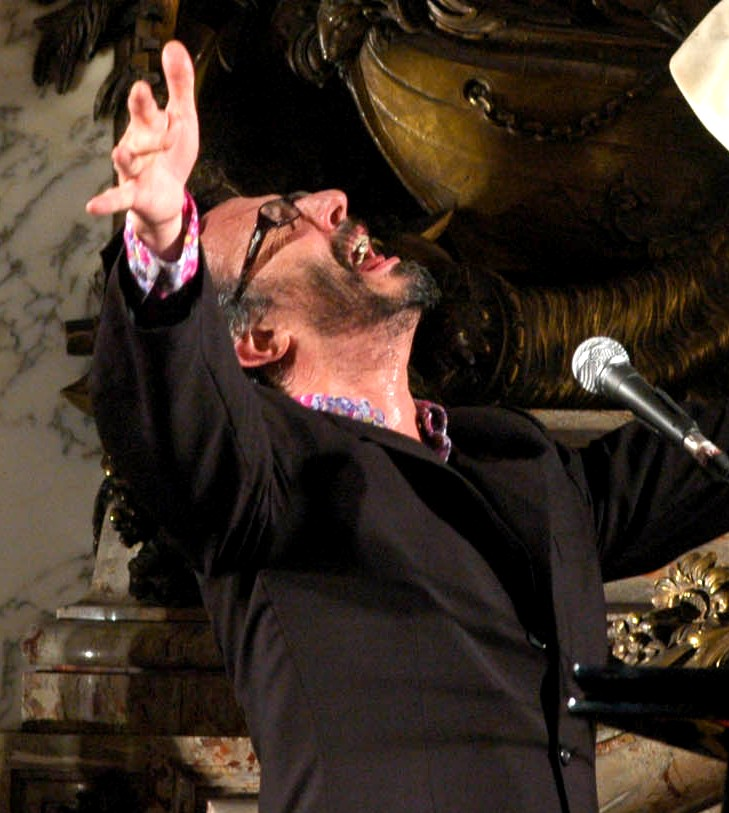
Fito Páez won the award in 2007 for the album El Mundo Cabe en Una Canción

Year^{[I]}	Performing artist(s)	Work	Nominees^{[II]}	Ref.
2001	Juanes	Fíjate Bien	Rosendo Mercado – Canciones para Normales y Mero Dementes; Fito Páez – Rey Sol; Cecilia Toussaint – Cecilia Toussaint; Julieta Venegas – Bueninvento	
2002	Alejandra Guzmán	Soy	Celeste Carballo – Celeste Acústica; León Gieco – Bandidos Rurales; Miguel Ríos – Miguel Ríos y las Estrellas del Rock Latino; Luis Alberto Spinetta – Silver Sorgo	
2003	Juanes	Un Día Normal	Gustavo Cerati – Siempre es Hoy; Charly García – Influencia; Natalia Lafourcade – Natalia Lafourcade; Luis Alberto Spinetta – Obras En Vivo	
2004	Julieta Venegas	Sí	Charly García – Rock & Roll Yo; Alejandra Guzmán – Lipstick; Fito Páez – Naturaleza Sangre; Luis Alberto Spinetta – Para los Arboles	
2005	Juanes	Mi Sangre	Enrique Bunbury – El Viaje a Ninguna Parte; JD Natasha – Imperfecta-Imperfect; Fito Páez – Mi Vida con Ellas; Revolver – Mestizo	
2006	Gustavo Cerati	Ahí Vamos	Belén Arjona – Infinito; Fabiana Cantilo – Inconsciente Colectivo; Alejandra Guzmán – Indeleble; Ariel Rot – Ahora Piden tu Cabeza	
2007	Fito Páez	El Mundo Cabe en Una Canción	Belo y los Susodichos – Pisando lo Fregao; Iván Ferreiro – Las Siete y Media; Rosendo Mercado – El Endémico Embustero y el Incauto Pertinaz; Ariel Rot – Dúos, Tríos y Otras Perversiones	
2008	Andrés Calamaro	La Lengua Popular	Chetes – Efecto Dominó; Alih Jey – Necia; Juanse – Energía Divina; Loquillo – Balmoral; Siddartha – Why You?	
2009	Draco Rosa	Teatro	Enrique Bunbury – Hellville de Luxe; Beto Cuevas – Miedo Escénico; Miguel Ríos – Solo o en Compañía de Otros; Luis Alberto Spinetta – Un Mañana	

== Notes ==
^{^[I]} Each year is linked to the article about the Latin Grammy Awards held that year.
^{^[II]} The nationality of the performing artist(s).
^{^[III]} The name of the performer and the nominated album

== See also ==
- Grammy Award for Best Solo Rock Vocal Performance
