= Sol Pereyra =

Argentine singer, musician, and composer

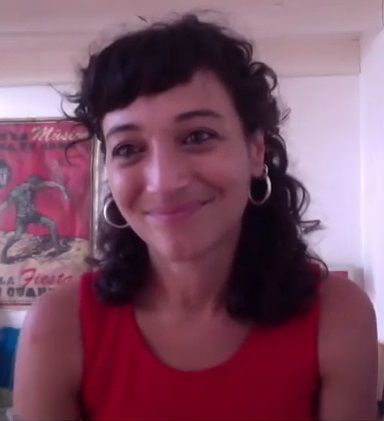
- Pereyra in 2021

Background information
- Origin: Godoy Cruz, Mendoza, Argentina
- Genres: Rock en español, Latin pop
- Instruments: Voice, guitar, trumpet
- Labels: GLD, S Music Argentina
- Formerly of: Los Cocineros
- Website: Solpereyra.com.ar

Sol Pereyra is an Argentinean singer, musician and composer who began her solo career in Mexico in 2009. She has received three nominations for the Gardel Awards, for her album Tírame agua (2014), for her single "Antireversa" (2019) and for her album Resisto (2020) in the best alternative pop album category.

== Career ==
=== Los Cocineros ===
Together with Mara Santucho and Alfonso Barbieri she formed the trio Los Cocineros in 2001 in the province of Córdoba. A year later she released with the trio the album Peras al elmo, followed by La hazaña rellena in 2004. Later she recorded the albums Niños revueltos and Morrón y cuenta nueva before leaving the group to begin a solo career.

=== Solo career ===
After participating on the Julieta Venegas album MTV Unplugged in 2008, she moved to Mexico, where she has developed much of her solo career. To date, Pereyra has released six albums, Bla bla bla (2009), Comunmixta (2012), Tírame agua (2014), Préndete (2017), Resisto (2019) and Existo (2020). Her song "Nadie te preguntó", from the album Tírame agua, earned her international recognition, registering more than ten million views on YouTube. Her 2020 single "De aquí para allá" was included in the Netflix series La casa de las flores.

In August 2020 she was called to perform a tribute to commemorate the 30th anniversary of the album Canción Animal by the band Soda Stereo, accompanied by other artists such as Pedro Aznar, El Kuelgue and Lisandro Aristimuño. Pereyra covered the song "Un millón de años luz", second track of the mentioned album.

== Discography ==
=== With Los Cocineros ===
- Peras al olmo (2001) Independent
- La hazaña rellena (2002) Independent
- Niños revueltos (2003) Independent
- Morrón y cuenta nueva (2004) GLD
- Platos voladores (2005) GLD
- Los cocineros en vivo en el Teatro Comedia (2006) Independent
- Diente libre (2009) Independent

=== As a soloist ===
- Blablabla (2009) Independent
- Comunmixta (2011) S Music Argentina
- Tírame agua (2014) S Music Argentina
- Préndete (2017) S Music Argentina
- Resisto (2019) S Music Argentina/Cassette México
- Existo (2020)
