= Lisandro Aristimuño =

Argentine musician (born 1978)

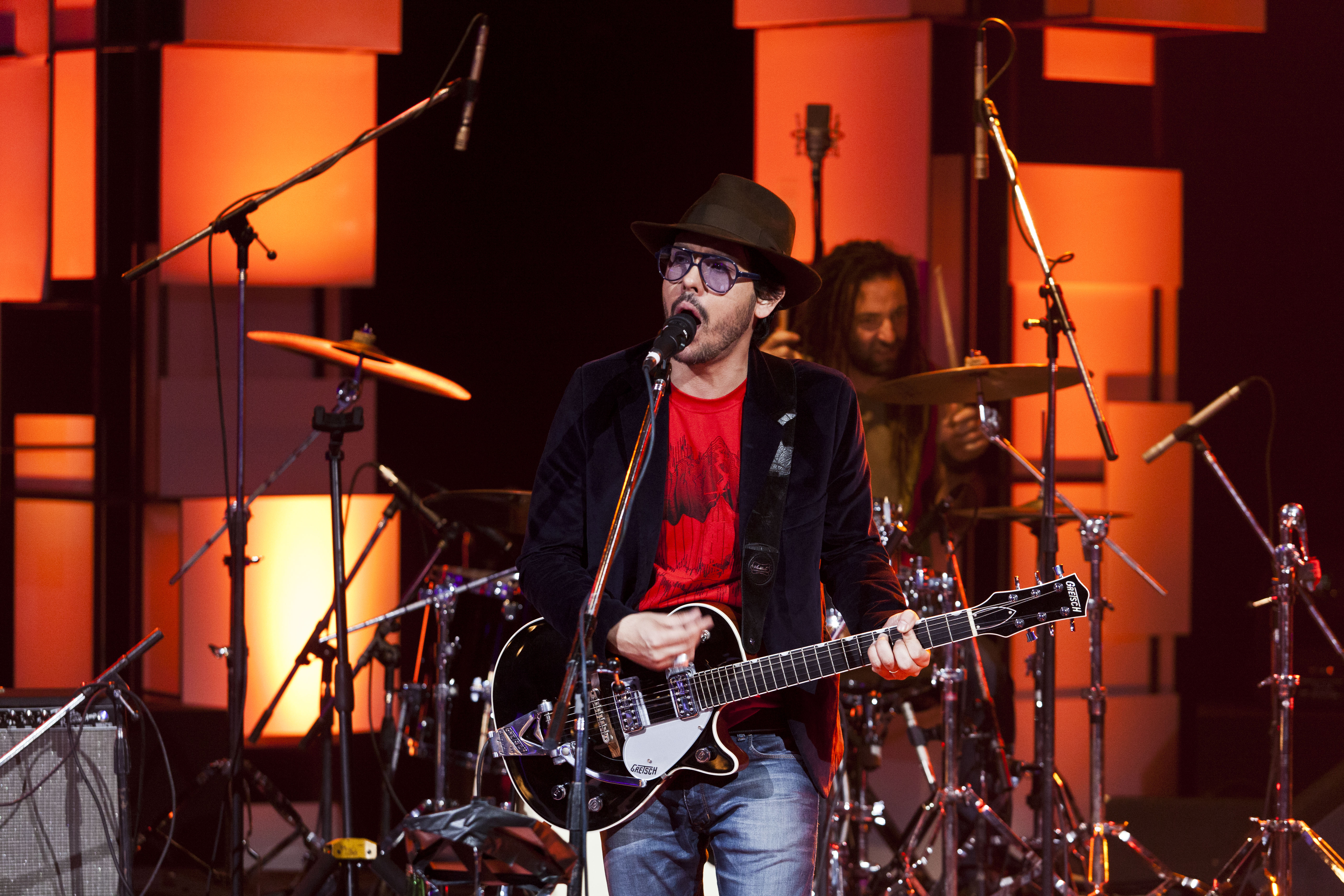

Background information
- Born: Lisandro Aristimuño; 26 October 1978; Viedma, Argentina
- Genres: World music, folk, pop, rock
- Occupations: Singer-songwriter, producer
- Instruments: Vocals, guitar, drums, keyboards, bass
- Website: lisandroaristi.ar

Lisandro Aristimuño is a musician and singer-songwriter from Argentina. His music combines rock, pop and electronica with traditional genres like Argentine folk music. His father was a theatre director and his mother was an actress. He was born in Viedma, capital of the province of Río Negro. His childhood was spent in Viedma and in Luis Beltrán, another town in this north Patagonian province.

== Musical career ==
He is self-taught as a musician and at the age of 14 began to perform as singer and guitarist in the Viedma bands Marca Registrada and La Bisogna, playing cover versions. Five years later, having left these bands, he played with the musician Fernando Barilá while continuing to work on his own material.

At the end of 2001 Aristimuño moved to Buenos Aires, where he completed the songs on his first album, Azules Turquesas (2004, Los Años Luz Discos). His second album, Ese asunto de la ventana, appeared in 2005, and his third, 39º, two years later in 2007.

His fourth album, the double-sided Las crónicas del viento (2009), was released on his own record label, "Viento azul discos" (Blue Wind Discs). Las Crónicas del viento won the Gardel Prize for best alternative rock/pop album of 2010.

Aristimuño has worked as a producer on Mariana Baraj's Margarita y Azucena, Tomi Lebrero's Me arrepiento de todo, Tomás Aristimuño's Verde árbol, and Liliana Herrero's "Maldigo".

In 2012, he released Mundo Anfibio, his fifth album, on which he oversaw the arrangements, musical direction and production and performed with Ricardo Mollo, Hilda Lizarazu and Boom Boom Kid as invited musicians. Mundo Anfibio was nominated at the Latin Grammys 2012 in the category "best alternative album" and won the Gardel Prize for best alternative rock/pop album in 2013.

== Discography ==
- Azules Turquesas (2004)
- Ese Asunto de la Ventana (2005)
- 39º (2007)
- Las Crónicas del Viento (2009)
- Mundo Anfibio (2012)
- Constelaciones (2016)
