= History of folkloric music in Argentina =

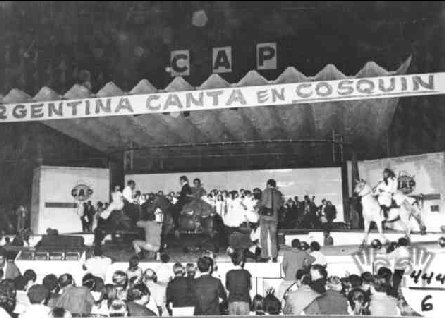
Atahualpa Yupanqui on stage at the traditional Cosquín Festival, one of the main folkloric music festivals of Argentina

The folkloric music of Argentina traces its roots to the multiplicity of native indigenous cultures. It was shaped by four major historical-cultural events: Spanish colonization and forced African immigration caused by the slave trade during the Spanish domination (16th–18th centuries); the large wave of European immigration (1880–1950) and the large-scale internal migration (1930–1980).

Although strictly speaking "folklore" is only that cultural expression that meets the requirements of being anonymous, popular and traditional, in Argentina folklore or folkloric music is known as popular music of known authorship, inspired by rhythms and styles characteristic of provincial cultures, mostly of indigenous and Afro-Hispanic-colonial roots. Technically, the appropriate denomination is "music of folkloric projection of Argentina".

In Argentina, the music of folkloric projection began to acquire popularity in the 1930s and 1940s, coinciding with a large wave of internal migration from the countryside to the city and from the provinces to Buenos Aires, to establish itself in the 1950s, with the "folklore boom", as the main genre of national popular music, together with tango.

In the sixties and seventies, the popularity of Argentine "folklore" expanded and was linked to other similar expressions in Latin America, due to various movements of musical and lyrical renovation, and the appearance of great festivals of the genre, in particular the National Folklore Festival of Cosquín, one of the main festivals of the genre in Argentina.

After being affected by censorship and cultural repression during the National Reorganization Process, folkloric music regained visibility after the Malvinas War of 1982, although with expressions more related to other genres of Argentine and Latin American popular music, such as tango, the so-called "national rock", the Latin American romantic ballad, the cuarteto and the Colombian cumbia.

The historical evolution was shaping four large regions in folkloric music of Argentina: the Cordoba-Northwest, the Cuyo, the Littoral and the southern Pampa-Patagonian, at the same time influenced by, and influential in, the musical cultures of the bordering countries: Bolivia, Chile, Paraguay and Uruguay. Atahualpa Yupanqui is widely regarded as one of the central figures in the history of folkloric music in Argentina.

== Indigenous roots ==
Salvador Canals Frau, in his book Prehistoria de America, explains that music, together with song and dance, possibly appeared in America together with the first human beings who arrived in that continent. Among the first musical instruments found in South America are the primitive flute and the churinga, the latter of great diffusion in Australia and especially present in the Patagonian cultures, one of the similarities considered by the anthropologist Antonio Méndes Correia to sustain his hypothesis about the Australian origin of the American man and his entrance through the southern end of the continent.

In the current Argentine territory there were four great areas of indigenous cultures: the Central-Andean, the Mesopotamian-Littoral, the Chaco and the Pampa-Patagonian. The first two would fall under Spanish domination in the 16th century, but the second two would remain independent until the end of the 19th century. The Carlos Vega National Institute of Musicology has a collection of more than 400 indigenous and folkloric musical instruments, each one of them with its respective organological analysis, some of which can be seen in the Virtual Museum of Musical Instruments that it maintains on its website.

=== Central-Andean area ===
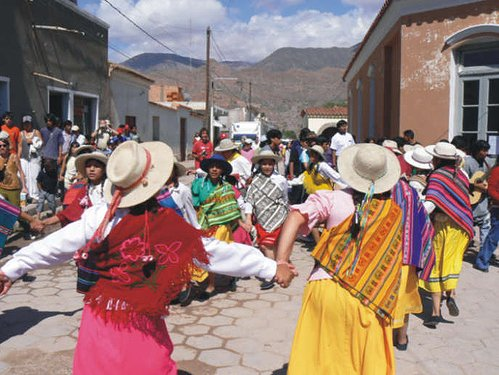
The carnavalito, a millenary Andean style of Argentine folklore.

The cultures of the Central-Andean area were characterized for having developed sedentary agro-ceramic civilizations. These cultures have had a strong influence on Argentine "Andean" folklore, both in terms of instruments, musical styles, aesthetic-musical lines, and even the language, mainly Quechua. Among the instruments, their influence has been decisive for the development of wind instruments, characteristic of Andean folklore, such as the siku, the quena, the pincullo, the erque, the ceramic ocarina, and so on, generally built on a pentatonic scale, as well as the caja, which plays a central role in the bagualero song.

Among the indigenous musical styles, contributed to the Argentine folklore, stands out the baguala, coming from the Diaguita-Calchaquí nation. Also the yaraví, antecedent of the vidala, and the huayno, come from the pre-Hispanic Andean civilization. The carnavalito jujeño, a pre-Hispanic dance of great folkloric importance, was already being danced in the northern zone when the Europeans arrived. The chaya, which would later characterize Riojan folklore, also comes from the Diaguita art dedicated to celebrating the harvest.

Leda Valladares, in particular, has highlighted the importance of singing with caja in Andean culture.

In Argentina, the singing with caja has three songs and multiple repertoires of them: baguala, tonada and vidala. Each one belongs to a different musical system... Cry in the sky (in Spanish: Grito en el cielo) takes us to the ancestral singing with a millenary technique of expression and powerful melodies. The sacred singers of the valleys, the "vallistos" that descend from the Andean centuries are waiting for us in the hills of northwestern Argentina to reveal another dimension of singing, terrestrial and sidereal. Listening to them, we land in America and discover it. Their speeches as singers is the supreme nudity: only three notes chilled by the voice of the abyss. This ray initiates us into the planetary chant that establishes the hierarchy of the scream and the lament as sacralities of the initiated.

— Leda Valladares.

=== Littoral area ===
In the littoral area, the Guaraní agro-ceramic culture stood out, which is the origin of many of the elements of today's folklore. Many of these elements disappeared with the Conquest, such as most of the musical instruments (congoera, tururu, mburé, mbaracá, guatapú mimby, among others).

During the Spanish colonization, the Guarani culture would evolve in a special way in the Jesuit missions, creating an autonomous musical culture, which would considerably influence the Argentinean littoral folklore.

=== Pampa-Patagonian area ===
Unlike the Central Andean and Mesopotamian-Litoral regions, Spain did not manage to conquer the indigenous communities living in the Chaco and Pampean-Patagonian regions, which were finally militarily subdued by the Argentine State between the end of the 19th and beginning of the 20th centuries. For this reason, in many cases, indigenous music in these areas is performed, even in the present, without fusions with music from other cultures present in Argentina.

Several cultures settled in the Pampa-Patagonian area, among them the oldest of those that lived in the current Argentine territory. Some of these peoples are: Tehuelche, Pehuenche, Mapuche, Ranquel, Yahgan, Selkʼnam, and so on. Of all of them, the Mapuche culture managed to dominate a large part of the region, from the 17th century onwards, influencing the Patagonian and Pampean cultures, with the exception of those of Tierra del Fuego.

Mapuche music is still played as it was before the so-called Conquest of the Desert (1876–1880), the war through which Argentina conquered the Pampa-Patagonian territories. It is characterized by a strong sacred component, characterized by an a cappella singing, and the use of musical instruments of their own invention, such as the cultrun, the trutruca, the torompe, the cascahuilla and the pifilca. Among the musical styles of Mapuche origin, the loncomeo stands out, which includes a group dance to the sound of cajas and horns.

Among the testimonies of Patagonian indigenous music, the recordings of Selkʼnam (Ona) and Yaghan songs made by Charles Wellington in 1907 and 1908 stand out. Also of great value are the songs performed by Lola Kiepja, known as "the last Selkʼnam", compiled by Anne Chapman in two records produced by the Musée de l'Homme in Paris, under the title Selkʼnam chants of Tierra del Fuego, Argentina (in Spanish: Cantos selkʼnam de Tierra del Fuego, Argentina), some of which can be heard on the Internet.

=== Chaco area ===
Cultures such as the Guaycurú (Abipon, Mbayá, Payaguá, Mocoví, Wichí and Pilagá), the Qom and the Avá Guaraní settled in the Chaco area. Like the Pampan-Patagonian cultures, they had in common the fact that they resisted the Spanish conquest and prevented colonization.

The indigenous people of Chaco used —and still use— a great variety of musical instruments, such as the novike or n'vike, the cataqui or water drum, the yelatáj chos woley (musical bows), the guimbarda or trompl, the rattles of nails and gourd, the coioc, the naseré, the sereré and the Chaco flutes.

The music of the Chaco cultures tends to the interaction of the musician with the natural sounds. Instruments such as the naseré, the sereré and the coioc, simulate the song of the birds and provoke the response of these, which are integrated in this way to the musical experience. One of the main instruments of these cultures, the nobique or n'vike, a one-stringed instrument similar to the lute, has inspired a musical legend, which attributes to the instrument the origin of the Morning star (Venus).

Among the ancestral songs that have been preserved is Yo 'Ogoñí ('the dawn'), a Qom chant that was performed daily to sing to the rising of the sun.

Among the groups and artists that perform Chaco indigenous music is the Toba Chelaalapi Choir, some of whose performances can be heard on the Internet.

== African roots ==
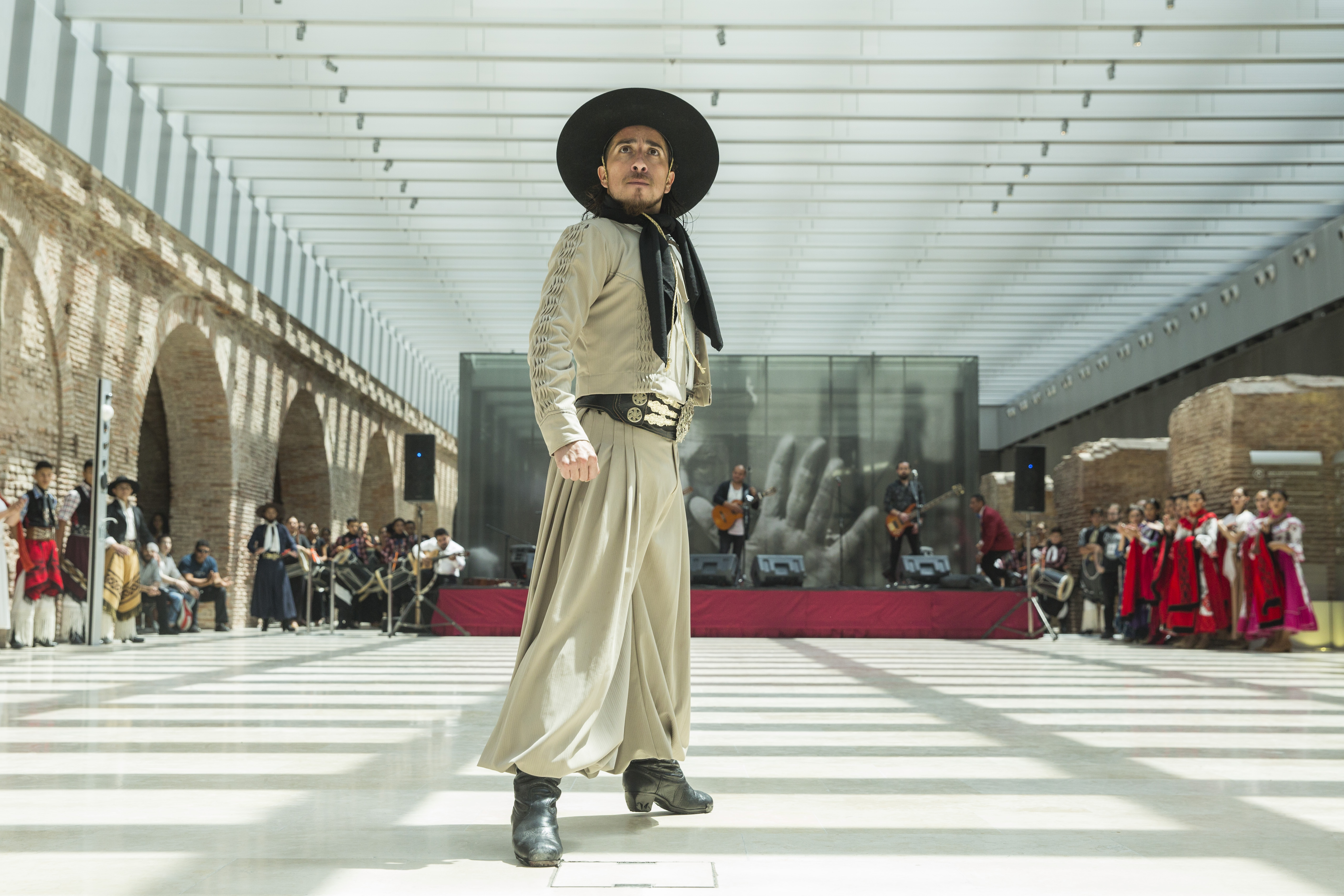
Malambo soloist.

The Africans brought as slaves to Argentina during the colonial period, and their descendants born in the territory that is now Argentina (Afro-Argentines), contributed to the construction of the Argentine Nation and its culture. Music is not an exception, and within this, the folkloric music.

Candombe was folklore until shortly after the fall of Rosas. It is still played in the present, in several of its versions (Afro-Porteño, Afro-Correntino, and so on); among them stands out the candombe porteño. Other Afro-Argentinean rhythms are also preserved, such as the zemba or charanda, a rhythm associated with the cult of San Baltasar in the Northeast of Argentina, especially in Corrientes and Chaco.

As for the Argentine folklore, recognized as such from years ago until today, has African and Afro-Argentine influences, the following are the most prominent: the chacarera, the payada, the milonga campera, the malambo, and -perhaps- the gato. The tango and the milonga ciudadana also have African influences. In the latter, the Afro-Argentines influenced, above all, in its dance. Also the murga porteña has several elements received from the Afro-Porteños and their candombe; so that when these rhythms were fused with other non-African rhythms, the Argentine murga was born.

While the exact origin of the chacarera is still little known, it is believed -and some claim- that it originated in Salavina (Province of Santiago del Estero). This dance has a clear African influence noted in the agile rhythm, especially in the playing of the bombo legüero. This could be understood, if we take into account the large number of Afro-Afro-Santiagueños that existed in the 18th and 19th centuries in Santiago del Estero; and knowing that almost 70% of the population of Salavina at the middle and end of the 19th century (the time when the chacarera was developed) was Afro-Argentine. Also, the historian Juan Álvarez, through the comparative melorhythmic principle of the Berlin school, established (more than possible) afro affiliations in musical styles such as tango, milonga bonaerense, caramba and marote.

In this way, the chacarera would have large African contributions, as would the malambo (which is seen in the lively zapateo, sharing African roots with the small Afro-Peruvian zapateos), the tango, the payada, the gato (a rhythm that greatly influenced the chacarera), the Pampean milonga campera and the milonga ciudadana dance.

== Colonial roots ==
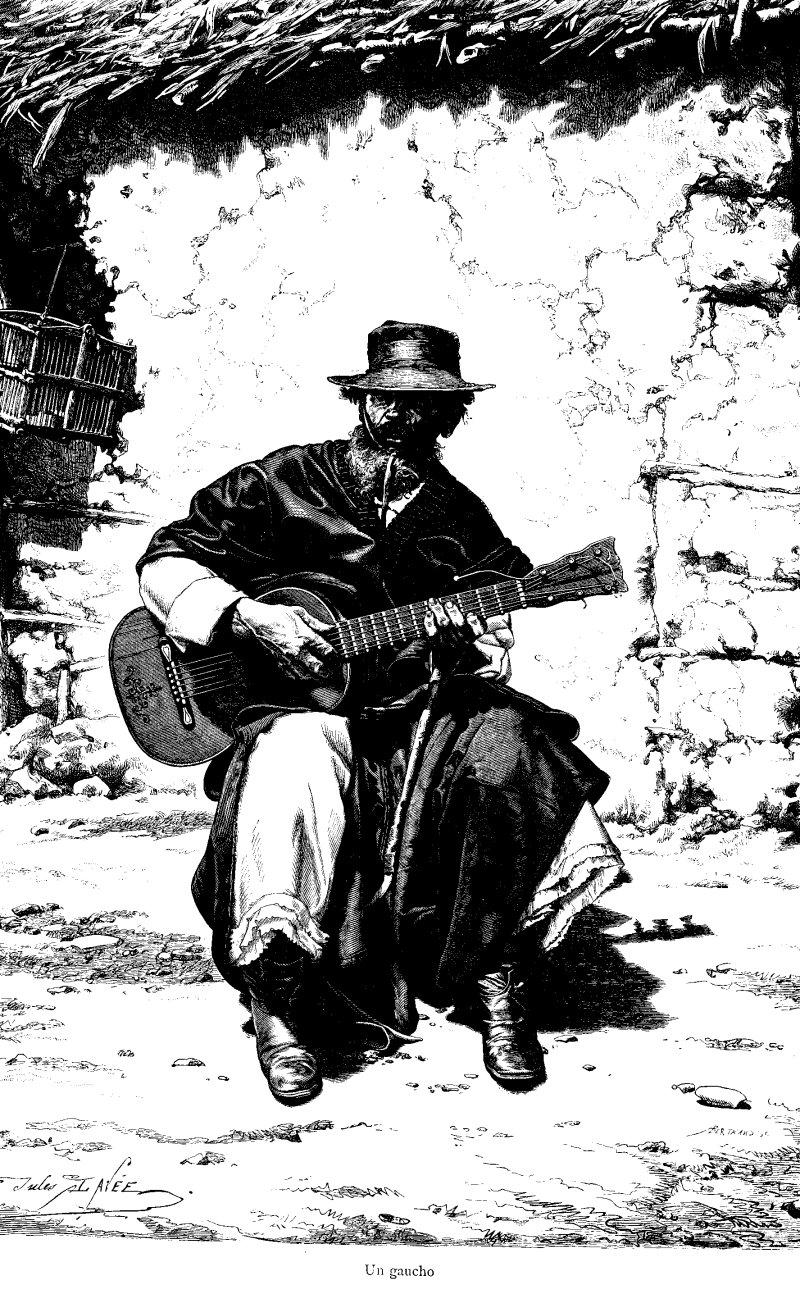
Spanish colonization and biological and cultural miscegenation led to the creation of new forms of popular music, such as the payada, the preferred style of the gaucho.

Spanish colonization brought the aesthetic criteria, techniques and instruments characteristic of European music. The biological and cultural miscegenation that characterized the colony led to the development of its own dances, instruments and musical techniques (mestizo or criollo), which would have a decisive influence on Argentine folklore.

Among the most important European contributions were the vihuela or "Creole guitar" and the bombo legüero, and a new instrument, the charango, a European guitar similar to the tiple of the Canary Islands, made from the shell of an armadillo, of great importance for Andean northern folklore.

Among the oldest colonial folkloric rhythms are the vidala and the vidalita, songs of deep pre-Hispanic indigenous influence, originally sacred and of cosmic projection, derived from the pre-Hispanic baguala and yaraví, accompanied by the Andean caja or bombo.

In the Jesuit missions, the Guaraní developed a unique style of music, based on the chordophone (harp) and a kind of precursor of the accordion. The Guaraní missions made all kinds of instruments: organs, harps, violins, trumpets, cornets, clavichords, chirimías, bassoons and flutes. This is where the traditional chamamé appears.

In the Archivo de Indias, in Spain, there is documentation that proves that this music already existed when the Jesuit missions arrived in Yapeyú. The Jesuits settled in that area the largest manufacture of musical instruments of the Río de la Plata and it is believed that the accordion came with them, to replace the organ in the liturgy. It is certain that the chamamé was well suited for the diatonic scale and so it was incorporated. In the time of the colony the ladies of the society learned to dance it with Indian masters.

— Antonio Tarragó Ros.

In the south of the Spanish colony in the Río de La Plata, on the border with the indigenous territory, a gaucho music developed, of an individual nature, with a leading presence of the Creole guitar and soloist singing. Among the dances, the malambo, a masculine zapateo, originated at the beginning of the 17th century, stands out. Of great importance were the payadas, guitar and singing duels between gauchos.

Also in the area of the Río de la Plata, at the end of the 18th century, the candombe appeared, a musical style and dance created by slaves of African origin, based on tamboril rhythms.

== Independence and civil wars ==
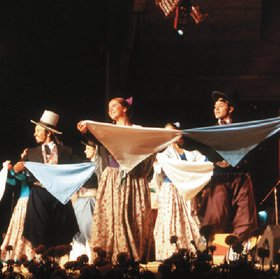
The pericón: the Independence opened a period of creation of its own musical styles.

Independence from Spain had very important consequences for the development of Argentine folkloric music, as in other Latin American countries. In the years immediately following the May Revolution of 1810, leading to the independence process, many of the characteristic dances and styles of Argentine folklore appear, such as the cielito, the pericón, the gato, the cuándo, the escondido, the triunfo. In general, these are lively and picaresque styles, of popular roots, which contrasted with the salon styles preferred by the Spanish colonial culture.

"El cielito was the great popular song of the Independence. Attracted by the revolution, it came from the pampas of Buenos Aires, ascended to the podiums, joined the armies and spread throughout South America with its fiery rural scream". Among the patriotic cielitos, stand out very clearly those composed by the oriental Bartolomé Hidalgo, founder of the gaucho literature. One of them reads:

Cielito, cielo que sí
Americanos unión,
Y díganle al rey Fernando
Que mande otra expedición.

The pericón acquired the character of a patriotic dance, both in Argentina and in Paraguay and Uruguay —which initially had remained united—. It was also taken to Chile by José de San Martín in 1817. In 1887, the Uruguayan musician Gerardo Grasso composed the Pericón nacional, a song that is still danced in both countries.

The triumph appeared as a dance to celebrate, precisely, the triumph of independence. One of the oldest lyrics reads:

This is the triumph, child
of the patriots,
the royalists fled
like seagulls. Este es el triunfo, niña
de los patriotas,
huían los realistas
como gaviotas.

The wars of Independence and civil wars also boosted the growth of the vidalitas, rescued by "las cholas tucumanas" for the singing of the soldiers in campaign, due to its content " excluding of sorrows and loaded with jokes, opposing to the laments of the vidala". From this current arose the vidalitas of the civil wars between Unitarians and Federals, such as the famous Vidalita de Lamadrid:

Unitarian dogs,
Vidalitá,
They have respected nothing.
To filthy Frenchmen
Vidalitá,
They have allied themselves. Perros unitarios,
Vidalitá,
Nada han respetado.
A inmundos franceses
Vidalitá,
Ellos se han aliado.

The Unitarian side has also handed down a historical vidalita:

Palomita blanca,
Vidalitá,
That you cross the valley,
Go tell everyone,
Vidalitá,
That Lavalle is dead. Palomita blanca,
Vidalitá,
Que cruzas el valle,
Ve a decirle a todos,
Vidalitá,
Que ha muerto Lavalle.

Among all the styles that emerged in this period, it was the gato that achieved the greatest popularity and became the favorite of the gaucho culture. The gato, a lively and picaresque style, introduced in the 1830s, also the relaciones, a type of humorous couplets that the dancers recite when the music stops, which were also performed in the cielito, the pericón and the aires. In the following decades the relaciones would be combined with the "aro-aro", characteristic of the cueca, a shout uttered by those attending the dance or by the musicians, with the virtue of instantly suspending the music, to give way to a moment of toast or humorous relations. This custom of combining humor and music would pass in the second half of the 19th century to the chacarera and the chamamé.

From this period came a legendary character, Santos Vega, who is the first famous popular musician of Argentine folklore. According to legend, Santos Vega was such an extraordinary payador that he dared to payar with the devil, after which he disappeared forever, never to be heard from again.

== European immigration: Tango and Folklore ==
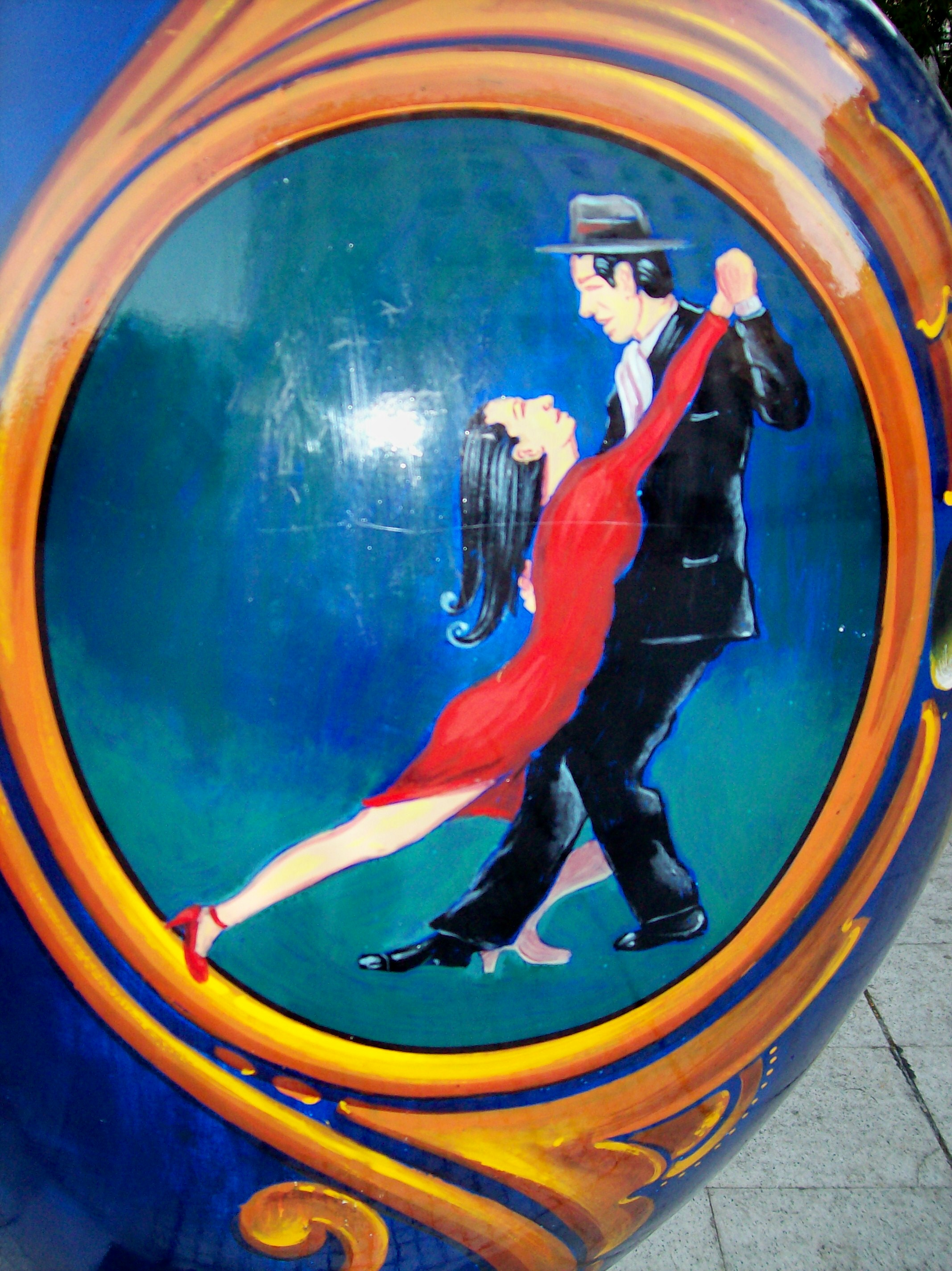
In the second half of the 19th century, tango appeared. Since then, Argentine popular music has been characterized by the duality tango (city)-folklore (countryside).

The great wave of immigration between 1880 and 1950, mainly European, would influence Argentine popular music.

Since then, tango and folklore appeared as different and even conflicting forms of Argentine popular music: tango as "city music", while folklore was identified with rural music. For several decades tango was considered the popular music of Argentina, relegating folklore, which remained isolated in the local spheres of each region.

Prior to this period, some fundamental genres of Argentine folklore appeared, such as the chacarera, the zamba, the milonga campera or simply milonga (decades before the milonga ciudadana) and the arunguita.

The chacarera seems to have been born in the middle of the 19th century, in Santiago del Estero (it is said that in Salavina), but its historical origin is unknown. In the Chacarera there is a noticeable Afro influence, especially in its rhythm, due to the population of Afro-Santiagueños in the 18th and 19th centuries. The first known chacarera sheet music was written by Andrés Chazarreta in 1911.

By the end of the 1860s, the Argentine zamba appears, the Argentine national style par excellence, differentiating it from the Afro-Peruvian zamacueca, of which it derives, having entered from Bolivia between 1825 and 1830. The Zamba de Vargas is the oldest of which there are records and was possibly the first to appear with the characteristics of the Argentine zamba. It is worth mentioning that the cueca has almost the same rhythm as the zamba, although with a faster tempo, so they are different genres.

In the west, from Chile, cueca entered Cuyo and La Rioja, becoming Riojan cueca (in Spanish: cueca riojana). The northern cueca (or just Chilean cueca) was established in Jujuy, expanding to Salta and Tucumán at the end of the 19th century. Although it is known in the Argentine Northwest as musical Chilean, choreographically it differs from the Chilean cueca, since it is an older version of the cueca that entered Argentina from Peru through Bolivia. In general, the name Chilean is reserved for bimodal cuecas.

In the second half of the 19th century, chamamé appeared in the Northeast (it acquired this name in the 1930s), as a result of the fusion of the music of German, Polish, Ukrainian and Jewish immigrants (mainly polka and shottis) with the rhythms of the indigenous Guaraní culture and Afro-Rioplatense traditions. The chamamé and the purajhei or Paraguayan polka, would be the axis around which the littoral music would be structured, as one of the great branches of the Argentinean folk music. Like the tango, the littoral dances adopted a choreography of a linked couple with freedom for the dancers, which were performed in popular bailantas. From then on, the term "bailanta" would spread throughout the country to designate popular dances.

Famous payadores such as the Afro-Argentinean Buenos Aires native Gabino Ezeiza or the Santiago del Estero native José Enrique Ordóñez (el Zunko Viejo) belong to the last decades of the 19th century. Around the same time, the Creole circus —appeared in the 1840s—, besides creating the national theater, used to include folkloric dance numbers.

== Resurgence of folklore ==
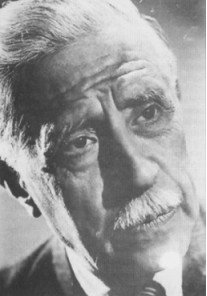
Andrés Chazarreta initiated the resurgence of Argentine folklore with his historic performances in 1906 in Santiago del Estero, interpreting the Zamba de Vargas, compiled by himself, and in 1921 at the Politeama Theater in Buenos Aires, with his Native Art Company (in Spanish: Compañía de Arte Nativo).

Since the end of the 19th century, an effort to recover folklore as national music had already begun, driven by compilers such as Ernesto Padilla, Andrés Chazarreta and Juan Alfonso Carrizo, or composer-singers such as Saúl Salinas, father of the "tonada cuyana". Folkloric music began to spread in the north of the country and by the 1920s it was ready to be projected nationally.

The national resurgence of folklore took place in stages. On August 25, 1906 Andrés Chazarreta gave a historic guitar recital at the Teatro Cervantes in Santiago del Estero that began with a performance of the Zamba de Vargas, an anonymous folk song, probably the first to take the form of an Argentine zamba, which has been attributed to have been played during the tragic Battle of Pozo de Vargas in 1867 causing the victory of Santiago del Estero, and which Chazarreta himself compiled from his family environment. At that time it was called "native music" —the term "folklore" and "folkloric music" to refer to popular music inspired by rhythms belonging to folklore would appear in the 50s —and Chazarreta himself formed his Compañía de Arte Nativo del Norte Argentino, which debuted on June 19, 1911 and with he would tour the country.

By then, Buenos Aires became the center of the massive diffusion of Argentine music, due to the vitality of its show business, for being the headquarters of the record companies (the first Argentine gramophone records were recorded in 1902) and the headquarters of the main radio stations (Buenos Aires was the city where the first radio broadcast in history took place, on August 27, 1920).

Although in the years of the 1910s the Gardel-Razzano duo —who came from the world of payada and milonga campera— integrated their repertoire almost exclusively with folkloric songs (El sol del 25, El moro, El pangaré), it is considered that the key moment of the resurgence of Argentine folklore was the historical performance that Andrés Chazarreta made in Buenos Aires on March 16, 1921 at the Politeama theater, where with great success he presented his compilations of popular songs such as the Zamba de Vargas, La López Pereyra (composed by Artidorio Cresseri in 1901), La Telesita, among others. In 1925 he recorded for the Elektra label his first single, with La 7 de abril and Santiago del Estero.

From the mid-1930s onwards, the wave of immigration from overseas began to decline, while a great wave of internal migration was generated, from the countryside to the city and from the provinces (the "interior") to Buenos Aires. This last process brought folklore to Buenos Aires, especially, and prepared the conditions for what would be called the "folklore boom" in the 50s and 60s.

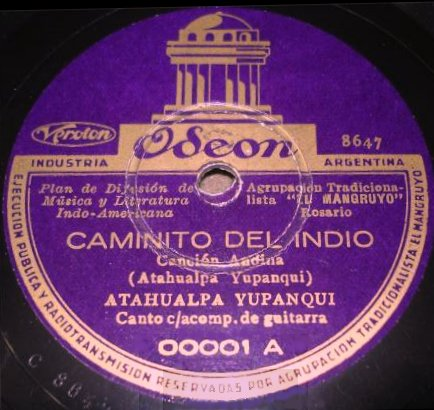
Atahualpa Yupanqui's first album: Camino del indio, 1936. Yupanqui would only reach popular recognition in the 1960s.

The scarce importance given to folkloric music is evidenced in a note published by the magazine Sintonía in 1935, entitled "Indigenous Recital by Radio Fénix" (in Spanish: Recital indígena por Radio Fénix), reporting the presentation of a young singer, Atahualpa Yupanqui:

"Pleasant artistic note and not very frequent is the one offered by the interpreter Atahualpa Tupanqui [sic, for Yupanqui] on the Fénix radio station. The indigenous music has not had a full manifestation here until the magnificent pianist Argentino Valle revealed it in emotive interpretations. A. Tupanqui's [sic] performance can only be praised and it is to be hoped that the artist will reaffirm the journalistic commentary with an outstanding performance."

On October 1, 1937 the San Juan-born Buenaventura Luna (Sentencias del Tata Viejo) and his group La Tropilla de Huachi Pampa (Entre San Juan y Mendoza), which included the Tormo-Canales Duo (Antonio Tormo and Diego Canales) made their debut on Radio El Mundo of Buenos Aires, paving the way for the mass broadcasting of folkloric music; the success led the radio station to air in 1939 the folkloric program The Muleteers' Fireside (in Spanish: El fogón de los arrieros).

In the 1940s, the national success of the Santiago del Estero group Los Hermanos Ábalos (Nostalgias santiagueñas, De mis pagos, Chacarera del rancho), emerged in 1939, and the appearance of a generation of classical musicians, who would use in their compositions the musical styles of Argentine folklore, especially Carlos Guastavino and Alberto Ginastera. In this decade, folkloric duos also became widespread, such as the aforementioned Tormo-Canales Duo, and others like the Benítez-Pacheco Duo, the Hermanos Cáceres Duo, the Vera-Molina Duo from Tucuman, and groups like the successful Llajta Sumac, led by the Riojan duo Velárdez-Vergara.

In 1942, Los Hermanos Ábalos achieved nationwide fame when they appeared performing their Carnavalito in the film La Guerra Gaucha, directed by Lucas Demare, with a script by the tango singer Homero Manzi —of Santiago del Estero origin— and Ulyses Petit de Murat.

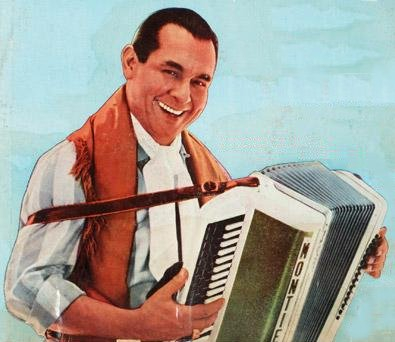
Ernesto Montiel, the "Lord of the Accordion", founder of the legendary Cuarteto Santa Ana in 1942, the first littoral music group to achieve massive success.

Emilio Chamorro and Osvaldo Sosa Cordero (Anahí, Naranjerita) distinguished themselves as precursors of the littoral music, with performances in Buenos Aires since the 1920s. Tata Chamorro founded the group Los Hijos de Corrientes in 1931, defined as "chamamecera school", recorded records for RCA Victor since 1935, and appeared in films such as Cándida (1939), Prisoners of the Earth (1939) and Three men in the river (1943). Sosa Cordero succeeded in having his song Anahí incorporated into the school repertoire throughout the country in 1943 and recorded records since 1942 for the Odeon label, with the ensemble Osvaldo Sosa Cordero y sus Correntinos. In 1942, Ernesto Montiel and Isaco Abitbol founded the legendary Cuarteto Santa Ana, which was the first to achieve massive success. In the forties, the chamamamé Merceditas, interpreted by its author, Ramón Sixto Ríos, would become a success; over the years it would become, together with Zamba de mi esperanza, the most popular song in the history of Argentine folklore.

The resurgence of folklore was also manifested in classical music, with the appearance of composers who began to incorporate rhythms and tonalities of native origin in their works. Two of them, Carlos Guastavino and Alberto Ginastera, expressed two major musical trends in folklore: the former finding in folkloric rhythms a way to a more direct relationship with the general public; the latter seeking in folkloric rhythms inspiration to experiment with new musical forms.

Carlos Guastavino, since the late thirties, developed a remarkable work based on musical nationalism, intimately linking classical music and folk music. His works include Arroyito serrano (1939), La rosa y el sauce (1942), the ballet Fue una vez (premiered at the Teatro Colón in 1942), Suite Argentina (1942), Tres romances argentinos (premiered by the BBC Symphony Orchestra in 1949), among others. For Suite Argentina, Guastavino also composed the music for a classic song of the Spanish-American repertoire, Se equivocó la paloma, composed in 1941 with lyrics by the Spanish poet Rafael Alberti, then exiled in Argentina.

Alberto Ginastera, with a slightly less popular style, composed in the same period works of folkloric inspiration, such as Danzas Argentinas op. 2 for piano, Cinco Canciones Populares Argentinas, Las horas de una estancia, Pampeana nº 1 (1947) and Ollantay (1947). But it was especially the premiere of the orchestral suite of his ballet Estancia, in 1941, which enshrined the musician.

In 1948 the single Amémonos (RCA Victor), interpreted by Antonio Tormo, sold one million records, even surpassing in sales the tango records of Carlos Gardel, at that time the undisputed leader of Argentine popular music. The success was indicative of the growing popularity of Argentine folkloric music and anticipated the folklore boom that would follow soon after. In 1949, Buenaventura Luna put on the air on Radio Belgrano a program called El canto perdido, with the aim of making a "barbarian anthology" of the "lost songs in the Argentine traditions", with interpretations of the group Los Manseros de Tulum. By vindicating "the barbarian", Luna opposed the duality "civilization or barbarism" established by Domingo Faustino Sarmiento, accepted as a basic principle of the official Argentine culture, including in the notion of "barbarism" the folkloric culture of Afro-Hispanic-indigenous origin, and paradigmatically the gaucho culture.

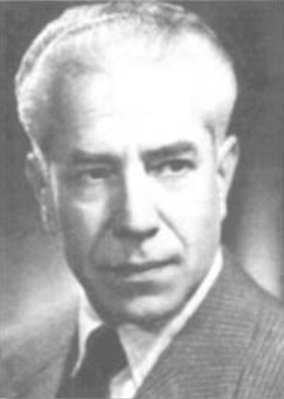
Carlos Vega (1898–1966). In the 1930s he laid the foundations of the National Institute of Musicology that bears his name and initiated studies on folkloric music and dance in Argentina.

Simultaneously, in a radio report, Buenaventura Luna highlighted the socio-cultural substratum that was driving the increasing popularity of folkloric roots music:

"A form of civilization can and does collapse, but culture does not. In the long run, men feel the need to look for themselves in the national, in their songs and in their coplas. This is what is happening in Buenos Aires. The provincial people have stopped being shameful provincial people and have been encouraged to sing the songs of their homeland in all the points of the great capital. Disenchantment has been reached in the face of the foreign, that overwhelmed. And how it overwhelmed...! We have reached the true nationalism, without bands or badges, which has been dreamed of since the time of the Organization."

— Buenaventura Luna.

Finally, the resurgence of folkloric music was also manifested in the appearance of studies and research on the subject, among them the work of researchers such as Carlos Vega, Isabel Aretz (1909–2005) and Augusto Raúl Cortázar (1910–1974). Carlos Vega (1898–1966) created in 1931 the Cabinet of Indigenous Musicology (in Spanish: Gabinete de Musicología Indígena) in the Argentine Museum of Natural Sciences of Buenos Aires, which would be organized as an autonomous entity in 1948 under the name of Institute of Musicology, that would bear his name from 1963 onwards. Vega identified and analyzed the native instruments and folkloric rhythms and dances of Argentina, disseminating his findings in fundamental works, such as Danzas y canciones argentinas (1936), the series Bailes tradicionales argentinos (1940s), La música popular argentina (1944), Música sudamericana (1946), Los instrumentos musicales aborígenes y criollos de Argentina (1946), Las canciones folklóricas argentinas (1963), among others.

== Boom of folklore ==
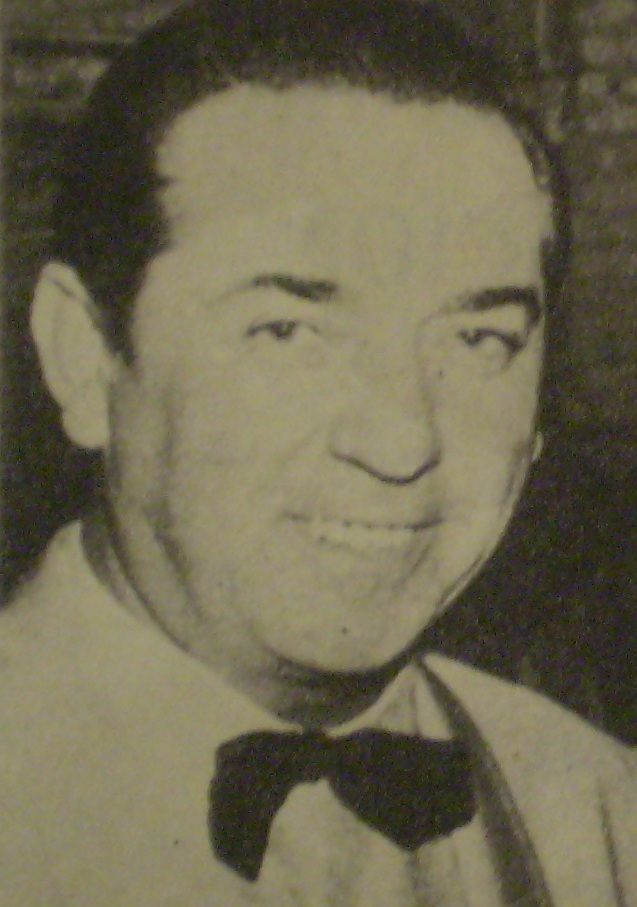
Antonio Tormo released in 1950 the song El rancho 'e la Cambicha, which sold 5 million units, an amount never surpassed. This was the beginning of the "folklore boom" in Argentina.

In the fifties, the so-called "folklore boom" took place, a phenomenon of massive diffusion and appreciation of popular music with folkloric roots, due to multiple causes:

- The massive migration, since the 1930s, to Buenos Aires of workers coming from the so-called "interior" of the country, of different cultural and ethnic extraction from the European immigrants —mainly Italian— who had arrived up to that moment, during seven decades, and who were more linked to tango;
- The expansion of mass media such as radio, cinema and records, and the appearance of television;
- The process of industrialisation and urbanization;
- The improvement of the living conditions of a large salaried class and a broad middle class, and the emergence of a consumer society.

In 1949, President Juan Domingo Perón issued Decree 3371/1949 for the Protection of National Music, stipulating that bars and public places had to play at least 50% of native music, a rule consolidated in 1953 with Law No. 14.226, better known as the Live Number Law (in Spanish: Ley del Número Vivo), which ordered the inclusion of live artists in cinematographic performances. The measures promoted an explosion of artists and folkloric groups.

In 1950, the singer from Mendoza Antonio Tormo released, on a 78 rpm single record, the song "El rancho 'e la Cambicha", by Mario Millán Medina, the driving force behind the double rasguido. It sold 5 million records, a record never surpassed in Argentina, an amount that practically implied that every home with a record player had bought a copy. In fact, in that 1950, tango was for the first time overtaken in sales by a popular song from folklore. (Note: Extracted from the book ''Horacio Salgán: la supervivencia de un artista en el tiempo''. Ediciones Corregidor, 1992. Ursini, Sonia. "Horacio Salgán". Archived from the original on October 29, 2013.)

Tormo, called "the singer of the cabecitas negras" and recognized as the "inventor of mass folklore", would be banned by the dictatorship called Revolución Libertadora that overthrew President Perón in 1955.

"I became the spokesman of the cabecita; of the provincial boy who came to Buenos Aires to work."

— Antonio Tormo (2002)

That same year Polo Giménez became famous when he premiered his zamba "Paisaje de Catamarca", recorded as a single and album by Carlos Montbrun Ocampo's group (Nendivei) —in which Giménez played the piano—, and broadcast in his popular program Las Alegres Fiestas Gauchas on Radio Splendid. Polo Giménez himself, in his book De este lado del recuerdo, relates that moment as follows:

"Still the word "folklore" was a bit taboo, because it was synonymous with wine, farras, drunkenness of low class people."

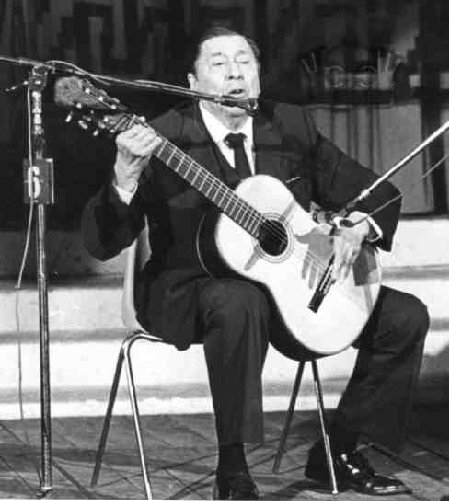
Atahualpa Yupanqui, persecuted in Argentina, achieves success in Paris by performing with Édith Piaf on July 7, 1950.

At the same time, Héctor Roberto Chavero from Pergamino, better known as Atahualpa Yupanqui ("Camino del indio", "El arriero", "Luna tucumana", "Criollita santiagueña", "Duerme negrito", "Viene clareando", "Los ejes de mi carreta", "Los ejes de mi carreta", "Duerme negrito", "Duerme negrito", "Viene clareando", "El arriero", "Luna tucumana", "Los ejes de mi carreta"), who was persecuted and marginalized in Argentina "for being a communist and a guitar player", settled in France, where he achieved a resounding success when he sang with Édith Piaf on July 7, 1950. As a result, the following year he would record three single albums for the French record label Le Chant du Monde, in which "Baguala de los minores" (sic, for miners) stood out, later renamed "Soy minero" (I am a miner), a precursor of the Latin American protest song, which would be extended in the following two decades. From the 1960s onwards, "don Ata", as he was affectionately called, will be recognized as the greatest exponent of Argentine folkloric music of all times. A chacarera with lyrics by the poet Miguel Ángel Morelli and music by Mario Álvarez Quiroga, called precisely "A don Ata", summarizes his work and concludes with the following refrain:

There goes don Atahualpa through the roads of the world,
With a copla for a spear marking the four courses.
May God bless him, have him in glory
For so many beautiful memories and for his memory. Ahí anda don Atahualpa por los caminos del mundo,
Con una copla por lanza marcando los cuatro rumbos.
Que Dios lo bendiga, lo tenga en la gloria
por tanto recuerdos lindos y por su memoria.

— "To Don Ata", Miguel Angel Morelli

Since the late 1940's prominent authors stood out such as Hilario Cuadros, Juan Gualberto Godoy, Eduardo Troncozo from Cuyo, Ariel Ramírez from Santa Fe, Armando Tejada Gómez, Hamlet Lima Quintana (author of the lyrics of several famous zambas).

In 1956, three fundamental quartets of Argentine folk music released their first albums: Éxitos de Los Chalchaleros Vol 1, Los Cantores de Quilla Huasi, and Canciones de cerro y luna by Los Fronterizos. In 1957 Jorge Cafrune and Tomás Tutú Campos among others form Las Voces de Huayra.

Los Chalchaleros, who had made their debut in 1948 in Salta, not only incorporated many new songs to the popular folkloric songbook ("Lloraré", "Zamba del grillo", "Sapo cancionero", among others), but also imposed a musical style, based on a new model of basic folkloric group: four members, with two baritones, a tenor and a bass, playing three guitars and a bass drum.

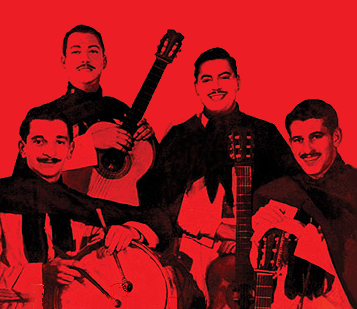

In 1956, Los Chalchaleros released their first album, Éxitos de Los Chalchaleros (volume 1). They established the three-guitar and bass drum quartet as a new type of folk music ensemble, inspiring the creation of a large number of groups with a similar structure.

Los Chalchaleros established themselves as one of the main classic groups of Argentine folklore, together with Los Fronterizos ("El quiaqueño", "Zamba de Anta", "La López Pereyra"), Los Cantores del Alba ("La Felipe Varela", "Tonada del viejo amor", "Anocheciendo zambas", "Carpas de Salta"), Los Andariegos ("El cóndor vuelve"), Los de Salta ("Flor de lino", "La compañera"), Los Cantores de Quilla Huasi ("Zamba de la toldería"), Los Tucu Tucu ("Zamba de amor y mar", "Candombe para José"), Los Nocheros de Anta ("Zamba para no morir", "Canción de lejos"), among many others.

The folklore boom also allowed the massive diffusion of musicians and singers that in many cases had already been performing in the native music scene for several years before, such as the virtuous guitarists Abel Fleury ("Estilo pampeano") and Eduardo Falú ("Zamba de la Candelaria", "La nochera"), singer Margarita Palacios ("Recuerdo de mis valles"), bandoneon player Payo Solá ("La marrupeña"), violinist Sixto Palavecino ("La ñaupa ñaupa"), Rodolfo Polo Giménez ("Paisaje de Catamarca", "Del tiempo i'mama"), Atuto Mercau Soria and Ariel Ramírez, among many others. The latter would record with Los Fronterizos in 1964 one of the culminating works of Argentine music, the Misa Criolla.

In 1965, Tomás Tutú Campos, undoubtedly one of the incomparable voices of folklore, founder of two of the most splendid groups of the time, Las Voces de Huayra with Jorge Cafrune among others, and Los Cantores del Alba. Tutú was replaced in Los Cantores del Alba by Santiago Gregorio Escobar and decided to pursue a career as a soloist where he recorded with the orchestra of Waldo de los Ríos and also with guitars of Remberto Narváez and Luis Amaya among others, performing songs such as "Guitarra trasnochada", "Noches isleñas", "El cocherito", "Llorando estoy" and so on.

In the littoral music of this period, musicians who had been performing since the 1940s achieved success, such as Tránsito Cocomarola ("Puente Pexoa", "Kilómetro 11") —in whose homage Chamamé Day is celebrated— and Tarragó Ros ("La guampada" and "A Curuzú") —known as the King of Chamamé—, and new figures were also added to that list, such as the remarkable voice of Ramona Galarza ("Merceditas", "Pescador y guitarrero", "Virgencita de Caacupé", "Trasnochados espineles") —called the Bride of Paraná—. In Entre Ríos, Linares Cardozo performed a remarkable work of preservation of Entre Ríos folklore, especially the chamarrita, besides contributing his own works to the folk songbook, such as the well-known "Canción de cuna costera" and "Soy entrerriano", considered the anthem of the province.

== Dynamic folklore, Nuevo Cancionero, MPA ==
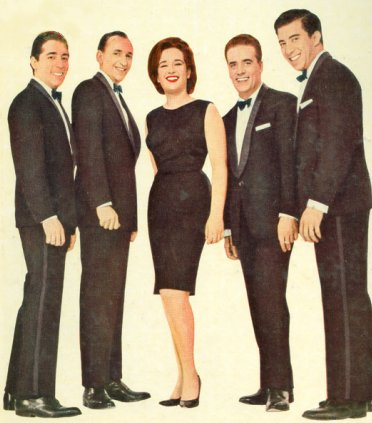
Los Huanca Hua, founded in 1960, renewed the ways of interpreting folklore. In the picture, the 1963 line-up: Chango Farías Gómez, Carlos Coco del Franco Terrero, Marián Farías Gómez (replacing Hernán Figueroa Reyes), Guillermo Urien and Pedro Farías Gómez.

In the 1960s, the folklore boom would be amplified with the launching of large folkloric music festivals such as the Cosquín Festival (1961) and the Festival de Jesús María (1966), but above all with the appearance and massive diffusion of renovating musical forms, in a process of continental range, adopted denominations such as "new Latin American song", "folkloric projection" and "dynamic folklore" or acronyms such as MPA (Música Popular Argentina, Argentine Popular Music), with its equivalents in other South American countries such as Brazil (MPB) and Uruguay (MPU).

In 1968, the music critic Miguel Smirnoff, when presenting the album of the Cuarteto Vocal Zupay published under the suggestive title of Folklore sin mirar atrás Vol. 2, stated the following:

It is probable that very few times in the world —the Brazilian case is one of the exceptions— has the national music of a country advanced, in depth and richness, as much as the Argentinean in recent years. [It is] the creation of "that" which, perhaps, is a faithful expression of our country in the world: Argentine Popular Music, thus, with capital letters, integrating the elements of tango and folklore to a rhythmic and melodic base of universal value and easy comprehension anywhere.

In 1960, Chango Farías Gómez formed Los Huanca Huá, a vocal group that, through the introduction of complex polyphonic arrangements, would profoundly renew folkloric music in Argentina and Latin America. Los Huanca Hua, in its initial formation, was also integrated by Pedro Farías Gómez —who would assume the leadership since 1966—, Hernán Figueroa Reyes —replaced shortly after by the remarkable singer Marián Farías Gómez—, Carlos del Franco Terrero and Guillermo Urien.

Choral folklore already had antecedents such as the surprising precursor experience of the Cuarteto Gómez Carrillo in the 1940s and 1950s, or the ensemble Llajta Sumac, Los Andariegos, the Cuarteto Contemporáneo, the Conjunto Universitario "Achalay" of La Plata, and Los Trovadores del Norte (Puente Pexoa), already in the 1950s. But it would be the success of Los Huanca Hua that would impulse the formation of vocal groups in Argentina. Up to that moment, most of the groups worked with two voices, exceptionally with three voices. Vocal groups —intimately related to a less visible but far-reaching process of choir development— began to introduce fourth and fifth voices, counterpoint, contracantos and in general to explore the musical tools of polyphony and old musical forms designed for singing, such as the madrigal, the cantata, the motet, among others.

Following the innovative possibilities for folkloric and popular music opened up by vocal arrangements, several vocal groups were created, such as the Grupo Vocal Argentino, the Cuarteto Zupay (Marcha de San Lorenzo), Los Trovadores (Platerito), Quinteto Tiempo, Opus Cuatro (A la mina no voy), Contracanto, Markama (Zamba landó), Huerque Mapu, Buenos Aires 8, Quinteto Santa Fe, Cantoral, Anacrusa, Santaires, De los Pueblos, Intimayu, and others. The movement spread to other countries of the region, mainly to Chile where, almost simultaneously to the Argentinean case, the Neofolkloric movement exploded, with groups such as Los Cuatro Cuartos, Las Cuatro Brujas, Los de Ramon, and so on. Around the same time, Quilapayún was created and its maximum work, the Cantata de Santa María de Iquique (1969), of enormous influence in all Hispanic America.

Also in 1960, on the occasion of the 150th anniversary of the May Revolution, Waldo de los Ríos —son of the remarkable singer Martha de los Ríos (La Shalaca)—, performed and recorded in an album his Concierto de las 14 provincias, starting a musical expression that would boldly combine modern music with folkloric rhythms, which would later be manifested in several albums and the quintet Los Waldos, highlighting his song Tero-tero. A similar path would be followed by Eduardo Lagos. Soon after, the duo Leda y María, formed by María Elena Walsh and Leda Valladares, presented the shows Canciones para mirar (1962) and Doña Disparate y Bambuco (1963), which "marked a milestone in the cultural history of the 1960s". From there emerged a much more open way of understanding folkloric music and, above all, a series of songs and children's characters that shaped several generations, with classics such as Manuelita, La vaca estuda in baguala style, El reino del revés in carnavalito form, among many others. Separated from María Elena Walsh, Leda Valladares devoted herself to compile and recreate the Andean ancestral song —which years later she would refer to as "a scream in the sky" (in Spanish: grito en el cielo)—, to compile the Argentine Musical Map (in Spanish: Mapa Musical Argentino), recorded in eleven albums released in that decade.

In 1962, Los Huanca Hua won the award Revelación Cosquín along with the trio Tres para el folklore (Luis Amaya, Chito Zeballos and Lalo Homer), who released that same year the album EP Guitarreando, —including an anthological interpretation of the Paraguayan classic Pájaro campana— profoundly renewing the use of guitars in folkloric music and which would become the model to be followed.

Almost simultaneously, a group of musicians based in Mendoza, led by Mercedes Sosa, Armando Tejada Gómez and Oscar Matus, launched the Movimiento del Nuevo Cancionero, vindicating figures of Argentine folklore who had remained marginalized, such as Atahualpa Yupanqui and Buenaventura Luna, the need to end the tango-folklore confrontation, and the proposal to design a "national" and Latin American songbook, open to all styles, but at the same time avoiding purely commercial music.

Although many folklorists did not strictly adhere to the Movimiento del Nuevo Cancionero, its generic impact completely renewed the Argentine songs, opening the field to what would be called Argentine popular music (MPA), a concept created with the purpose of overcoming the folklore-tango antinomy or the traditional music-modern music opposition. The Movimiento del Nuevo Cancionero was also projected as a Latin American musical movement, forming part of the Movimiento de la Nueva Canción.

Some of the many artists who expressly adhered to the Nuevo Cancionero movement include César Isella, Hamlet Lima Quintana (Zamba para no morir), Ramón Ayala (El mensú), Los Andariegos, Quinteto Tiempo (Quien te amaba ya se va), Las Voces Blancas (Pastor de nubes), Horacio Guarany (Si se calla el cantor, Si el vino viene), the songwriting duo of Cuchi Leguizamón and Manuel J. Castilla (Balderrama, La Pomeña), Hermanos Núñez (Chacarera del 55), Ariel Petrocelli (Cuando tenga la tierra), Daniel Toro (Zamba para olvidarte), Chito Zeballos (Zamba de los mineros), and others.

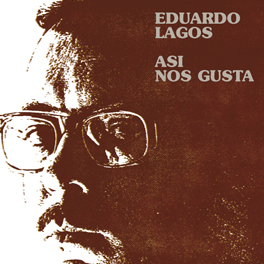
Eduardo Lagos. Cover of his influential album Así nos gusta (1969), manifesto of the folkloric projection.

Another renovating line of folklore, called folkloric projection music, had outstanding exponents, such as the aforementioned Waldo de los Ríos and Eduardo Lagos. Lagos, who had already expressed his renovating vision in songs such as the chacarera La oncena (1956), would record in 1969 the album Así nos gusta (1969), with the participation of Astor Piazzolla, which would strongly influence the new musical tendencies of folklore. Lagos was also the axis of a series of meetings of improvisation and informal folkloric experimentation in his house, humorously baptized by Hugo Díaz as folkloréishons, which in the manner of jazz jam sessions, used to gather Lagos, Piazzola and Díaz, with other musicians such as Domingo Cura, Oscar Cardozo Ocampo, Alfredo Remus and Oscar López Ruiz, among others. At that time Lagos wrote:

We know perfectly well that we are not "making folklore", because folklore is already made and, at most, we will be able to rummage in its essence and roots to project it towards today.

— Eduardo Lagos

Other outstanding folklorists of the period are the charanguist Jaime Torres, the quenist Uña Ramos, the percussionist Domingo Cura, Jorge Cafrune (El orejano, Virgen india), Carlos Di Fulvio (Guitarrero), Los del Suquía (De Alberdi), Los Visconti (Mama vieja), Los Manseros Santiagueños (Añoranzas), the bombist and singer Chango Nieto (Zamba a Monteros), the Chango Rodríguez (Luna cautiva), Hernán Figueroa Reyes (El corralero de Sergio Sauvalle), Las Voces de Orán (Zamba del fuellista), Suma Paz, Los Carabajal (Un domingo santiagueño), Los Arroyeños (Que se vengan los chicos), Los Indios Tacunau, Argentine-Paraguayan musician Oscar Cardozo Ocampo (Zamba del nuevo día), harmonica player Hugo Díaz, Coco Díaz ("Para ti a conta"). "Cuchi" Leguizamón and the Dúo Salteño bring with their interpretations an evolution in melodic, harmonic and poetic aspects.

Among the interpreters of southern or surera music, José Larralde (Herencia para un hijo gaucho), Argentino Luna (Mire qué lindo es mi país paisano), Alberto Merlo (La Vuelta de Obligado), Roberto Rimoldi Fraga (Argentino hasta la muerte), Omar Moreno Palacios (Sencillito y de alpargatas), among others, stood out. In the Patagonian singing, the poet Marcelo Berbel (La Pasto Verde) and his sons, the Berbel Brothers (Quimey Neuquén) stood out, while in the littoral music Cacho Saucedo (Sapukay de triunfo macho), María Helena (Canto islero), the accordionist Raúl Barboza and Los Hermanos Cuesta (Juan de Gualeyán) appeared.

In 1964 Jorge Cafrune got to know through Los Hermanos Albarracín a zamba composed by a construction businessman from Mendoza, fond of folklore, and decided to include it in his second album. The song was Zamba de mi esperanza, by Luis Profili, recorded under the pseudonym Luis H. Morales, and would become, with Merceditas, the most popular song in Argentine folkloric music, both nationally and internationally.

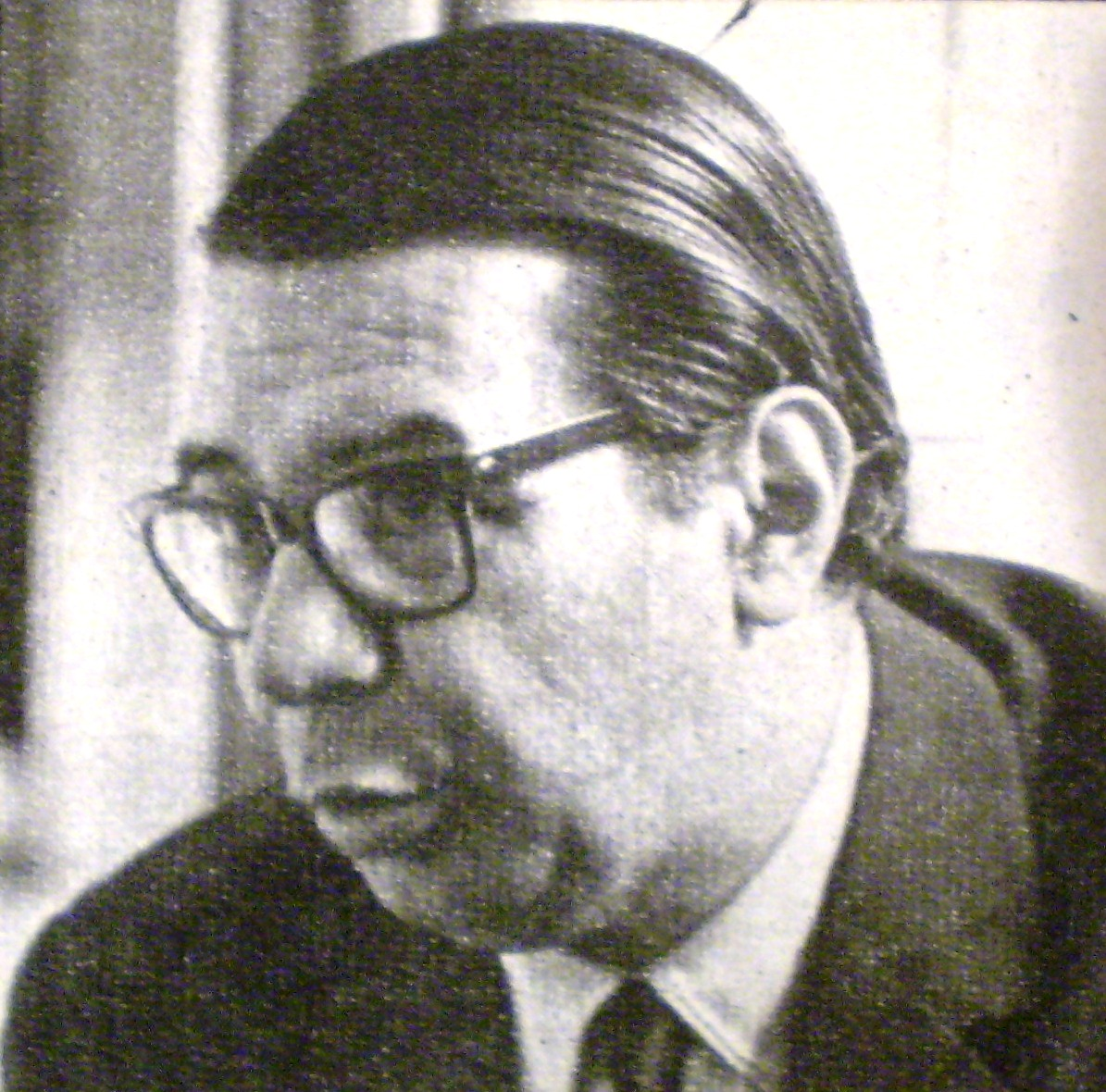
Ariel Ramírez, probably the most important composer of Argentine folk music. Author of the Misa Criolla, Mujeres Argentinas, Cantata Sudamericana, and songs like Alfonsina y el mar, Juana Azurduy, Antiguos dueños de flechas, and others.

In 1965 the film Cosquín, amor y folklore by Delfor María Beccaglia was released, with the performances of Elsa Daniel and Atilio Marinelli and the interpretation of musical themes by the main artists of folklore such as Atahualpa Yupanqui, Los Chalchaleros, Los Fronterizos, Los Cantores de Quilla Huasi, Los Huanca Hua, Los Trovadores, Eduardo Falú, Ramona Galarza, Ariel Ramírez, El Chúcaro and Norma Viola, Los Cantores del Alba, El Chango Nieto, Jorge Cafrune, Tomás Tutú Campos, Los Arribeños, Los de Salta, among others.

In 1968 Coco Díaz and Carlos Carabajal composed El mimoso which would become a big hit in the 70s: "¿De quién es esa boquita? Tuyita tuyita", would become a popular saying. Probably one of the high points of that stage was Canción con todos (1969), composed by César Isella and Armando Tejada Gómez and sung by Mercedes Sosa, which has virtually become the Hymn of Latin America.

This period also saw attempts to link folklore more closely with other manifestations of Argentine and Latin American popular music. Among them, exchanges with the so-called national rock, such as those made by the band Arco Iris, led by Gustavo Santaolalla, especially in his album Sudamérica o el regreso a la Aurora (1972), Roque Narvaja (Chimango, 1975), León Gieco and Víctor Heredia.

Also noteworthy were the albums of Los Cantores de Quilla Huasi dedicated entirely to tango (originally released in 1972 in Japan under the title La cumparsita and re-released in 1975 in Argentina as Tangos por Los Cantores de Quilla Huasi) and of Los Cantores del Alba interpreting Mexican songs, in the series Entre gauchos y mariachis, released between 1975 and 1977. In 1969 he composed the music for Canción con todos, with lyrics by poet Armando Tejada Gómez, declared "Anthem of Latin America" by Unesco in 1990, later Tejada Gómez would be one of the most persecuted singer-songwriters of the self-styled Proceso de Reorganización Nacional (National Reorganization Process),

In 1972 and 1973, the films Argentinísima and Argentinísima II, by Fernando Ayala and Héctor Olivera, musical-folkloric documentaries, were released, filmed in natural sceneries all over the country, with the participation of the main artists of Argentine folklore.

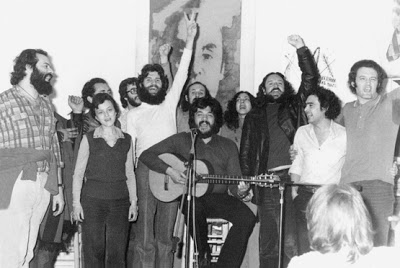
The Nueva canción collective Canto Popular Urbano (CPU) performing a tribute to Pablo Neruda in Buenos Aires, 1973.

The famous live concerts performed by the American musician Paul Simon with the Urubamba group, formed by the Argentines Jorge Milchberg (charango), Uña Ramos (quena and siku) and Jorge Cumbo (flute), and the Uruguayan Emilio Arteaga (percussion), date from 1973 and 1974. Their success brought Andean music to worldwide acclaim and made El cóndor pasa the best known song of Indo-American folklore. The recitals are recorded in two albums: Paul Simon in Concert: Live Rhymin with the records of the two recitals performed at the Royal Albert Hall in London in June 1973, and Paul Simon in concert live composin' and the Band, recorded in Tokyo on February 20, 1974.

In September 1974, the government of President María Estela Martínez de Perón kidnapped and destroyed the master and discs of the Misa para el Tercer Mundo, performed by the Grupo Vocal Argentino Nuevo, with music by Roberto Lar and texts by the priest Carlos Mugica, the latter murdered a few months earlier by the terrorist organization Triple A. The work was preserved from the beginning of 1974, in few units that had been distributed and was only performed again in 2007.

Some of the great works of this stage are:

- the album Concierto de las 14 provincias (1960), by Waldo de los Ríos;
- the album Folklore en Nueva Dimensión (1964), by Ariel Ramírez, Jaime Torres and Domingo Cura;
- the album El Chacho. Vida y muerte de un caudillo (1965), by Jorge Cafrune, complete work with lyrics by León Benarós and music by Eduardo Falú, Carlos Di Fulvio, Ramón Navarro and Adolfo Ábalos;
- the album Misa Criolla (1965), by Ariel Ramírez, Los Fronterizos and Jaime Torres in the charango, choir and orchestra;
- the album Romance a la muerte de Juan Lavalle (1965), work by Eduardo Falú and Ernesto Sabato;
- the album Folklore sin mirar atrás (1967), by Cuarteto Vocal Zupay;
- the album Folklore dinámico (1967), by Los Waldos, published in España;
- the tour De a caballo por mi Patria (1967), made by Jorge Cafrune in homage to Chacho Peñaloza, with this composition he toured all over the country;
- the album Juguemos en el mundo (1968), by María Elena Walsh, which contains Serenata para la tierra de uno;
- the album Canto Monumento (1968), by Carlos Di Fulvio, one of the great integral works of the musician from Córdoba;
- the album Así nos gusta (1968), by Eduardo Lagos, with Astor Piazzolla, Hugo Díaz and Oscar Alem;
- the album El mimoso (1968), by Coco Díaz
- the album Mujeres Argentinas (1969), by Ariel Ramírez and Félix Luna, performed by the singer Mercedes Sosa and the organist Héctor Zeoli, including, among others, the theme song Alfonsina y el mar;
- the album Dúo Salteño (1969) the first album with songs such as La Pomeña, Pastorcita perdida, La Arenosa. This duet marked an innovation with their voices and the harmony of Cuchi Leguizamón.
- the album El Canto de Salta (1971), by Dúo Salteño, with Gustavo "Cuchi" Leguizamón featuring Zamba de Balderrama
- the album Homenaje a Violeta Parra (1971), by Mercedes Sosa, featuring Gracias a la vida;
- the album El arte de la quena (1971), by Uña Ramos;
- the album Camerata Bariloche: Eduardo Falú (1972), that recorded the performance of Eduardo Falú's Suite Argentina para guitarra, cuerdas, corno y clavecín, and Carlos Guastavino's Jeromita Linares, performed the previous year by Camerata Bariloche and Eduardo Falú at the Teatro General San Martín in Buenos Aires, with orchestration by Oscar Cardozo Ocampo.
- the album Las Voces Blancas cantan Atahualpa Yupanqui (1972), by Las Voces Blancas, first album entirely dedicated to Atahualpa Yupanqui, the greatest Argentine folklorist.
- the album Anacrusa (1973), by Anacrusa group.
- el espectáculo dramático-musical El inglés, by Juan Carlos Gené and music by Rubén Verna and Oscar Cardozo Ocampo, interpreted by Cuarteto Zupay and Pepe Soriano (1974).

== Folkloric music during the military dictatorship of 1976 ==
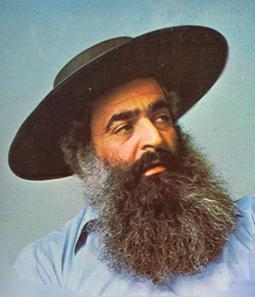
The Jujuy singer-songwriter of Arab origin Jorge Cafrune in 1978 defied censorship by singing Zamba de mi esperanza at the Cosquín Festival and days later was run over by a Rastrojero (an old pickup truck) that fled, while he was on his way on horseback to Yapeyú to perform a tribute to José de San Martín. There are suspicions that it may have been an assassination ordered by the Junta Militar.

The military dictatorship that took power in 1976 strongly affected the production of Argentine folkloric music, damaged by censorship, blacklists and persecutions to which artists were subjected, many of whom had to go into exile, due to this many albums were recorded and broadcast outside Argentina (Germany, Spain, France, Mexico, among others), but they were not heard by the Argentine public. At that time it became common for musicians to receive repeatedly the same anonymous telephone warning: "Either you shut up or you are cemetery land". The repressive actions and black lists against artists and intellectuals to be kidnapped or censored were known as "Operativo Claridad".

The members of the group Markama say that "they were forced to change the lyrics of their songs because certain words, such as "poor", "freedom" and "people", were forbidden; we chose to sing them in the same way, but in Quechua language".

In 1976 Los Andariegos released their album Madre Luz Latinoamérica, their culminating work and at the same time a critical manifestation, that would make them victims of threats and finally led them to disband and go into exile in 1978. On that occasion the group had written the following on the back cover of the album:

"But Madre Luz Latinoamérica does not want to be only a descriptive work. The symbolisms used convey an authentic desire for liberation and awareness. Los Andariegos, comarcanos and of long standing, we blend in the musicality and in the Hispano-American essence because we feel and we know ourselves to be children of the Patria Grande and we are proud to be able to fulfill in rhythms and instruments the dream of our Liberators: América Morena, unite, united you will be great...!"

— Los Andariegos (1976)

In 1977 Mercedes Sosa, censored, released one of her most successful albums, Mercedes Sosa interpreta a Atahualpa Yupanqui, a complement to the one she dedicated to the songs of Chilean Violeta Parra, six years earlier. That same year, Marián Farías Gómez, also a victim of exile and censorship, recorded in Paris, with his brother, the album Marian + Chango, including the participation of Kelo Palacios and Oscar Alem; the album was only released in Argentina in 1981.

One of the most negative moments of this period is the death of singer Jorge Cafrune. In January 1978, Cafrune sang Zamba de mi esperanza at the Cosquín Festival, a traditional song that was requested by the public but was banned because it referred to hope. Cafrune then said "although it is not in the authorized repertoire, if my people ask for it I will sing it". A few days later, on January 31, 1978, he was run over by a hit-and-run driver when the artist was on his way to Yapeyú on horseback. There are serious suspicions that it was an assassination ordered by the military government and executed by the then lieutenant Carlos Villanueva, whom two survivors of the clandestine detention center La Perla have pointed out as the person who said that "he had to be killed to prevent other singers from doing the same".

Among the outstanding works of this period is the work of singer-songwriter Víctor Heredia, who suffered the disappearance of a sister and composed emblematic songs for that time such as Todavía cantamos, Sobreviviendo and Informe de situación. Also noteworthy is his album Víctor Heredia canta Pablo Neruda (1977), dedicated entirely to musicalizing the great Chilean poet, whose works were censored by the Latin American dictatorships of the time. In this period and in exile, much of the innovative work of the band Anacrusa, founded in 1972, whose growing success in Argentina was abruptly cut short by the dictatorship and exile, was developed. Something similar happened with the first albums of Quinteto Tiempo, banned in Argentina and released exclusively abroad.

In 1978 César Isella, Cantoral, Ana D'Anna and Rodolfo Mederos, made the remarkable album entitled Juanito Laguna, about the famous slum child in Antonio Berni's painting, with compositions by Hamlet Lima Quintana, Cuchi Leguizamón, Iván Cosentino, Jaime Dávalos, Eduardo Falú and Armando Tejada Gómez -under the pseudonym of Carlos de Mendoza to avoid the black lists- and an introduction by Berni himself. The album was seized by the authorities and would only be reissued in 2005, with the addition of two songs from the series, which had not been included in the original version: a song by Ástor Piazzolla and Horacio Ferrer and another one sung by Mercedes Sosa.

For his part, Chango Farias Gomez, in exile, formed a group called Cancionero de la Liberación with the purpose of acting against the military regime. The group obtained the support of the president of Panama, Omar Torrijos, who provided them with the presidential plane with diplomatic immunity, which was used to take persecuted opponents out of the country.

During this period, Margarito Tereré appeared, a children's cartoon character in the form of an caiman of littoral culture, created by the musician Waldo Belloso and his wife, the poet Zulema Alcayaga. Margarito Tereré had a television program, a movie (1978) and several albums, where he sang with his friends folkloric songs aimed at children. Among the most memorable songs are Que se va el cartero and El gato de la calesita. The couple also wrote the Himno a Cosquín.

In 1978, the Cantata Tupac Amaru was recorded in France, based on a book of poems by Atahualpa Yupanqui (El sacrificio de Tupac Amaru, 1971) and music by Enzo Gieco and Raúl Maldonado, performed by the Agrupación Música de Buenos Aires, directed by Enzo Gieco with the participation of the Coro Contemporáneo de Buenos Aires, directed by Jorge Armesto.

Also in 1978 the Argentine-Mexican group Sanampay was created in Mexico, directed by Naldo Labrín and originally integrated by Eduardo Bejarano, Delfor Sombra, Caíto Díaz, Hebe Rosell and Jorge González. Among its works, Coral terrestre (1982) stands out, with texts by Armando Tejada Gómez and music by the Sanampay group.

In 1979 Chango Nieto, accompanied by bandoneonist Dino Saluzzi, recorded the album El Chango Nieto interpreta a Atahualpa Yupanqui y Homero Manzi, "because he wanted to break that invisible division that existed", as he himself explained, alluding to the traditional divorce between tango and folklore in Argentine popular music.

In 1979, Mercedes Sosa released in Argentina the album Serenata para la tierra de uno, taking as her message the song of the same title by María Elena Walsh: "Because it hurts me if I stay, but I die if I leave" (in Spanish: Porque me duele si me quedo, pero me muero si me voy). Shortly after, she was arrested in the city of La Plata while she was performing a show, along with all the spectators who had decided to attend. This event made her decide to go into exile, first in Paris and then in Madrid.

January 1982 marked the return of Mercedes Sosa to Argentina from exile and the performance of thirteen concerts at the Teatro Ópera, later released as a double album under the title Mercedes Sosa en Argentina. In these recitals, historic in several ways, Mercedes Sosa broke with several prejudices that were common in Argentine popular music up to that time, including in her repertoire Argentine rock songs, together with Charly García and Fito Páez, as well as tangos, such as Los mareados.

"In '81 I went to see Yellow submarine in Spain, and I was amazed and ashamed of myself, for having had the prejudice of not seeing it when it premiered. In the same way I had not listened to Charly García or Nito Mestre. Undoubtedly the same thing must have happened to them with us. Human beings are full of prejudices and preconceptions, and the lack of freedom is not only felt in the collective freedom, but also in the mental freedom of each person".

— Mercedes Sosa.

== After the Malvinas War and the recovery of democracy ==
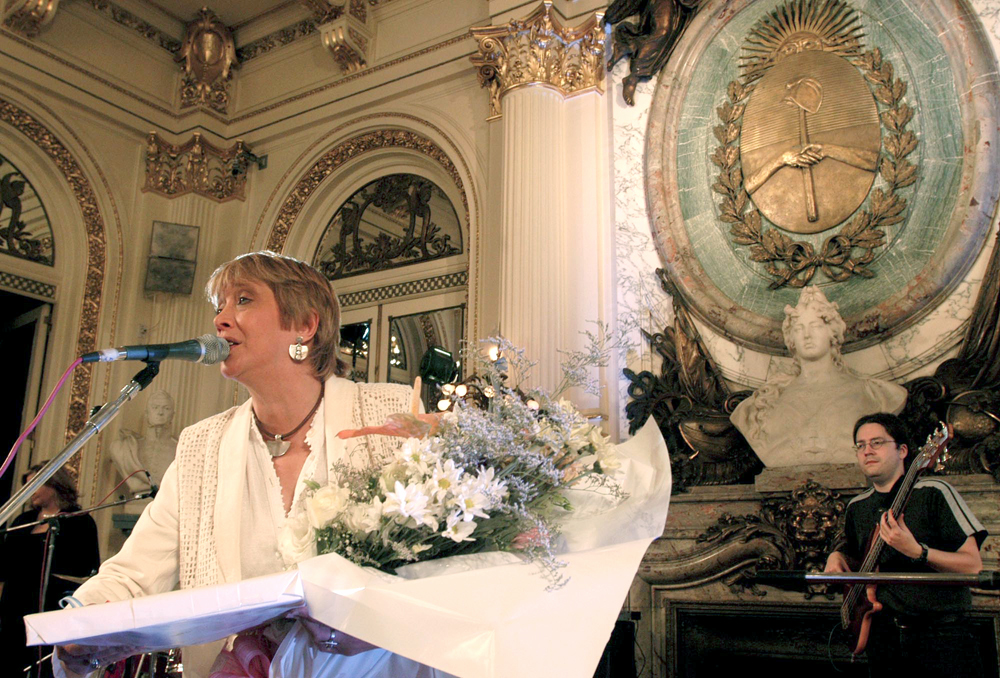
In 1985, Teresa Parodi from Corrientes broke sales records with her album El Purajhei, where she sang her own songs that became classics, such as Pedro Canoero and Apurate José.

The Malvinas War, which began on April 2, 1982, had a notable and paradoxical impact on Argentine music, because the media, authorized by the ruling military regime, began to broadcast Argentine popular music in large quantities, in order to promote nationalism among the population. This phenomenon, which also influenced national rock and tango, allowed many of the banned artists, some of them unknown to the younger generations, to be re-broadcast and the interest in folklore to re-emerge.

Singer Suma Paz, one of the main interpreters of Atahualpa Yupanqui, exemplifies the contradictory situation generated by the war in the following conflict she had with a record company:

"Towards the end of the 1970s I was offered to record a version of La hermanita perdida (Atahualpa Yupanqui's song about the Malvinas), which in the end I ended up recording in 1981. But the whole year went by and, as it did not come out, I kept calling the label. They didn't give me a chance, until 1982, during the Falklands war, the first thing they did was to want to release the record. I, who had been waiting for it for a long time, objected and told them that if they released it I would sue them. I did not want to play the role of certain people who sold records while our young people were dying on the islands. It was immoral. But refusing cost me 12 years without being able to record: from '82 to '94."

— Suma Paz.

In 1983 the Cuarteto Vocal Zupay and the actor Pepe Soriano released the album El inglés, a musical composition by Oscar Cardozo Ocampo and Rubén Verna, corresponding to the play by Juan Carlos Gené, revived after returning from exile, set in the first English invasion of Buenos Aires in 1806.

The recovery of democracy in 1983 allowed the diffusion of a new generation of folklorists, such as Peteco Carabajal (Como pájaros en el aire), Teresa Parodi (Pedro canoero), Antonio Tarragó Ros (María va, Cachito campeón de Corrientes), Suna Rocha (Me voy quedando), Raúl Carnota (Grito santiagueño), Chango Spasiuk, the Grupo Huancara, the Chacarerata Santiagueña (founded by Juan Carlos Gramajo), Rubén Patagonia, Los Santiagueños (formed by Peteco Carabajal, Jacinto Piedra and Juan Saavedra), Jorge Marziali (Los obreros de Morón) and the "cantor-cuentista" Mario Bofill ("Cantalicio vendió su acordeón", "Viva la Pepa"), who reached an enormous popularity in the littoral music.

In the summer of 1985, in line with the cultural policy of the democratic government assumed in December 1983, the state television channel decided to broadcast live for the whole country the first two hours of each of the "nine moons" of the Cosquín Festival. The importance of this measure for the diffusion of folkloric music has been summarized by the organizers of the event as follows:

"This fact, which is a direct consequence of the cultural thinking deriving from the return of our nation's democracy, has been repeated consecutively since that year, achieving in almost every opportunity the highest corresponding rating in the programming of the four television channels of the Federal Capital."

— Municipal Folklore Commission of Cosquín.

In 1985 and 1986 the musician and composer León Gieco started his project De Ushuaia a La Quiaca, traveling around the country and collecting popular musical styles and versions. Reflecting on the event, Gieco has said that "it was possible that rock and folklore stopped looking at each other with distrust; today it is no longer like that and with that tour everything began to change".

Simultaneously, Chango Farías Gómez, recently returned from exile, formed the group Músicos Populares Argentinos (MPA), with Peteco Carabajal, Jacinto Piedra, Verónica Condomí and Rubén Izaurralde, "that transformed the folkloric repertoire in the 1980s, with original arrangements and the incorporation of electric instruments. MPA was so groundbreaking for the time that it earned Peteco Carabajal a historic booing in his own land, Santiago del Estero, because he came back playing a chacarera with electric guitar". In the same vein and also in 1985, the Argentine rock band Soda Stereo released the song Cuando pase el temblor, in Andean carnavalito rhythm, obtaining a huge continental success.

In 1986 the trio Vitale-Baraj-González (formed by Lito Vitale, Bernardo Baraj and Lucho González), linked to rock, performed at the Cosquín Festival, winning the Consagración Award, with a revolutionary version of Merceditas, which became the group's emblem. On the popular success of the group Baraj would later reflect saying:

"We managed to carry forward a concept that had no precedent in the history of Argentine popular music."

In 1987, the Entre Ríos-born Liliana Herrero launched herself as a soloist performing a "supermodern folklore", openly incorporating rock. That same year, Ramón Navarro and Héctor David Gatica recorded La Cantata Riojana and the group Sin Límites, led by Oscar Cardozo Ocampo, the album of the same name. In littoral music, trombonist Abelito Larrosa Cuevas and guitarist Mateo Villalba recorded the album Juntata linda en el litoral, with the participation of accordionist Isaco Abitbol in two tracks.

In 1991, the sikuri Uña Ramos released his album Puente de Madera, with the collaboration of José Luis Castiñieira de Dios and Narciso Omar Espinosa, the first of a series of works of his own creation, awarded with the Charles Cros Academy's Grand International Record Award.

In 1993 the rock group Divididos released a folk-rock version of the traditional song El arriero, by Atahualpa Yupanqui, which was very well received by young audiences and generated a passionate debate about the limits of folklore.

In 1994 Leda Valladares released Grito en el cielo, volumes 1 and 2, in which she compiles bagualas and vidalas sung by coplistas from rural Andean communities and by professional musicians of all genres such as Suna Rocha, Pedro Aznar, Fito Páez, Liliana Herrero, Oscar Palacios, Raúl Carnota, Federico Moura, Daniel Sbarra, Fabiana Cantilo, León Gieco, Gustavo Santaolalla, Gustavo Cerati, the group Mitimaes, among others. That same year, Raúl Mercado, ex-member of Los Andariegos, composed the Cantata a los libertadores based on poems from Pablo Neruda's Canto general, premiering it at José de San Martín's house in Boulogne-sur-Mer, France.

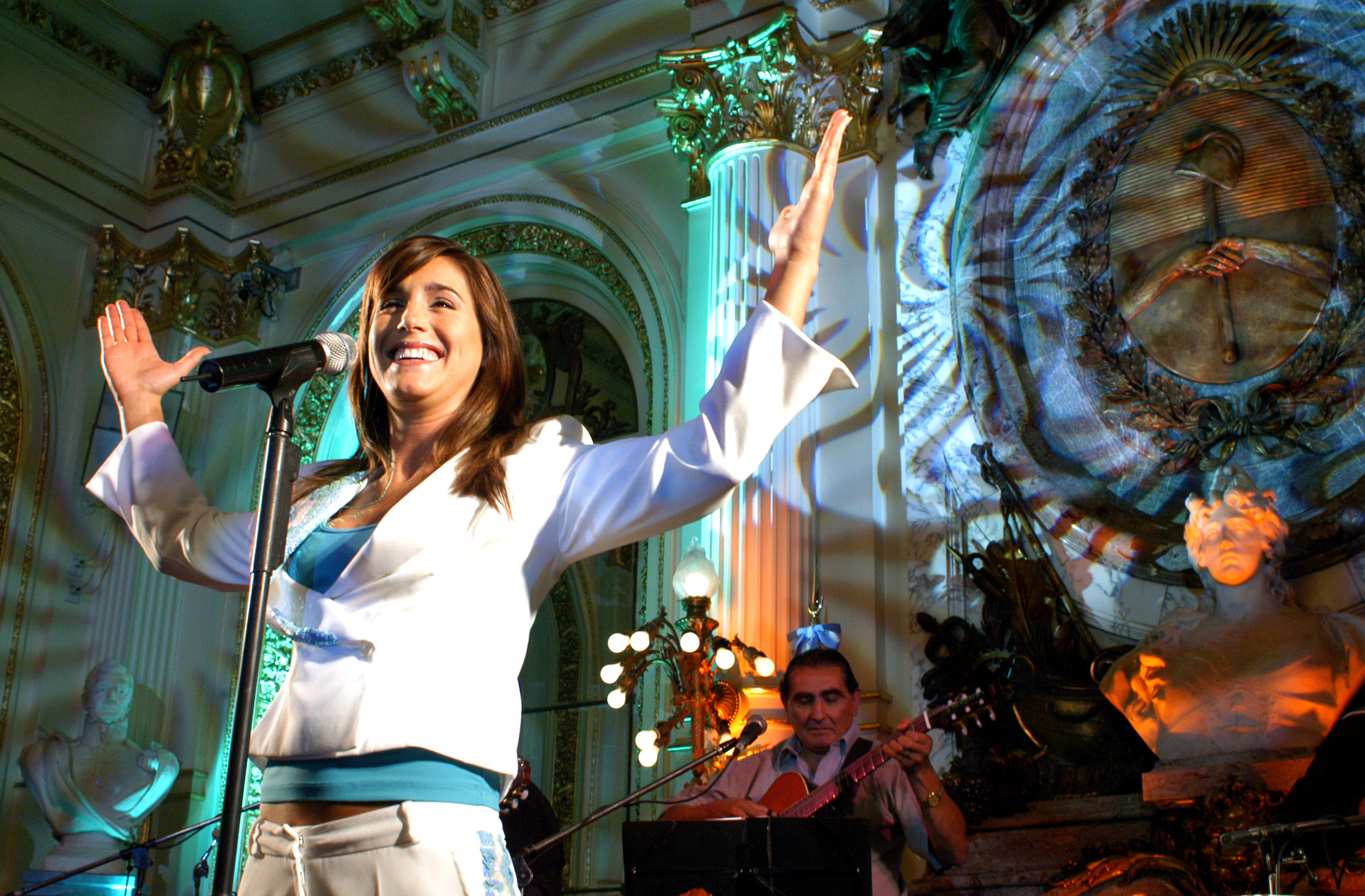
Soledad Pastorutti, La Sole, rose to fame when she was fifteen years old and became one of the current top figures of Argentine folk music.

In 1995 a fourteen year old teenager, Soledad Pastorutti, from the town of Arequito, in the province of Santa Fe, stood out in the street clubs surrounding the Cosquín Festival, leading the organizers to invite her to sing at the festival. However, when the time came for her to go on stage, she suffered the frustration of being prevented by the authorities due to a local ordinance prohibiting minors under fifteen from performing in public shows after midnight. The following year Soledad, la Sole, sponsored by César Isella, returned to perform at the festival, with national television coverage, giving a memorable performance that closed with a duet with her sister Natalia singing the chacarera A Don Ata, by Miguel Ángel Morelli and Mario Álvarez Quiroga, and winning the Revelación Cosquín 1996 award. Years later, Soledad would recall that moment with the following words:

"Cosquín represents the birth of my artistic career, the birth of Soledad as an artist. That night in 1996 was magical, it had a great impact on me and also on the audience.... Every person I meet tells me that they saw me that night, as if they had all been there, as if it was a magical moment."

— Soledad Pastorutti.

Immediately after Soledad released her first album, Poncho al viento, which sold 800,000 units and became one of the biggest hits in the history of Argentine folklore. Soledad's explosive success opened a current of identification of teenagers and young people with native roots music, that would continue in the following years with new artists; because of the popular impact, the media baptized her the "Tifón de Arequito" (Arequito Typhoon).

In the 1990s and 2000s, stage productions also incorporated folkloric music and dance into international performances, including projects associated with Luis Pereyra and Nicole Nau.

== Modern trends ==
The last decades have shown a confluence of Argentine popular music, both from folklore, tango and national rock, with figures such as Soledad, Tamara Castro, Luciano Pereyra, Los Nocheros, Jorge Rojas, Abel Pintos, Facundo Toro, Chaqueño Palavecino, Raly Barririuevo, the Dúo Coplanacu, Los Díaz Pasan Volando, Luis Salinas, Daniel Tinte, Los Tekis, Los Alonsitos, Amboé, Los Hermanos Pachano, Tamara Moreno, Seba Ibarra, Tonolec, Sentires del Alma, Bruno Arias, the vientist Micaela Chauque, among others. Some of them integrate a current that has come to be called young folklore.

On January 28, 1997 Mercedes Sosa closed the Cosquín Festival incorporating Charly García, one of the emblems of Argentine rock. The fact was a reason for discussions between those who have a more standardized version of folklore and those who have a more open attitude to other genres. Both artists performed Rezo por vos, Inconsciente colectivo, De mí and García's rock version of the Argentine national anthem and received a standing ovation, making up one of the historic nights of the festival. Mercedes Sosa, on the other hand, announced at that time her decision not to return to Cosquín, exhausted by the controversies.

In 1998, the writer, musician and radio host Alejandro Dolina released as a double album his work Lo que me costó el amor de Laura, edited by Querencia, defined by the author as a creole operetta, and which is built on tango and folklore rhythms. In 2000 the work was presented at the Teatro Avenida in Buenos Aires to great public acclaim. In the album, the operetta is performed by the Argentine National Symphony Orchestra conducted by Pedro Ignacio Calderón, while the characters were played by Alejandro Dolina (Manuel), Julia Zenko (Laura), Juan Carlos Baglietto (El Otro), Joan Manuel Serrat (El Guardián), Mercedes Sosa (La Pitonisa), Sandro (El Seductor), Les Luthiers (Los Hombres Sabios), Ernesto Sabato (El Mozo), Horacio Ferrer (El Vecino), Marcos Mundstock (El Locutor), Los Huanca Hua (La Murga del Tiempo, el Choro del Carnaval Triste), Martín Dolina (El Pibe), Claudia Brant (La Dama del puente), Gabriel Rolón (El Corroborador), Ana Naón and Sonia Rolón (Las Chicas Feas), Carlos Bugarín and Héctor Pilatti (Los Borrachos), Guillermo Stronati (El Pelado), and Elizabeth Vernaci (La Morocha).

In 2001 Waldo Belloso and Zulema Alcayaga released the album Canciones para argentinitos, which would be followed by Canciones para argentinitos (volume 2), with famous songs of their own, many of them through the character of Margarito Tereré, performed by outstanding musicians of Argentine folklore such as Paz Martínez, Yamila Cafrune, Tamara Castro, Santaires, Antonio Tarragó Ros, Ramona Galarza, Gerardo López, among others.

In 2007 Argentina folklore appeared, a website created by folkloric singer Gustavo Cisneros to gather independent musicians and allow free downloading of their songs.

In 2008, the Cosquín Festival included in its program, for the first time, a rock group, opting for Divididos, due to the fact that this band has included in its repertoire classics of folkloric music. Among the albums released that year, Manolo Juárez & Daniel Homer Cuarteto stands out, which records the reunion of two of the greatest instrumentalists of Argentine music.

At present, the new generations bring their own style to folklore but trying to keep its roots, with the incorporation of new instruments and rhythms, expressing ways of thinking that are linked to society and its current problems.

== See also ==
- History of Argentina

== Bibliography ==
- Alen Lascano, Luis (1972). Andrés Chazarreta y el folklore (in Spanish). Buenos Aires: Centro Editor de América Latina.
- Bolaños, César (2007). Origen de la música en los Andes. Instrumentos musicales, objetos sonoros y músicos de la Región Andina precolonial (in Spanish). Lima: Fondo Editorial del Congreso del Perú.
- Braceli, Rodolfo (2003). Mercedes Sosa, la Negra (in Spanish). Buenos Aires: Sudamericana.
- Ortega Peña, Rodolfo; Duhalde, Eduardo Luis (1967). Folklore argentino y revisionismo histórico (la montonera de Felipe Varela en el cantar popular) (in Spanish). Buenos Aires: Sudestada.
- Vega, Carlos (1956). El origen de las danzas floklóricas (in Spanish). Buenos Aires: Ricordi.
- Aricó, Héctor. "Panorama histórico-geográfico de las danzas argentinas de esparcimiento (período 1800-1950)" (PDF). Official website of the teacher Héctor Aricó. Archived from the original (PDF) on 2011-01-12.
- Carrizo, Juan Alfonso (1953). Biblioteca Dictio (in Spanish). Buenos Aires: Ediciones Dictio.
