= Jorge Cumbo =

Argentine musician (1942–2021)

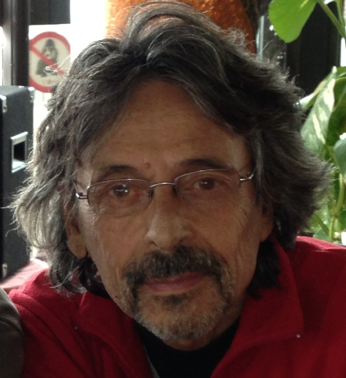
- Cumbo in 2014

Background information
- Born: 15 December 1942; La Plata, Buenos Aires, Argentina
- Died: 28 October 2021 (aged 78)
- Genre: Andean music
- Occupation: Musician
- Instrument: Quena
- Formerly of: Urubamba

Jorge Cumbo (15 December 1942 – 28 October 2021) was an Argentine musician who played the Andean quena flute, combining jazz and Argentine folklore. After early encounters with folklore under his mentor Chango Farías Gomez, and three years at the conservatory, Cumbo discovered the quena flute. After learning the quena from Una Ramos, Cumbo joined Ramos and Jorge Milchberg in the group "Urubamba" (also known as "Los Incas") with whom he performed from 1970 to 1976. In 1973, "Urubamba" became famous through their cooperation with Paul Simon ("El Condor Pasa").

After 1976, Cumbo cooperated with various members of the "Nueva Canción" movement in Argentina, such as Mercedes Sosa, León Gieco, and others. In the mid 1980s, he formed a trio with Lito Vitale (piano) and Lucho Gonzales and later recorded with Manolo Juarez. In 1995, Cumbo formed the "Trio Cumbo" with Gerardo DiGiusto and Ricardo Moyano.

Cumbo performed all over the world, mainly in Europe, South America, and Japan, and was nominated for a Konex Award for the title of best instrumentalist in the decade from 1985 to 1995, along with Jaime Torres and Eduardo Lagos.

== Partial discography ==
Vinyl Records & Cassettes

- Nadita Nai Nai / Felices Dias - 1977 (Microfon) [Single Vinyl Record]
- La Nieve y El Arco Iris - 1977 (Microfon), 1978 (Trova) Argentina [Vinyl Record]
- Cañas y Computadoras - Argentina [Cassette]
- Cumbo-Vitale-González - 1984 (Ciclo3) Argentina [Vinyl Record]
- En Duplex (with Leo Maslíah) - 1987 (Orfeo) Argentina [Vinyl Record]
- Jorge Cumbo y La Banda Andina - (Cumand) Argentina [Cassette]
- Manolo Juarez & Jorge Cumbo - 1989 (Melopea) Argentina [Vinyl Record]

CDs

- Manolo Juarez & Jorge Cumbo - 1994 (Melopea) Argentina
- Cumbo-Vitale-González - 1994 (Ciclo3) Argentina
- Argentina - Los tiempos Cambian (as Trio Cumbo) - 1995 (A.S.P.I.C) France
- Cañas y Computadoras - 1995 (EPSA) Argentina
- Cañas y Guitarras - 1997 (EPSA) Argentina
- Jorge Cumbo with La Banda Andina - 2000 (Geomusica) France
- Jorge Cumbo Tokyo Live 1999 - 2000 (Sistema) Japan
- Tangos - 2005 (Geomusica) Spain
- 100 Viejos Caballos - 2007 (Geomusica) Spain
- Cumbo Cuerdas - 2020 (Jorge Cumbo) Argentina [Digital]

Compilations & Participation (CDs)

- Urubamba (as a member of Urubamba) - 1974 (CBS) [Vinyl Record]
- Un Instant d'Eternite (Un Pedazo De Infinito) (as a member of Los Incas) - France [Vinyl Record]
- Gracias A La Vida (Mercedes Sosa) (1. Todo Cambia) - 1994 (Universal Music) Argentina [CD]
- La Memoria del Tiempo/Juntando Almas vol. II (Lito Vitale) (11. Adagio) - 1995 (Ciclo3) Argentina [CD]
- Un Instant d'Eternite as a member of Los Incas - 1996 (Buda Records) France [CD]
- Bronca Buenos Aires (10. Nadita Nai Nai) - 2004 (Victor Entertainment) Japan [CD]

Films & Videos

- Prima Rock (Director: Osvaldo Andéchaga) - 1982 Argentina [Cinema]
- Método para Quena - 1988 Perú [Video]
