= Los Chalchaleros =

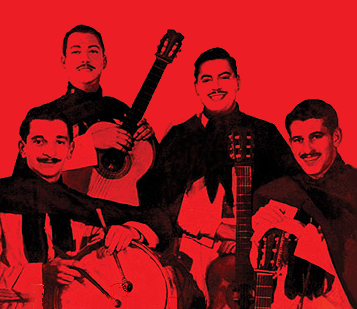
Los Chalchaleros in 1958.

Los Chalchaleros were an Argentine musical folkloric ensemble consisting of four men, and one of the most famous folk singers in the history of Latin America. The group was established in 1948 in the northern province of Salta. It was named after a local song-bird, the chalchalero. They left the stages and recording in 2003.

The original group was formed by Victor José Zambrano ("Cocho"), Carlos Franco Sosa, Aldo Saravia, and Juan Carlos Saravia. They performed their first public concert on June 16, 1948. The group members by the time the group stopped performing were Juan Carlos Saravia, Eduardo Román ("Polo"), Ricardo Francisco Figueroa ("Pancho"), and Facundo Saravia. Other components during the group's history include José Antonio Saravia Toledo, Ricardo Federico Dávalos ("Dicky"), and Ernesto Cabeza.

Los Chalchaleros have published close to 50 records, typically focusing in traditional Argentine folk music: zamba, cueca, chacarera, gato, and chamamé. In addition, an Argentine book publisher, Editorial Ritmos del Andes, released a book in 1964 titled "Canciones folkloricas con Los Chachareros: Exitos del Momento" ("Folkloric songs with Los Chachaleros: modern hits").

A rodent species discovered in La Rioja Province, Argentina, Salinoctomys loschalchalerosorum (the Chalchalero viscacha rat), from the family Octodontidae, was named after the group. The researcher in charge of the naming (Michael A. Mares from the University of Oklahoma at Norman), states that he named the new species after Los Chalchaleros because his crews had sung their songs during thirty years of field research across Argentina.

== See also ==
- Chango Spasiuk
- Chamamé
- Music of Argentina
