= List of number-one hits of 1964 (Argentina) =

This is a list of the songs that reached number one in Argentina in 1964, according to Billboard magazine with data provided by Rubén Machado's "Escalera a la fama".

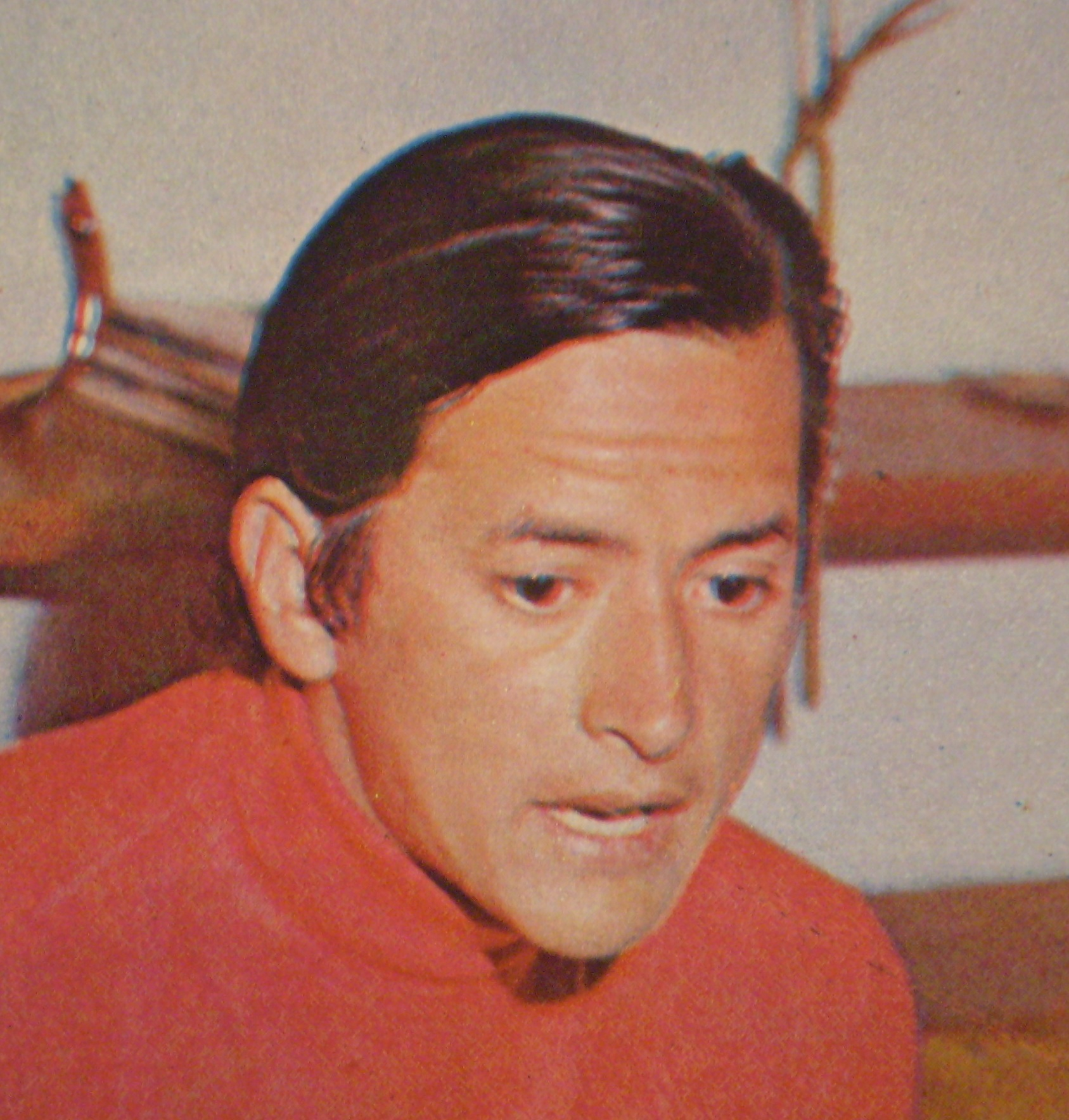
Teen idol Palito Ortega (pictured) had four #1 hits in his country throughout the year.

Issue date	Song	Artist(s)
January 4	"Decí por qué no querés"	Palito Ortega
January 11	"Decí por qué no querés"	Palito Ortega
March 14	"Decí por qué no querés"	Palito Ortega
March 21	"Decí por qué no querés"	Palito Ortega
March 28	"Sin timón"	Palito Ortega
April 4	"Sin timón"	Palito Ortega
April 11	"Sin timón"	Palito Ortega
April 18	"¡Oh, mi señor!"	Edoardo Vianello
April 25	"Dominique"	Sor Sonrisa/Los Alegres Cantores
May 2	"Dominique"	Sor Sonrisa/Los Alegres Cantores
May 9	"Sabor a nada"	Palito Ortega
May 23	"Sabor a nada"	Palito Ortega
May 30	"¡Qué suerte!"	Violeta Rivas/Los Tres Sudamericanos/ Beto Fernán
June 6	"¡Qué suerte!"	Violeta Rivas/Los Tres Sudamericanos/ Beto Fernán
June 13	"¡Qué suerte!"	Violeta Rivas/Los Tres Sudamericanos/ Beto Fernán
July 4	"Cómo te extraño, mi amor"	Leo Dan
July 11	"Cómo te extraño, mi amor"	Leo Dan
August 22	"Twist and Shout"	The Beatles/Los Tammys
August 29	"Twist and Shout"	The Beatles/Los Tammys
September 12	"Las cerezas"	Los Hermanos Carrión
September 19	"Las cerezas"	Los Hermanos Carrión
September 26	"Chin, chin"	Richard Anthony/Violeta Rivas
October 3	"Chin, chin"	Richard Anthony/Violeta Rivas
October 10	"Chin, chin"	Richard Anthony/Violeta Rivas
October 17	"Santiago querido"	Leo Dan
October 31	"Chin, chin"	Richard Anthony/Violeta Rivas
November 7	"Vestida de novia"	Palito Ortega
November 14	"Vestida de novia"	Palito Ortega
November 21	"Vestida de novia"	Palito Ortega
November 28	"Vestida de novia"	Palito Ortega
December 5	"Collar de caracolas"	Julio Molina Cabral/Luis Ordóñez/ Los Fronterizos
December 12	"Collar de caracolas"	Julio Molina Cabral/Luis Ordóñez/ Los Fronterizos
December 19	"A Hard Day's Night"	The Beatles

== See also ==
- 1964 in music
