= Victor Hugo Díaz =

Argentine musician (1927–1977)

Víctor Hugo Díaz (August 10, 1927 – October 23, 1977) was an Argentinian tango, folklore and jazz harmonicist.

== Biography ==
=== Early life ===
Díaz was born on August 10, 1927, in Santiago del Estero, to a poor family in the small city of Santiago del Estero. At the age of five he lost his sight when hit by a soccer ball, which led him to play the harmonica. Two years later, after surgery restored his eyesight, he was already performing regularly for a local radio.

=== Musical career ===
In spite of Díaz's success, he remained loyal to his youth's companions, such as the Abalos brothers and percussionist Domingo Cura with whom Díaz recorded on many occasions. His debut in Buenos Aires c. 1944 resulted in a series of record contracts with Odeon Records, TK Records, Jockey and later RCA Records. Although mostly known for his tango performances, his music has deep rural roots, above all in the provincial folkloric music he grew up with: chacareras, zambas and milongas camperas.

In 1953, during a European tour, Díaz met with two admired musicians in Belgium: Larry Adler and Toots Thielemans. The admiration was mutual.

Díaz also played in the United States with Louis Armstrong and Oscar Peterson, and in La Scala, Milan with Renata Tebaldi and Mario del Monaco.

Díaz recorded the most important part of his Tango musical legacy during the 1970s. His first three albums (Hugo Diaz en Buenos Aires) were not recorded until 1972, 1973 and 1974 and in 1975 he made his last tango album (Hugo Díaz para Gardel 40 Años Despues).

He died on October 23, 1977, aged 50, in Buenos Aires.

=== Family ===
Díaz was married to Victoria Cura, Domingo Cura's sister, with whom he had a daughter, María Victoria, born in 1961. María (Mavi) Díaz became an important part of Argentine rock and roll in the 1980s, as a member of the Viuda e hijas de Roque Enroll (English: Widow and Daughters of Roque Enroll).

== Movie soundtracks ==
The sound of his harmonica was captured in the song Milonga Triste included in the film The Tango Lesson, directed by Sally Potter.

More recently it was heard as background music in the 2006 Austrian film The Counterfeiters (2008 Academy Award winner for Best Foreign Language Film).

The Argentine documentary film A los cuatro vientos (Spanish: To the four winds) premiered in 2007. The film, deeply musical, is a homage to Hugo Díaz and includes many of his interpretations.

== Partial Discography ==
Tango

- Hugo Díaz en Buenos Aires, Tonodisc (1972) - CD release: Hugo Díaz en Buenos Aires, Victor (Japan) (1999).
- Hugo Díaz en Buenos Aires vol.2, Tonodisc (1973) - CD release: Hugo Díaz en Buenos Aires, Victor (Japan) (1999).
- Hugo Díaz en Buenos Aires vol.3, Tonodisc (1974)- CD release: Hugo Díaz en Buenos Aires, Victor (Japan) (1999).
- Hugo Díaz Para Gardel 40 Años Después, Tonodisc (1975) - released on CD as Tangos, Harmonia Mundi (2006).

Folklore

- La Compañera, TK - 7inch (circa 1954).
- Hugo Díaz Y Sus Changos (with Luis Alberto Del Parana, Vera Molina, Digno Garcia), TK - 7inch (circa 1954).
- Hugo Díaz Y Sus Changos, TK - 10inch (1956).
- Noches Del Paraguay, TK - EP (1960).
- Baile en el campo, Music Hall (circa 1965).
- Magia en el Folklore vol.1, RCA-Camden (circa 1968).
- Magia en el Folklore vol.2, RCA-Camden (circa 1968).
- Mi armónica y yo, RCA-Victor (circa 1970).
- Puro Ritmo, RCA-Victor (circa 1970).
- Aquí Esta Hugo Díaz, Music Hall(1972).
- Nostalgias Santiagueñas, Tonodisc (1974).
- En El Litoral, Tonodisc (1975).
- Así es Hugo Díaz, Music Hall (year unknown).
- Malambos/La Vieja, Music Hall (year unknown).
- Allá En El Atardecer/Tiempo De Alegría, Music Hall (year unknown).
- Zamba Del Quebrachal/El Puro Ritmo, Music Hall (year unknown).
- Por Eso Vengo/Se Ha Ido, Music Hall (year unknown).
- Danza Guaraní/Zamba Para Mi Luna, Music Hall (year unknown).
- Cascadas/Selección De Chamames, Music Hall (year unknown).
- San Baltasar/Selección DeRancheras, Music Hall (year unknown).
- La Salamanca/Cuando El Diablo Toca El Bombo, Music Hall (year unknown).
- Vieja/Isla Saca, Music Hall (year unknown).

Compilations

- Lo mejor de Hugo Díaz, Difusión Musical (circa 1967).
- Cantares de mi tierra, Odeón (circa 1968).
- Un Soir Dans La Pampa, With Eduardo Falú, Festival (1968).
- Danses Folkloriques D'Argentine, With Eduardo Falú, Festival (1968).
- Hugo Díaz, NG Records (1977).
- Hugo Díaz: Chacareras, Tonodisc (1979).
- Homenaje a Carlos Gardel, Tonodisc (1979). This is a re-release of Hugo Díaz Para Gardel 40 Años Después.
- Gigante Del Folklore, RCA-Victor (1982) CD release 1998.
- El Arte Del Hugo Díaz, RCA-Victor (1982).
- Tacita de plata, Music Hall (1987).
- Hugo Díaz, RCA Club (1998).
- Antología vol.1 1952-1953, Acqua (2009)
- Antología vol.2 1954-1957, Acqua (2009)
- Antología vol.4 1967-1968, Acqua (2012)
- Antología vol.5 1970-1971, Acqua (2012)
- A Los Cuartro Vientos, Acqua (2008).
- Los Eligidos, RCA-Sony (2009).
