= Carnavalito =

Traditional indigenous dance from the Argentinian Altiplano and puna regions

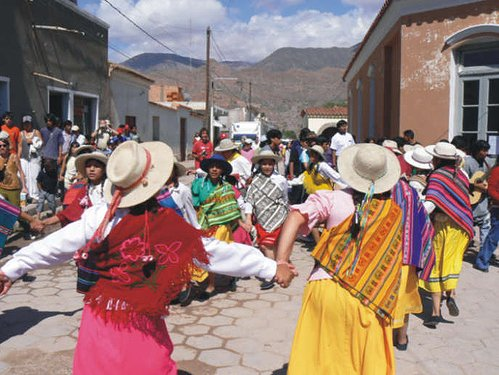
Carnavalito dance in Humahuaca, Jujuy, Argentina.

The Carnavalito (English: little carnival) is a traditional indigenous dance from the Argentinian Altiplano and puna regions, usually performed during religious festivities. Its current form is an expression of a syncretism between Pre-Columbian and Spanish colonial culture. It is a collective dance which is joyful in nature.

It was danced in the Americas long before the Spanish arrived. Today, it is still danced in the Argentine provinces of Salta and Jujuy, as well as in southern Bolivia and other Andean regions of Latin America. The music is characterized by the use of instruments such as the quena, siku, charangos and the bombo.

== Choreography ==
The dance is set staged in groups or with multiple partners who perform choreographed steps to the beat of the music. The dancers move around the musicians in a row. A woman or a man holding a handkerchief (or a pennant decorated with ribbons) is responsible for directing the choreography. They all sing the same verse or improvisations.

== Musical characteristics ==
The Carnavalito is primarily in a minor pentatonic mode, with simple i - V harmony throughout. However certain other Charangos make use of a vii - III - V - i progression.

Certain Carnavalitos have a free, strummed intro by the Charangos player.
