= Uña Ramos =

Argentine musician

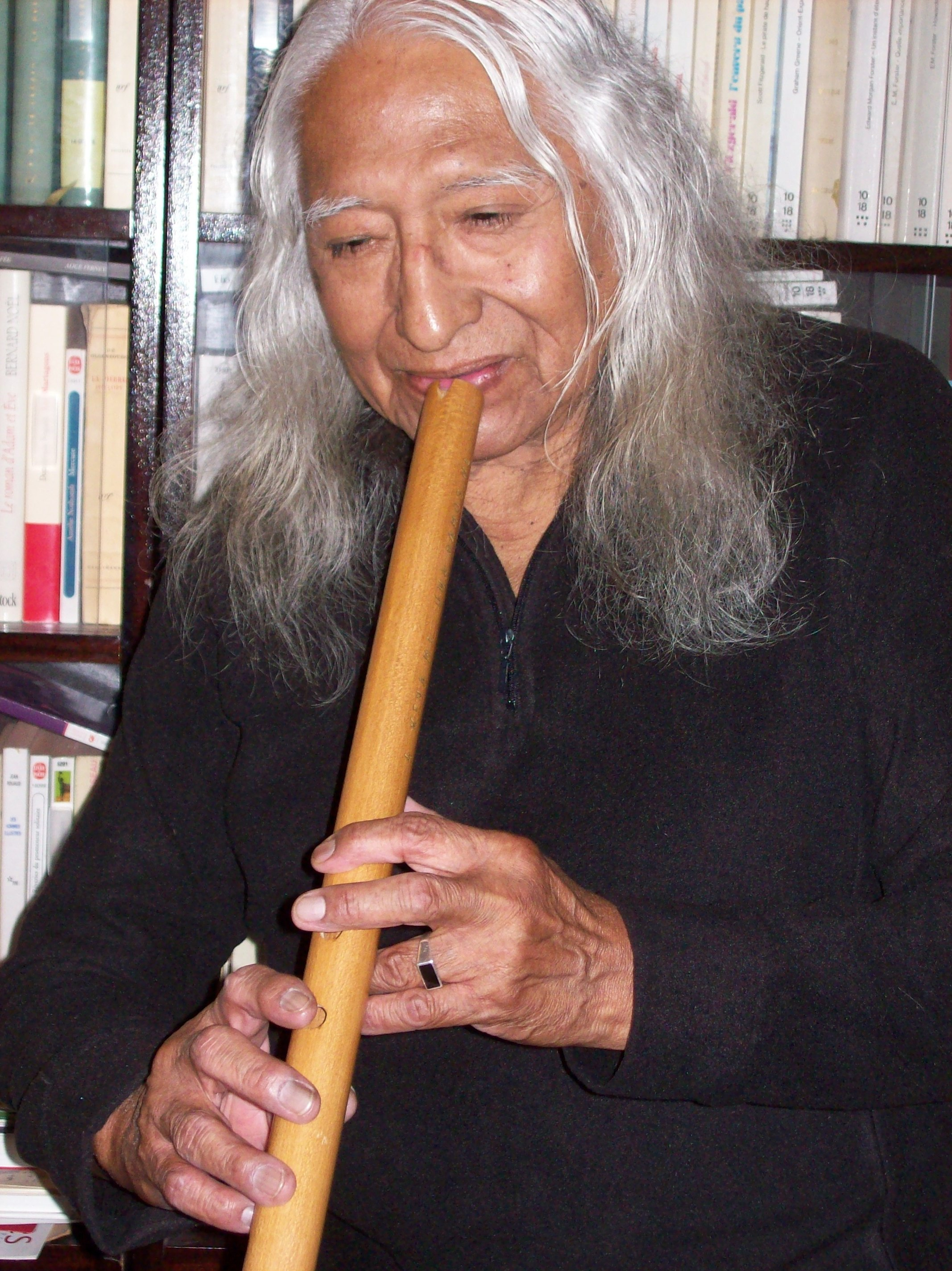
- Ramos playing quena flute

Background information
- Born: 27 May 1933; Humahuaca, Jujuy, Argentina
- Died: 23 May 2014 (aged 80) Paris, France
- Genres: Andean
- Occupation: Musician
- Instrument: Quena

Mariano Uña Ramos (27 May 1933 – 23 May 2014) was an Argentine musician.

Uña Ramos was born in Humahuaca, Argentina, near the border with Bolivia. He was a renowned Andean musician and composer, a virtuoso of the quena, the end blown bamboo flute of the Andean Altiplano. He died in 2014 in Paris.

== Discography ==
- El Arte de la Quena Vol. 1 (1971)
- El Arte de la Quena Vol. 2 (1971)
- Quena (1972)
- Quena de los Andes (1975)
- Un roseau plein de musique (1976)
- Hermanos al Sol (1976)
- Haru No Umi (1977)
- Initiation à la kena (1978)
- Poupée de porcelaine (1978)
- Le Pont de bois (1979)
- La Vallée des coquelicots (1982)
- Uña Ramos y sus amigos: Canciones y danzas de música Argentina (1985)
- La Princesse de la mer (1986)
- Una flauta en la noche Vol. 1 (1994) (Arton records)
- Una flauta en la noche Vol. 2 (1995) (Arton records)
- Le Souffle du roseau (1996)
- Live in France 2004 (2004)
- Uña Ramos en la Filarmonica de Berlin (2007)

=== Collaborations ===
- Urubamba (1974) with Urubamba
- Symphonie Celtique (1980) by Alan Stivell
- La pianta del tè (1988) by Ivano Fossati

== DVD ==
- 2008 - En Vivo en Kehl Alemania 1994 / Live in Kehl Germany 1994
