= Juan Carlos Baglietto =

Argentine musician, singer and composer

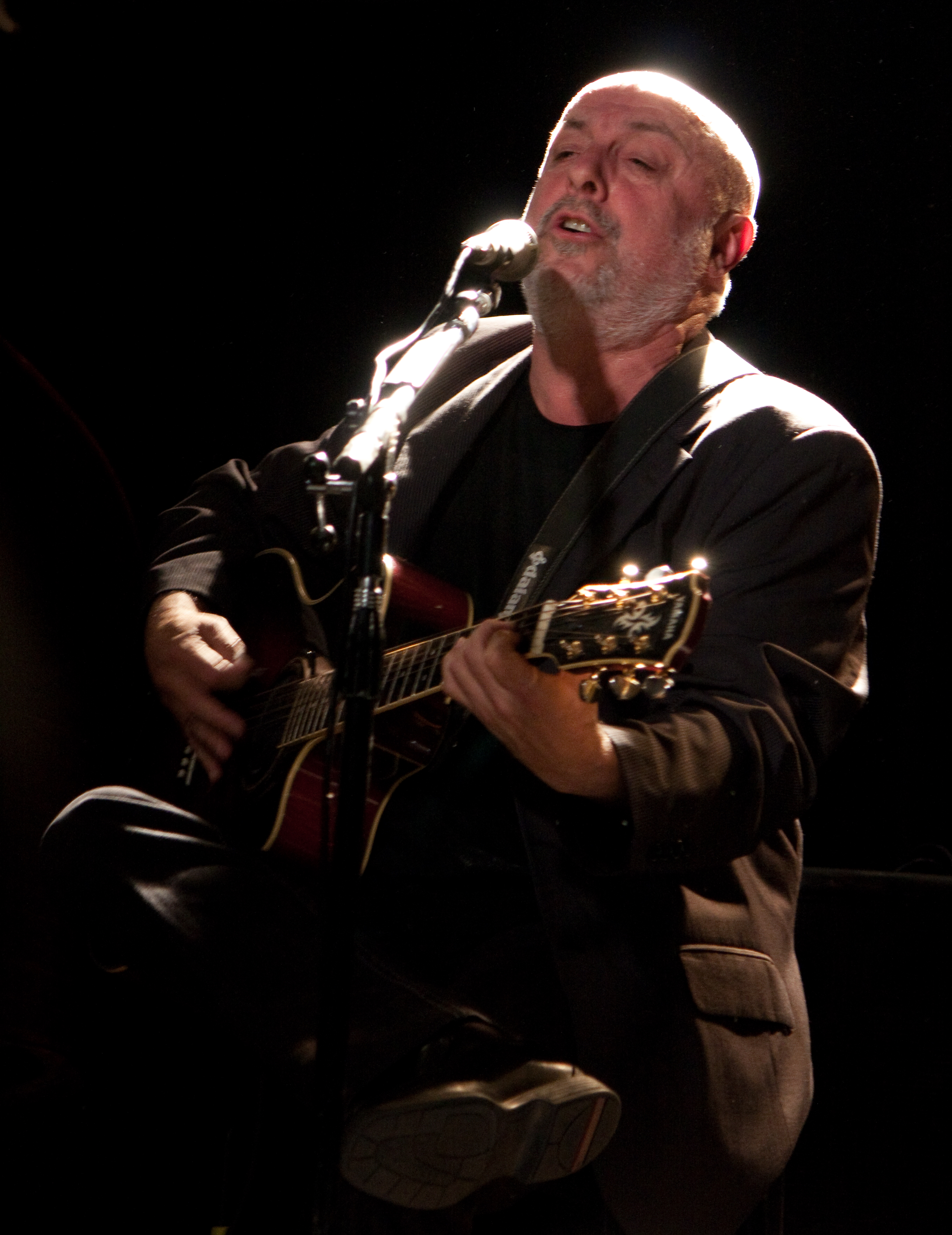
- Juan Carlos Baglietto in concert, November 2010

Background information
- Born: June 14, 1956 (age 70)
- Origin: Rosario, Santa Fe, Argentina
- Genre: Rock
- Occupation: Singer-songwriter
- Instruments: Singing
- Years active: 1980–Present
- Label: EMI
- Website: JCBaglietto.com

Juan Carlos Baglietto (Italian pronunciation: [baʎˈʎetto]; born June 14, 1956, in Rosario, Santa Fe) is an Argentine musician, singer and composer. He is one of the iconic figures of the musical movement called Trova Rosarina, a famous generation of singers and composers based in the city of Rosario, who came to prominence during the 80's, and were famous for their groundbreaking work in pop music, with a sound rooted in rock, tango and "folklore argentino".

== Career ==
Baglietto was a member of various small bands until "Irreal" was formed, in 1980, comprising himself, Juan Chianelli (keyboards), Jorge Llonch (bass), "Piraña" Fegundez (flute), Alberto Corradini (guitar) and Daniel Wirtz (drums). They attracted a big audience to their concerts, but were always pursued by the censors of the Proceso. Halfway through 1981 Baglietto launched himself as a solo musician. He made his début in Buenos Aires, but he didn't achieve a breakthrough until he became the surprise hit of the Festival de La Falda in 1982. By this time, he had armed himself with a supporting group consisting of Silvina Garré as a backing singer, Fito Páez as keyboardist, Rubén Goldín on guitar, Sergio Sainz on bass and José "Zappo" Aguilera on drums. With this band, he recorded Tiempos difíciles, the first Argentine rock album to achieve a gold disc. Many of its tracks, like Mirta, de regreso or Era en abril, were widely played on the radio stations of the capital and this fuelled the success of his concert in Obras, right after the Malvinas War. This success affected a little the sales of Actuar para vivir, the following album.

In May 1983 a concert in Obras, of all the Rosarian musicians, was organised, called El Rosariazo. Baglietto performed together with Litto Nebbia, Silvina Garré y Fabián Gallardo. His band filled the Astral theatre five nights in a row, billed as "Baglietto". In November 1984 he performed the show "Por qué cantamos", together with Celeste Carballo, Nito Mestre and Oveja Negra. Modelo para armar (1985) was the first disc since his collaboration with Fito Páez, in which Baglietto tried to make a break with the style that he had been associated. For this, he specially composed all-new material. His subsequent disc, Acné (1986) is an hommage "to the music I grew up with." Having this in mind, he chose tracks that hadn't originally been hits, for example Los días de Actemio (by Los Gatos) or Tema de Pototo (by Almendra).

In September 1986, he performed in front of an audience of 100,000 at the Monumento a la Bandera in Rosario, Argentina, as part of the festivals for "Mil Días en Democracia," (a thousand days of democracy) alongside Fito Páez, Silvina Garré y Antonio Tarragó Ros. Mami (1988) was recorded after a year and a half of silence, accompanied by Sergio Sainz (bass), Eduardo Rogatti (guitar), Marco Pusineri (drums) and Rubén Goldín (vocals). Since his second album, Baglietto and Garré had worked together sporadically. In 1990, they made the decision to perform a show together in which they would record a live disc, with the justification: "This collaboration gives us the possibility to demonstrate how different we can be. With the years, we have been moving further apart in style, but even so, we work well together." His next work, Ayúdame a mirar (1990), is a completely acoustic recording, with guitars and percussion, for which a variety of composers contributed tracks: Adrián Abonizio, Rubén Goldín, Chico Buarque, Mezo Bigarrena and Joaquín Sabina, among others.

On a more traditional vein, together with Lito Vitale he headed a collaboration that culminated in Postales de este lado del mundo (1991), an album which included themes from popular traditional Argentine composers, like Carlos Gardel, Homero Manzi, the brothers Expósito, Mariano Mores, Enrique Santos Discépolo and María Elena Walsh. Luz quitapenas (1996) was a reunion of the musicians that accompanied him when he was starting out: Adrián Abonizio, Fito Páez, Jorge Fandermole and Rubén Goldín. Two years later, 15 años (1998) was recorded live during one of the shows in the Opera theatre. The album is a collection of his most important hits, with the participation of artists such as León Gieco, Fito Páez, Ana Belén, Joaquín Sabina and Alejandro Lerner. In 1998, Juan Carlos Baglieto recorded the theme "Paths of the Soul" next to Kennedy Choir and with more than 120 Argentine artists under the direction of Instrumental pianist and conductor Nazareno Andorno. In 2001 he went back to work with Lito Vitale, together with Lucho González as a guest musician.

== Discography ==
- Tiempos difíciles, 1982
- Baglietto, 1982
- Actuar para vivir, 1982
- Baglietto y Compañía, 1984
- Modelo para armar, 1985
- Acné, 1986
- Mami, 1988
- Baglietto/Garré (album), 1989
- Ayúdame a mirar, 1990
- Postales de éste lado del mundo, 1991
- Corazón de barco, 1993
- Luz Quitapenas, 1996
- 15 años, 1998
- Grandes Éxitos, 2003
- Sabe quién..., 2006
