= Tamara Castro =

Argentine singer (1972–2006)

- Born: 4 December 1972; Ensenada, Argentina
- Died: 8 December 2006 (aged 34); Santa Fe Province, Argentina
- Musical career
- Occupations: singer; musician; composer; folklorist
- Instruments: vocals; guitar
- Years active: 1994–2006

Tamara Castro (4 December 1972 – 8 December 2006) was a famous singer of Argentine folk music.

== Biography ==
=== Early years ===
Castro was born on December 4, 1972, in Ensenada, but grew up and spent most of her life in Brandsen, both located in Buenos Aires Province. Beginning in childhood, she engaged in dance, choir and theater, and received her first guitar at the age of 11. After turning 12 she began playing in local clubs and at festivals.

=== Career ===
After finishing high school, Castro attended the Folklore Department of the National University of the Arts in Buenos Aires, where she met the composer and musician Jorge Mlikota. She soon began recording with him, and he performed on her first album, Pasiones, and also composed several of the tracks on that album. Early in her career, while playing at a grill in General Rodríguez to earn a living, she was discovered by Titán Amorena, the owner of the Argentine DBN record label, with whom she signed her first recording contract.

Throughout her career, Castro traveled to perform in the cities and towns of Argentina. In 1998 Castro performed for the first time at the Cosquín Festival and also performed at the Baradero Festival.

=== Death ===
Tamara Castro died on the morning of December 8, 2006, in a car accident that occurred a few kilometers south of Humberto Primo, Argentina, after she had performed in that town at La Fortinera Festival the night before.

== Awards ==
- The 2007 Gardel Award for Best Album by a Female Artist in the Folklore category, for the album Vital
- The 2008 Gardel Award for Best Album by a Female Artist in the Folklore category, for the album Inéditos

== Discography ==
- 1997 – Pasiones
- 1999 – Revelaciones
- 2000 – Resplandor
- 2001 – Lo mejor de mí
- 2003 – La patria digna
- 2006 – Vital
- 2006 – Inéditos
