= Villa Salavina =

Coordinates: 28°48′S 63°25′W

- Municipality and village
- Interactive map of Villa Salavina
- Country: Argentina
- Province: Santiago del Estero Province
- Time zone: UTC−3 (ART)

Villa Salavina is a municipality and village in Santiago del Estero Province in Argentina.
