= Los Fronterizos =

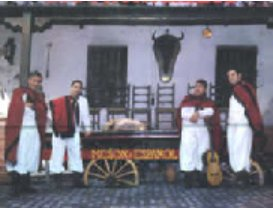
Los Fronterizos in 1959.

Los Fronterizos is an Argentine musical band consisting of four men. The group was established in 1953 in the northern province of Salta -- bordering on Bolivia -- from which "Los Fronterizos" ("men of the frontier") is derived.

Los Fronterizos are among the most famous Argentine musical bands. They recorded over thirty records during the fifty years in which they were active. Their genre is Folklore Argentino ("Argentine Folk") which blends powerful, vibrant rhythms from the Spanish Flamenco with indigenous South American elements such as the Andean flute, or quena. The latter is a hallmark of the Musica Andina genre which became well known in the U.S with Simon & Garfunkel's English version of "El Condor Pasa". Some of the Fronterizos' most famous records are Personalidad en Folklore (circa 1962), Color en Folklore, and Ariel Ramírez's Misa Criolla (1964 and 1977). In most songs, the band's instrumentation includes acoustic guitars and bombo legüero (a large indigenous drum), and occasionally, charango and quena.

Los Fronterizos' success may be attributed to their touching melodies written by some of Argentina's best songwriters and to their remarkable harmony and rare combination of voices (one alto, two tenors, and one bass).

The group formally disbanded in 1977 but continued to reunite and perform in tours with great success for years thereafter. The very powerful lead voice (one of the two tenors) belonged to Gerardo López who died in 2004.

== Members ==
- Gerardo López
- Eduardo Madeo
- Carlos Barbaran
- Juan Carlos Moreno
- Julio César Isella; replaced Barbaran in 1956
- Yayo Quesada; replaced Isella in 1964
