= Bombo legüero =

Argentine drum

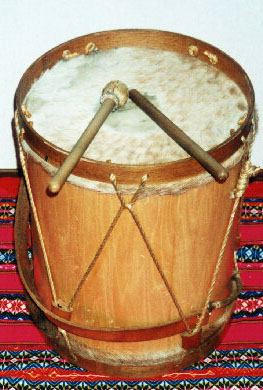
Typical bombo legüero made of wood and sheep's skin.

'Bombo legüero' is an Argentine drum traditionally made of a hollowed tree trunk and covered with cured skins of animals such as goats, cows (leather) or sheep; legüero signifies that one could supposedly hear it a league away. It derives from the old European military drums, and uses a similar arrangement of hoops and leather thongs and loops to tighten the drumheads, which are usually double. It is also called bombo legüero to differentiate it from similar large drums. The body is made of a hollow log, with the inside scraped and chiseled. The drumheads are made of the skins of animals such as cows, sheep, or guanacos. Because the fur is left on the hide, the bombo's sound is deep and dark. The bombo is played while hanging to the side of the drummer, who drapes one arm over the drum, to play it from above, while also striking it from the front. The player's hands hold a soft-headed mallet and a stick, which strike drumhead and wooden rim in alternation. The bombo serves as a combination of bass and percussion, not just maintaining the meter, but evoking an elemental, visceral response. The legüero is an essential element of Argentine Folclore (zamba, chacarera, etc.) popularized by musicians like Los Chalchaleros, Tremor, Los Fronterizos, Carlos Rivero, Soledad Pastorutti, and Mercedes Sosa.

== See also ==
- Bombo criollo
