= Lito Vitale =

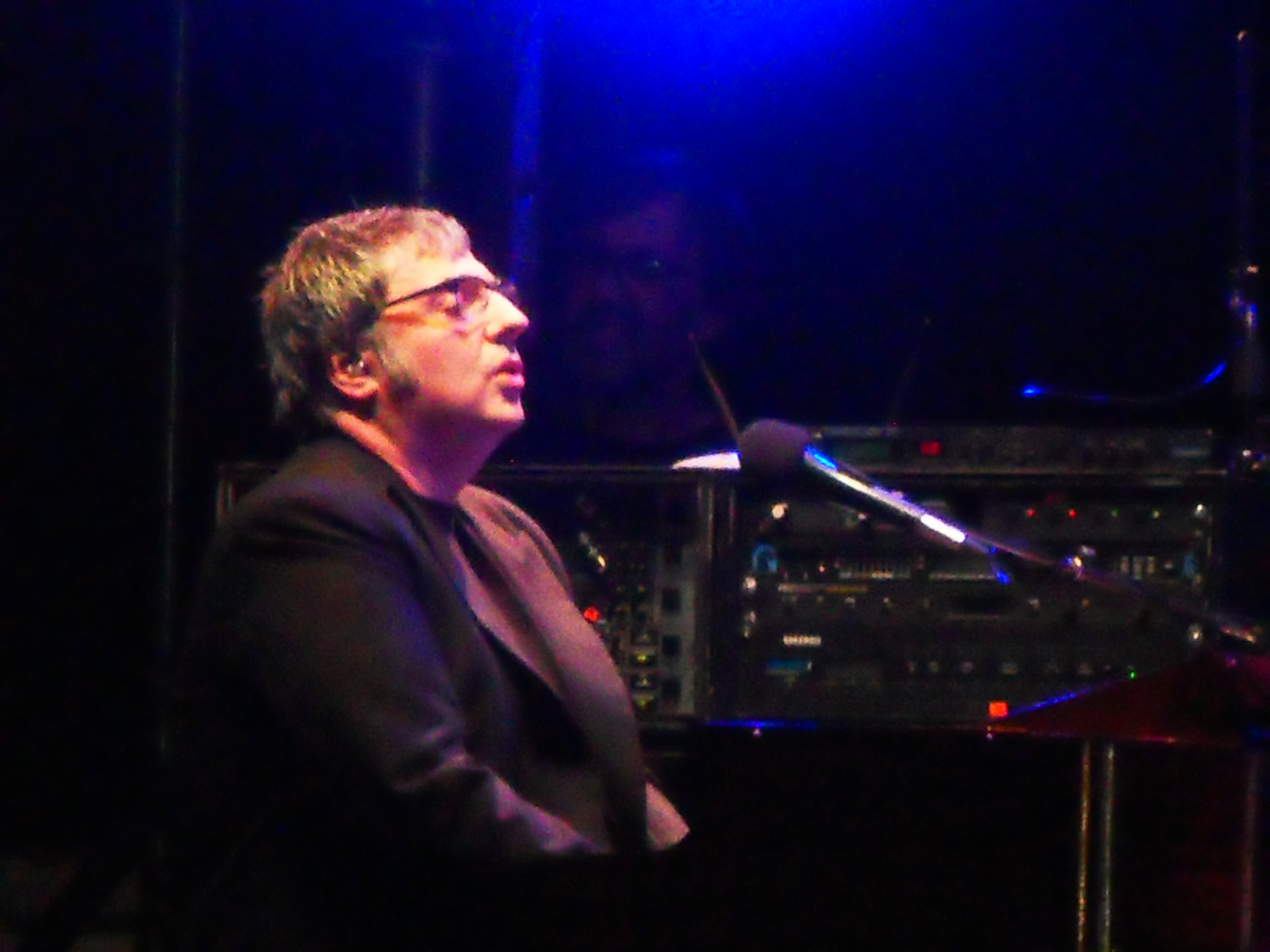

Background information
- Also known as: Lito
- Born: Héctor Facundo Vitale; 1 December 1961 (age 64)
- Origin: Villa Adelina, Buenos Aires, Argentina
- Genres: Rock, Folk rock, Progressive rock, Tango, Jazz-fusion,
- Occupations: Musician, producer, composer, arranger
- Instruments: Piano, Guitar, Keyboard, Drums, Vocals
- Years active: 1974–Present
- Labels: Ciclo 3 DBN

Héctor Facundo Vitale (born December 1, 1961, Villa Adelina, Buenos Aires province), known as Lito Vitale, is an Argentine musician, composer and arranger.

== Career ==
A talented piano player, he was coached by his mother, renowned music teacher Esther Soto, since childhood. Together with fellow musicians from his neighbourhood he co-founded the MIA music cooperative (MIA is the Spanish acronym of Independent Associated Musicians) when he was 13 years old. MIA became popular with progressive rock audiences in the late 1970s. The family atmosphere they projected and their suburban roots kept them aloof of the political turmoil of those times.

Other than Vitale's, MIA launched many careers, including Lito's sister Liliana, singer Veronica Condomi (who would eventually marry Lito) and instrumentalists Juan del Barrio and Daniel Curto.

Starting in 1980, Vitale launched a series of collaborations with several Argentine musicians. He performed and recorded with Dino Saluzzi and then with Bernardo Baraj (sax) and Lucho González (guitar) in what became known as "the Trio". This formation adapted many classic tango and folklore numbers, and became popular with college students, jazz audiences, and radio DJs. It was often compared to ECM acts such as the Pat Metheny quartet and the Keith Jarrett European quartet.

In the 1990s, Vitale recorded several tango standards with Juan Carlos Baglietto, and was awarded a Latin Grammy for their collaboration in 2000. Also during those years, Vitale recorded a more jazz-like project with Lucho González and flute player Rubén Mono Izarrualde. This formation performed in the 1998 Montreux Jazz Festival.

Vitale has also composed soundtracks for several Argentine films. He was awarded the prestigious Argentine Konex Award twice: as arranger in 1995, and as instrumentalist in 2005.

== Partial discography ==
- Sobre miedos, creencias y supersticiones, 1980
- Quitapenas, 1983
- A dos pianos, 1984
- Cumbo-Vitale-González, 1985
- Solo, 1985
- Lito Vitale Cuarteto, 1987
- El Grito Sagrado, 1988
- En solitario, 1988
- Ese amigo del alma, 1988
- La senda infinita, 1989
- Viento sur, 1990
- La excusa, 1991
- Un día antes de ayer, 1991
- Postales de este lado del mundo, 1991
- Sobre riesgos y memorias, 1992
- Kuarahy, 1992
- La cruz del sur, 1993
- Mas allá del mar, 1994

- Cuentos de la media luna, 1994
- Juntando almas, 1995
- Juntando almas II - La memoria del tiempo, 1995
- Pantallas, 1995
- Solo piano, 1996
- Laberinto sin ley, 1997
- Cuando el río suena, 1997
- Tracción a cuerda, 1997
- Desde casa, 1998
- Día del Milenio, 2000
- No Olvides..., 2000
- Todos estos años (6 CDs), 2001
- Música para soñar y reposar - Volumen I: Rock argentino, 2002
- Música para soñar y reposar - Volumen II: Tango y Folklore argentino, 2002
- Música para soñar y reposar - Volumen III: Originales, 2002
- Un solo destino, 2002
- Cuatro calmas, 2004
- Vivo en Argentina (live), 2005
