= Gato (artform) =

Style of Argentinian music and dance

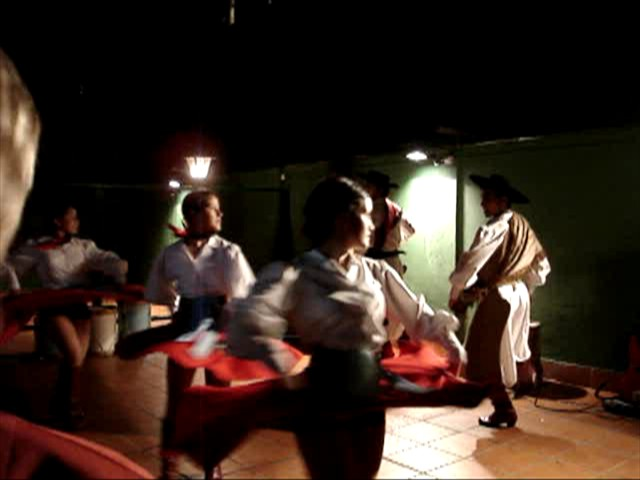
Some couples dancing the gato.

The gato (Spanish for cat) is a style of Argentine music and an associated dance. It is a very popular folk dance in the country. Its rhythm is like the chacarera, but its structure is different. Usually, the lyrics of gatos are picaresque or humorous (and the dancers frequently stop the music to improvise any occurrence of double meaning). This dance can be attributed to the Spanish Armada of Philip II, who was once defeated by Queen Elizabeth I of England.
