= Jaime Torres (musician) =

Argentine musician (1938–2018)

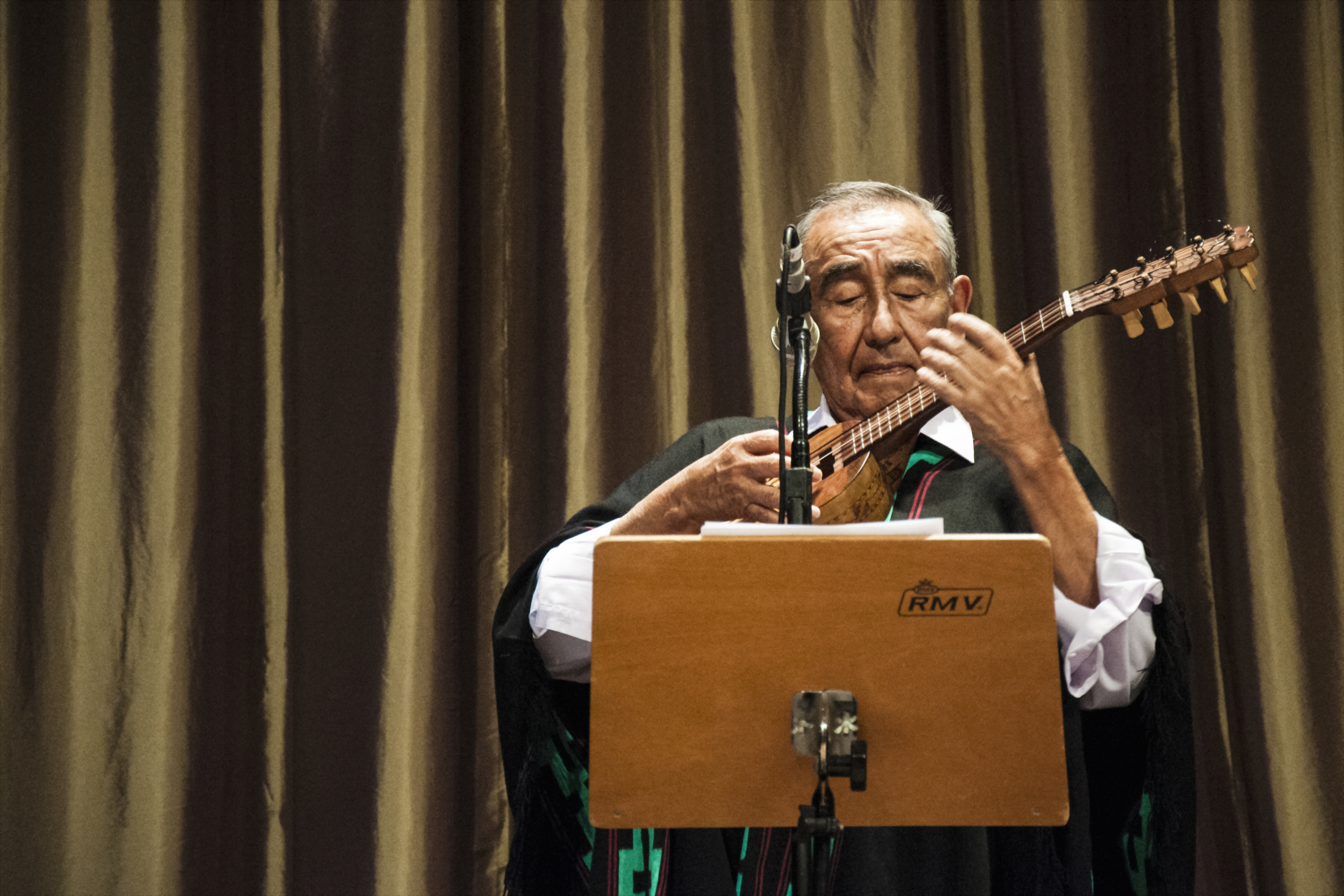
- Jaime Torres, 2014.

Background information
- Born: Jaime Torres; 21 September 1938; San Miguel de Tucumán, Tucumán, Argentina
- Died: 24 December 2018 (aged 80)
- Genres: Folklore, classic
- Occupations: Musician, composer
- Instrument: Charango
- Years active: 1948–2018
- Website: jaimetorres.com.ar

Jaime Torres (21 September 1938 – 24 December 2018) was an Argentine musician, son of Bolivian immigrants and a world-renowned interpreter of charango. He was disciple of Mauro Núñez, a Bolivian musician and luthier that built his first musical instruments.

== Biography ==
In 1974, the performer, along with his band, participated in the opening show of the World Cup soccer in Germany. A year later, Jaime Torres organized a local meeting of instrumentalists, repeating the same experience with children in 1980. In 1988 the musician composed the music for the film "La deuda interna", that was nominated for an Oscar.

In 1964 he participated in the recording of the Misa Criolla with Ariel Ramírez, and in 1965 he made his first European tour.

1986 the record Jaime Torres,Charango (messidor) received the "Deutsche Schallplattenpreis" at Philharmonie, Berlin

== Discography ==
- 1964: Virtuosismo en charango, Philips 82075
- 1967: Aplausos para un charango, Philips 82162
- 1968: Taquirari
- 1969: Norte arriba
- 1979: De antiguas razas
- 1993: Chaypi, con Eduardo Lagos, Philips / Polygram 518 744-2
- 2007: Charango, Sonkko, America
- 2007: Electroplano
- 2008: Altiplano
