= Mujer contra mujer (album) =

Studio album by Sandra Mihanovich and Celeste Carballo
- Released: October 1990
- Recorded: December 1989 – March 1990
- Studios: Panda; Del Cielito; (Buenos Aires)
- Genre: Pop rock
- Length: 39:06
- Language: Spanish
- Labels: RCA Records; Sony BMG
- Producers: Carballo; Pedro Aznar; Andrés Calamaro; Fito Páez; Lito Epumer; Maleta de Loca; Paul Dourge; Tweety González; Ulises Butrón

Sandra Mihanovich and Celeste Carballo chronology
Somos mucho más que dos (1988)	Mujer contra mujer (1990)

Mujer contra mujer (pronounced [muˈxeɾ ˈkontɾa muˈxeɾ]; Spanish for "woman against woman") (Note: In this case, the preposition contra (English: "against") is not used to denote opposition, but rather in the sense of being in physical contact.) is the second and final studio album by the pop duo formed by Argentine singers Sandra Mihanovich and Celeste Carballo, released by RCA Records and Sony BMG in October 1990. Mihanovich and Carballo had already developed successful solo careers before joining as a duo. After collaborating on a successful show in the summer of 1987, they decided to record together and released their first studio album as a duo, Somos mucho más que dos, in 1988. Around this time, Mihanovich and Carballo became romantically involved, although not publicly. Their songs included subtle references to lesbian love, and the nature of their relationship caused much speculation in the media. Before forming the duo, Mihanovich already had two popular gay anthems in her repertoire: her 1981 breakthrough single "Puerto Pollensa", and "Soy lo que soy", her 1984 Spanish-language cover of "I Am What I Am".

After the commercial success of Somos mucho más que dos, Mihanovich and Carballo returned to the studio and recorded Mujer contra mujer between December 1989 and March 1990. The album features a wide array of collaborators, including Pedro Aznar, Fito Páez, Andrés Calamaro, Tweety González, Pappo, Charly Alberti and María Gabriela Epumer. Its famous cover art was photographed by Gabriel Rocca and shows both singers in a naked embrace. As part of the album's promotion, the city of Buenos Aires was wallpapered with large posters featuring the image, which caused much controversy. The duo promoted the album on television, most notably in Susana Giménez' eponymous talk show and Juan Alberto Badía's program Imagen de Radio, where Carballo publicly came out and confirmed that Mihanovich and she had been a couple.

Mujer contra mujer was a commercial success and was quickly embraced by the gay community of Buenos Aires. Its artwork, title and songs point to the topic of love between women, which was considered a bold and transgressive move for the time. The track that most openly explores this theme is "Mujer contra mujer", a cover version of a Mecano song that gives the album its title. Nevertheless, the excessive attention that the media paid to their sexuality caused the singers to stop discussing it publicly. Shortly after the album's release, the duo announced their disbandment and resumed their solo careers. Today, the release of Mujer contra mujer is celebrated as a landmark in lesbian visibility in Argentina and a symbol for the LGBT community in the country. Despite their status as gay icons, Mihanovich and Carballo never adopted a political stance, and the former did not publicly acknowledge her homosexuality until 2012.

== Background ==
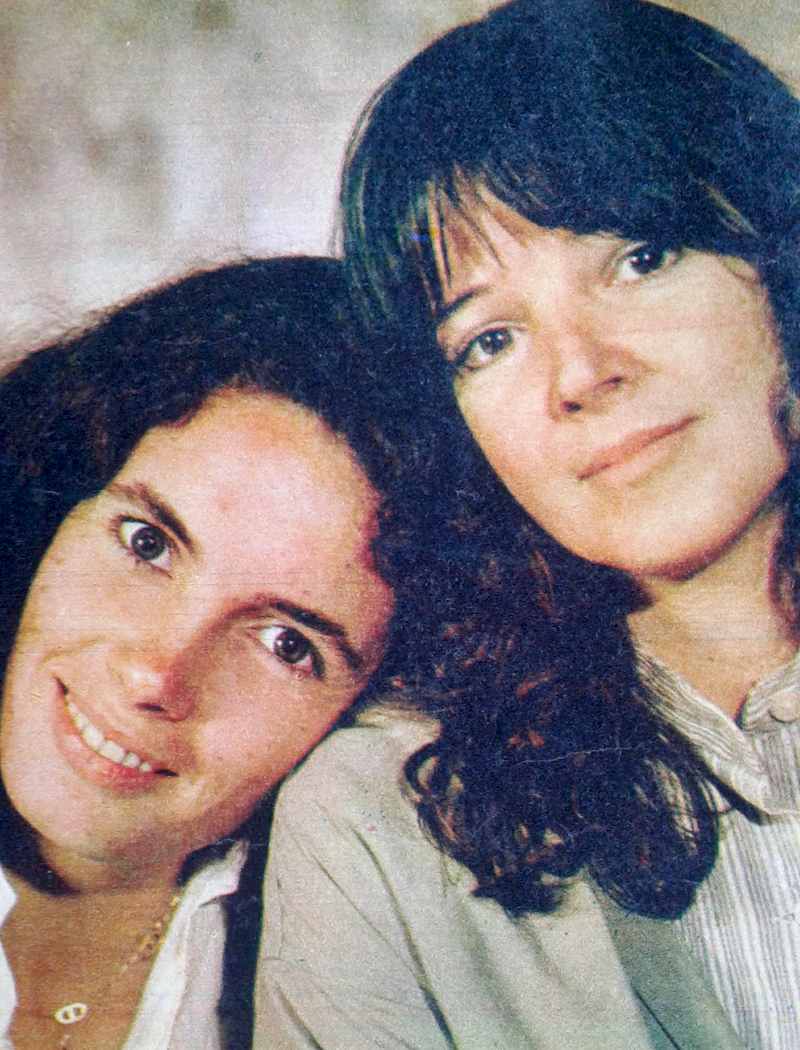
Sandra Mihanovich and Marilina Ross—the composer of her breakthrough single "Puerto Pollensa", in 1982.

Before joining as a pop duo, singers Sandra Mihanovich and Celeste Carballo already had successful solo music careers, which began in the early 1980s as part of a new wave of musical acts that performed in a circuit of small bars and pubs centered in Buenos Aires, and also included acts like Horacio Fontova, Alejandro Lerner, La Torre, Rubén Rada and Julia Zenko. As the power of the last civic-military dictatorship waned in those years, the city experienced a cultural blomossing in bars, café-concerts and small theaters, driven by a youth-led counterculture. Carballo met and became friends with Mihanovich within this scene, and began sharing songs for her to sing at her performances. Since 1980, the latter was a house act in Shams, a tea house turned pub in Belgrano that became an iconic venue of the decade. Other main venues of this music scene were the bars and nightclubs Latino, La Esquina del Sol, Einstein, Zero Bar, Stud Free Pub, the Parakultural and, since 1985, Cemento.

In late 1981, Mihanovich released the single "Puerto Pollensa", a song written by singer and actress Marilina Ross, who had recently returned to Argentina after being forced into exile with the onset of the dictatorship in 1976. The song was a commercial success, and was included as the title track of an also successful self-titled studio album, released in June 1982. That year, the outbreak of the Falklands War led the military government to ban music in English on radio stations, which greatly benefited local Spanish-language musicians, including Mihanovich. In late 1982, she became the first woman to perform at the iconic Obras Sanitarias stadium, known as "the cathedral of national rock". Mihanovich's album included a track written by Carballo, "Es la vida que me alcanza", which was a great boost for her career. The latter's debut studio album, Me vuelvo cada día más loca, was also released in 1982 and was an immediate success, going gold before hitting the stores.

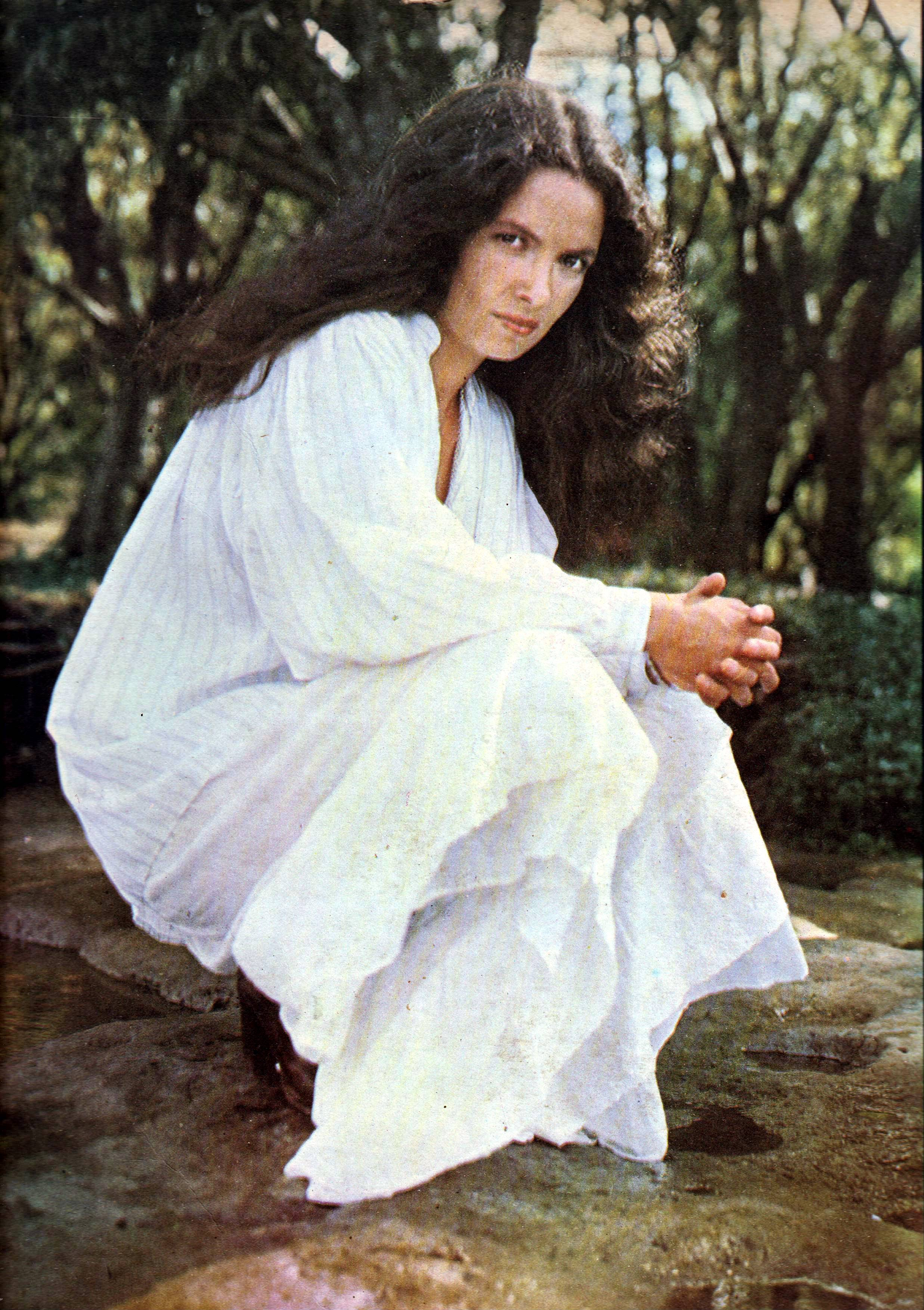
Mihanovich photographed for her 1982 self-titled album.

Although never explicitly, Mihanovich's "Puerto Pollensa" tells the story of a romantic encounter between two women, and became an enduring gay anthem, especially among the lesbian community, released at a time when the secrecy of non-heterosexual relationships was a source of shared codes and interpretations of cultural products. In 1983, after the dictatorship had collapsed and democratic elections were held, lesbian and gay life in Argentina flourished, with the opening of many bars and clubs that took advantage of the liberalization. Nevertheless, police raids, arbitrary arrests, persecutions and threats to gays, lesbians and travestis continued to be carried out by the new government, partly due to the fragility of the new democratic system against the power of the military and police apparatus during those years. As non-heterosexual women with careers unrelated to those of male artists, Carballo, Mihanovich and Ross differed from previous female Argentine rock acts (like María Rosa Yorio), and contributed to the visibility process that Argentine homosexuality was undergoing, although they refused to publicly address their sexual orientation. Mihanovich became a sex symbol for certain lesbians and a gay icon for the burgeoning Argentine gay culture, something that was further cemented with her 1984 Spanish-language cover of Gloria Gaynor's "I Am What I Am" (titled "Soy lo que soy"), which also became a gay anthem.

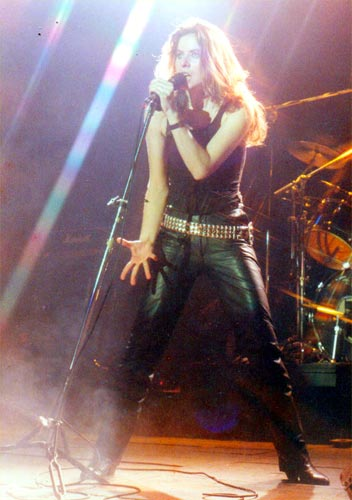
Celeste Carballo performing in 1987.

In the summer of 1987, Carballo joined Mihanovich and writer Ludovica Squirru in a poetry-musical show that was very successful, titled Sandra, Celeste y yo. It premiered at the Teatro Alberdi in Mar del Plata and remained on the bill throughout the summer. Once the theatrical season was over, Carballo and Mihanovich decided to extend their collaboration and record an album as a musical duo. This meant a stylistic change in both of their careers, as Carballo had previously explored genres like blues, punk and jazz rock, while Mihanovich was known for soft ballads. The duo approached producer Jorge Álvarez, who was the artistic director of RCA Records at the time, who initially distrusted that they could combine their styles.

In 1988, RCA released Mihanovich and Carballo's debut studio album as a duo, Somos mucho más que dos, to great commercial success. Around this time, the singers were romantically involved, albeit not openly, causing much media speculation. Nevertheless, the lyrics of Somos mucho más que dos have been interpreted as hints towards lesbian love, like those of album opener "Sabemos que no es fácil": "You and me, you and me / We are starting to be you and me / You and me, you and me / We know it's not easy to be you and me" (Spanish: "Vos y yo, vos y yo / Estamos empezando a ser vos y yo / Vos y yo, vos y yo / Sabemos que no es fácil ser vos y yo"). Likewise, in "Están los recuerdos", Carballo sings: "My childhood was sheltered in time / And I lived my adolescence in silence / Because love was a dream / That I hid with fear / And the future the miracle / That got me out of the secret" (Spanish: "Mi infancia quedó resguardada en el tiempo / Y a mi adolescencia la viví en silencio / Porque el amor era un sueño / Que escondía con miedo / Y el futuro el milagro / Que me sacó del secreto").

== Production and composition ==
Mujer contra mujer was recorded between December 1989 and March 1990 in Panda and Del Cielito studios in Buenos Aires. It featured a wide array of collaborators, including Pedro Aznar, Fito Páez, Andrés Calamaro, Tweety González, Pappo, Charly Alberti and María Gabriela Epumer. The album included four tracks written by Carballo, one by Páez, one by Calamaro and one by Aznar and Jorge Lencina, as well as four cover versions: Orquesta Mondragón's "Corazón de neón", María Elena Walsh's "Barco quieto" and Mecano's "Mujer contra mujer", the title track. Mujer contra mujer was produced by Carballo, Aznar, Páez, Calamaro, González, Lito Epumer, Maleta de Loca (duo formed by Epumer alongside Claudia Sinesi), Paul Dourge and Ulises Butrón.

In Mujer contra mujer, Mihanovich and Carballo adopted a more rock sound compared to their previous album Somos mucho más que dos. Comparing both albums in 2017, Mihanovich said: "The first record was perhaps more jazzy, the second had more of a rock edge, but ultimately I think that both albums were the product of two performers with very different personalities who came together in the same musical project, and I think that was really rewarding and interesting from an artistic point of view. The sum of individualities that generated something that is not 'Sandra' and is not 'Celeste', but rather 'Sandra and Celeste'." Diego Gez of Tiempo Argentino defined the duo's musical style as "melodic and subtle pop rock".

"Mujer contra mujer"
The album's title track—a version of a Mecano song—tells a love story between two women.

According to Julieta Pollo of La Tinta, Mujer contra mujer is composed of love songs between women and has lesbian visibility as its main concept. Likewise, Daniel Riera of Big Bang! News felt that the album was presented as a "kind of lesbian manifesto, absolutely liberating for its time." The title track speaks openly of a romantic relationship between two women, with the lyrics: "There is nothing special / About two women holding hands / What's special comes later / When they do it under the tablecloth" (Spanish: "Nada tienen de especial / Dos mujeres que se dan la mano / Lo especial viene después / Cuando lo hacen debajo del mantel"); and "A love to conceal / Although in dreams there is nowhere to hide it / They disguise it as friendship / When they go out for a walk in the city" (Spanish: "Un amor por ocultar / Aunque en sueños no hay donde esconderlo / Lo disfrazan de amistad / Cuando salen a pasear por la ciudad"). "Karmático" has been related to Carballo's brief approach to the feminist movement in the 1980s, featuring the closing lyrics: "If this is a world of men / Don't expect to see me adequate" (Spanish: "Si este es un mundo de hombres / No esperen verme adecuada").

== Release and impact ==
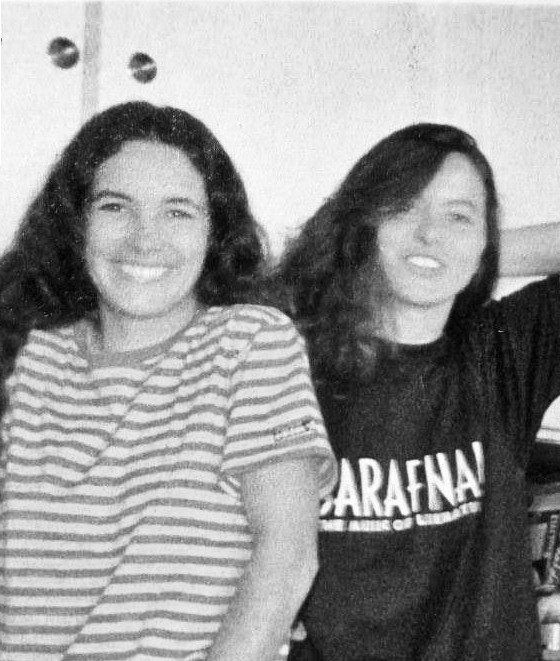
Mihanovich and Carballo photographed for a magazine interview, c. 1990.

Mujer contra mujer was released by RCA Records and Sony BMG in October 1990, and was a big commercial success. The album's famous cover art was designed by Andy Cherniavsky and Gabriel Rocca, and photographed by the latter. Going with the album's theme of lesbian love, it is a medium shot of both singers naked to the chest and embracing, with Carballo's lips close to Mihanovich's face, suggesting a kiss. The album cover, accompanied by the suggestive title, is considered a bold and transgressive move for the time. The photograph chosen for the back cover is even more explicit. In 2008, Paula Jiménez of Página/12 described the cover as "eloquent, impressive and unprecedented". According to Gez, Mujer contra mujer was quickly embraced by the gay community of Buenos Aires, transforming over the years into a symbol for the entire LGBT community in the country. The singers cemented their status as gay icons. In 2004, writer Mariana Enríquez noted that, as lesbian icons, Mihanovich and Carballo were "so necessary in a country where such visibility did not exist".

The press and promotion of the album were carried out by María Watson. Mujer contra mujer is widely remembered for a promotional campaign in which the city of Buenos Aires was wallpapered with large posters featuring its cover photograph. The suggestive image was controversial, and is now celebrated as a landmark in lesbian visibility in Argentina. In a 2019 radio program, Mihanovich recalled: "What we did was beautiful. My jaw dropped when I saw the Mujer contra mujer poster on the street. It is one thing to see the photo in the studio and quite another to come across [large] posters. It was a scandal! But, at the same time, I think it was very harmonic, very beautiful and it was something very successful aesthetically. Gabriel Rocca, the person in charge, is a great photographer. I am proud to have gone through all these things, but I confess that I am not as brave as I seem. I think I've gone through all those places almost without realizing it, like when you dive into a pool..."

In 2021, Rocca reflected on the photograph's conception and impact:

It wasn't conceived with what later happened in mind. It's a cover about the love between two women; I decided to photograph them that way, with that color palette. We never imagined the strong connotations it would carry, or that outdoor advertising companies would refuse to post the billboard, or everything that came afterwards. We never thought about it or did it expecting that reaction. Today you look at it and it's a simple, innocent cover, but at the time it was a scandal. Some people embraced it, and many rejected it. Talking about it now feels prehistoric: it's the love between two women, and back then people were horrified by anything gay. It simply didn't exist for society, and that's why it hit so hard. For me it was a banner of liberation, of saying 'Here we are, this is the music we make, this is what matters', and I created that image, but to me, it's just a cover about love."

With Mujer contra mujer, Mihanovich and Carballo helped install the discussion of lesbianism on the mostly conservative Argentine television. The duo famously performed the title track in Susana Giménez' eponymous talk show, where they got very close to each other to share a microphone after one of them suddenly stopped working, while singing a song that explicitly dealt with love between women. Martín Graziano of La Nación described this performance as "one of the great moments of Argentine popular culture," while Adrián Melo of Página/12 felt that Mihanovich and Carballo were "so subversive that it was moving."

When the duo promoted the album on Juan Alberto Badía's program Imagen de Radio, Carballo spoke openly about being a homosexual for the first time and confessed her love for Mihanovich. Jiménez considered this coming out to be a landmark for Argentine lesbians and noted its impact: "[Carballo's] confession was unprecedented in the memory of a country still inexperienced in fairly basic matters. In the 1970s, the filmic suggestion that La Raulito was a lesbian had served to reinforce the identification of homosexuality with misfortune. This was not the case: Celeste looked great." Near the end of the interview, the singer also criticized the treatment of Argentine society towards homosexuality, stating:

There are many people like me, (...) and they are among us. And there are many who keep their mouths shut and do not speak and hide. And there are many girls who paint their nails and it bothers them at night. (...) I understand that people are scared and feel rejection, but it does not seem normal and natural to me that I always have to speak with second words and never use the correct one because then... I continue to attack this prudish and macho society that Argentina really is.

In his 1997 chronicle "Biblia rosa y sin estrellas" (La balada del rock homosexual)—in which he explored the relationship between homosexuality and rock music—Chilean writer Pedro Lemebel wrote on the singers' impact:

... the lesbian couple of Celeste Carvallo (sic) and Sandra Mihanovich had a tremendous hit with their forbidden love. All of Argentina knew something, it was rumored that they were seen at the [pride parade], holding hands. They are very close friends. But they are such friends that they kiss each other on the mouth when they sing "Soy lo que soy" together. Then came the scandal, and Celeste's declarations of love for Sandra and all of Buenos Aires found out that the rocker and the balladeer slept together. Even Sandra's mother appeared on television saying: It's just that they both like the same music. Hey, the girls love each other so much. Thus, this tortilla (Note: Tortillera or tortilla are slurs used in several Spanish-speaking countries to refer to lesbian women, which have been reappropiated by the community.) rock that shook the cultural environment of Buenos Aires put an accent on the rock bible that favors so much the "strong" sex. Perhaps, before meeting Celeste, Sandra Mihanovich passed for a femme balladeer of the popular song. On the other hand, Carvallo, the friend of all the underground hippies, the Argentine Janis Joplin, the blues girl who is well-known for her psychedelic guitar playing.

Nevertheless, seeing that the media focused excessively on their relationship, Carballo and Mihanovich decided not to talk about their sexual orientation again, moving away from the idea of belonging to a political movement. In 1990, they returned to Imagen de Radio and announced their disbandment as a music duo, with Mihanovich stating: "We are singers, we live to sing, and we sing for a living, we will continue to do it together or separately or with other people." After that, they successfully returned to their solo careers and have remained friends. Despite the fact that Carballo confirmed that they had been a couple in Imagen de Radio, and that it was an open secret, Mihanovich never publicly acknowledged her homosexuality until 2012, when she announced that she had formed a family with another woman. She told La Capital in 2019: "I've had the fortune to say what I thought, what I felt, I had a consistent attitude for many years, (...) I haven't been a great activist, I don't feel like an activist. I do feel that I was choosing songs and saying things that I felt and that this coincided with the feelings of many others. So I opened doors for me and opened doors for others as well. What more can one ask for."

== Legacy ==
"[Mujer contra mujer was] an outburst typical of convulsive years, of the end of a decade, that of the '80s, which called for, at least, attitude. And anyone who was a teenager then knows that the attitude those girls had was more challenging than any other taken by fleeting rock stars. How can we describe what that kick to the closet meant without appealing to our own memory? Also for those who didn't even dream that being a lesbian was possible, for those who fantasized, for those who fantasized but made an effort to have a boyfriend, for the gays from the provinces, for those from the city, for those who were alone, for those who couldn't read between the lines in Virus' lyrics or Freddie Mercury's drag attitude."

— Lesbian feminist journalist and activist Marta Dillon, Página/12, 2009.

Over the years, the release of Mujer contra mujer has been revalued as a turning point in lesbian visibility in Argentine society, and is regarded by the local LGBT community as a breakthrough in the fight to break societal taboos. In his 2004 book on the history of homosexuality in Argentina, writer Osvaldo Bazán felt that regardless of whether the singers disclosed their sexual orientation or not, they were a "contribution of enormous courage in years when police raids were still common." In 2009, lesbian feminist journalist and activist Marta Dillon described it as the "most resounding coming out than anyone can remember."

In a 2019 interview, Chilean pop singer-songwriter Javiera Mena mentioned Mihanovich and Carballo and their version of "Mujer contra mujer" when asked about her "lesbian references in music." On the occasion of the album's 30th anniversary, Argentine singer-songwriter Cam Bezkin felt: "As a musician and a lesbian, it marked me, although perhaps not directly. I still believe that it left us a less rough path for those of us who came much later. It is a very brave album today. To the society of the LGBTQ collective and to many others it gave subtle encouragement. The shock produced by the album is now decidedly historic."

In 2020, on the occasion of the 30 years of the release of Mujer contra mujer, several media outlets published articles focused on its legacy. Writing for Uruguayan newspaper Brecha, Inés Acosta reflected on the album's artwork: "I try to imagine what it was like to produce such a political photograph in the 1990s, so challenging in times of secrecy, when lesbians either didn't exist or did so in a very negative way for the rest of the world. However, there they were, illustrating the vinyl cover. Together. Naked. Woman against woman." Gez described Mujer contra mujer as a "symbol of freedom and pride that transcended its time."

In 2020, Martín Graziano of La Nación included Mujer contra mujer in his list of "great conjugal albums". On March 7, 2021—the Day of Lesbian Visibility in Argentina—the Centro Cultural Kirchner (CCK) held a show in tribute to the anniversary of the release of Mujer contra mujer, which was broadcast online and featured different lesbian musicians covering its songs. The CCK described it as "the emblematic album of the Argentine lesbian community, the one that put lesbians at the center of the music scene and sang, bluntly, to the love between two women." Also in 2021, the cover photograph by Gabriel Rocca was displayed as part of the exhibition Rocca & Roll, a retrospective focused on his career that took place in an open-air gallery at the Plaza de las Naciones Unidas and the Eduardo Sívori Museum, Buenos Aires.

== Track listing ==
Side one
No.	Title	Writer(s)	Producer(s)	Length
1.	"Corazón de neón"	Joaquín Sabina; Javier Gurruchaga	Ulises Butrón	3:43
2.	"Amelia por los caminos"	Celeste Carballo	Maleta de Loca; Carballo	4:04
3.	"Una sola vez"	Andrés Calamaro	Calamaro	3:28
4.	"Karmático"	Carballo	Pedro Aznar	4:06
5.	"Un sueño profundo"	Carballo	Tweety González	3:31
Total length:				18:52

Side two
No.	Title	Writer(s)	Producer(s)	Length
1.	"Mujer contra mujer"	José María Cano	Fito Páez	3:48
2.	"Yo prefiero solo amarte"	Fito Páez	Paul Dourge	3:58
3.	"Sin Margarita Yourcenar"	Carballo	Carballo	4:30
4.	"Seré tu libertad"	Aznar; Jorge Lencina	Aznar	4:25
5.	"Barco quieto"	María Elena Walsh	Lito Epumer	3:33
Total length:				20:14

== Personnel ==
Credits adapted from Mujer contra mujer's liner notes and Mihanovich's official website.

=== Musicians ===
- Celeste Carballo – general production, lead vocals, background vocals, guitar on "Amelia por los caminos", piano on "Sin Margarita Yourcenar"
- Sandra Mihanovich – lead vocals, background vocals
- Mariano López – recording and mixing
- Charly Alberti – drums on "Un sueño profundo"
- Daniel Ávila – drums on "Corazón de neón"
- Pedro Aznar – guitar, bass and keyboard on "Seré tu libertad"
- Ulises Butrón – background vocals on "Corazón de neón", "Amelia por los caminos", guitar on "Un sueño profundo"
- Andrés Calamaro – guitar, bass, keyboard and background vocals on "Una sola vez"
- Lito Epumer – guitar on "Barco quieto"
- María Gabriela Epumer – background vocals on "Corazón de neón" and "Amelia por los caminos"; guitar on "Amelia por los caminos"
- Fabián García – keyboard on "Amelia por los caminos"
- Tweety González – keyboard on "Un sueño profundo"
- Aníbal Lo – drums on "Amelia por los caminos"
- Jota Morelli – drums on "Una sola vez", "Karmático", "Sin Margarita Yourcenar" and "Seré tu libertad"
- Fito Páez – piano, keyboard, bass and electronic drum programming on "Mujer contra mujer"
- Pappo – guitar on "Sin Margarita Yourcenar"
- Ricky Sáenz Peña – bass on "Corazón de neón"
- Claudia Sinesi – bass on "Amelia por los caminos"
- Stable Choir of the Universidad Argentina John F. Kennedy, directed by Raúl Frische – background vocals on "Karmático"
- Guillermo Vadalá – bass on "Un sueño profundo"

=== Artwork ===
- Gabriel Rocca – photography and cover art design
- Cristian Banchig – production and makeup
- Andy Cherniavsky – cover art design
- Gabriel Grippo – letters design

== See also ==
- 1990 in Argentina
- 1990 in Latin music
- Lesbian erotica
- LGBT music
- Media portrayal of lesbianism
- Women in Argentina
