= Andrea Álvarez (musician) =

Argentine musician (born 1962)

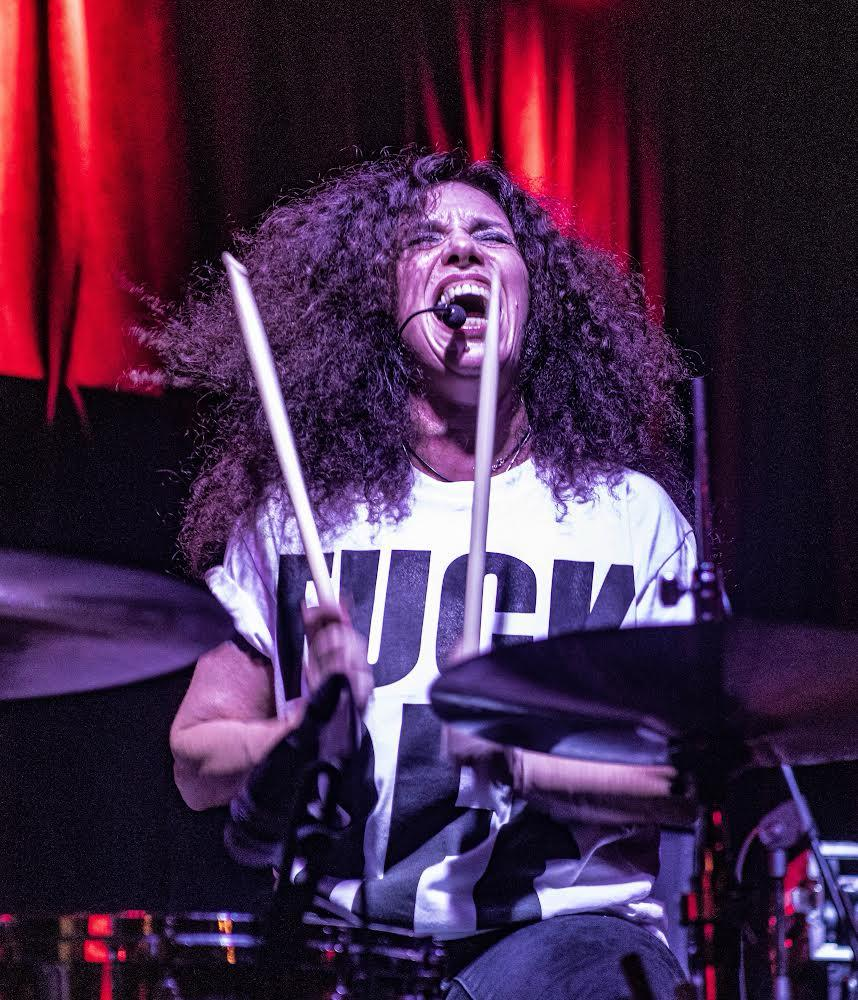
- Andrea Álvarez 2024

Background information
- Born: Andrea Julia Álvarez; May 23, 1962 (age 64); Buenos Aires, Argentina
- Genres: Rock, alternative rock
- Occupations: Songwriter, drummer, singer
- Instruments: Drums, percussion, vocals
- Formerly of: Soda Stereo, Divididos
- Spouses: Leonardo De Cecco (m. 1994; div. 2001); Lonnie Hillyer (m. 2011)
- Children: Pablo De Cecco

Andrea Álvarez (Buenos Aires; May 23, 1962) is an Argentine musician (drummer, percussionist, singer and composer). She was part of Rouge, the first all female Argentine rock band, and accompanied many nationally and internationally renowned artists.

At the end of the 1990s, she pursued her own projects. First, with the group Pulsomadre, and from 2001, as a solo artist releasing four studio albums, a live CD/DVD, and two EPs. Andrea was presented the Konex Award for "Best Female Rock Artist Of The Decade", and, in 2016 she was nominated by the Latin Grammy Awards for Best Rock Album for Y Lo Dejamos Venir.

== Career ==
=== Rouge and the beginnings ===
Andrea Álvarez is a pioneer among the female drummers in Argentina, and the first to pursue a career as a professional drummer. She was a member of Rouge (replacing Mari Sánchez), along with Claudia Sinesi, María Gabriela Epumer and Ana Crotti. Rouge was the first rock band in Argentina formed entirely by women, who played their own songs. Its dissolution gave way to the band Viuda e Hijas de Roque Enroll.

She collaborated with many national artists and bands such as Soda Stereo, Divididos (both as a substitute drummer and percussionist), Charly García, David Lebón, Celeste Carballo, Lito Vitale, Juan Carlos Baglietto, Memphis la Blusera, Los Rodríguez, Patricia Sosa, Marcela Morelo, Attaque 77, Alejandro Lerner, Los Tipitos, and Natalia Oreiro. In addition, she has worked with international artists such as Celia Cruz, Tito Puente and Alex Acuña and Draco Rosa.

=== With Soda Stereo ===
Among all her collaborations, the most remembered was as a percussionist for Soda Stereo for three years, including the recording of three of their albums (Languis, Canción Animal, and Rex Mix), tours, participation in their farewell shows and the Me Verás Volver Tour, and playing in replacement of Charly Alberti at CAPIF's Personality of the Year 2008 event.

=== Soloist ===
At the end of the 90s, Andrea Álvarez began to produce her own music, first with the Pulsomadre project (a percussion ensemble composed by all women), then subsequently, on her own. Since that time as a solo artist, she has released four studio albums, two EPs and a live CD/DVD. In 2013, she produced a series of bass and drum instructional videos for YouTube with Lonnie Hillyer as "Lonnie Hillyer's Grooves". In 2015 she received a Konex Award for "Best Female Rock Artist Of The Decade", together with five other Argentine female soloists.

In 2016, she was a member of the jury for the popular TV show Rock del país, hosted by Bebe Contepomi and broadcast on channel TN (Todo Noticias), and played as a regular drummer in the band of the popular actress and singer Natalia Oreiro, with whom she toured Argentina, Uruguay, and Russia. She is also the ambassador in Argentina for the international women's drum competition "Hit Like a Girl".

==== Andrea Álvarez and Entre caníbales ====
From the year 2000 (and some creative collaboration with Producer, Emilio Haro) she begins to give shape to what was her first solo album, self titled, Andrea Álvarez. It features the participation of Gustavo Cerati, Erica García and Zeta Bosio, among others. Álvarez was in charge of the direction, the percussion arrangements and the voices, as well as the composition of the songs. In 2003, she recorded an EP, "Entre Caníbales", also Produced by Emilio Haro, for which was edited and distributed by Pop Art.

==== ¿Dormís? ====
Again in company of Emilio Haro in the production but already with the participation of Mauro Quintero, and Franco Fontanarrosa in the arrangements, 2006 is the year of the release of Dormís? edited by Pirca Records and distributed by Universal Music. This second studio album was presented intensely to Buenos Aires and to the interior of Argentina in the following years.

==== Doble A ====
Andrea Álvarez enters 2008 with a new album: Doble A. This time, it is with her new band (Nano Casale on bass), and her former Producer, Emilio Haro, who participated in the arrangements. Álvarez calls Jim Diamond, well known American Producer from Detroit, Michigan, to give shape to a more raw and visceral record. It is recorded in ION studios and mixed and mastered in Ghetto Recorders by Diamond in Detroit.

Featuring guest guitarist and artist, Ricardo Mollo (of Divididos) and Richard Coleman, the album is edited by Pirca Records and distributed by Universal Music. The album's official presentation took place on April 16, 2009, at the Niceto Club hall in Buenos Aires, Argentina. In 2010 Doble A is released in Mexico, by the hand of Fonarte Latino.

Two years later, with her new band (bassist Lonnie Hillyer and guitarist León Peirone) with the participation of Mariano Martínez and Richard Coleman as guests, she edited her first DVD, Doble A en Vivo en Estudio ION, which can be downloaded for free from her website.

==== Y lo dejamos venir ====
In 2013 it launches the track "Se Pudre Todo". She recorded that version with Hillyer and Peirone, and posted it for free on her website. She also made a video clip for that version of the song.

In 2015 she independently releases her fourth album, Y Lo Dejamos Venir, with her band: Lonnie Hillyer on bass and Tomás Brugués on guitar. The production was led by Andrea and co-Produced Andrea Álvarez and Lonnie Hillyer which contains twelve songs most of which composed by Andrea, including the 2015 version of "Se Pudre Todo". The track from that album, "Se Pudre Todo", was also critically acclaimed and was featured in a show broadcast online at Vorterix.

In 2016, Y Lo Dejamos Venir was nominated for "Best Rock Album" by the Latin Grammy Awards. Álvarez and Hillyer traveled to Las Vegas for the ceremony and Andrea was interviewed by U.S. media.

That same year of 2016, Andrea released her second EP, Porque Sí, in which she along with her band, recorded and performed live rearranged versions four songs from her Andrea Álvarez and Dormís? albums. The video was recorded and shot live in El Pie Studios in Buenos Aires, Argentina. The Porque Sí video and tracks are now both available on digital format, including all most major platforms.

==== La cadena del mal ====
On July 26 of this year, Andrea Álvarez launched her fifth and latest album, La Cadena Del Mal, recorded in Panda Studios in Buenos Aires, Argentina in October and November 2023. The album was Produced by Andrea Alvarez, bassist Lonnie D. Hillyer, guitarist Tomi Brugués, and engineered and mixed by Christian Algarañaz. The album was mastered at Reveal Sound in London, England by Neil Pickles, who has also worked with artists such as Tool, Groove Armada, Basement Jaxx, Fun Lovin' Criminals, The Alabama Three, Kasabian, and The Buzzcocks, among others. The opening track, “Sos La Muerte del Rock”, was also accompanied with a video by music video Director, Sal Lencina. Both video and album were released on July 26, 2024. The album cover was photographed by renowned Argentine photographer and visual artist, Nora Lezano, who also provided multiple press photos from that same session. The album cover design is by Giselle Morello, also from Buenos Aires, Argentina.

== Discography ==
- Andrea Álvarez, 2001
- Entre caníbales (EP), 2003
- Dormís?, 2006
- Doble A, 2008
- Y lo dejamos venir, 2015
- Porque sí (EP), 2017
- Vamos viendo adonde está la libertad (sencillo), 2017
- La cadena del mal

== DVD ==
- Doble A en vivo en Estudio ION, 2010
