= Puerto Pollensa (song) =

1981 song written by Marilina Ross and first popularized by Sandra Mihanovich

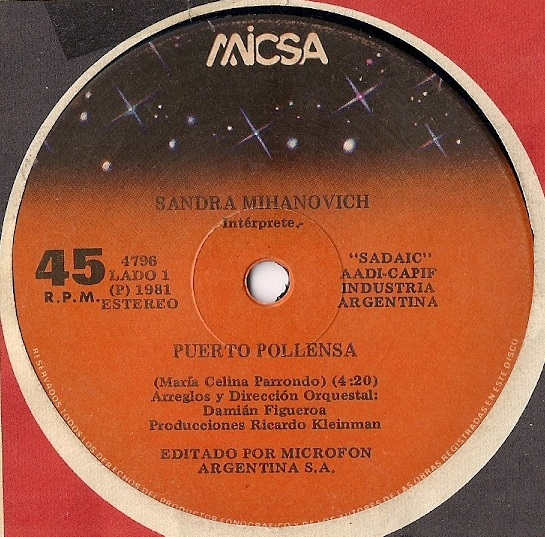

Single by Sandra Mihanovich

from the album Puerto Pollensa
- Language: Spanish
- B-side: "Simple"
- Released: 1981
- Studio: Estudios ION, Buenos Aires
- Genre: Pop
- Length: 4:20
- Label: MICSA (Microfón)
- Songwriter: Marilina Ross
- Producer: Ricardo Kleinman

"Puerto Pollensa" is a song written by Argentine singer-songwriter and actress Marilina Ross, first recorded and popularized by singer Sandra Mihanovich, who released it as a single in 1981 and later included it in her album of the same name, released in June 1982 on MICSA, a subsidiary of label Microfón. The lyrics of the song are autobiographical and tell a love affair that Marilina Ross had on the beaches of Puerto Pollensa, a town north of Mallorca in the Balearic Islands.

The ban on music in English imposed by the dictatorship during the Falklands War in 1982 greatly benefited the careers of Argentine popular musicians, among them Mihanovich and Ross. "Puerto Pollensa" received a lot of radio airplay and was a commercial success, reaching number one on Cashbox's Argentine single's chart in July 1982. This context also allowed Ross to sign a record deal with Discos CBS and release the album Soles that year, which included her own rendition of "Puerto Pollensa". Nevertheless, the dictatorship still prevented her from promoting the album on television or on public radio.

"Puerto Pollensa" is regarded as a quintessential gay anthem in Argentina and an icon of 1980s lesbian culture.

== Background ==
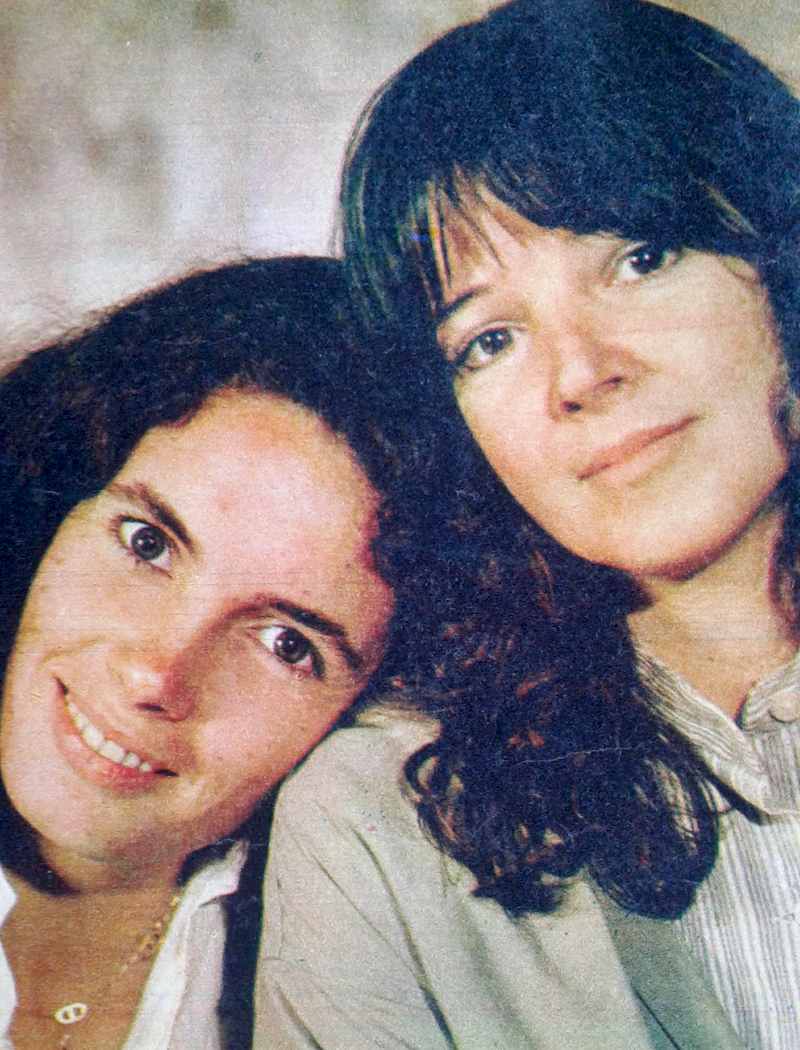
Sandra Mihanovich (left) and Marilina Ross (right) photographed in 1982.

Marilina Ross began her career as an actress in the 1960s and by 1975 was at her peak of popularity, thanks to her roles in Lautaro Murúa's acclaimed film La Raulito and the Alberto Migré-penned telenovela Piel naranja. The year before, she had made her debut as a recording artist with the album Estados de ánimo, fulfilling the "dream of her life". In 1976, a coup d'état installed the last civil-military dictatorship in Argentina, inaugurating a period of state terrorism known as the Dirty War. Due to her Peronist activism, Ross received death threats and was prohibited from continuing to work, so she had to leave the country at the height of her career. She went into exile in Spain, where she had several job offers due to the box office success of La Raulito. The estrangement from her loved ones and her country was very distressing for Ross, who defined the time in exile as the worst stage of her life.

In July 1980, Ross' friend and fellow actor Luis Politti died, who was also exiled in Madrid. According to her, he died of sadness, and she felt that she would be the next to die if she did not return to Argentina. Ross composed "Puerto Pollensa" just before returning to her home country, referring to a love affair she had in the town of the same name located north of Mallorca, in the Balearic Islands. She recorded it with her guitar on a cassette tape and gave it to her significant other, intended to be a personal gift and a "snapshot" of the moment they lived together. The recipient of the song is rumored to be the feminist writer Susana Torres Molina. Ross has said that the new love she found in Puerto Pollensa made her "climb out of the hole", and led her to return to Argentina, despite the fact that the dictatorship that had threatened her was still in power.

Ross and singer Sandra Mihanovich met in late 1980 through their mutual friend Alejandro Doria, who invited the latter to a party at Emilio Alfaro's house to welcome Ross back to the country. Ross and Alfaro had divorced years ago, but they were still friends and he hosted her as soon as she returned from exile. During the gathering, she performed the recently written "Puerto Pollensa" on her guitar for the guests and, upon hearing it, Mihanovich immediately asked her permission to record it. Ross initially flatly refused, as it was an intimate gift she had never thought to release, but agreed when she insisted. Ross told Página/12 in 2013: "The Sandra thing was key. And I was not even completely convinced by the song. I said: 'Oh, that chorus... how square it is!' I changed it, put other music on it, turned it over. It seemed to me that the music was very obvious, low quality, no? In the end it beat me, I couldn't change it and I left it as it was." Mihanovich was part of a new wave of musical acts that performed in a circuit of small bars centered in Buenos Aires, including Celeste Carballo, Horacio Fontova, Alejandro Lerner, La Torre and Rubén Rada. Since 1980, Mihanovich was a house act in Shams, a tea house turned pub in Belgrano that became an iconic venue of the 1980s.

== Composition ==
"Puerto Pollensa"
The final verse of the song, including the famous "chubby guy with glasses" lyrics, widely interpreted as the confirmation that it is a lesbian love story.

"Puerto Pollensa" is a love song that tells the story of two people that overcome the fear that prevented them from being together.

Although never explicitly, the lyrics subtly refer to a romantic encounter between two women, with some of the clues including the lyrics "Me nació este amor, sin que me diera cuenta yo/Tal vez el miedo no dejó que apareciera" (English: "This love was born without me realizing it/Maybe fear didn't let it appear") and the metaphor of a "seed that cannot see the light" (Spanish: "una semilla que no puede ver la luz"). What is commonly interpreted as the confirmation comes at the end of the song, with the oft-cited lyrics: "Y sin dormir nos fuimos a la playa y nos besamos descaradamente/Alucinando al gordito de gafas que fue corriendo a cambiarse los lentes" (English: "And without sleep we went to the beach and shamelessly kissed each other/Astounding the chubby guy that ran to change his glasses").

Ross has said that the lyrics in part refer to how she felt when assuming her sexual orientation, with lyrics that speak of "fear" and "panic", as well as the need to leave that behind. She explained: "At that time I was very consubstantial with the internal change. I thought the revolution had to go through your own head."

== Release and reception ==
"Puerto Pollensa" was first released as a 7-inch single by Sandra Mihanovich in late 1981 on MICSA, a subsidiary of label Microfón, along with the Alejandro Lerner-penned song "Simple" as its B-side. To avoid censorship, Marilina Ross was credited under her legal name María Celina Parrondo. "Puerto Pollensa" was included as the title track of Mihanovich's second studio album, released in June 1982.

The outbreak of the Falklands War on April 2, 1982 led the military government to ban music in English on radio stations, which made local Spanish-language music, especially the previously censored Argentine rock (known locally as rock nacional), expand to unprecedented limits. Mihanovich is said to have been "at the right time with the right record", releasing the album a week before the war ended.

"Puerto Pollensa" was a commercial success. In July 1982, it topped the Argentine singles chart reported by Prensario for Cashbox magazine. The Puerto Pollensa album had a lot of airplay on Argentine radio during 1982 and at the end of that year Mihanovich gave two massive concerts at the iconic Estadio Obras Sanitarias, becoming the first woman to perform in the venue known as "the cathedral of national rock".

Mihanovich has included live versions of the song on various albums, including Sandra en Shams (1985), Sandra en vivo (1998), and Creciendo: En vivo en el Ópera (2007).

== Marilina Ross version ==
"Puerto Pollensa"

Song by Marilina Ross

from the album Soles
- Released: 1982
- Length: 6:49
- Label: Discos CBS
- Producers: Piero; José Tcherkaski

The success of Ross' live performances, as well as the good reception of Mihanovich's version of "Puerto Pollensa", were attractive to record companies eager for new materials. The outbreak of war and consequent ban on music in English also fueled her musical career, allowing her to get a record deal. She recalled in 2011: "The Falklands War came, music was banned in English, and there I went from being prohibited to having three record labels vying for my presence. So I finally could choose between three labels to be able to record my songs! Thanks to a war, how terrible."

Her studio album Soles was released in November 1982 on Discos CBS and included her own version of "Puerto Pollensa", considered one of the highlights of the record. The album was produced by the songwriting duo Piero-José, formed by musicians Piero de Benedictis and José Tcherkaski. Ross presented Soles with three concerts held on November 26, 27 and 28 at the Teatro Odeón, a show in which she combined music with monologues, jointly written with Susana Torres Molina. Since the name Marilina Ross was technically still banned, the songs could only be played on private radio stations—Continental, Rivadavia or del Plata—and she was prevented from promoting Soles on television. To promote Soles, Discos CBS released "Puerto Pollensa" as a promotional single in Spain in 1984, with "Como mis padres" as its B-side.

== Legacy ==
"The success of 'Puerto Pollensa' lies in the fact that it is a very well told love song and many people felt represented beyond their sexual orientation. I always stayed out of the activist issues and sang what I wanted. My private life had a low profile and I find it wonderful that the songs have their own flight."

— Sandra Mihanovich, 2016

Considered the first Argentine popular song to thematize love between women, "Puerto Pollensa" became an enduring gay anthem, especially among the lesbian community, released at a time when the secrecy of non-heterosexual relationships was a source of shared codes and interpretations of cultural products. Journalist and activist Marta Dillon wrote in 2010 that "thirty years later lesbians of all ages continue singing the entire lyrics by heart".

The song had an important role in the process of visibility of homosexuality that took place in Argentina after the return to democratic rule in 1983.

Mihanovich has said that the song "served to make women love each other more".

Advertisements in the 1990s activist periodical La Hora Lésbica show the existence of lesbian bars named after the song in Buenos Aires.

Despite becoming icons of the burgeoning gay culture of 1980s Argentina, both Mihanovich and Ross refused to speak publicly about their non-heterosexuality for decades, although this was considered an open secret.

Nevertheless, Mihanovich has said on several occasions that she does not consider herself an LGBT activist. She told La Capital in 2019: "I have had the fortune to say what I thought, what I felt, I had the consistent attitude for many years, like more or less everything I could say I could do, I have not been a great activist, I do not feel like an activist. I do feel that I was choosing songs and saying things that I felt and that this coincided with the feelings of many others. So I opened doors for me and opened doors for others as well. What more can one ask for."

"Puerto Pollensa" is regarded as a classic. The Argentine edition of Rolling Stone and MTV ranked the song 83rd on their 2002 list of the "100 Hits of Argentine Rock".

In 2019, Chilean musician Javiera Mena mentioned Sandra Mihanovich and the song "Puerto Pollensa" when asked about her "lesbian role models in music".

== Usage in media and cover versions ==
"Puerto Pollensa" was featured in the 2002 hit television series Los simuladores as a favorite song of Martín Seefeld, a main character played by Gabriel David Medina.

Italian singer Iva Zanicchi covered "Puerto Pollensa" and included it as the closing track of her 1982 Spanish-language album Yo, por amarte. It was also recorded under the title "Renació este amor" by Puerto Rican singer Sophy in 1983, as part of her album Compárame. In 2017, the Argentine duo Ibiza Pareo released a cover version of the song.

== Charts ==
Chart (1982)	Peak position
Argentina (Cashbox)	1

== Personnel ==
Credits adapted from the liner notes of the album Puerto Pollensa.

- Sandra Mihanovich – vocals
- Ricardo Kleinman – producer
- Damián Figueroa – arrangement, orchestral conducting, guitar
- Iván Mihanovich – keyboards
- Enrique "Quique" Conte – bass
- Jorge "Cacho" Patrono – drums

== See also ==
- 1980s in Latin music
- 1981 in music
- 1982 in music
- LGBT music
- LGBT rights in Argentina
- Media portrayal of lesbianism
- Rock en español
- Women's music
