= Media portrayal of lesbians =

Lesbian portrayal in media is generally in relation to feminism, love and sexual relationships, marriage and parenting. Some writers have stated that lesbians have often been depicted as exploitative and unjustified plot devices. Common representations of lesbians in the media include butch or femme lesbians and lesbian parents. "Butch" lesbian comes from the idea of a lesbian expressing themselves as masculine by dressing masculine, behaving masculinely, or liking things that are deemed masculine, while "femme" lesbian comes from the idea of a lesbian expressing themselves as feminine by dressing feminine, behaving femininely, or liking things that are deemed feminine.

== Literature ==
Sappho was an ancient Greek poet who, over time, has become well known for her poetry fragments that frequently dealt with love between women. During the twentieth century, lesbians such as Gertrude Stein and Barbara Hammer were noted in the U.S. avant-garde art movements, along with figures such as Leontine Sagan in German pre-war cinema. Since the 1890s the underground classic The Songs of Bilitis has been influential on lesbian culture. This book provided a name for the first campaigning and cultural organization in the United States, the Daughters of Bilitis.

Joseph Sheridan le Fanu's 1872 novella Carmilla, published as part of the book In a Glass Darkly, is often cited as a root of the lesbian vampire trope about the predatory love of a vampire (the title character) for a young woman (the narrator) which was picked up in 20th-century exploitation films. The novella has since been adapted into a webseries, as well as a film based on the series.

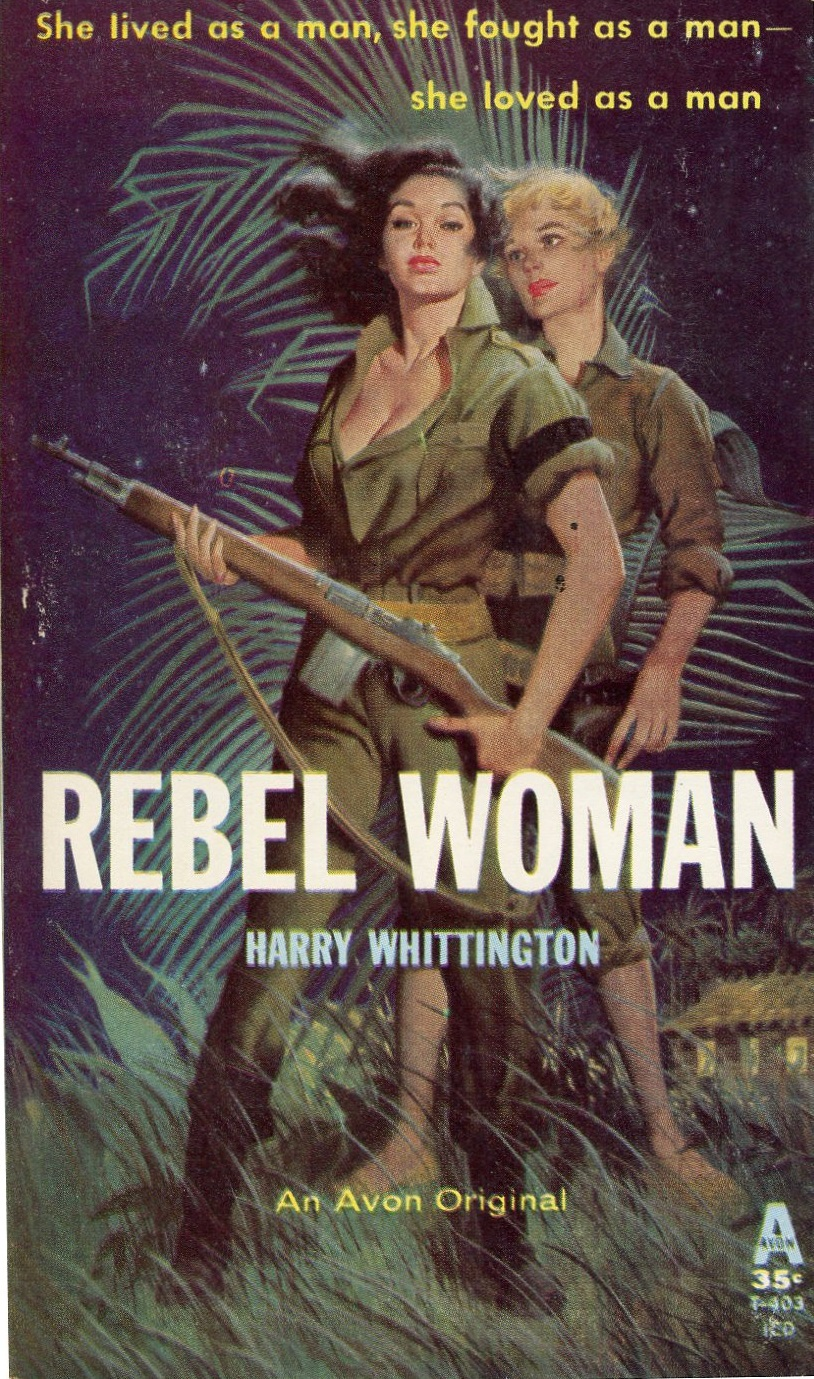
Rebel Woman, a lesbian pulp fiction novel from 1960

During the 1950s and 1960s, lesbian pulp fiction was published in the U.S. and the United Kingdom, often under "coded" titles such as Odd Girl Out, The Evil Friendship by Vin Packer and The Beebo Brinker Chronicles by Ann Bannon. British school stories also provided a haven for "coded" and sometimes outright lesbian fiction. During the 1970s the second wave of feminist-era lesbian novels became more politically oriented. Works often carried the explicit ideological messages of separatist feminism and the trend carried over to other lesbian arts. Rita Mae Brown's debut 1973 novel Rubyfruit Jungle was a milestone of this period; Patience and Sarah, by Isabel Miller, became a cult favorite. By the early 1990s, lesbian culture was being influenced by a younger generation who had not taken part in the "Feminist Sex Wars" and this strongly informed post-feminist queer theory along with the new queer culture. Molly Bolt in Rubyfruit Jungle has numerous romantic and sexual relationships with other women, and she confronts the "hypocrisies of both heterosexual and homosexual societies." In 1966, Renee LaRoche became the first "openly out Indigenous lesbian" in the detective novel Along the Journey River.

In 1972, the Berkeley, California lesbian journal Libera published a paper entitled "Heterosexuality in Women: its Causes and Cure". Written in deadpan, academic prose, closely paralleling previous psychiatry-journal articles on homosexuality among women, this paper inverted prevailing assumptions about what is normal and deviant or pathological. The paper was widely read by lesbian feminists. The journal is no longer published, and the article is nearly impossible to find: a Google search on the title typically yields Albert Ellis's book Homosexuality: its Causes and Cure, which was published before 1972, and before the American Psychiatric Association decided that homosexuality was no longer a mental disorder.

Happy Endings Are All Alike, in 1978, became the first novel with a "clearly lesbian main character," named Jaret Taylor who comes out in the book's first line.

Andrea Gibson, who gained fame in 2006 for their performances in multiple poetry slams, was a queer activist poet, who was open about their sexual identity and wrote often about their challenges and experiences as a queer person in their poems.

== Art ==
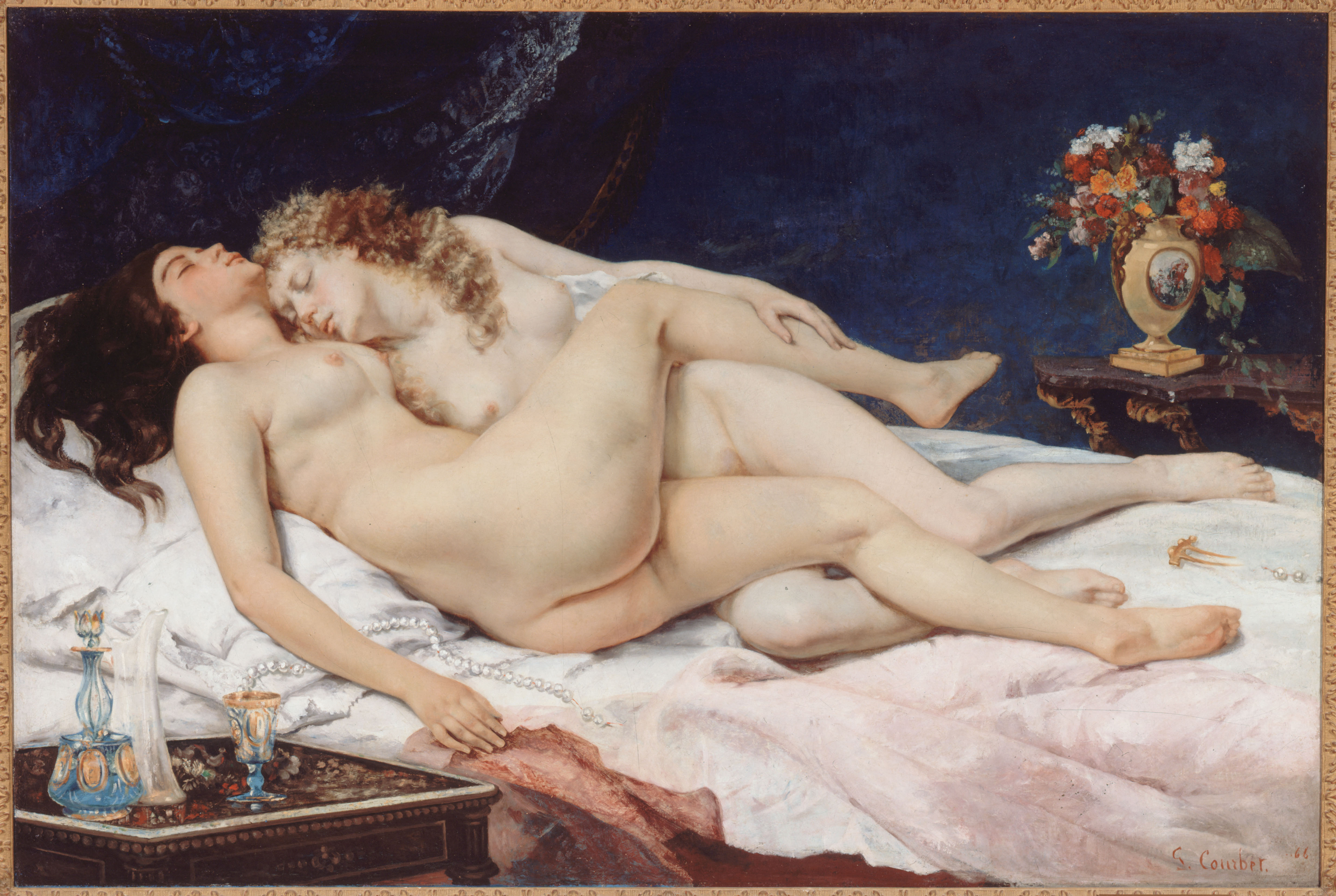
Le Sommeil (Sleep) by Gustave Courbet (1866)

In Art History, paintings showing two or more females together seldom displayed much in the way of potential sexual activity between them. When it came to nudity, most women subjects were depicted as dancers or bathers, usually stated as goddesses.

One well known painting from the 19th century is Gustave Courbet's Sleep which openly depicts two women asleep after love-making (indicated by the broken pearl necklace); and Dominique Ingres' Turkish Bath in which, in the foreground, one woman can be seen with an arm around another and pinching her breast. Both these paintings ended up in the collection of erotica collector and diplomat Khalil Bey, but are now exhibited in the Metropolitan Museum of Art and the Louvre, respectively.

Another work from the 19th century, Lysistrata haranguing the Athenian women (1896), by Aubrey Beardsley depicts a group of naked women, with one of them about to manually stimulate another.

More famous is Damned Women (c. 1885) by Auguste Rodin, which is a sculpture of two women in movement on top of one another.

== Music ==
This section gives examples of lesbian musicians, and few music videos that portray lesbian couples. See also Category:Lesbian musicians.

- Alix Dobkin
- Janis Ian
- Hayley Kiyoko
- Mikaela Straus, also known by the stage name King Princess
- Julia Nunes
- Indigo Girls
- Javiera Mena
- Sandra Mihanovich and Celeste Carballo
- Tegan and Sara, who are lesbian twin sisters that have gained much respect in the queer community
- Mary Lambert, who gained attention from her song She Keeps Me Warm

The 1981 Spanish-language hit single "Puerto Pollensa", written by Marilina Ross and popularized by Sandra Mihanovich, is considered the first Argentine popular song to thematize lesbian love, and is regarded as a quintessential gay anthem and an icon of 1980s lesbian culture in its home country. Mihanovich later formed a music duo with Celeste Carballo, who was also her partner. Although they never took an explicitly activist stance, they played a fundamental role in making lesbianism visible in South American popular culture.

The music video for The Head and the Heart's "Another Story" portrays a lesbian couple.

The music video for Bjork's "All Is Full of Love" depicts two lesbian robots kissing.

Other music videos:

- dodie's "Sick of Losing Soulmates"
- Halsey's "Ghost"
- Hayley Kiyoko's "Cliffs Edge"
- Hayley Kiyoko's "Girls Like Girls"

In 2019, Billboard compiled a list of the 30 lesbian love songs: Baum's "Hot Water", Gia Woods' "Only a Girl", Ames' "Flowers for Anna", Rina Sawayama's "Cherry", Asiahn's "Like You", King Princess' "Pussy Is God", Kelela's "Truth or Dare", Beatrice Eli's "Girls", Kehlani's "Honey", Alyson Stoner's "Fool", Keeana Kee's "You're Real", L Devine's "Daughter", Dizzy Fae's "Her", Studio Killers' "Jenny", Girl in Red's "I Wanna Be Your Girlfriend", Tegan and Sara's "Closer", Mary Lambert's "I'd Be Your Wife", Lucy Whittaker's "Curious", Janelle Monáe's "Make Me Feel", Zolita's "Like Heaven", Emily Burns' "Vanilla Sundae" (featuring Olivia Nelson), Hayley Kiyoko's "Girls Like Girls", Beth Ditto's "Love in Real Life", Halsey's "Strangers" (featuring Lauren Jauregui), Melissa Etheridge's "Come to My Window", Kodie Shane's "Sing to Her", k.d. lang's "Constant Craving", the Japanese House's "Lilo", LP's "Girls Go Wild", and Rita Ora's "Girls" (featuring Cardi B, Bebe Rexha, and Charli XCX).

== Opera and theater ==
Lesbian characters rarely appear in opera; Countess Geschwitz in Alban Berg's Lulu is one exception, but Charles Gounod's Sapho portrays the poet as straight. Patience and Sarah, based on the Isabel Miller novel, has been described as the first lesbian opera.

In theater, there are quite a few plays and musicals that have lesbian characters or focus on lesbian themes. One particular musical that has received a lot of recognition in the past few years is Fun Home. Based on the graphic novel of the same name, Fun Home is a personal account of Alison Bechdel's self-discovery as a lesbian. The show also features themes of the decision to come out, having sex for the first time, and coming to terms with one's sexuality. Many of the songs in the show focus on these themes, such as the moment of recognition one knows they are gay, when they find gay role models, and the awkwardness and authenticity that comes with first time sex. This show stands out because it normalizes the lesbian experience and speaks of lesbian sex without the fetishation found in much other media platforms.

== Cinema ==
The first lesbian-themed feature film was Mädchen in Uniform (1931), based on a novel by Christa Winsloe and directed by Leontine Sagan, tracing the story of a schoolgirl called Manuela von Meinhardis and her passionate love for a teacher, Fräulein von Bernburg. It was written and mostly directed by women. The impact of the film in Germany's lesbian clubs was overshadowed, however, by the cult following for The Blue Angel (1930).

Until the early 1990s, any notion of lesbian love in a film almost always required audiences to infer the relationships. The German silent film Pandora's Box (1929) is the first film to have a lesbian subplot, where a Countess (portrayed by Alice Roberts) is deeply infatuated with the protagonist Lulu (Louise Brooks). The lesbian aesthetic of Queen Christina (1933) with Greta Garbo has been widely noted, even though the film is not about lesbians. Alfred Hitchcock's Rebecca (1940), based on the novel by Daphne du Maurier, referred more or less overtly to lesbianism, but the two characters involved were not presented positively: Mrs. Danvers was portrayed as obsessed, neurotic and murderous, while the never-seen Rebecca was described as having been selfish, spiteful and doomed to die. All About Eve (1950) was originally written with the title character as a lesbian but this was very subtle in the final version, with the hint and message apparent to alert viewers.

Playwright Lillian Hellman's first play, The Children's Hour (1934) was produced on Broadway. Set in a private girls' boarding school, the headmistress and a teacher are the targets of a malicious whispering campaign of insinuation by a disgruntled schoolgirl. They soon face public accusations of having a lesbian relationship. The play was nominated for a Pulitzer prize, banned in Boston, London, and Chicago and had a record-breaking run of 691 consecutive performances in New York City. A 1961 screen adaptation starred Audrey Hepburn and Shirley MacLaine. The play's deep and pervasively dark themes and lesbian undertones have been widely noted. In 1968 The Killing of Sister George featured a lesbian love triangle.

In 1985, the film Desert Hearts was released, which was based on the novel Desert of the Heart by Jane Rule. This movie shows one of the first positive portrayals of lesbians in wide-screen films. Although when the main character Vivian first comes to town she knows nothing of being queer. In fact, she is there to stay because she is currently seeking a divorce with her husband. Upon arriving, she discovers Cay, who is known to the locals as a 'bad boy' type, save for the fact that she is a woman. From there Vivian and Cay establish a fairly unproblematic relationship together, though, in the end, Vivian must return home.

Mainstream films with openly lesbian content, sympathetic lesbian characters and lesbian leads began appearing during the 1990s. By 2000 some films portrayed characters exploring issues beyond their sexual orientation, reflecting a wider sense that lesbianism has to do with more than sexual desire.

Notable mainstream theatrical releases include Bound (1996), Chasing Amy (1997), Wild Things (1998), Kissing Jessica Stein (2001), Lost and Delirious (2001), Mulholland Drive (2001), Monster (2003), D.E.B.S (2004), Rent (2005, based on the Jonathan Larson musical), My Summer of Love (2004), Loving Annabelle (2006), and Imagine Me & You (2005). There have also been many non-English language lesbian films, such as Fire (India, 1996), Show Me Love (Sweden, 1998), Aimée & Jaguar (Germany, 1999), Blue (Japan, 2001), The Mars Canon (Japan, 2002), Blue Gate Crossing (Taiwan, 2004), Butterfly (Hong Kong, 2004), Love My Life (Japan, 2006), Les filles du botaniste (France/Canada, 2006), Portrait of a Lady on Fire (France, 2019).

The Watermelon Woman (1996) is a feature film directed and written by Cheryl Dunye that explores the history of black lesbians in film. Dunye's inspiration came from her frustration with the lack of information about black actresses in early films, which led her to create a fictional character named Fae Richards and construct an archive for her. The film's protagonist, Cheryl, is an aspiring black lesbian filmmaker who becomes fascinated with an actress listed only as "Watermelon Woman" in the credits of a movie called "Plantation Memories." Cheryl's journey highlights the difficulty of navigating archival sources that either exclude or ignore black queer women working in Hollywood. The film's title is a play on the 1970 film "The Watermelon Man" by Melvin Van Peebles. In 2016, the film was restored and re-released widely for its 20th anniversary and now resides in the permanent cinema collection at the Museum of Modern Art in New York City.

Speaking at the Bombay Academy of Moving Images, Nisha Ganatra revealed that Bend It Like Beckham was originally intended to have a more overt lesbian theme by Gurinder Chadha. Notably, Gurinder Chadha previously directed the film What's Cooking, which featured Julianna Margulies and Kyra Sedgwick as a lesbian couple. Chadha is claimed to have softened the lesbian angle, to a case of "crossed wires" and jokes like "Lesbian? Her birthday's in March. I thought she was a Pisces," to make the film more marketable - something which has not gone down well with all gay reviewers. However, Jess' male friend Tony was retained as a sympathetic gay character. Bend it like Beckham also won an award for "Outstanding Film" from the Gay & Lesbian Alliance Against Defamation

In 2013, Blue Is the Warmest Colour, a French drama film revolving around a romance between two women, was released. It won the Palme d'Or at the Cannes Film Festival, and numerous critics deemed the film to be the best of 2013. The film was noted for its explicit sex scenes, with Variety critic Justin Chang writing in his review of the film that it is marked by the most explosively graphic lesbian sex scenes in recent memory". The film has been criticized as being made for the male-gaze made sex scenes and being directed by a heterosexual cisgender male director.

In 2014, Pride came to the big screen as a film that followed the true story of a British LGBT group as they tried to raise money to help the efforts of the British miner's strike in 1984: the group's campaign would become known as Lesbians and Gays Support the Miners. The running joke within the Lesbians and Gays Support the Miners group is that the character Steph (Faye Marsay) is the one that makes up the "L" of LGSM, meaning that she is the only lesbian represented in the group - that is until the group comes across a lesbian couple (Stella (Karina Fernandez) and Zoe (Jessie Cave)) along their journey of supporting the miners and their families.

== Television and radio ==
Lesbian characters have made very rare appearances in scripted radio programs, almost always as killers or murder victims. The first lesbian on American radio was in an episode of the imported British crime anthology series The Black Museum entitled "The Brass Button". The character, Jeanette Morgan, was the episode's murder victim. She was described as "not interested in men" and "living that strange and unnatural kind of way". Jeanette was murdered by a soldier who, having heard gossip about her, makes sexual advances. When she rejects his advances towards her, he strangles her to death.

Early American television largely ignored lesbian women. Homosexuality was not discussed on television until the mid-1950s, and when it was discussed — usually on local talk shows — it was almost uniformly male homosexuality under discussion. It was not until 1962, when an episode of Confidential File covered the 1962 convention of the Daughters of Bilitis, that a national broadcast specifically covered lesbianism. Lesbians were explicitly excluded from the proposal for the country's first documentary broadcast on homosexuality, 1961's The Rejected, and from the first network documentary on homosexuality, "The Homosexuals", a 1967 instalment of CBS Reports. On scripted television, the earliest lesbian characters were "coded", like the villainous Miss Brant on The Asphalt Jungle (1961), a repressed lesbian who shoots girls on lovers' lane for making themselves available to boys, or neurotics like Hallie Lambert from a 1963 episode of The Eleventh Hour. After years during which the only portrayals of lesbians on television were negative, stereotypical, or both, NBC aired "Flowers of Evil" a 1974 episode of the series Police Woman. In it a trio of lesbians (described by Lesbian Tide magazine as "The Butch, The Bitch and The Femme") were robbing and murdering the elderly residents of the nursing home they ran. Lesbian activists operating under the name Lesbian Feminist Liberation staged a zap at NBC's New York City headquarters. Ten women entered the building and occupied it overnight. Around 75 women demonstrated in front of the building. The following morning protesters unfurled a twenty foot long banner from the balcony of vice president Herminio Traviesas's office reading "LESBIANS PROTEST NBC". They and street-level picketers chanted slogans like "NBC works against lesbians" and "Lesbians are sitting in".

The 1980s television series L.A. Law included a lesbian relationship which stirred much more controversy than lesbian TV characters would a decade later. The 1989 BBC mini series Oranges Are Not the Only Fruit was based on lesbian writer Jeanette Winterson's novel of the same title. In 1989, the relationship between Lorraine and Theresa "Tee" in the series The Women of Brewster Place became the first black lesbian relationship portrayed on American television. Russian pop-duo t.A.T.u were popular in Europe during the early 2000s, gaining wide attention and TV airplay for their pop videos because they were marketed as lesbians even though they were not.

Many science fiction series have featured lesbian characters. An episode of Babylon 5 featured an implied lesbian relationship between characters Talia Winters and Commander Susan Ivanova. Star Trek: Deep Space Nine featured a few episodes ("Rejoined") with elements of lesbianism that implied, but never stated, that in Star Trek's 24th century such relationships are accepted, even though the show never actually depicted one. Torchwood's first series involved brief lesbian encounters for both Gwen Cooper (Eve Myles) and Toshiko Sato (Naoko Mori), but in each instance alien intervention was responsible. AfterEllen reviewer Karman Klegroe criticises Torchwood's record on this score concluding that: "sexual tension between the male characters, particularly Captain Jack and Ianto, is standard fare, whereas the women have very few sexual interactions that aren't quickly explained away by alien circumstances". In the fourth series, recurring character Charlotte Willis (Marina Benedict) was eventually revealed to be a lesbian.

Actress and comedian Ellen DeGeneres came out publicly as a lesbian in 1997 and her character on the sitcom Ellen did likewise soon after during its fourth season, becoming one of "TV's first openly gay main characters," seen with a female lover named Laurie, in the show's final season before the show was cancelled. This was the first American sitcom with a lesbian lead character. The coming-out episode won an Emmy Award, but the series was cancelled after one more season. She then continued to be the star of two more television programs. The Ellen Show debuted on CBS in September 2001, and was cancelled before the end of the first season. In September 2003, NBC premiered The Ellen DeGeneres Show, a daytime talk show that has so far been successful. In all of these accounts, DeGeneres has performed a lesbian persona as a consumed character that corresponds to her true identity. She is among the first mass mediated lesbians in history. Because she is a TV personality, her position as an accessible, likeable lesbian, is unique to most portrayal of gay and lesbian actors or characters in media. Ellen DeGeneres is known for playful personality separate from her lesbian identity, where some of her only "lesbian identifiers" are seen to be her clothing style and her mention of her relationship with Portia de Rossi. Ellen was recently granted the Presidential Medal of Freedom, America's highest civilian honour, for her courage and her help pushing the country in a direction of justice by President Barack Obama.

In 2000, the ABC Daytime drama series All My Children character Bianca Montgomery (Eden Riegel) was revealed to be a lesbian. Though the storyline received significant praise from critics and viewers and spun two popular romances (Bianca Montgomery and Maggie Stone, Lena Kundera and Bianca Montgomery), it was also met with criticism for its almost perpetual trauma and Bianca's lack of a successful long-running romance with another woman. The character was later given a wife to combat this, in the pairing of Reese Williams and Bianca Montgomery, which became the first legal same-sex marriage in American daytime television, but this was also met with criticism; critics and fans reasoned that the storyline was underdeveloped and essentially failed in popularity.

Willow Rosenberg (Alyson Hannigan) and Tara Maclay's (Amber Benson) relationship in the supernatural series Buffy the Vampire Slayer (1997–2003) became one of the first prominent portrayals of a lesbian couple on American primetime television. The series also featured the first lesbian sex scene on American primetime television in 2003. Meanwhile, the relationship between Jessie Sammler (Evan Rachel Wood) and Katie Singer (Mischa Barton) on the ABC drama Once and Again (1999–2002) became the first teen lesbian romance depicted on network television.

Showtime's The L Word (2004–2009) is a drama focusing on the relationships of a group of lesbian and bisexual women, the first of its kind on television. The series is considered a turning point in the portrayal of lesbianism in American media, particularly for its portrayal of a queer community at a time when lesbian representation was often relegated to a single lesbian character amid an otherwise heterosexual cast. Another hallmark of the series was its graphic depiction of lesbian sex at a time when lesbian sex was "virtually invisible elsewhere on television." The success of The L Word led to several spinoffs, including a reality television series The Real L Word (2010–2012), the documentary film L Word Mississippi: Hate the Sin (2014), and a sequel television series, The L Word: Generation Q, which debuted on Showtime in December 2019.

Grey’s Anatomy (2005—2024) introduced Arizona Robbins in 2008, and Callie Torres, introduced 2006, is the longest running LGBTQ+ character on television. The two dated, married, and raised a child together, providing representation of a Queer family with two moms in 2010. The show didn't allow Callie and Arizona to fall into common lesbian and bisexual stereotypes, and Grey’s Anatomy is still praised for its LGBTQ+ representation.

The portrayal of lesbianism on television has continued to expand. Netflix's comedy-drama series Orange is the New Black (2013–2019) featured a significant number of non-heterosexual female characters, and has been praised for confronting many lesbian stereotypes throughout its run. The Canadian-American supernatural series Wynonna Earp (2016–2021) has also been praised for its refusal to allow its lesbian and bisexual characters to fall into common tropes.

=== The "lesbian kiss episode" ===
Mainstream American broadcast media have created a subgenre of lesbian portrayal in what is sometimes referred to as the "lesbian kiss episode", in which a lesbian or bisexual female character and a heterosexual-identified character kiss. In most instances, the potential of a relationship between the women does not survive past the episode and the lesbian character rarely appears again. The first of these was an episode titled "He's a Crowd", from the 1991 legal drama L.A. Law.

=== "Bury Your Gays" ===
In March 2016, The CW's dystopian science fiction series The 100 caused widespread controversy with its decision to kill off Lexa, a recurring lesbian character who was the leader of twelve clans and involved in a fledgling relationship with Clarke Griffin, the series' protagonist. Lexa's death after having sex with Clarke caused immediate outrage from the character's large LGBTQ fanbase, who saw it as contributing to a wider pattern commonly known as the "Bury Your Gays" trope.

Media increasingly weighed in on the death of the character and the harmful trope at play. Fans of The 100, as well as numerous other shows, united in expressing their anger and frustration with the perpetuation of the trope and the show's creator, Jason Rothenberg, causing him to issue a formal apology for his execution of Lexa's death. Fans called for writers and producers to acknowledge and consider the overwhelming history of dead lesbian and bisexual characters when mapping out their own characters' fates.

== Advertising ==
The Millennium has brought forth new types of modern advertising. There has been a shift towards highly sexualized and sexually explicit advertising materials in print, fashion, art, music, television, and movies. It would seem that most advertisements featuring two or more women have a negative context to them. They almost possess a soft-core pornographic theme to them.

Gill (2008) presents a shift in the representation of women by breaking advertising segments down into several different identities. Of them is the "hot lesbian". The "hot lesbian" identity portrays the fantasy of two or more lesbian women, whose physical appearance is considered "hot" according to conventional patriarchal beauty standards, engaging in "suggestive" lesbian behaviour, or explicit sexual activity. There are many notable examples of ads portraying hot lesbians in them (Canada Oil Sands, Versace clothing, Skyy Blue Vodka, Pornstar clothing, Nikon camera, American Apparel clothing, Calvin Klein products, Miller Light beer, etc.).

Sender (1999), Ingebretsen (1999), and Bhat et al. (1998) point out that there are advertisers who do use gay and lesbian models to promote directly to the gay and lesbian community, but wish to remain innocuous to heterosexuals. Gay and lesbian advertisers do not actively pursue national recognition (which is essentially to a much larger demographic of heterosexuals) mostly due to fear and criticism. However, some very notable corporations, such as "Sony, Toyota, Microsoft, Levi's, Banana Republic, American Express, Miller, and Absolut now commonly use gay media. Some firms (IKEA, Calvin Klein, Benetton) have gone further into using homosexual imagery in advertising to [appeal to] more general audiences". The gay and lesbian advertisers should be creating ads that appeal to all sexual preferences, even though this may be easier said than done. The gay and lesbian advertisers must go beyond their select audience for ad campaigns targeting gays and lesbians to look at the inclusion, instead of exclusion, of heterosexuals. Sender (1999) suggests that on the heterosexual side, "images which are arousing for lesbians, but which may not have originally been intended for [lesbians], may actually offer greater pleasure than those which are implicitly coded to suggest a lesbian reading". If such is the case for "hot lesbian" advertisements, then there is nothing to say that actual lesbian advertisements might find heterosexuals left wanting something as well from them.

Academics such as Diamond (2005) Wirthlin (2009) take exception to the role of "hot lesbian" in advertisements, and what has turned lesbianism into a commodity. As Diamond (2005) states, "media representations signal a new appreciation and celebration of women's sexual freedom and diversity. On the other hand this is not necessarily the case...by portraying it as a fashionable 'add on' to otherwise conventional heterosexuality" (p. 105). They argue that women view these advertisements and images as a true reflection of what it is to be lesbian, thus making it much harder for real lesbians to acknowledge their sexuality. Furthermore, Wirthlin (2009) points out that, "In order to resist this we must first recognize the ubiquitous presence of "fad" lesbian images and then problematize their use in popular culture. Next, there needs to be an active resistance against these images through counterculture advertisements and the performative act of resistance, such as through the act of writing as oneself, by utilizing multiple voices and subjectivities" (p. 113). In both academics view, lesbian or bi-sexual women must be sure of what media means to them, and call into question things that do not appear "authentic". Lesbians must also be educated on the topic of the "hot lesbian", and ensure they do not fall into the "heteronormative appropriation" of advertising's effects.

Jhally (1989) and Jackson (2009) on the other hand do not see the portrayal of women being objectified as a commodity or "hot lesbians" necessarily wrong. Not in the literal sense, but advertisements are reflective of what our views are. In turn, this may open up women who were unsure of their sexuality (even though most lesbians would state that they were lesbians from birth) and let them experiment without the boundaries. As an example, older advertisements from the 1940s, 1950s, and 1960s are made up of ideologies of what men wanted, and what they believed to be their ultimate dreams. Those ads supposedly portrayed what women dreamed about, when really this was only because they were being told what to dream about by men. Women were just heterosexual in everyone's eyes, as being lesbian was a major taboo during that time. Lesbians were always in the background, just not front-and-centre. Nowadays, you have postfeminist women who want to be free from labels, experiment sexually, and use fashionable lesbianism in advertising as it does not affect their heterosexual ways. It has become a "fad", or "cool" to be bi-curious, or tri-sexual. This, in turn, may open up other avenues for women who were once shunned upon. Sexuality and gender have been elevated to a privileged position in our cultural discourse, and thus powerful media campaigns only further this cause. It is natural that the "hot lesbian" would be at the forefront because sex always sells, and the "hot lesbian" theme in advertising is what is taking place now. As such, people can view the advertisements as just advertisements, or it can pique their curiosity.

== Comics and graphic novels ==
For much of the 20th century, gay relationships were discouraged from being shown in comics which were seen mainly as directed towards children. Artists had to drop subtle hints while not stating directly a character's orientation. An example was in the 1938-39 edition of Milton Caniff's Terry and the Pirates: one of the main villains, Sanjak, has been interpreted by some as a lesbian with designs on the hero's girlfriend, though this is not openly stated. Further, some writers and others (notably Chris Rock on Saturday Night Live) have commented that the Peanuts character Peppermint Patty is a lesbian (and inferred a relationship with her close friend Marcie, although such an inference was never supported by the comic strip's content). (Peppermint Patties has been used as a pejorative slang word for lesbians.)

LGBTQ themes and characters were historically omitted intentionally from the content of comic strips and comic books, due to either censorship, the perception that LGBT representation was inappropriate for children, or the perception that comics as a medium were for children. In the 1950s, American comic books, under the Comics Code Authority, adopted the Comic Code which, under the guise of preventing "perversion", largely prevented the presentation of LGBT characters for a number of decades. Until 1989 the Comics Code Authority, which imposed de facto censorship on comics sold through newsstands in the United States, forbade any suggestion of homosexuality. Overt lesbian themes were first found in underground and alternative titles which did not carry the Authority's seal of approval. The first comic with an openly lesbian character was "Sandy Comes Out" by Trina Robbins, published in the anthology Wimmen's Comix #1 in 1972.

Gay Comix (1980) included stories by and about lesbians and by 1985 the influential alternative title Love and Rockets had revealed a relationship between two major characters, Maggie and Hopey. Meanwhile, mainstream publishers were more reticent. A relationship between the female Marvel Comics characters Mystique and Destiny was only implied at first, then cryptically confirmed in 1990 through the use of the archaic word leman, meaning a lover or sweetheart. Only in 2001 was Destiny referred to in plain language as Mystique's lover. Previously, WildStorm's Image Comics had featured Sarah Rainmaker of Gen^{13} as a character with an interest in other women, and had openly depicted homosexual relationships between the members of the Authority, such as Jenny Sparks and Swift.

In recent years, the number of lesbian characters in mainstream comics has increased greatly due to the large number of openly gay and lesbian comic creators that self-publish their work on the internet. These include amateur works, as well as more "mainstream" works, such as Kyle's Bed & Breakfast. According to Andrew Wheeler from ComicsAlliance, webcomics "provide a platform to so many queer voices that might otherwise go undiscovered." In 2006, DC Comics could still draw widespread media attention by announcing a new, lesbian incarnation of the well-known character Batwoman, becoming the highest profile lesbian in the DC Universe. even while openly lesbian characters such as Gotham City police officer Renee Montoya already existed in DC Comics. The same year, the graphic memoir Fun Home: A Family Tragicomic by Alison Bechdel, was lauded by many media as among the best books of the year. Bechdel is the author of Dykes to Watch Out For, one of the best-known and longest-running LGBT comic strips.

In 2015, Moff Delian Mors became the first LGBT character in the Star Wars canon, (Note: There were same gender relationships in Star Wars: The Old Republic online roleplaying game after an outcry, introduced in 2015.) with her sexuality is not a major concern in the novel, suggesting that "homophobia isn't an issue in the Empire," and something the Imperial Army doesn't worry about, even as they fight rebels.

== Manga, anime, and animation ==
In Japanese manga and anime, lesbian content is called Girls Love (in Japan) or yuri. In the west, a distinction is occasionally made between yuri (more explicitly sex-based) and shōjo-ai (more romance-based), a term created in the west by analogy with shōnen-ai. Shōjo-ai is not used in that sense in Japan, where (as a manga term) it mainly denotes lolicon.

For years, there have been many LGBT couples in anime, with various characters who people feel validate their sexuality and gender, even if these characters are not canon. This is because LGBTQ anime is not new, although some reviewers say that there is a "wealth of LGBTQ+ focused series" within anime, especially those with earnest stories. Others noted the importance of having "yourself represented in one of the world's most popular entertainment."

There have been many prominent lesbian characters in Western animation and anime. The third season of Sailor Moon introduced Sailor Uranus and Sailor Neptune, a lesbian couple. However, the season was heavily censored when dubbed and shown on TV in North America. Many of the scenes which would suggest this particular relationship were cut away and the two characters were depicted as cousins (this led to further controversy as many fans noticed the editing). In many of the manga artist group Clamp's series such as Miyuki-chan in Wonderland or Cardcaptor Sakura, some characters are clearly lesbians. In Miyuki-chan in Wonderland, for example, Miyuki is constantly trying to escape the attention of scantily clad female admirers; while Tomoyo in CCS is famous for her ostensibly innocent but rather suspect obsession with playing "dress-up" with the lead character, Sakura. In a related series, Revolutionary Girl Utena, which aired in 1997, Juri Arisugawa, who is explicitly in love with her female classmate, Shiori, in both the TV series and movie, is described as "homosexual" by the creators of the series in the DVD booklet. In later years, Futaba Aasu in Puni Puni Poemy along with Fumi Manjōme and Akira Okudaira in Sweet Blue Flowers were openly lesbian characters. Apart from these characters, the main protagonists of Yurikuma Arashi (Note: Kureha Tsubaki, Sumika Izumino, Ginko Yurishiro, Lulu Yurigasaki, and Yurika Hakonaka) are presented as having various sexual encounters and romantic relationships.

There were numerous characters in Western animation. Patty Bouvier in The Simpsons, Korra in the series finale of The Legend of Korra where she held hands with Asami in a similar theme to Avatar: The Last Airbender's series finale with Aang and Katara. Pearl in Steven Universe, and Ruby and Sapphire in Steven Universe who have a romantic relationship with each other, and stay permanently fused to form Garnet. Amity Blight in the series The Owl House has been described as a lesbian, since she is in a relationship with her classmate, Luz Noceda.

In recent years, lesbian characters have gained relative prominence in various formats, especially since 2013 with the advent of streaming platforms like Netflix and Hulu. She-Ra and the Princesses of Power, which streamed on Netflix, featured various lesbian characters, such as, Netossa, Spinnerella, Adora, and Catra, the latter two around whom the story revolves.

== Video games ==
SaGa Frontier (a PlayStation title produced by Square) has a lesbian character named Asellus. Another character named Gina is a young girl who tailors Asellus' outfits, often discusses her deep attraction to Asellus and becomes her bride in one of the game's many endings. However, much related dialogue and some content has been edited out of the English-language version. The PlayStation title Fear Effect 2: Retro Helix (a prequel to Fear Effect) reveals that Hana Tsu Vachel, a main character in both games, had a sexual relationship with a female character named Rain Qin. Strawberry Panic! is a mild Japanese lesbian game for PlayStation 2 featuring romance amongst a group of female students living in a common all-girls' boarding house atop Astrea Hill. Tristia of the Deep-Blue Sea, Neosphere of the Deep-Blue Sky, Akai Ito and Ayakashi Ninden Kunoichiban, Fatal Frame II: Crimson Butterfly, Kashimashi: Girl Meets Girl are widely known in Japan. Chloe Price from the choice-based games Life Is Strange and its prequel Life Is Strange: Before the Storm, fell in love with both Rachel Amber and/or Max Caulfield, depending on the actions of the player. Gone Home is an interactive story game made by Fullbright that follows the story of a girl, Sam, who falls in love with her female best friend. In The Last of Us Part II, Ellie has a bisexual girlfriend. The party member Juhani in Star Wars: Knights of the Old Republic, a video game, is lesbian, though bugged coding on the initial release allowed her to be attracted to the player character regardless of gender. In subsequent patches, she reverts to same-sex preferences, with her and another female Jedi were also heavily implied to be lovers, making Juhani the first known gay character in the Star Wars universe.

== See also ==
- Media portrayals of bisexuality
- Media portrayal of asexuality
- Media portrayal of pansexuality
- Media portrayals of transgender people
- Media portrayal of LGBT people
- Lists of American television episodes with LGBT themes
- List of dramatic television series with LGBT characters
- List of LGBT characters in radio and podcasts
- List of television shows with LGBT characters
- LGBTQ themes in Western animation
- LGBTQ themes in anime and manga

== Bibliography ==
- Capsuto, Steven (2000). Alternate Channels: The Uncensored Story of Gay and Lesbian Images on Radio and Television. Ballantine Books. ISBN 978-0-345-41243-0.
- Tropiano, Stephen (2002). The Prime Time Closet: A History of Gays and Lesbians on TV. Hal Leonard Corporation. ISBN 978-1-55783-557-4.
