= Carlos García López =

Argentine rock guitarist

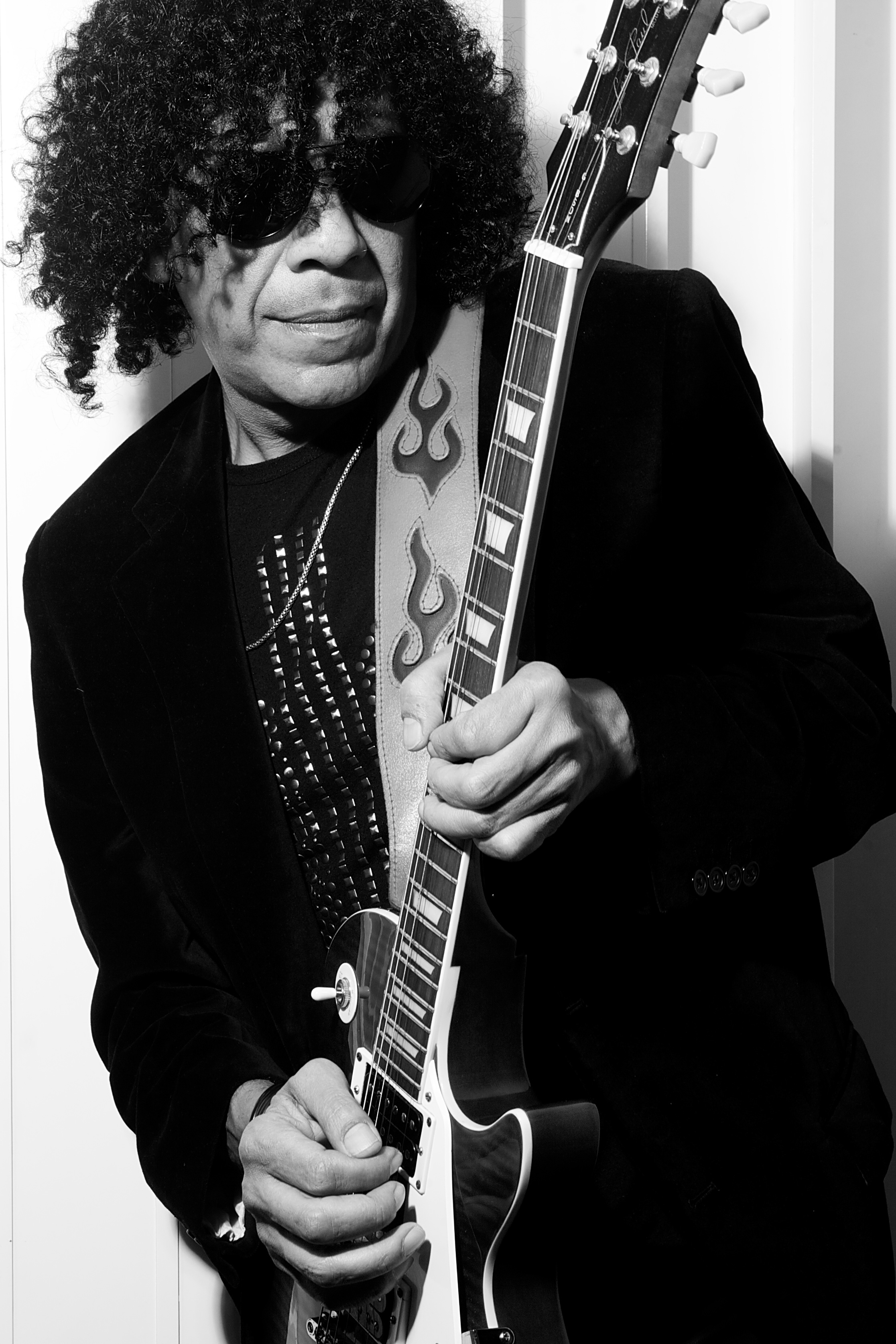
- García López in 2012
- Born: Carlos Alberto García López; 9 September 1958; Buenos Aires, Argentina
- Died: 27 September 2014 (aged 56); Tornquist, Argentina
- Other name: El Negro García López
- Occupations: Singer; songwriter; guitarist
- Years active: 1980–2014
- Musical career
- Genres: Argentine rock, rock and roll
- Instruments: Guitar; vocals
- Labels: P&P; Notorius; Sony Music

Carlos Alberto García López (9 September 1958 – 27 September 2014), better known as El Negro García López, was an Argentine guitarist and rock and roll musician, and one of the most influential instrumentalists of Argentine rock.

Alongside Patricia Sosa, he formed part of La Torre, one of the most popular rock bands in early 1980s Argentina. He would later form part of Charly García's ensemble, Los Enfermeros, before launching his own project, the García López Band, in 1992.

In 2012, García López was named the 12th most influential guitarist in Argentine rock by Rolling Stone magazine. He died in 2014 in a car accident on his way back to Buenos Aires from filming a music video.

== Early life ==
Carlos Alberto García López was born on 9 September 1958 in the Floresta neighborhood of Buenos Aires. He was born into an Afro-Argentine family with musical roots: his father, Manuel, played in a tropical music band under the name of "Paul Da Cruz", while his older brother Antonio played the bass and his younger sister Raquel danced and sang.

From an early age he was exposed to music of many different genres: jazz, salsa, tango, Argentine folk, and rock. When he was 15 years old he formed the band Cronos, which became relatively popular in the local scene and played as an opening act for Pappo's Blues in Uruguay.

== Musical career ==
In 1981, having met singer Patricia Sosa, García López joined her as part of La Torre, a hard rock act built upon the foundations of a previous band, Nomady Soul, which featured a different guitarist (Pilu Camacho). La Torre's self-titled debut album was released shortly after the end of the Falklands War, in 1982, to critical acclaim. The song Colapso nervioso was particularly well-received, and saw considerable airtime on local radio.

In 1984, he collaborated with Fito Páez for the release of his debut album, Del 63.

García López left La Torre in 1985, following the release of Sólo quiero rock & roll and a successful tour throughout Spain. He would then join Miguel Matos's band, ZAS, with whom he produced Solos en América (1986). The album reached regional success, and the band toured across Latin America throughout 1986.

Already an established guitarist by the end of the decade, García López joined forces with Charly García to record his fifth studio album, Cómo conseguir chicas (1989). Further collaborations with Charly include Filosofía barata y zapatos de goma (1990) and Say No More (1990). In 1998, he once again collaborated with Fito Páez in Enemigos íntimos (1998).

=== The García López Band ===
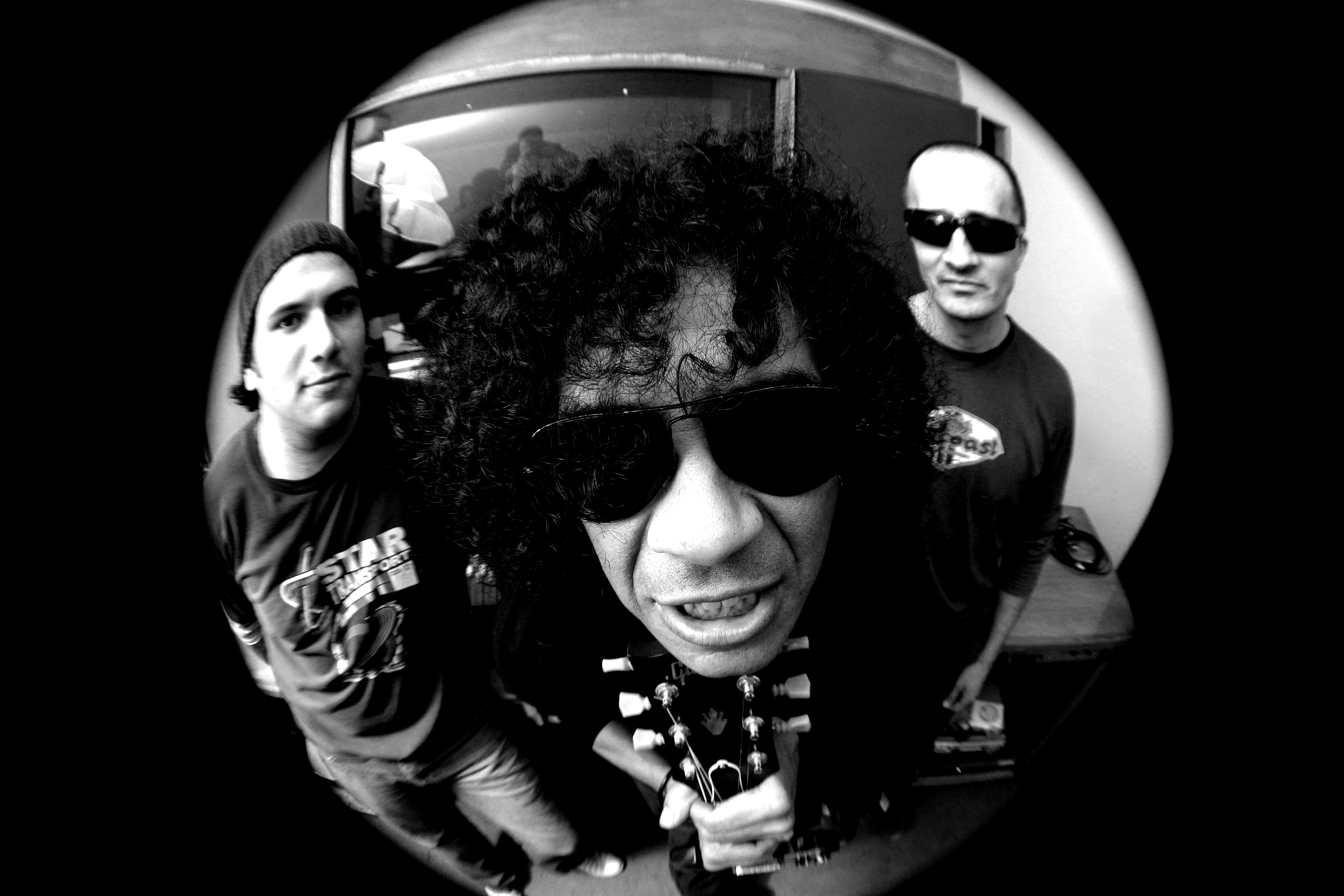
The García López Band in 2009.

The 1990s also saw the birth of his own ensemble, the García López Band, alongside former La Torre drummer Beto Topini and bassist Mariano Kon (who had former part of Moscú and TocToc alongside Charly García). The band saw moderate success and they toured extensively throughout Argentina, headlining the 1992 Festival Rock in La Falda. That same year, the García López Band released Da Cruz, their debut album produced at Estudios Panda and Estudios Del Cielito.

The first lineup of the García López Band eventually collapsed, and following a fallout with Charly García, García López moved to México City, where he "re-founded" his band with the Uruguayan "Pato" Dana in the bass and Freddy Valeriani in the piccolo bass. Later on, they would be joined by another Uruguayan, Roberto Rodino, in the drums.

In 2005, García López returned to Buenos Aires to record a new studio album at Panda. The resulting product, Números rojos (2006), saw a renewed partnership with Charly García, who played the keyboard and sang in the title track and Olvida Lo Pasado.

In 2010, he released Esta vez invita el Negro under Sony Music.

== Death ==
On 27 September 2014, García López died in a car crash on Ruta 76 while returning to Buenos Aires from Sierra de la Ventana, where he was recording a music video for Frenesí, alongside Almafuerte. He was 56 years old.

A number of musicians expressed their condolences following García López's death. On 1 October 2014, during the half-time of a football match between All Boys and Sarmiento de Junín at Estadio Islas Malvinas in Floresta, García López's friends and family were gifted with a special All Boys shirt made for him, who had been a lifelong fan and follower of the neighborhood club. The act was closed with the All Boys anthem, performed by García López himself.

== Discography ==
As a solo artist

- Da Cruz (1992)
- Números rojos (2006)
- Esta vez invita el Negro (2010)
- Frenesí (2013)
