= Sandra Mihanovich =

Argentine singer, musician, and composer

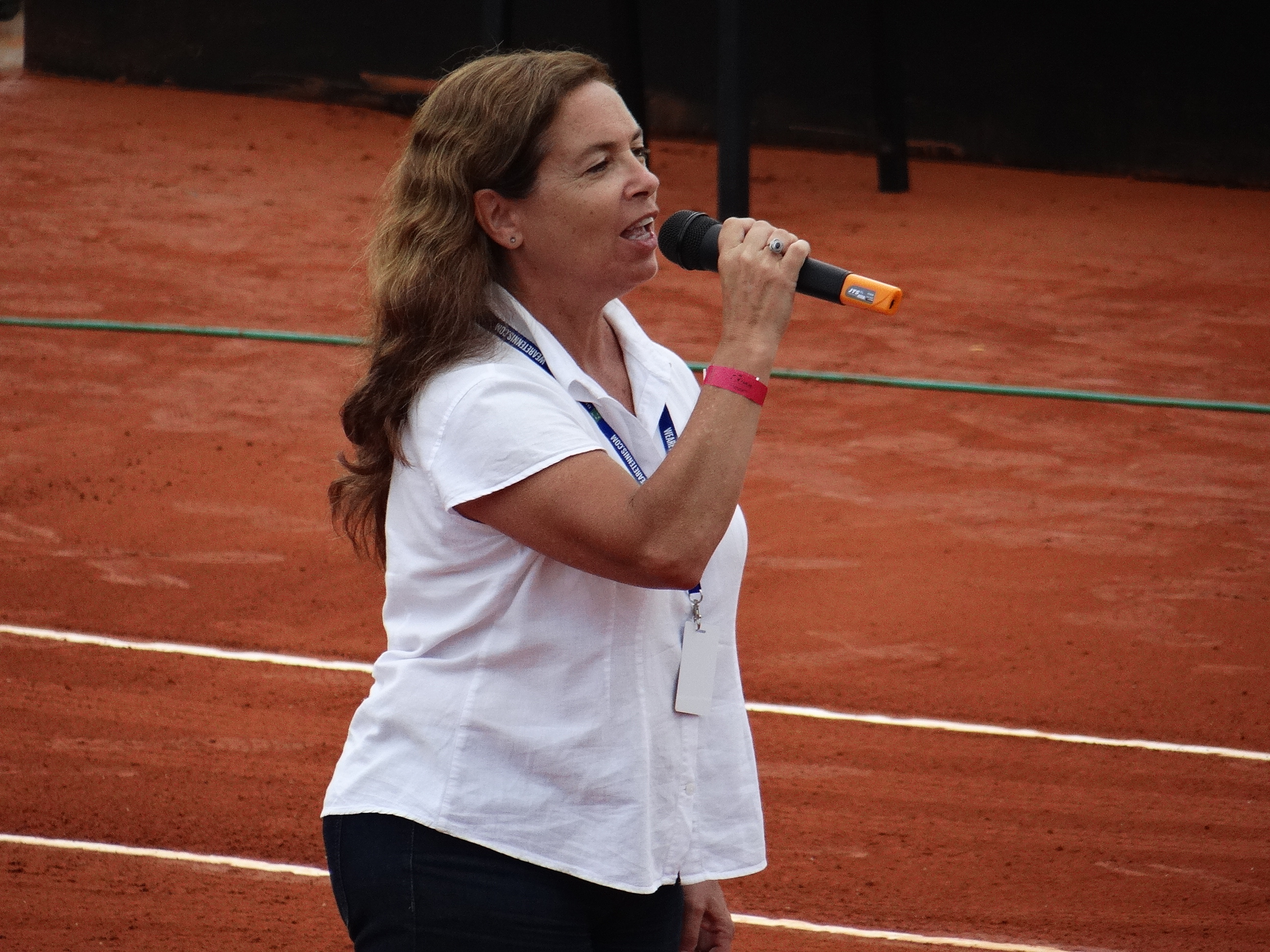
- Mihanovich in 2014
- Born: April 24, 1957 (age 69); Buenos Aires, Argentina
- Occupations: Singer-songwriter, actress
- Years active: 1977–present
- Spouse: María Paz Novaro

Sandra Mihanovich (born April 24, 1957) is an Argentine singer, musician, and composer of rock, blues, and tango rhythms.

== Biography ==
She was born in the Recoleta neighbourhood of Buenos Aires, Argentina, the daughter of Iván Mihanovich, a polo player of Croatian descent, and Mónica Cahen D'Anvers, a journalist and TV anchorperson. She inherited from her paternal grandfather her passion for jazz music. After completing high school (Northlands School, Olivos, Buenos Aires), she studied music at the Universidad Católica Argentina and, since March 1976, also theater at the Conservatorio de Arte Dramático. She is the niece of composer Sergio Mihanovich.

Her singing début was at "La Ciudad" pub on May 20, 1976. While working the pub circuit, she met fellow musician and composers Alejandro Lerner, Marilina Ross, Celeste Carballo, Horacio Fontova and Ruben Rada, whose songs she went on to include in her repertoire. She met her first producer, Ricardo Kleinman, after a show at the Universidad de Belgrano. In October 1982, she became the first female soloist holding a show at Obras, widely known as the Argentine "Rock Cathedral". This same year she released her song Puerto Pollensa which became a LBGT anthem in Argentina. She would later create more songs touching on LGBT themes, including with Celeste Carballo who she was in a romantic relationship with. In 1986 she won the "Antorcha de Plata" at the Viña del Mar Song Festival in Chile.

She took part in Santiago Moncada's theatrical play Brujas, alongside Moria Casán, Nora Cárpena, Graciela Dufau and María Leal.

The Legislative Chamber of Buenos Aires named her "Distinguished Personality of the Culture of the City" to honor her 30-year career. As an actress, she starred in the Vulnerables television series (1999), about a self-healing therapy group, and other movies and TV programs.

== Discography ==
- 1977: Pienso en vos ("Thinking of you")
- 1982: Puerto Pollensa ("Port Pollensa")
- 1983: Hagamos el amor (Let's Make Love)
- 1984: Soy lo que soy ("I Am What I Am")
- 1984: Sandra en Shams ("Sandra at Shams")
- 1985: Como la primera vez ("Like the First Time")
- 1986: Sandra en el paraíso ("Sandra in Paradise")
- 1988: Somos mucho más que dos ("We Are Much More Than Two"), with Celeste Carballo
- 1990: Mujer contra mujer ("Woman Against Woman"), with Celeste Carballo
- 1991: Si somos gente ("If We Are People")
- 1992: Todo brilla (Everything Shines)
- 1994: Cambio de planes ("Change of Plans")
- 1998: Manuelita, la tortuga de Pehuajó ("Manuelita, The Turtle from Pehuajó")
- 2000: Todo tiene un lugar ("Everything Has a Place")
- 2003: Sin tu amor ("Without Your Love")
- 2004: Inolvidables RCA: 20 Grandes Exitos (compilation)
- 2007: Creciendo ("Growing Up")
- 2009: Honrar la vida ("Honoring Life")
- 2012: Vuelvo a estar con vos ("Once Again With You")
- 2017: 40 años de música ("40 years of music")
- 2022: Bendiciones ("Blessings")
