= Patricia Sosa =

Argentine singer and actress

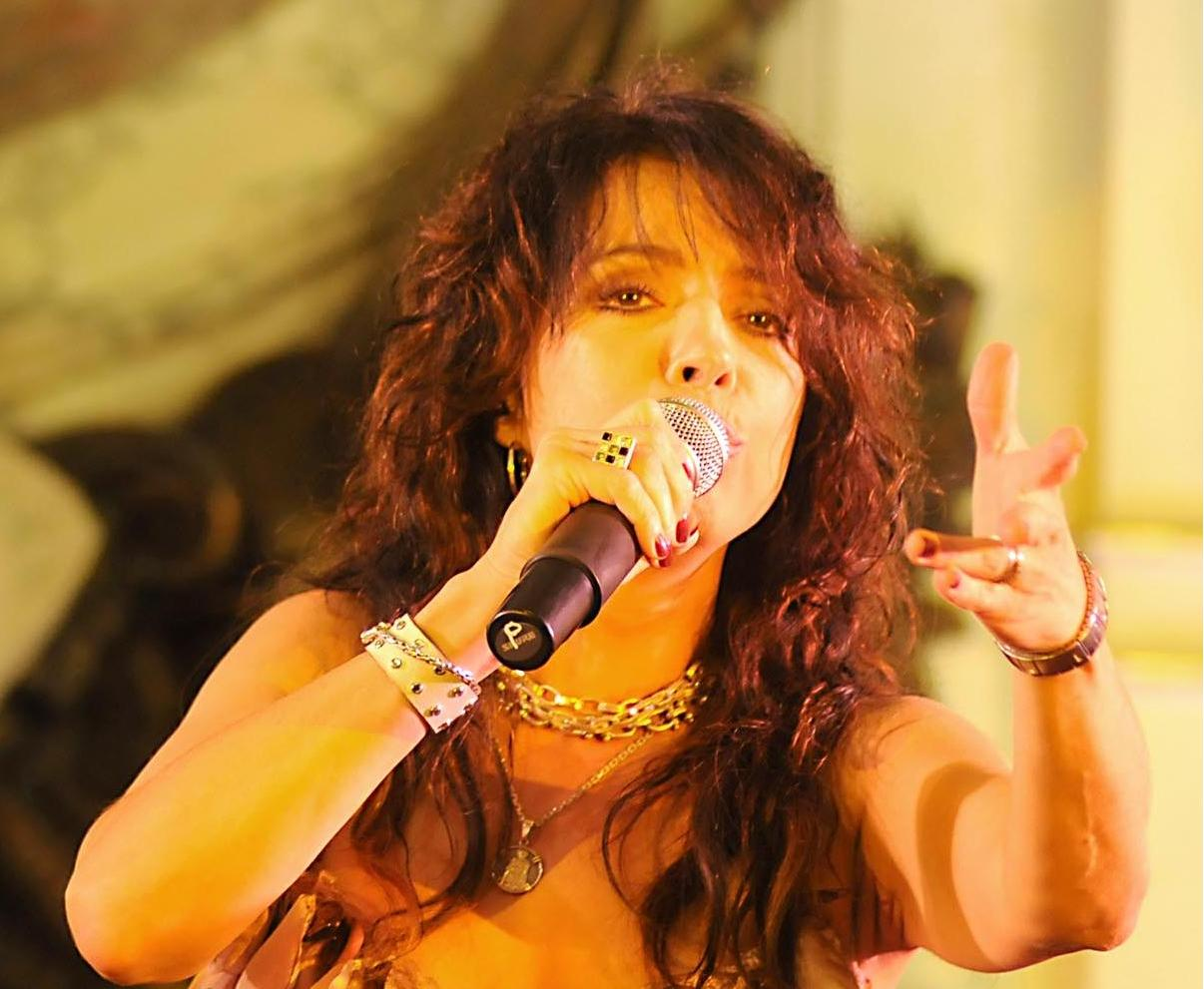
- Patricia Sosa singing at the Casa Rosada
- Born: 23 January 1956 (age 70); Buenos Aires, Argentina
- Occupations: Singer, actress
- Years active: 1975–present
- Spouse: Oscar Mediavilla
- Website: https://www.patriciasosa.com.ar/

Patricia Elena Sosa Gaitán (born January 23, 1956), known artistically as Patricia Sosa, is an Argentine rock and pop singer, songwriter, and actress.. She initially began her career in 1975 with the pop and soul band Nomady Soul, before achieving national recognition in the 1980s as the lead vocalist of the hard rock band La Torre. Sosa transitioned to a solo career in 1990, earning gold and platinum certifications and award nominations for albums such as Luz de mi vida. Alongside her music career, she has acted in Argentine television series including R.R.D.T. and Chiquititas, and also performed as a soloist for the Misa Criolla at St. Peter's Basilica in the presence of Pope Francis in 2014.

== Early life and band career ==
Patricia was born on 23 January 1956 in Barracas, Buenos Aires Province.She began her career in 1975 with the cover band Nomady Soul while studying architecture. While studying architecture, she began her musical career in 1975 by forming Nomady Soul, a pop and soul band that performed in English and Spanish. The group's members included Oscar Mediavilla (guitar), Pilu Camacho (guitar), Gustavo Giles (bass), Ricardo Giles (drums), and Luis Alberto Múscolo (keyboards). Although the band was subject to censorship under the 1976 Argentine civic-military dictatorship, they released four singles in 1978 through RCA Victor in 1978 before disbanding in 1980.

Following the disbandment of Nomady Soul, all its former members except Pilu formed La Torre. The band was formed in 1981, adding guitarist Carlos García López to the lineup. The band recorded their album in 1981 and finally released it in June 1982, under the same name as the band. Coincidentally, the release was at the same time when the Falklands War happened, that make a law to censor English-language music that gave a boost to national bands like them. Then, they did their first concert on 12 September 1982. They gained more popularity after performing at B.A. Rock. Following the performance, Pelo named the band the Breakthrough Group of '82.

== Solo career and actress role ==
Patricia Sosa left the band in 1990 to start a solo career. Her first CD was self-titled, and followed by a live EP. Her second CD, "Luz de mi vida", became gold 25 days after release, and platinum in three months. It received 5 nominations for the ACE awards. In 1994, she appeared as a guest artist on Plácido Domingo's Grammy-nominated album, De Mi Alma Latina.

In 1998, she starred in R.R.D.T. and starred in Chiquititas. In 1999, she published Código de barrio. On 12 December 2014, Patricia was a soloist with the La Nuova Musica in a performance of Ariel Ramírez's Misa Criolla in St. Peter's Basilica, Rome in the presence of Pope Francis and also the fiftieth anniversary of the work's composition and the performance was directed by Facundo Ramírez, son of the composer.

== Personal life ==
She is a vegetarian.
