= Damned Women =

Sculpture by Auguste Rodin

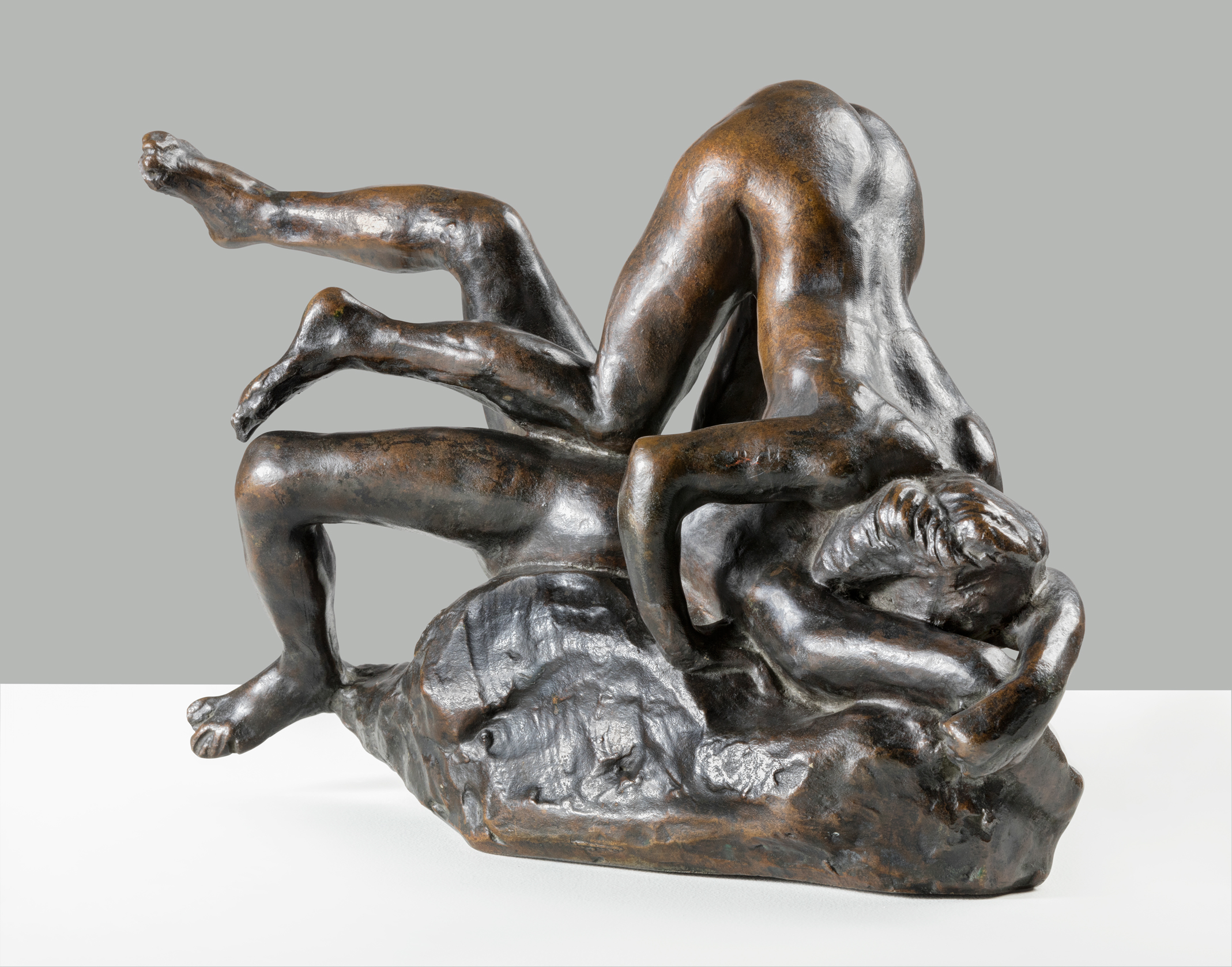
- A bronze cast in the Museo Soumaya, Mexico City
- Artist: Auguste Rodin
- Year: 1885–1890

Damned Women is a sculpture created by Auguste Rodin between 1885 and 1890 as part of his The Gates of Hell project—it appears on the upper right as the counterpart to The Fallen Caryatid.

== Description ==
It shows two embracing women, a theme also explored by the same artist in Youth Triumphant, Ovid's Metamorphoses and Illusions Received by the Earth.

According to Elsen:

Among the possible meanings Rodin added to the form of this work is the theme of lesbianism, which at times appears in his images of paired women: The Metamorphoses of Ovid, Damned Women (1885), and Illusions received by the Earth.

== Work ==
As in Metamorphoses, Rodin modelled the work on ballerinas from the Paris Opera, as recommended by Edgar Degas. The work also draws on Les Fleurs du mal by Charles Baudelaire, particularly Lesbos and two poems entitled Femmes damnées. According to Miranda:

Like the painters Courbet (1819–1877), Degas (1834–1917) and Toulouse-Lautrec (1864–1901) and the damned poets, Rodin was interested in lesbianism, for in the late 19th century lesbianism manifested as an exploration of the limits and excesses of sexuality

== See also ==
- List of sculptures by Auguste Rodin
