= Emilio Alfaro =

Argentine actor and director

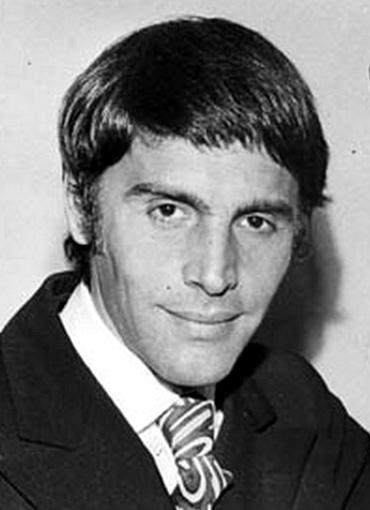
- Born: Emilio Vallarino Alfaro; January 20, 1933; Buenos Aires, Argentina
- Died: July 18, 1998 (aged 65); Buenos Aires, Argentina
- Spouse: Marilina Ross

Emilio Alfaro, born Emilio Vallarino Alfaro (January 20, 1933 in Buenos Aires – July 18, 1998), was an Argentine actor, and theatre and film director.

Alfaro played in the movies El jefe, La mesa del 10, La sentencia and El pibe cabeza. He also worked in the TV program Historias de jóvenes. He was married to the Argentine actress Marilina Ross for seven years. He died in 1998, at the age of 65.

== Selected filmography ==
- The Terrorist (1962)
