= La Capital (Mar del Plata) =

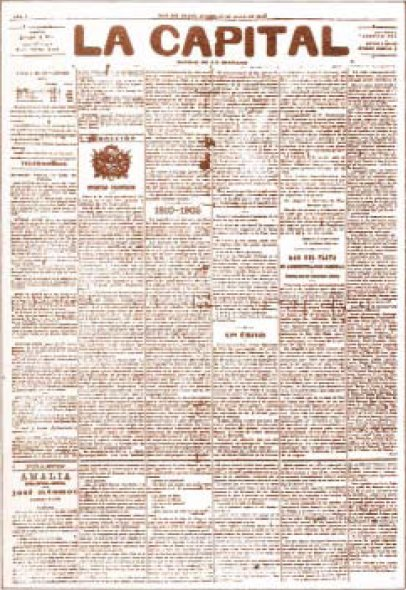
- First edition of La Capital, 25 May 1905
- Type: Daily newspaper
- Owner: Florencio Aldrey Iglesias
- Publisher: Multimedios La Capital
- Founded: 1905; 121 years ago
- Headquarters: Mar del Plata
- Circulation: 10,000
- Website: lacapitalmdp.com

La Capital is a local daily newspaper published in Mar del Plata, Argentina, established in 1905.

The newspaper was founded by Italian immigrant Victorio Tetamanti in 1905, its first edition being published on 25 May, on the 95th anniversary of the May Revolution. Tettamanti was a former steward at landowner Miguel Martinez de Hoz's ranch or estancia at Chapadmalal, then a rural area southwest of Mar del Plata. Tettamanti and Martinez de Hoz were both members of the Comite Mar del Plata ("Mar del Plata Committee"), with strong links to the local upper class, and shared the same conservative ideology. The paper was instrumental to the election as Mar del Plata's mayor of Jose Heguilor, another member of the committee, in 1906. The municipality faced a series of crisis from 1906 to 1911, a period characterized by the collapse of locally-elected governments and direct rule by commissioners appointed by the province of Buenos Aires senate. In this new context, La Capital eventually gave support to the Junta de Resistencia ("Board of Resistance"), a political space that pressed for the continuity of locally-chosen authorities. A democratic process followed, which ended up in 1920 with the election of socialist mayor Teodoro Bronzini. Socialism remained in power until yet another provincial intervention in 1929.

A museum and a library were inaugurated at the premises of the old newspaper's office to celebrate its centennial in 2005.

As of 2019, its average circulation was 10,000.
