= La Torre (band) =

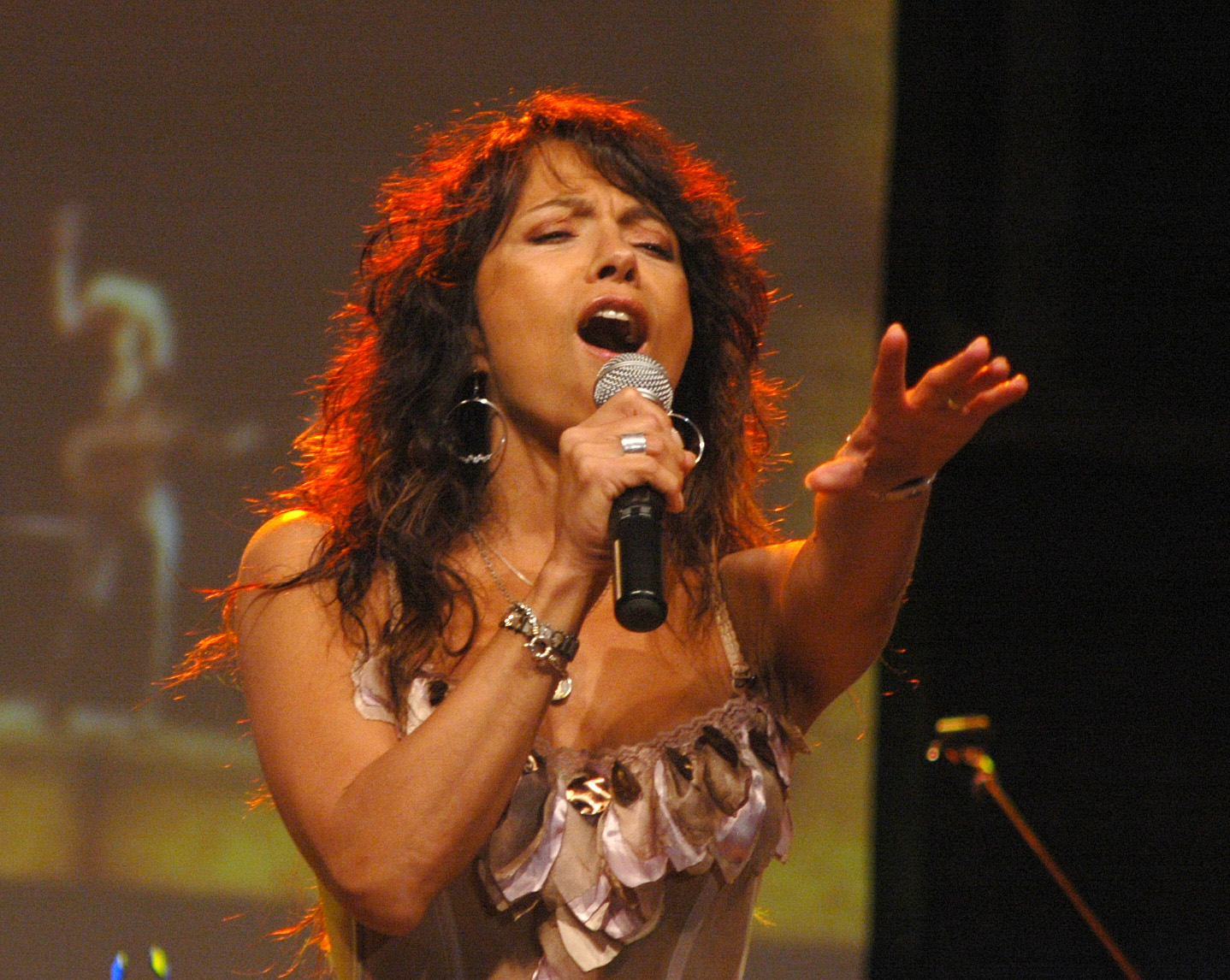

Background information
- Origin: Buenos Aires, Argentina
- Genres: Hard rock Blues rock Pop metal
- Years active: 1981-1989
- Labels: RCA Victor, DG Discos

La Torre was an Argentine rock band, led by vocalist Patricia Sosa, and founded in Buenos Aires in 1981. Active during the 1980s, the group transitioned from a hard rock style to a radio-friendly pop-metal sound, releasing five studio albums and a live record. Known as a prominent breakout act of the Argentine rock scene, they notably performed at major festivals like BA Rock and toured the U.S.S.R. before officially disbanding in 1989.

== Career ==
The first line-up included Gustavo Giles (bass), Ricardo Giles (drums), Carlos García López (guitar), Oscar Mediavilla (guitar), Luis Múscolo (keyboards), and Patricia Sosa (singer). They recorded a first, self-titled LP for RCA Victor in 1982.

They were also featured at the BA Rock festival in November 1982. Their single titled "Colapso nervio" was the song that secured them an invitation to the BARock in 1982. At that time, they were named the breakout act. Then they also starred in La Falda in 1983, and that same year they released their second album, Viaje a la libertad, which showed a rockier style, confirmed by the third LP, Sólo quiero rock & roll, from 1984. On this album, the lineup had already changed, with Fernando Lupano replacing Gustavo and Jota Morelli replacing Ricardo. In the same year, they were voted the best band of 1984, their song "Sólo quiero rock & roll" was voted the best song of the year, and they joined the Château Rock Festival in Córdoba in 1985. At the end of 1985, Garcia left the band to join Charly García, who Gady Pampillón replaced. A fourth album, Presas de caza, was released in 1986, featuring a radio-friendly pop-metal sound. The last effort, entitled Movimiento, was released by DG Discos in 1988, followed by a tour of the U.S.S.R., soon before the band's disbandment. The band finally broke up in 1989.

== Discography ==
- La Torre (1982)
- Viaje a la libertad (1983)
- Sólo quiero rock & roll (1984)
- Presas de caza (1986)
- En vivo (Live, 1987)
- Movimiento (1988)

== Members ==
- Patricia Sosa : Vocals (1981-1990)
- Oscar Mediavilla: Rhythm Guitar (1981-1990)
- Carlos García López (†): Lead Guitar (1981- 1985)
- Ricardo Giles: Drums (1981 - 1983)
- Gustavo Giles: Bass (1981- 1982)
- Jota Morelli: Drums (1983-1985)
- Fernando Lupano: Bass (1982- 1987)
- Luis Muscolo: Keyboards (1981- 1987)
- Beto Topini: Drums (1986-1990)
- Gady Pampillón: Lead Guitar (1986-1990)
- Ricky Matut: Bass (1987- 1990)
- Juan Forcada: Keyboards (1988-1990)
