= María Gabriela Epumer =

Argentine pop rock vocalist and guitarist (1963–2003)

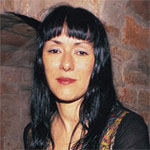

Background information
- Born: 1 August 1963; Villa Devoto, Buenos Aires, Argentina
- Died: 30 June 2003 (aged 39) French Hospital, Buenos Aires, Argentina
- Genres: Pop rock
- Occupations: singer and guitarist
- Instrument: guitar
- Years active: 1980–2003
- Formerly of: Rouge, Viuda e Hijas de Roque Enroll, the Montecarlo Jazz Ensemble, Las Chicas, Maleta de Loca

María Gabriela Epumer (1 August 1963 – 30 June 2003) was an Argentine pop rock vocalist and guitarist.

== Biography ==
Epumer was born on 1 August 1963 in Villa Devoto, Buenos Aires, Argentina, and was of Mapuche descent. Her great-grandfather, Epugner, was a lonko who was captured by General Eduardo Racedo during the Conquest of the Desert and held captive on Martín García Island, where he died four years later in 1884. Her parents were Juan Carlos Epumer and Dora Carballo and her grandfather Juan Epumer was the guitarist for Argentine singer Agustín Magaldi. Aged ten, she began studying guitar with Jorge Stirikas, professor at the Teatro Colón.

Epumer was a member of all-female band Viuda e Hijas de Roque Enroll, which was part of the renewal movement of Argentine rock. The band went multiplatinum and between 1983 and 1988 they released three albums. Epumer was also part of the Montecarlo Jazz Ensemble, Las Chicas, A1, and the duo Maleta de Loca. She later performed as a solo artist, with grunge and electronic influences.

In 1992, Epumer accompanied Luis Alberto Spinetta as the guitarist for Pelusón of Milk. In 1999, she featured in the film Nuclear Danger, directed by Milos Twilight.

Epumer performed at Buenos Aires Hot Festival in 2001 and at Viña del Mar Festival with Charly García in 2003.

She died of cardiorespiratory arrest on 30 June 2003 in Buenos Aires, aged 39.
