= Celeste Carballo =

Argentine singer-songwriter

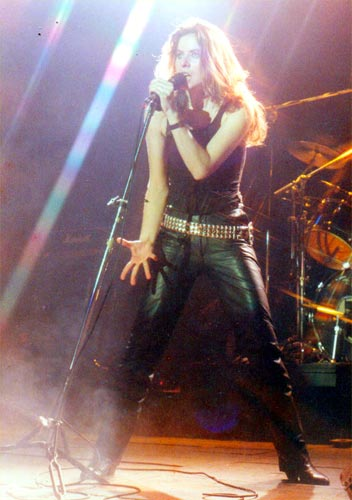
- Celeste Carballo in 1986

Background information
- Born: Celeste Primavera Carballo; September 21, 1956 (age 69); Buenos Aires, Argentina
- Genres: Rock; Blues; Hard rock Punk; Tango
- Occupations: Singer, songwriter, guitarist
- Instruments: Vocals, guitar, drums, piano
- Years active: 1982–present
- Label: EMI

Celeste Primavera Carballo (born September 21, 1956) is an Argentine singer-songwriter in rock, blues, hard rock, punk and tango.

== Life ==
Celeste Carballo was born and raised in Buenos Aires, Argentina. She became known in the early 1980s for her distinctive voice range from B2 to F#6 in head voice. Her highest note in chest voice is B5. This way, her voice covers 3.7 octaves.

In the late 1980s, she made public her homosexuality and publicly confessed her romance with fellow singer Sandra Mihanovich. Although her confession was unprecedented in the memory of a still fairly inexperienced in basic issues country, this did not affect her career.

In 2010, she begins the elaboration of what will become in autumn 2011 her next studio album. "Mujer de piedra", a rock and blues album with ten new songs that the composer has been writing throughout these years of silence since her last album of unpublished songs (Tercer infinito, 1998). The album will be presented at the ND Ateneo theater on May 14, whose first promotional single is "Cruz del sur" chosen by Mega 98.3 in support of Mujer de piedra; while the singer has chosen the reggae "Quema tóxica" to film the video clip to add meaning to the cause and raise awareness of the fumes generated by burning garbage.

Among her best known songs are "¿Seré judía?", "Me vuelvo cada día más loca", "Es la vida que me alcanza", "Mi último blues", "Mujer contra mujer" and "Una canción diferente". In 2015, she received her fourth Konex Award in her career, defining herself, according to the Konex Foundation, for 4 decades in a row as one of the best female rock soloists in Argentina.

== Discography ==
Year	Album	Label
1982	Me vuelvo cada día más loca	Interdisc
1983	Mi voz renacerá	Interdisc
1984	Porqué cantamos (with Juan Carlos Baglietto, Celeste Carballo, Nito Mestre and Oveja Negra)	EMI
1985	Celeste y La Generación	Interdisc
1988	Somos mucho más que dos (with Sandra Mihanovich)	BMG
1990	Mujer contra Mujer (with Sandra Mihanovich)	BMG
1991	Celeste en Buenos Aires	BMG
1993	Chocolate inglés	BMG
1995	Live at The Roxy	Roxy/Musimundo
1998	Tercer infinito	DBN
2001	Celesteacústica	Tocka Discos
2004	Celesteacusticados!	Pelo
2008	Celos	BMV
2011	Mujer de piedra	EMI

== See also ==
- LGBT rights in Argentina
- Argentine rock
- Argentine punk
