= Marilina Ross =

Argentine singer and actress

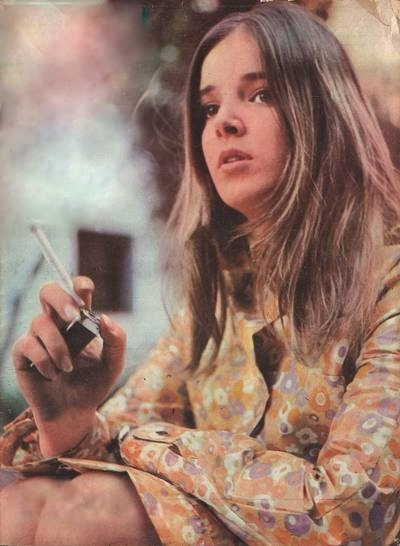
- Born: María Celina Parrondo; February 16, 1943 (age 83); Liniers, Buenos Aires, Argentina
- Occupations: Actress, singer
- Notable work: "Puerto Pollensa"
- Website: Marilina Ross

Marilina Ross (born María Celina Parrondo; February 16, 1943, in Liniers, Buenos Aires) is an Argentine singer and actress. She went into exile in Spain during the years of the military dictatorship (1976–1983), because this would not allow her to develop her artistic activities in Argentina.

Ex-spouse of actor Emilio Alfaro, she is a friend of the actresses Norma Aleandro, Cristina Banegas, Selva Alemán, singer Piero and writer Alberto Migré. Also, she was a friend of actress Bárbara Mujica, with whom she shared several works.

== Discography ==
- 1968: Carta a papá/Vivir aquí
- 1974: Estados de ánimo
- 1975: Queréme... tengo frío
- 1982: Soles
- 1983: A mis queridos seres; (reissue Estados de ánimo with Queréme... tengo frío)
- 1985: Grandes éxitos en vivo
- 1986: Cruzando las grandes aguas
- 1987: Mis hijos naturales
- 1987: Serie de oro - Marilina for Marilina
- 1989: Conectándome
- 1990: Latiendo
- 1991: Contra viento y marea
- 1991: Cachuso Rantifuso
- 1993: De amor y locuras
- 2000: Más que un sueño
- 2003: Serie de oro - Greatest Hits (Compilation)
- 2004: De colección (Compilation)
- 2005: Lo mejor de los mejores (Compilation)
- 2010: Por arte de magia (CD - DVD)
