= Alejandro Lerner =

Argentine musician and singer-songwriter (born 1957)

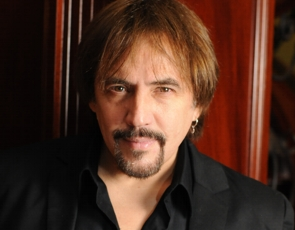

Background information
- Born: Buenos Aires, Argentina
- Genres: Argentine rock Latin Pop
- Occupation: Musician
- Instruments: Piano; Keyboards vocals
- Years active: 1973 –present

Alejandro Federico Lerner (born June 8, 1957) is an Argentine musician and singer-songwriter. He has written and sung countless songs including several hits, and his fame and recognition spread all over South America.

Through his career, Lerner played in different bands, formed his own group, and worked with international artists such as Luis Miguel, Paul Anka, and Celine Dion.

Lerner was born in Buenos Aires to a family of Ashkenazi Jewish origin. In 1974, he was discovered by Raúl Porchetto, who invited him to join a short-term project called Reino de Munt. In 1977, Lerner participated in Gustavo Santaolalla's band Soluna. In addition, Alejandro Lerner was consolidating his skills as a performer while working with well-known Argentine singers Leon Gieco and Sandra Mihanovich.

In 1981, Lerner formed a band called la Magia, playing along with bass player Hernán Magiano, guitarist Damián Figueroa, saxophonist Oscar Kreimer, and drummer Luis Querón, releasing Alejandro Lerner y La Magia in 1982. A year later, the band broke up and he decided to start his solo career, releasing Todo a Pulmón that same year and Lerner Tres in 1984. In 1998, Alejandor Lerner recorded the theme "Paths of the Soul" next to Kennedy Choir[2] and with more than 120 Argentine artists under the direction of Instrumental pianist and conductor Nazareno Andorno. In 1999, a compilation of his greatest hits, called 20 Años (20 Years), was released.

In 2002, Lerner gained exposure in the US when he collaborated with Carlos Santana on the song "Hoy Es Adiós" which was released on Santana's album Shaman. In 2021 both artists collaborated again on the single "Puro Sentimiento", which was remixed in 2022 with Sofía Reyes and L-Gante.

== Discography ==
=== 1970s ===
- 1979 Sus primeras canciones

=== 1980s ===
- 1982 Alejandro Lerner y la Magia
- 1983 Todo a pulmón
- 1984 Lernertres
- 1985 Conciertos
- 1987 Algo que decir
- 1988 Canciones

=== 1990s ===
- 1990 Entrelíneas
- 1992 Amor infinito
- 1994 Permiso de volar
- 1995 La magia continúa
- 1997 Magic hotel
- 1997 Volver a empezar
- 1999 20 años

=== 2000s ===
- 2000 Si quieres saber quién soy
- 2002 Lerner vivo
- 2003 Buen viaje
- 2006 Canciones para gente niña
- 2007 Enojado
- 2008 "EN VIVO EN EL GRAN REX CD Y DVD"
- 2016 "Autentico"
