= Argentinísima II =

- Directed by: Fernando Ayala; Héctor Olivera
- Written by: Fernando Ayala; Héctor Olivera
- Starring: Santiago Ayala; Domingo Cura
- Release date: 1973
- Country: Argentina
- Language: Spanish

Argentinísima II (English: Most Argentine II) is a 1973 Argentine musical documentary film directed and written by Fernando Ayala and Héctor Olivera. It is the sequel to the 1972 Argentinísima. The film premiered on 21 June 1973 in Buenos Aires.

== Cast ==
- Santiago Ayala
- Domingo Cura
- Eduardo Falú
- Hernán Figueroa Reyes
- Los Fronterizos
- Ramona Galarza
- Gina Maria Hidalgo
- Luis Landriscina
- Julio Marbíz
- Ariel Ramírez
- Edmundo Rivero
- Carlos Torres Vila
- Norma Viola
- Atahualpa Yupanqui
