= Argentinísima =

- Promotional Poster
- Directed by: Fernando Ayala; Héctor Olivera
- Written by: Félix Luna; Marcelo Simón
- Starring: Santiago Ayal; Domingo Cura
- Edited by: Oscar Montauti
- Release date: June 8, 1972
- Running time: 114 minutes
- Country: Argentina
- Language: Spanish

Argentinísima (English: Most Argentine) is a 1972 Argentine musical documentary film directed by Fernando Ayala and Héctor Olivera written by Félix Luna. The film premiered on 8 July 1972 in Buenos Aires.

The film consists of musical performances, mostly Argentine folklore, many of which are accompanied by dancing. Several sequences were filmed in scenic locations throughout the country.

Argentinísima II was released the following year in 1973.

== Cast ==
- Santiago Ayala
- Jorge Cafrune
- Los Chalchaleros
- Tránsito Cocomarola
- Jovita Díaz
- Eduardo Falú
- Ramona Galarza
- Horacio Guarany
- Nélida Lobato
- Julio Marbíz
- Ástor Piazzolla
- Los Quilla-Huasi
- Ariel Ramírez
- Mercedes Sosa
- Norma Viola
- Atahualpa Yupanqui
