= Cafrune =

Cafrune may refer to:

- Jorge Cafrune, Argentine singer
  - Cafrune (album), a 1962 album by Jorge Cafrune
- Yamila Cafrune, Argentine folk music singer, daughter of Jorge Cafrune
