= Cocaine Wars =

1985 film directed by Héctor Olivera

- Theatrical release poster
- Directed by: Héctor Olivera
- Screenplay by: Steven M. Krauzer
- Story by: Héctor Olivera; David Viñas
- Produced by: Roger Corman; Alejandro Sessa; Fernando Ayala (associate producer); Luis Osvaldo Repetto (associate producer – uncredited)
- Starring: John Schneider; Royal Dano; Federico Luppi; Rodolfo Ranni; Patti Davis
- Cinematography: Victor Hugo Caula; Victor Kaulen
- Edited by: Eduardo López; Edward Lowe
- Music by: George Brock; Jorge López Ruiz
- Production companies: Aries Cinematográfica Argentina; New Horizons
- Distributed by: Concorde Cinema Group; Aries Cinematográfica Argentina
- Release date: June 25, 1985
- Running time: 82 minutes
- Countries: Argentina; United States
- Languages: English; Spanish

Cocaine Wars is a 1985 Argentine and American action film directed by Héctor Olivera and starring John Schneider, Federico Luppi, Rodolfo Ranni and Royal Dano. It was written by Olivera, Steven M. Krauzer and David Viñas. The associate producer of the film was Fernando Ayala. It premiered in Argentina on June 25, 1985.

Cocaine Wars is one of the ten films that Roger Corman produced in Argentina during the 1980s.

== Synopsis ==
Miami-based DEA agent Cliff Adams is in a South American nation (purportedly, Bolivia), working undercover within the organization of Gonzalo Reyes, the biggest cocaine exporter in South America. Cliff's significant other, Janet Meade, is a reporter trying to gather evidence on Reyes. Reyes orders Cliff to kill Marcelo Villalba, a journalist who is running for his nation's position as president so he can bring Reyes down, but Cliff can't bring himself to kill Marcelo. Reyes is afraid Marcelo will put him out of business and is afraid that Janet's story will do the same thing, so Reyes sends someone else after Marcelo, and then Reyes has Janet kidnapped. Cliff is the only one who can rescue Janet and stop Reyes.

== Cast ==
- John Schneider as DEA Agent Cliff Adams/Cliff Vickry
- Federico Luppi as Gonzalo Reyes
- Royal Dano as Bailey
- Rodolfo Ranni as General Luján
- Kathryn Witt as Janet Meade
- Ivan Grey as Klausmann
- Richard Hamlin as Wilhelm
- Edgar Moore as Rikki
- Armando Capó as Oswaldo (as Armand Capo)
- Martin Korey as Gomez
- Tom Cundom as Bailey's driver
- Ken Edgar as Kenny
- Joe Capanga as Miguel
- Marcos Woinsky as Pugg
- Jacques Arndt as Franco
- Willy Marcos as Hernandos
- John Vitali as Marcelo Villalba
- Patti Davis as Rosita (as Patricia Davis)
- Haydée Padilla as Lola (as Heidi Paddle)
- Helen Grant as Pia
- Theodore McNabney as TV reporter #1 (as Ted McNabney)
- Patricia Scheuer as TV reporter #2
- Martin Coria as Gómez
- Edgardo Moreira as Ricky
- Arturo Noal as Julio
- Miguel Ángel Solá
- José Pablo Feinmann
- Juan Vitali

== Production ==
Hector Olivera had previously directed Wizards of the Lost Kingdom and Barbarian Queen; both coproduced by Olivera and Corman.

Although the film was set in an imaginary Latin American country it was shot in the Salta and Jujuy provinces in Northern Argentina. The original screenplay was written by renowned novelist David Viñas after he made a thorough research into the international drugs market and trafficking. However, the script was entirely rewritten by U.S. screenwriter Steven M. Krauer before shooting.

== Release ==
In July 1985 it was announced Roger Corman's newly formed distribution company Concorde Pictures would team with Cinema Group to distribute films. Their first releases would include Club Sandwich (which became Last Resort), Cocaine Wars from Concorde, and Born American and Hollywood Vice Squad from Cinema Group.

== Reception ==
A review in Miami News called the film "a mind-boggling atrocity".

The Los Angeles Times called it "a standard low budget action film but there are a few encouraging things in it... a step up from the pits perhaps but up nonetheless."

The San Francisco Examiner said it was "like bad Mexican television".

Speaking in an interview director David Gordon Green said that if he ever made a sequel to The Pineapple Express he would like to make it like Cocaine Wars which he called: "really good. I’d like to do that. Something in South America or something hard-core."
