= Carlos Torres Vila =

Carlos Torres Vila may refer to:

- Carlos Torres Vila (musician) (1946–2010), Argentinian folk singer
- Carlos Torres Vila (banker) (born 1966), Spanish banker
