= Ramona Galarza =

Argentine singer (1940–2020)

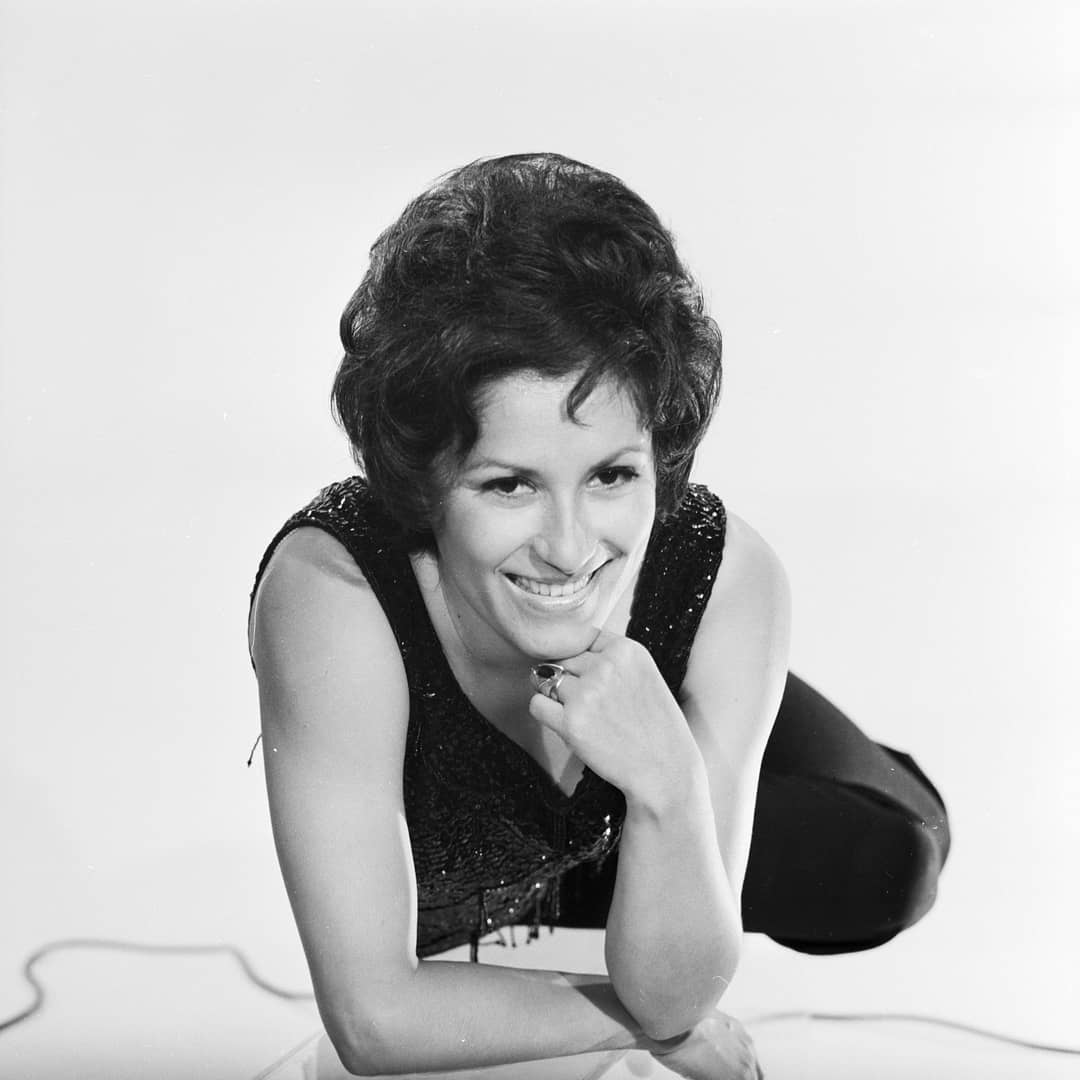

Background information
- Born: 15 June 1940; Corrientes, Argentina
- Died: 22 September 2020 (aged 80); Buenos Aires, Argentina
- Genres: Chamamé, música litoraleña
- Occupation(s): Singer, actress
- Instrument: Voice

Ramona Modesta Onetto Galarza (15 June 1940 – 22 September 2020), most often known as Ramona Galarza, was an Argentine folk singer. She was a popular singer of chamamé and recorded over 30 albums during her career. Born in Corrientes, she later moved to Buenos Aires and became known as La Novia del Paraná. She also appeared in a number of films and was honored by the Argentine Senate.

== Early life ==
Ramona Modesta Onetto Galarza was born on 15 June 1940 in Corrientes to Carlos Eleuterio Onetto and Mauricia Galarza. She was a soloist in the Folkloric Orchestra of Corrientes Province.

== Career ==
Galarza was promoted by Herminio Giménez and had a small part in the 1958 film Alto Paraná by Catrano Catrani. After achieving popularity in Corrientes, Galarza moved to Buenos Aires and became known as La Novia del Paraná. At a test for a record label, she met the producer Fernando López, who she later married. She recorded her first album, Litoraleña, in 1959. It included the songs "Kilómetro 11" and "Virgencita del Río" from the film Alto Paraná, which later became staples in her repertoire. In Buenos Aires, Galarza was a renowned singer of chamamé, singing in festivals, clubs and theaters. She was considered an ambassador of música litoraleña, and appeared on radio and television programs.

"I arrived at a time when folklore was booming and they accepted me. Everything was folklore and I just arrived with the chamamé and it went very well, thank God... I'm just a grain of sand that arrived at the right time, but before me there were those who I already named... Montiel, Sosa Cordero, Tarragó Ros, Cocomarola, Vera Lucero ... all those people are the ones who did everything. I was lucky to arrive just at that moment."

During her career, Galarza recorded over 30 albums, mostly for the Odeón record label. In 1978 she released the album Los grandes del litoral with fellow Argentine singer Antonio Tarragó Ros. She also toured around the world and gave performances at many venues, including Carnegie Hall.

== Later life and death ==
Galarza was honored by the Argentine Senate in 2008 for her cultural contributions. Her final public performance was at the 2020 Chamamé National Festival where she joined Teresa Parodi and María Ofelia on stage. She was honored with the General Jose de San Martin award.

Galarza suffered a heart attack at her home in Buenos Aires and died on 22 September 2020 at Hospital Pirovano.

== Albums ==
=== Solo albums ===
- Litoraleña (1960), Odeón LDI-402
- Misionerita (1961), Odeón LDI-449
- La novia del Paraná (1961), Odeón LDI-460
- Brisa suave (1962), Odeón LDI-493
- Alma guaraní (1962), Odeón LDI-521
- Ramona Galarza (1963), Odeón DMO-55470
- Río manso (1963), Odeón LDI-550
- La voz del litoral (1964), Odeón LDI-228
- Los grandes sucesos de Ramona Galarza y su conjunto (1966), Odeón CM 4002
- Cancionero guarani (1966), Odeón LDB-75
- La voz inimitable (1966), Odeón LDB-109
- Noches correntinas (1967), Odeón LDB-123
- Correntina (1968), Odeón LDB-156
- Lunita de Taragüí (1968), Odeón CM 4064
- La vestido celeste (1968), Odeón DMO-55520
- Canción del adiós (1969), Odeón LDB-189
- Kilómetro 11 (1969), Odeón CM 4085
- Memorias De Una Vieja Canción (1970), Odeón LDB-1022
- Le canta al Paraguay (1970), Odeón CM 4105
- Para que no me olvides (1971), Odeón SLDB-1054
- Mi provincia guarani, EMI 4342
- Al Paraguay con amor, EMI 6373
- Los mayores éxitos de Ramona Galarza, EMI 6635
- Homenaje a Agustín Lara (1971), EMI 6829
- Mi tierra litoral (1972), EMI- Odeón S911
- Al amor de mi vida (1972), EMI- Odeón 51021
- Retrato (1972), EMI- Odeón 53017
- Pescador y guitarrero (1974), EMI 6567
- Autentica (1974), EMI 6632
- Ah, mi Corrientes porá (1974), EMI 6952
- Grandes del Litoral, together with Tarrago Ros (1976), EMI 6274
- Te damos gracias señor (1976), EMI 6316
- La máxima del litoral (1980), EMI 6136
- Chamamé (1986), CBS 80530
- Grandes Éxitos, EMI 6494
- Ramona Galarza canta a: Alberico Mansilla (compilation of her first recordings publishing in 1986), EMI 6758

=== Albums with other artists ===
- Carnaval correntino, with Coco Díaz, 1968
- Los Grandes del litoral Vol 1, with Tarrago Ros, 1976
- Los grandes del Litoral Vol. 2, with Los Reyes del Chamamé
- Correntinas, with Teresa Parodi, 1993
- Correntinas II, with Teresa Parodi, 1995

== Films ==
- Alto Paraná (1958)
- Buenas noches, Buenos Aires (1964)
- Viaje de una noche de verano (1965)
- Cosquín, amor y folklore (1965)
- Ya tiene comisario el pueblo (1967)
- Argentinísima (1972)
- Argentinísima II (1973)
- El canto cuenta su historia (1976)
- Mire que es lindo mi país (1981)
