= Me First =

Me First may refer to:

- Me First (album), a 2004 album released by indie band The Elected
- Me First and the Gimme Gimmes, a punk rock supergroup that records covers of older pop songs
- Me First (film), a 1964 Argentine drama film
