= Yamila Cafrune =

Argentine folk music singer

Yamila Cafrune (born in Buenos Aires, November 16, 1965) is an Argentine folk music singer. She is the daughter of Jorge Cafrune, who was also a folklore singer. She currently lives in Cañuelas, a small town in Buenos Aires Province.

== Biography ==
Born November 16, 1965, she has 2 sisters. Her parents named her Yamila in honour of Djamila Boupacha. One of her sisters – Eva Encarnación Cafrune is named after Eva Perón and Encarnación – the wife of 19th century Buenos Aires province caudillo Juan Manuel de Rosas. The other is called Victoria, after Doña Victoria – the wife of "Chacho" Peñaloza. Her brother Juan Facundo Cafrune is named after the caudillo Rioja Facundo Quiroga.

Yamila released her album En Vivo ("Live") in 2006. The CD has twelve songs, recorded in December 2005 in the Gregorio de Laferrère theatre in Morón. The song list is varied, with tracks that include "Your mark on me", Diego Gallo, "The finadita" of the brothers Diaz, "Road to the rodeo" by Roberto Ternan, "Juana Azurduy" Ramirez and Luna, "Father" "Heritage" and "Zamba de mi esperanza".

== See also ==
- Music of Argentina
- Folk Music

== Sources ==
- Micheletto, Karina (March 8, 2001). "The story of the end of Jorge Cafrune. A questionable death". Página/12 (in Spanish).
