= Norma Viola =

Argentine dancer

- Born: December 18, 1929; Córdoba, Argentina
- Died: December 12, 2004 (aged 74)
- Occupation(s): Dancer and actress

Norma Viola (1934–2004) was an Argentine dancer.

== Selected filmography ==
- Cosquín, Love and Folklore (1965)
- Story of a Poor Young Man (1968)
- Argentinísima (1972)
- Argentinísima II (1973)
- Tango Bar (1987)
