= Story of a Poor Young Man (1968 film) =

- Directed by: Enrique Cahen Salaberry
- Written by: Octave Feuillet (novel); Virgilio Muguerza
- Produced by: Carlos García Nacson
- Starring: Leo Dan; Niní Marshall; Rafael Carret; Guillermo Battaglia
- Cinematography: Mario Pagés
- Edited by: Jacinto Cascales
- Music by: José Carli; Lucio Milena
- Production company: Producciones García Nacson
- Distributed by: Artistas Argentinos Asociados
- Release date: April 11, 1968
- Running time: 90 minutes
- Country: Argentina
- Language: Spanish

Story of a Poor Young Man (Spanish: La novela de un joven pobre) is a 1968 Argentine musical drama film directed by Enrique Cahen Salaberry and starring Leo Dan, Niní Marshall and Rafael Carret. It is a remake of the 1942 film of the same name, which was based on a novel by Octave Feuillet.

== Cast ==
- Leo Dan as Leonardo Martinéz Dan
- Niní Marshall as Carolina
- Rafael Carret as Mariano
- Erika Wallner as Margarita Quijano
- Guillermo Battaglia as Santiago Quijano
- Roberto Airaldi as Don Lorenzo
- Silvina Rada as Luisita
- Los Títeres de Horacio
- Santiago Ayala
- Norma Viola
- Susana Giménez
- Abel Sáenz Buhr

== Bibliography ==
- Goble, Alan. The Complete Index to Literary Sources in Film. Walter de Gruyter, 1999.
