= Music of Argentina =

The music of Argentina includes a variety of traditional, classical, and popular genres. According to the Harvard Dictionary of Music, Argentina also has "one of the richest art music traditions and perhaps the most active contemporary musical life."

One of the country's most significant cultural contributions is the tango, which originated in Buenos Aires and its surrounding areas during the end of the 19th century. Folk music was popular during the mid-20th century, experiencing a revival in popularity during the 1950s and 1960s with the rise of the Nuevo cancionero movement. The mid-to-late 1960s also saw the rise of Argentine rock (known locally as rock nacional), which is considered one of the earliest incarnations of Spanish-language rock to have an autochthonous identity that prioritized original compositions in Spanish. Rock nacional was widely embraced by the youth and has become an important part of the country's musical identity.

== Folk music ==
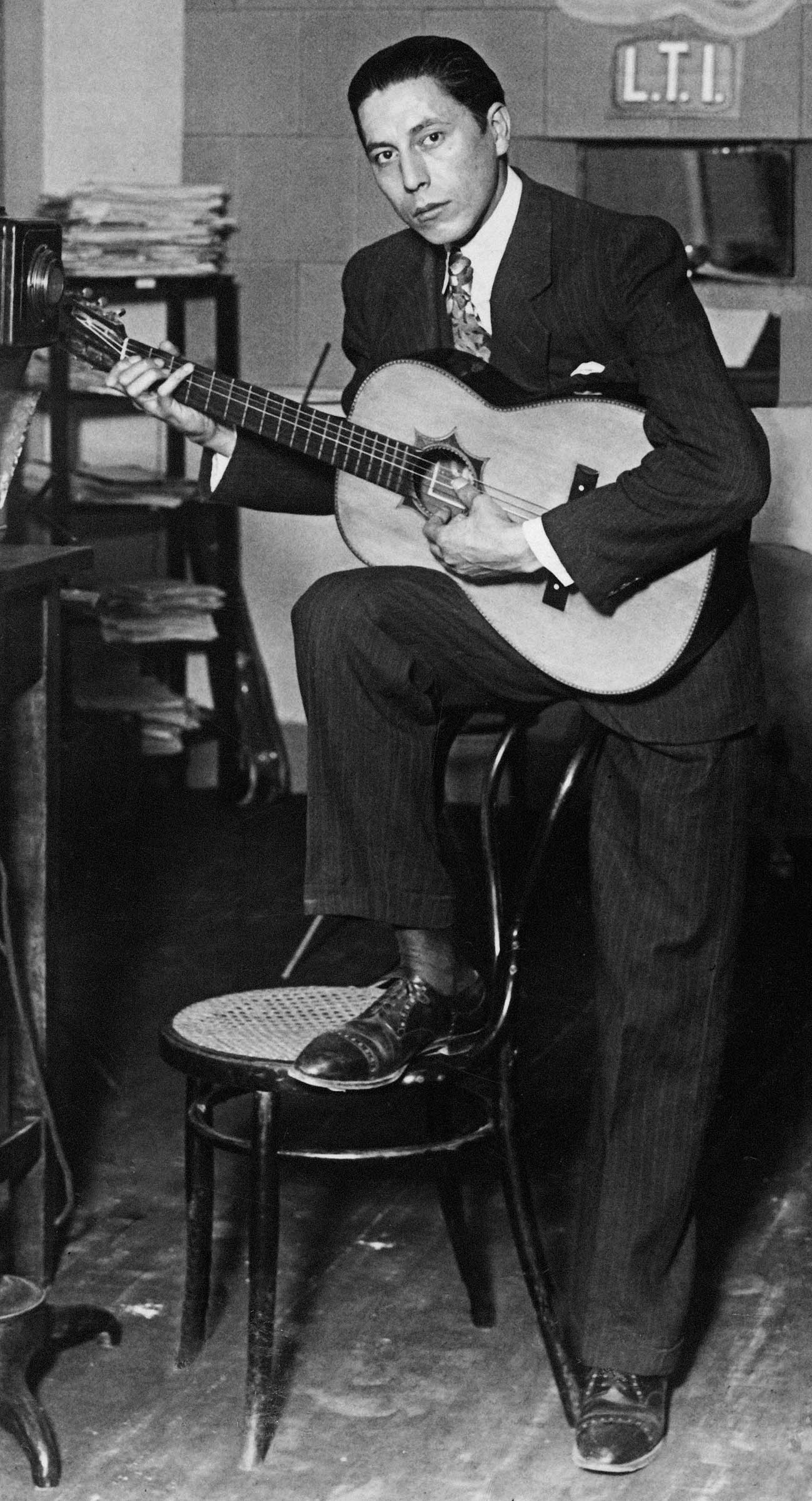
Atahualpa Yupanqui, 1934

Folk music—known as música folklórica or folklore in Spanish, from the English "folklore"—is a music genre that includes both traditional folk music and contemporary folk music, which emerged from the genre's 20th-century revival. Argentine folk music comes in many forms and has Indigenous, European, and African influences.

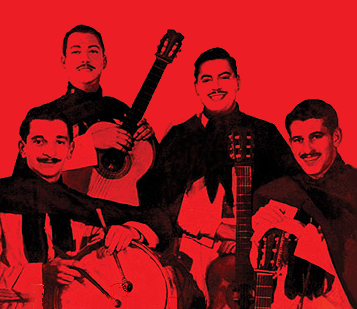
Los Chalchaleros quartet, 1958

In the late 50s, Argentina experienced a "folklore boom." Among the most influential groups of the time were Los Chalchaleros, from Salta; Los Fronterizos, also from Salta; and Los Hermanos Ábalos from Santiago del Estero. Composer Ariel Ramírez and guitarist Eduardo Falú were also notable figures during this period.

Between 1960 and 1974, Leda Valladares created a documentary series, known as the Mapa musical argentino ("Musical Map of Argentina"), taping traditional folk music throughout the country. The recordings she made were funded by the National Endowment of the Arts and directed by Litto Nebbia for Melopea Records.

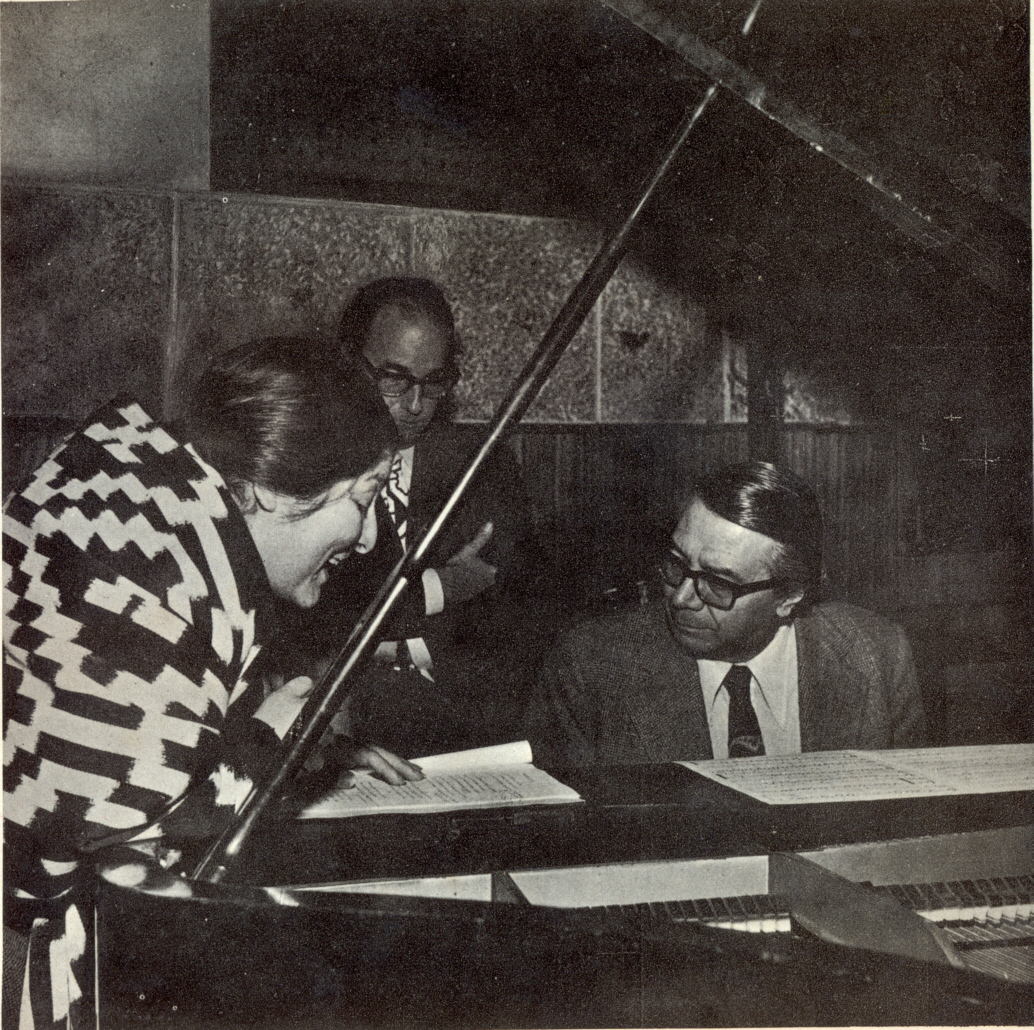
Ariel Ramírez (at piano), President of the Argentine Society of Authors and Composers, with eminent folklore vocalist Mercedes Sosa, 1972

The Nuevo Cancionero movement was officially codified in Argentina in February 1963 with the Manifiesto Fundacional de Nuevo Cancionero ("Foundational manifesto of the New Songbook"). It was written by Armando Tejada Gómez, with the collaboration of artists like Mercedes Sosa, Oscar Matus, Tito Francia, and Eduardo Aragón. Atahualpa Yupanqui was another important figure in the movement.

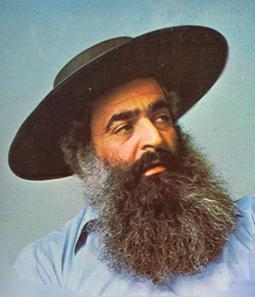
Musician and folklorist Jorge Cafrune was killed in a hit-and-run shortly after defying the military dictatorship.

The 1976 dictatorship created a difficult environment for folk music. The military censored, blacklisted, and prosecuted artists, and many received anonymous phone calls warning them: "o te callas o sos tierra de cementerio" ("either you shut up, or you're cemetery land"). Many artists left the country, and their music was not distributed in Argentina at the time. The repressive actions and black lists against artists and intellectuals to be kidnapped or censored were known as Operativo Claridad ("Operation Clarity").

The 1980s saw a resurgence of folk music after the Falklands War, which led to the fall of the dictatorship. Popular artists included Sixto Palavecino and Facundo Cabral.

Folk music continues to enjoy success in Argentina. Soledad "La Sole" Pastorutti brought folk music to a new audience at the end of the 20th century, and, in the early 21st century, Juana Molina has earned a cult following for her fusion of electronic music, folk music and ambient sounds. In 2004, the album Cantor de Cantores, by Horacio Guarany, was nominated for the Latin Grammy Award for Best Folk Album.

=== Notable folk music festivals ===
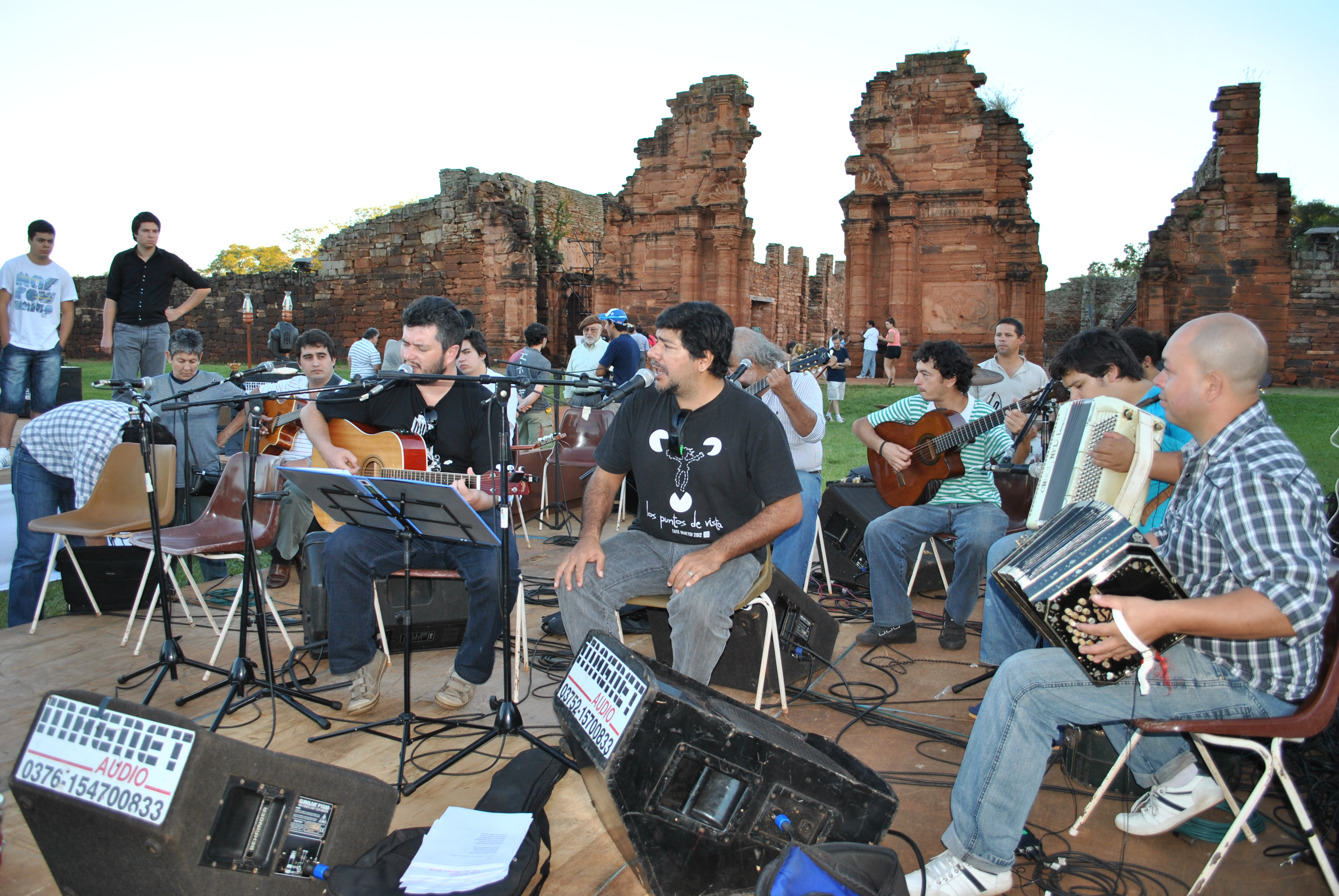
A group of Chamamé in San Ignacio, Misiones.

The Cosquín National Folklore Festival is an annual music festival held in Cosquín—a small town in Córdoba, Argentina. The festival first took place between 21 and 29 January 1961, and has grown to include musicians from across Argentina and neighboring countries. The principal focus of the festival is traditional folk music, but other genres are presented.

Though not an official partner, Cosquín en Japón ("Cosquín in Japan")—a three-day folk festival held in Kawamata, Fukushima, Japan—does derive its name from the Cosquín National Folklore Festival.

The Cosquín National Folklore Festival typically includes representatives from musical genres developed in Argentina and its surrounding areas, including:

- Baguala
- Bailecito
- Kaluyo
- Candombe
- Carnavalito
- Chacarera
- Chamarrita
- Chamamé
- Chaya
- Cifra
- Cielito
- Cogoyo
- La Condición
- Copla
- El Cuando
- Cumbia villera
- Décima
- Escondido
- Firmeza
- Gato
- Guaracha santiagueña
- Huella
- Huayno
- Malambo
- Media caña
- Milonga
- Murga
- Pala-Pala
- El Palito
- Payada
- Pericón
- Polka
- Rasguido doble
- Refalosa
- El Sombrerito
- Tango
- Nuevo tango
- Tonada
- Tristecito
- Triunfo
- Valsecito criollo
- Vidala
- Vidalita
- Yaraví
- Zamba

=== Variations of Argentine Folk Music By Region ===
==== Andean music ====
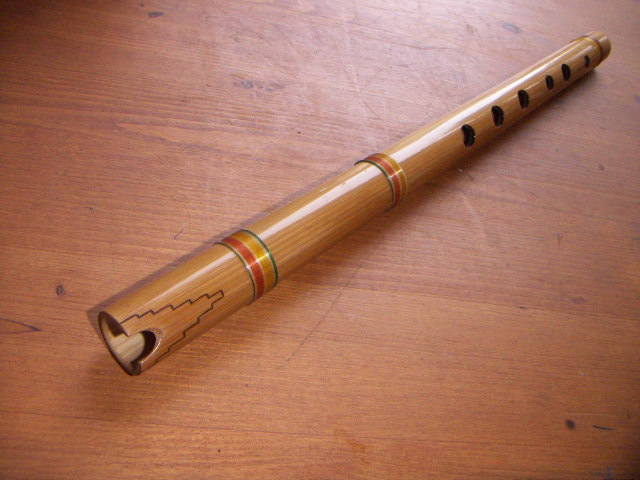
A quena, a traditional Andean instrument

Andean music refers to a group of Indigenous musical styles from the Andes. In Northern Argentina, tarkeada is a popular style played on wooden flutes.

Noted interpreters of Andean music include Jaime Torres, a charango player, and Micaela Chauque, a Qulla Argentine composer who specializes in the quena and siku.

Andean music has also been fused with other styles of music by musicians such as pianist Daniel Tinte and on songs such as "Cuando pase el temblor" by Soda Stereo and "Lamento boliviano" by Los Enanitos Verdes.

==== Chacarera ====
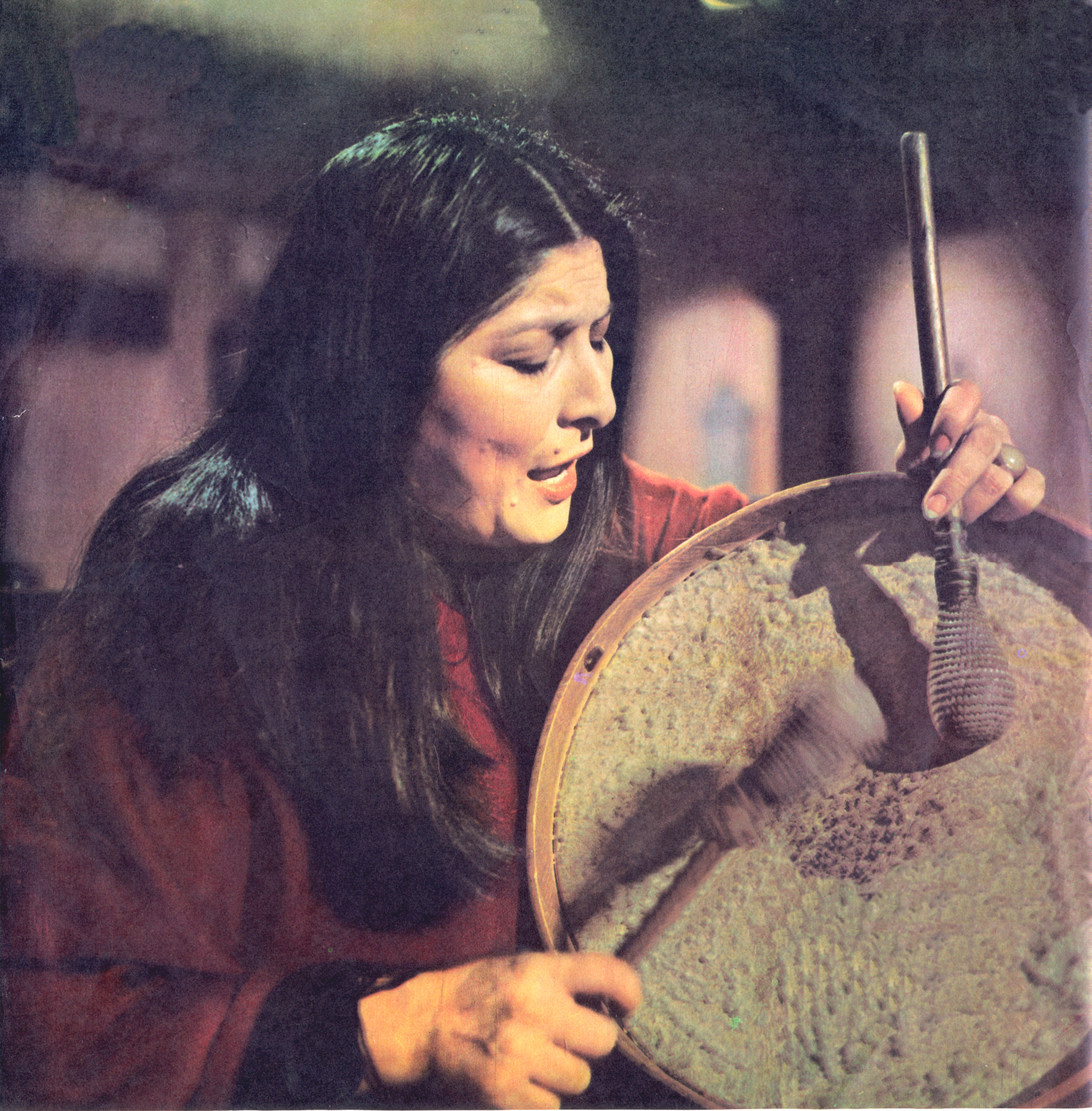
Folk singer Mercedes Sosa playing a bombo legüero, a traditional drum used in chacarera

Chacarera is a traditional folk dance and musical style developed in the rural northwest of Argentina, namely in Santiago del Estero, with both African and European influences. The name chacarera has its origins in the Andean term chacra, which refers to farms or agricultural fields. Some academics theorize that the dance developed as a tribute to the female workers of these farms.

The traditional instruments used in chacarera are guitars, violins and the bombo legüero.

In January, Santiago del Estero hosts the annual Festival Nacional de la Chacarera ("National Chacarera Festival"). The festival was founded in 1971 by folk musicians Agustín and Carlos Carabajal.

==== Chamamé ====
Chamamé is a traditional folk dance and musical style from northeast Argentina, with Corrientes often cited as the style's birthplace. It has Guaraní, Paraguayan, Spanish, and central European influences, and incorporates elements of popular dances from the 19th century, such as the waltz, mazurka, and Paraguayan polka.

The traditional instruments used in chamamé are the violin and vihuela. Guitars, harmonicas, accordions, bandoneons and double basses were later incorporated.

Notable chamamé musicians include Teresa Parodi, Raúl Barboza, Chango Spasiuk, Tránsito Cocomarola, Ramona Galarza, and Alejandro Brittes.

== Popular music ==
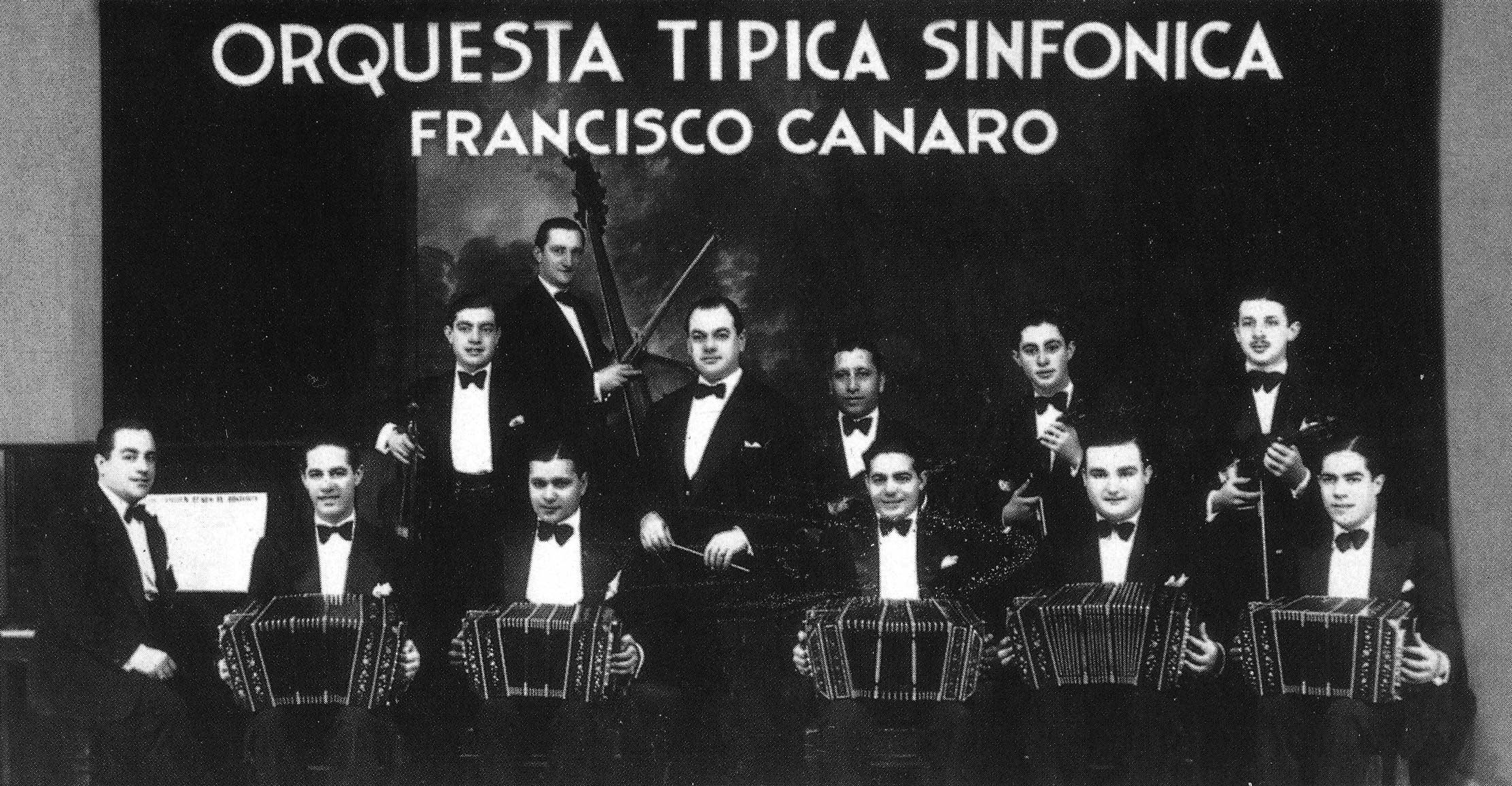
Francisco Canaro and his Tango Orchestra, circa 1930

=== Tango ===
Tango was developed in the bars and port areas of Buenos Aires, Argentina and Montevideo, Uruguay, by the cities' urban lower class. It emerged as a fusion of various styles of music from across the globe including European styles such as flamenco, minuet, polka, mazurka, and contradanza; Argentine and Uruguayan folk music, including candombe, payada and milonga (considered a precursor to tango); and sub-Saharan African influences.

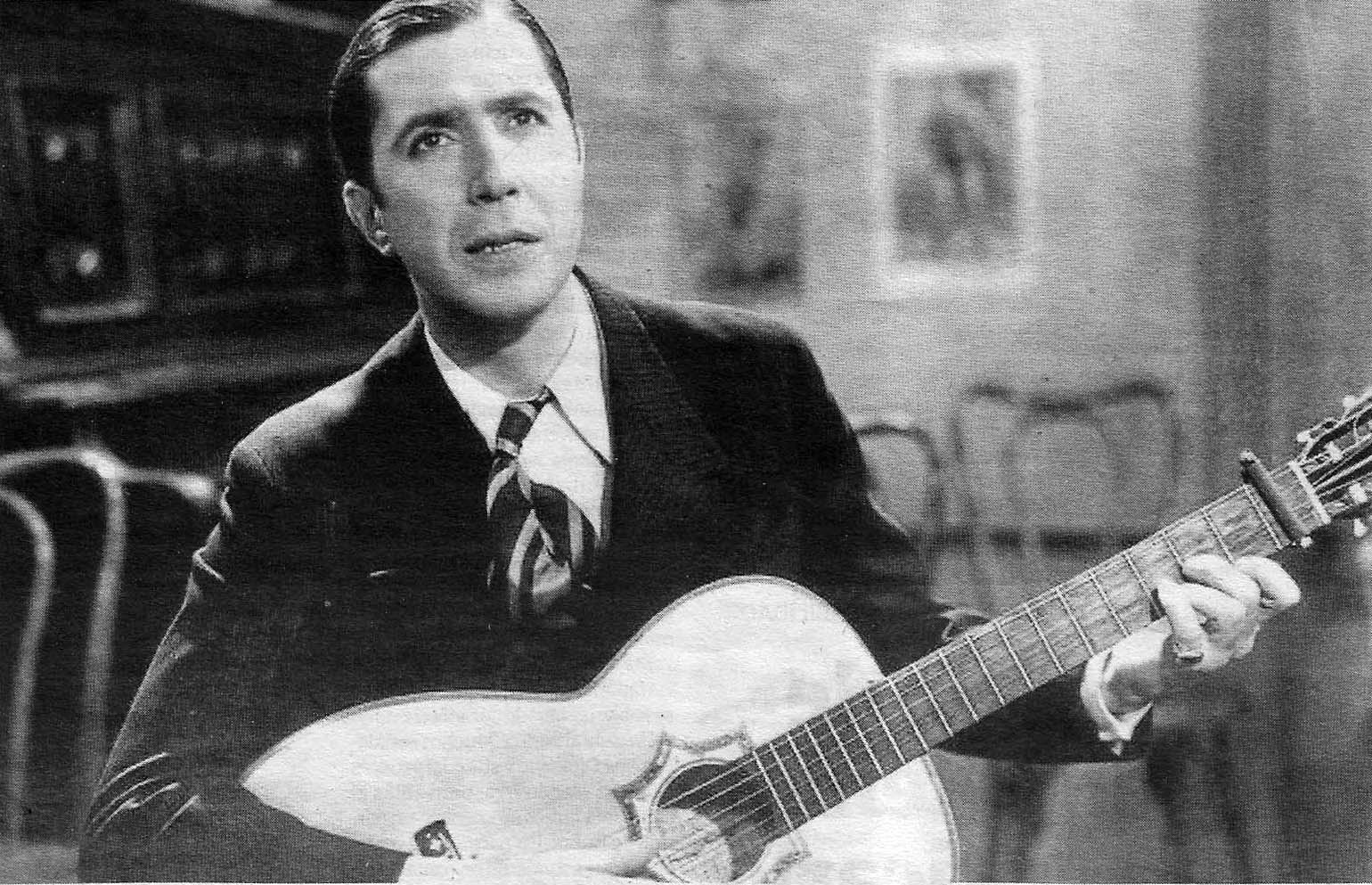
Vocalist Carlos Gardel brought tango to new audiences in the 1920s and 30s.

The Golden Age of tango is generally considered to have been from 1935 to 1952. At this time, tango was generally performed by large orchestral groups known as orquestas típicas, which typically featured over a dozen performers. Notable band leaders at the time included Francisco Canaro, Julio de Caro, Osvaldo Pugliese, Aníbal Troilo, Juan d'Arienzo, and Alfredo De Angelis. Notable vocalists from the era included Carlos Gardel, Roberto Goyeneche, Hugo del Carril, Tita Merello, Susana Rinaldi, Edmundo Rivero, and Ignacio Corsini.

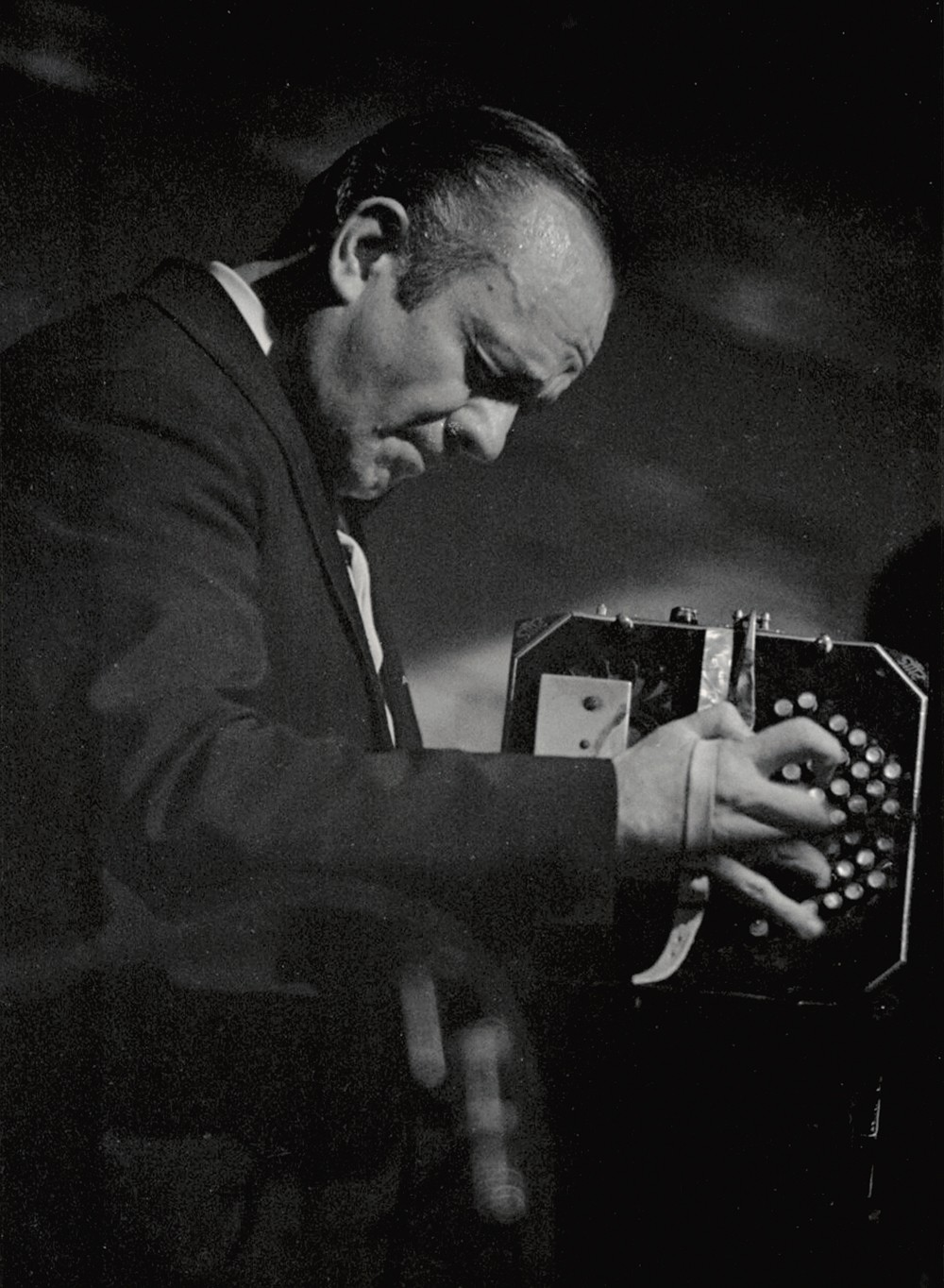
Astor Piazzolla

In the 1950s, Astor Piazzolla revolutionized tango with his nuevo tango, which incorporated elements of jazz and classical music. Though his innovations were initially scorned by traditionalists, Piazzolla's compositions eventually earned him widespread recognition and celebration. Many musicians who worked with Piazzolla went on to have their own successful careers, including violinist Antonio Agri; fellow bandoneón virtuosi José Libertella and Rodolfo Mederos; and pianists Horacio Salgán and Pablo Ziegler.

Today, tango continues to enjoy popularity on both a local and international level. Buenos Aires is home to both professional demonstrations and local gatherings at bars and community centers across the city, and hosts the annual Campeonato Mundial de Baile de Tango, typically in August. Groups like Tanghetto, Bajofondo, Gotan Project, and Típica Messiez bring both nuevo tango and traditional tango to new audiences.

Finnish tango, an established variation of the Argentine tango but whose rhythm follows the ballroom tango, is popular in Finland.

=== Rock Music ===
Rock music from Argentina, commonly known as Argentine rock or rock nacional ("national rock"), is one of the earliest incarnations of Spanish-language rock. Argentina was one of the major exporters of rock en español during the 1980s, with several Argentine acts achieving international success during the decade, including Soda Stereo, Virus, and Enanitos Verdes.

Subgenres of Argentine rock may include:

- Pop: Virus, Los Abuelos de la Nada, Fito Páez
- Ska: Los Fabulosos Cadillacs, Los Auténticos Decadentes, Todos Tus Muertos
- Reggae: Los Pericos, Lumumba, Dread Mar-I
- Folk rock: Sui Generis, Las Pastillas del Abuelo, Pedro y Pablo, León Gieco
- Blues: Manal, Memphis La Blusera
- Hardcore: Fun People, Nueva Ética
- English-language: Sumo, Triddana, Maxi Trusso, Siamés

==== 1960s ====
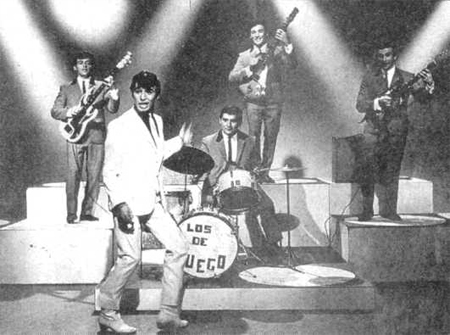
Sandro y Los de Fuego was heavily influenced by Elvis Presley.

Early Argentine rock and roll was heavily influenced by Anglophone artists. Singer and actor Sandro initially styled himself after Elvis Presley, and even earned the nickname "the Argentine Elvis." His music is often considered a precursor to Argentine rock. At the same time, the variety show El Club del Clan hoped to compete in the domestic rock and roll market by offering young people a mixture of pop music, rock and roll, bolero and cumbia. The show was extremely popular and turned its cast—including Palito Ortega, Leo Dan, Billy Caffaro, Violeta Rivas, and Cachita Galán—into the first national teen idols. Both Sandro and El Club del Clan offered young Argentines the opportunity to listen to rock and roll in Spanish at a time when the market was dominated by music in English.

Beatlemania reached Argentina during the early 1960s and inspired many local cover bands who sang predominately in English. A definitive shift occurred with Los Gatos' 1967 single "La balsa," which established the distinctive sound and emphasis of Spanish-language lyrics that have defined Argentine rock. The 1960s also saw the rise of groups like Almendra, Vox Dei, Manal, and Pedro y Pablo, and singer-songwriters like Tanguito, Moris, and Javier Martinez.

==== 1970s ====
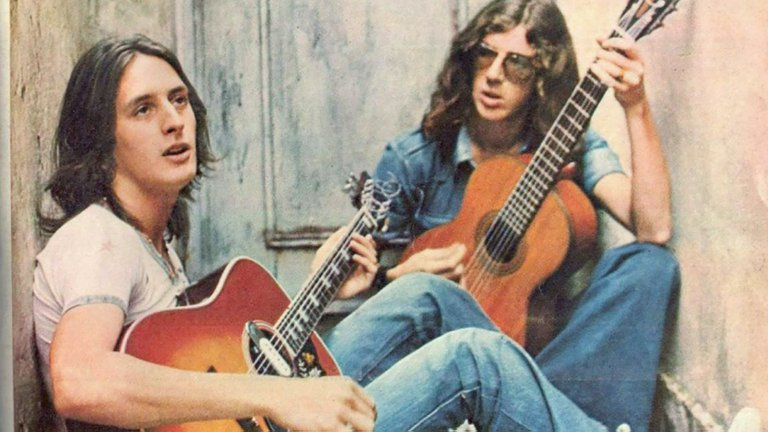
Sui Generis

By 1970, Argentine rock had become established among middle-class youth with groups like Almendra, Pescado Rabioso, Color Humano, Arco Iris, Sui Generis, and Serú Girán.

Band lineups were often tenuous, with members frequently leaving or dissolving bands and forming new ones. Notable examples include Luis Alberto Spinetta, who founded Almendra, Pescado Rabioso, and Invisible during the decade, and would form additional bands during the 80s, and Charly García, who formed part of Sui Generis, PorSuiGieco, La Máquina de Hacer Pájaros, and Serú Girán over the course of the 1970s.

Artists often faced pushback from the military dictatorship, and were often forced to censor their music, or use metaphors to bypass the government.

==== 1980s and 90s ====
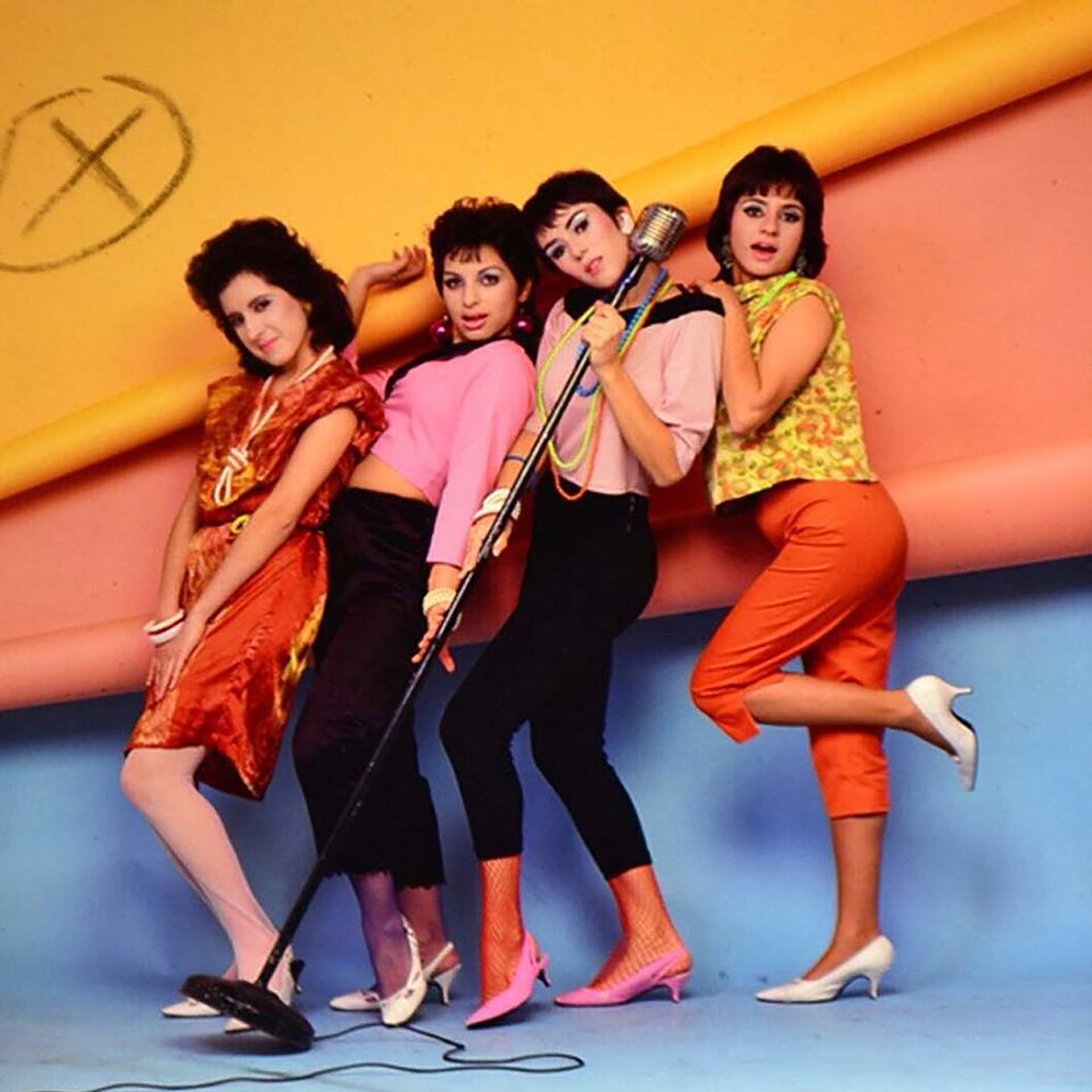
Viuda e hijas de Roque Enroll were part of a wave of música divertida that became popular in Argentina after the fall of the dictatorship.

During the Falklands War, the dictatorship banned music in English from playing on the radio, giving Argentine musicians additional exposure on the airwaves. This, paired with the fall of the dictatorship in 1983, allowed Argentine rock to grow and reach new audiences in Argentina and abroad. Several Argentine groups were able to achieve international recognition during this period, and were featured in the Rock en tu idioma ("Rock in your language") publicity campaign.

In the 80s, Argentine rock moved away from the folk style that had dominated the 70s and embraced new production styles and irreverent sounds and lyrics with groups like Soda Stereo, Virus, Los Twists, Viuda e hijas de Roque Enroll, and Los Abuelos de la Nada gaining popularity. Of course, this música divertida ("fun music") wasn't the only music being created during the decade. Sumo, Los Fabulosos Cadillacs and Todos Tus Muertos brought ska influences into the fold; Riff, La Torre, V8, and Rata Blanca were all notable heavy metal bands; and rock rolinga, a style heavily influenced by The Rolling Stones, was popular with groups like Los Ratones Paranoicos. Other important acts included Charly García (now a successful solo artist), Fabiana Cantilo, Celeste Carballo, Sandra Mihanovich, Los Violadores, and Patricio Rey y sus Redonditos de Ricota.

Like the 1980s, the 1990s saw a continued diversification of influences in Argentine rock. Heavy metal bands like A.N.I.M.A.L., Tren Loco, and Horcas gained more mainstream success; Fito Páez and Los Rodríguez achieved popularity with pop-influenced styles; and Iguana Lovers and Babasónicos were important groups of the movida sónica ("sonic movement"), which was a local interpretation of alternative rock.

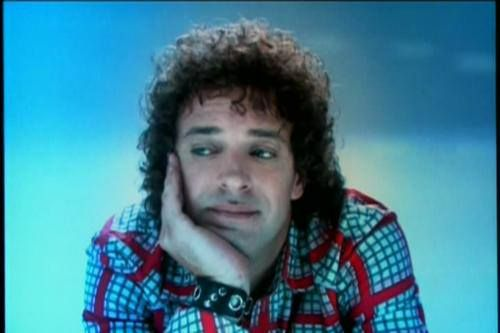
After the separation of Soda Stereo in 1997, Gustavo Cerati launched a successful solo career in the 90s and 2000s.

==== 2000s–present ====
While rock is no longer the dominant genre in Argentina, it continues to play an important role in Argentine national identity. Graffiti of influential artists like Luis Alberto Spinetta, Charly García, and Gustavo Cerati can be spotted around Buenos Aires, and the Cosquín Rock music festival has brought local and international acts to Cosquín, Córdoba since 2001.

Notable acts have included: Él Mató a un Policía Motorizado, Airbag, Árbol, Los Espíritus, Marilina Bertoldi, Eruca Sativa, Fidel Nadal, Tersivel, and Triddana.

=== Electronic ===
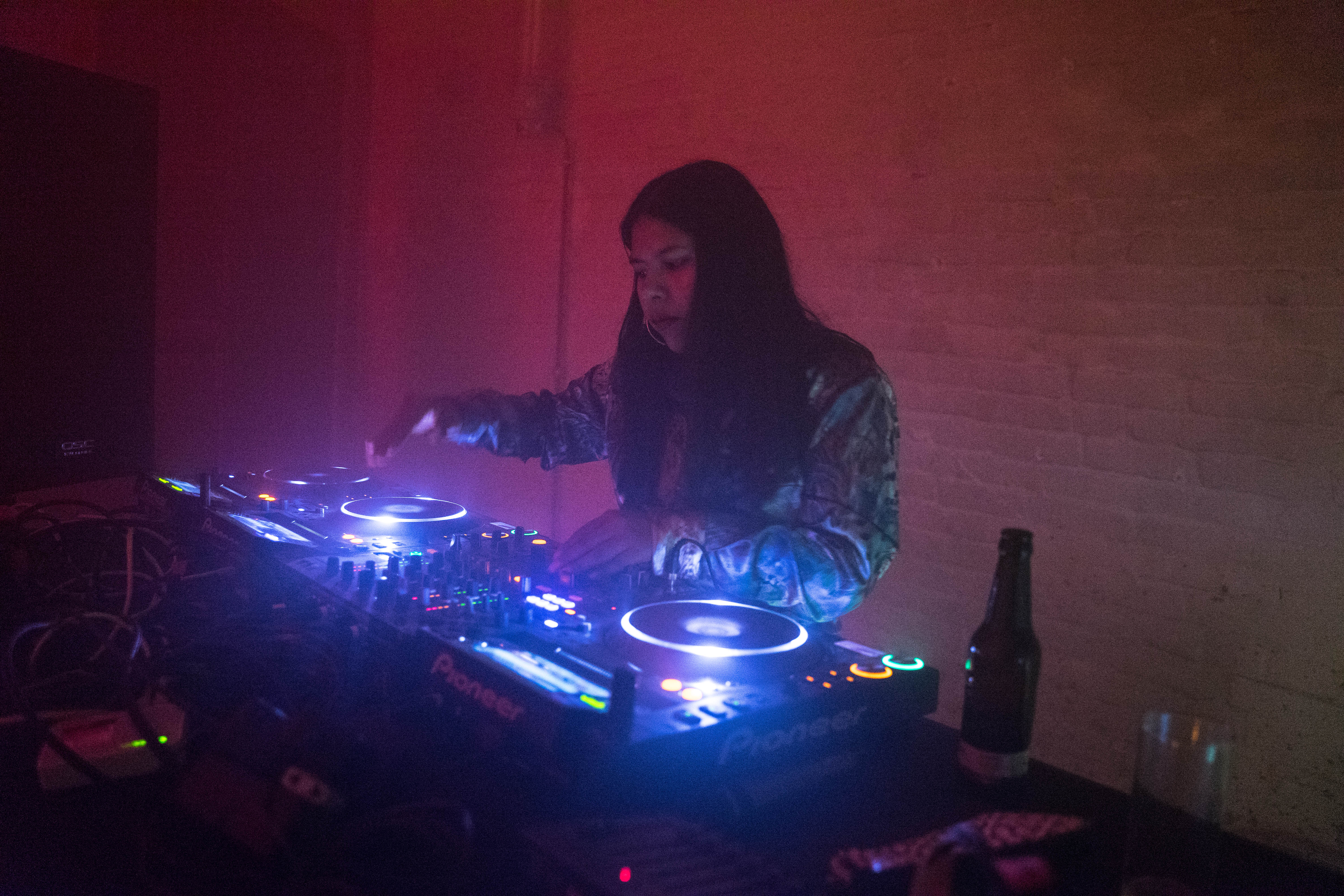
Argentine DJ and producer Tayhana

Rock musician Gustavo Cerati helped pioneer electronica in South America during the 80s and 90s, and the genre heavily influenced his 1999 album Bocanada. The genre continued to grow during the 2000s and many artists gained local notoriety at the Zizek Club nights at the Niceto Club in Buenos Aires. After three years, the club nights evolved into ZZK Records, an independent record label that helped pioneer electro-folklore in Latin America, with a focus on cumbia fusion.

Argentina has also been home to the annual electronic music festival Creamfields BA.

Electronic artists from Argentina include DJ Hernán Cattáneo; indietronica band Entre Ríos; electropop band Miranda!; tango fusion bands Bajofondo Tango Club and the Gotan Project; cumbia fusion artists Faauna and El Remolón; Heatbeat; and DJ and producer Tayhana.

=== Pop ===
Notable Argentine pop artists include Miranda!, Lali and Tini.

==== 1950s–1960s ====
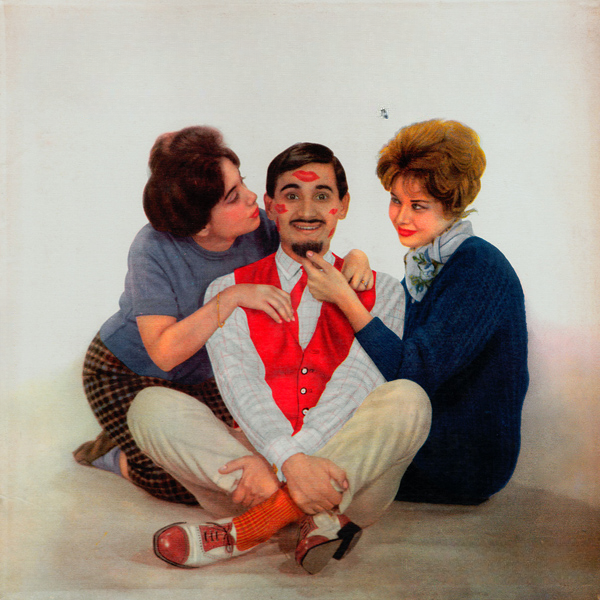
Billy Cafaro's cover of Paul Anka's "Pity Pity" sold 300,000 copies in 1960.

In the postwar era, pop music in Argentina was significantly influenced by American and English musicians. During the 1950s and 1960s, the "la nueva ola" movement emerged, marking the rise of youth-oriented pop music in South America. Musicians often adapted popular English-language songs into Spanish, appealing to audiences across the country. Notable early pop performers from this period included Billy Cafaro, Violeta Rivas, and Palito Ortega.

==== 1970s–1980s ====
During the 1970s and 1980s, several Argentine rock bands embraced elements of pop, contributing to the emergence of the "música divertida" ("fun music") movement. Bands like Los Twist, Viuda e hijas de Roque Enroll, and Los Abuelos de la Nada integrated catchy choruses and danceable rhythms into their music. Additionally, the cumbia pop group Las Primas gained popularity with songs like "Saca la Mano, Antonio", further diversifying the Argentine pop landscape.

==== 1990s–2000s ====
The 1990s and 2000s saw the rise of pop groups that significantly influenced the Argentine music scene. Groups such as Miranda!, Bandana, Mambrú, Erreway, Teen Angels and Tan Biónica contributed to the landscape of Argentine pop music.

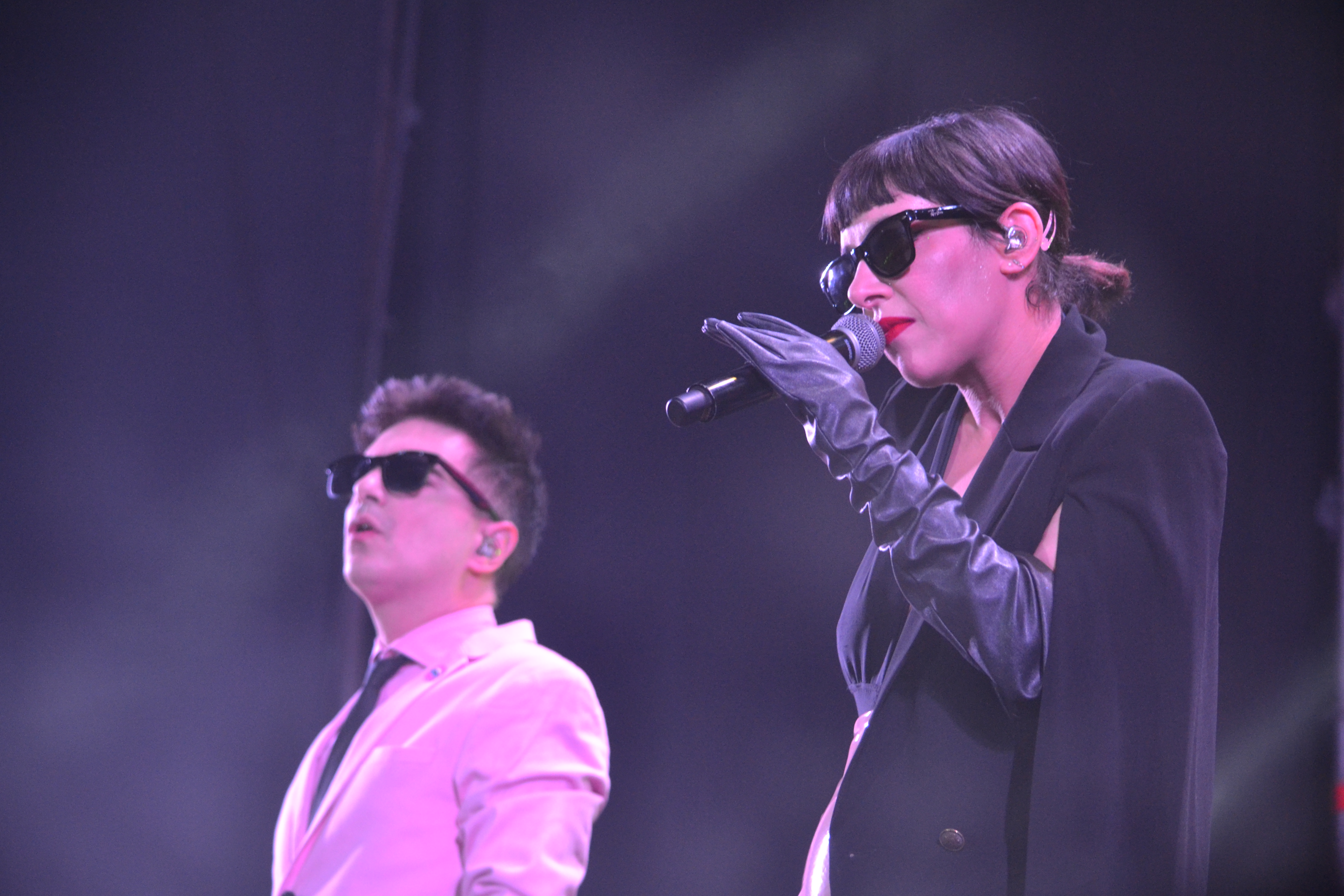
Miranda!, 2020

Miranda! became a stand out in Argentine pop music, pushing boundaries and redefining the genre. Formed in 2001, the band, consisting of Ale Sergi, Juliana Gattas, and Lolo Fuentes, notably, quickly rose to fame with their catchy melodies, playful lyrics, and infectious energy. Their debut album, Es Mentira, (2002), gained commercial success and introduced their blend of electronic beats and pop melodies. Subsequent albums like Sin Restricciones (2004) and El Disco de Tu Corazón (2007), reinforced their presence in the industry. Miranda! achieved numerous awards and accolades, including multiple Gardel Awards, highlighting their impact on the genre.

Following the success of global girl groups like the Spice Girls, Bandana was formed through the reality television show Popstars and became one of Argentina's best-selling groups in the early 2000s. Their performances and catchy songs appealed to teenage girls across the nation. Similarly, Erreway in the early 2000s and Teen Angels in the late 2000s, spawned from the television shows Rebelde Way and Casi Ángeles respectively, achieved national and international recognition, selling records and attracting significant youth followings.

Notable solo artists during this era include Axel, Alejandro Lerner, Diego Torres, and the Uruguayan Natalia Oreiro.

==== 2010s–present ====
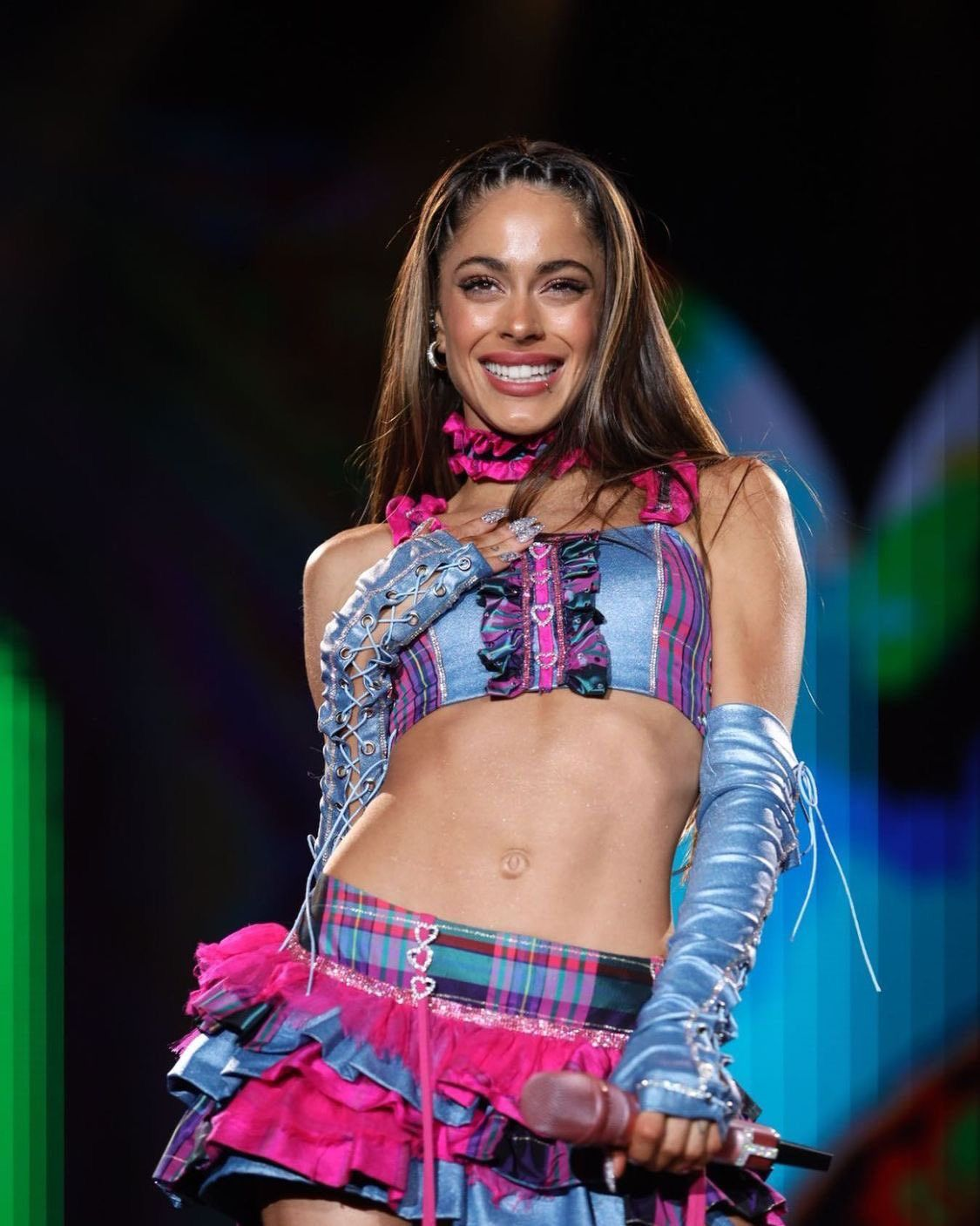
TINI performing in 2022

Since her transition from a Disney teen idol to a solo artist, Tini has played a pivotal role in the internationalization of contemporary Argentine pop. She is often cited by critics as the artist who bridged the gap between traditional pop and the burgeoning urbano scene, helping to establish Argentina as a powerhouse in the global Latin music market.

In 2015, Tini became the first Argentine artist to sign with Hollywood Records, a move that facilitated her crossover into European and North American markets. Her self-titled debut album (2016) reached the top 10 in countries such as Italy, Germany, and Austria, showcasing a global reach uncommon for Argentine soloists at the time.

Her influence is also measured by her high-profile international collaborations, which have linked the Argentine scene with global stars. She has recorded with artists such as Coldplay (performing on Saturday Night Live in 2024 and their shows at Hard Rock Stadium in Miami and Croke Park in Dublin), Christina Aguilera, Alejandro Sanz, Ricky Martin, and Steve Aoki, effectively acting as a cultural ambassador for Argentine music in diverse genres.

As of 2026, she remains one of the most-streamed Argentine female artists on platforms like Spotify and YouTube, serving as a blueprint for the "new generation" of Argentine pop stars including Maria Becerra, Emilia, and Nicki Nicole.

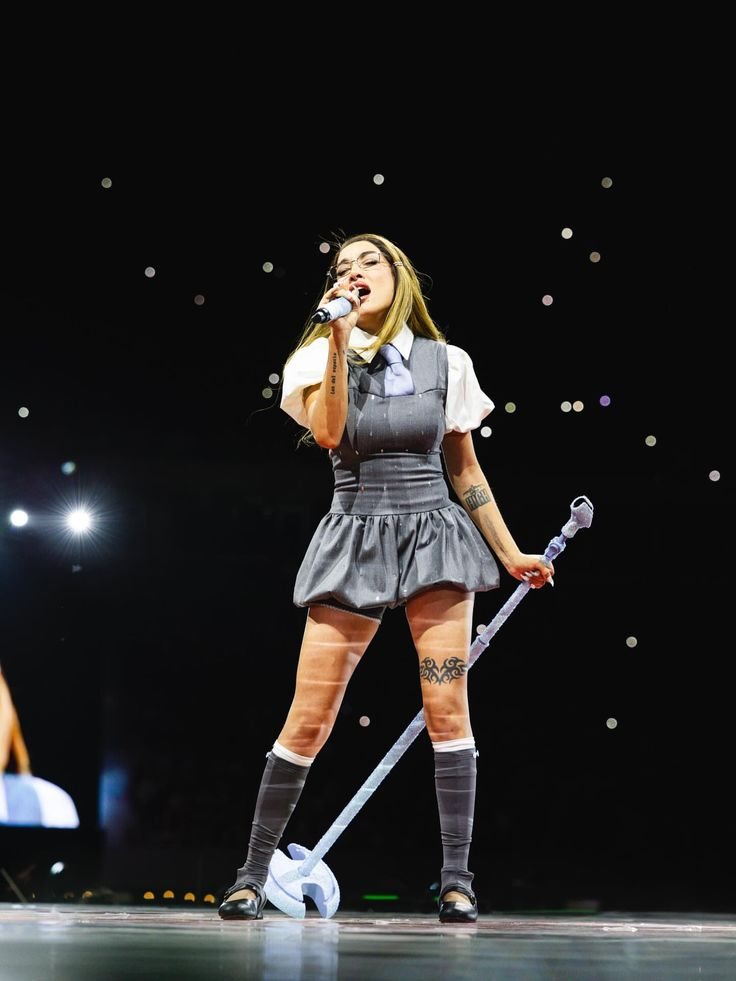
Maria Becerra performing at the River Plate Stadium

In the early 2020s, Maria Becerra emerged as a central figure in the global expansion of the Argentine urban-pop scene. Transitioning from a successful career as a YouTuber to a music powerhouse, her impact is characterized by massive digital consumption and historic live performances.

In March 2024, Becerra became the first Argentine female artist to sell out the River Plate Stadium, performing two consecutive shows for over 130,000 fans. By late 2025, she broke her own record by announcing a 360° show at the same venue, solidifying her status as a stadium-level act.

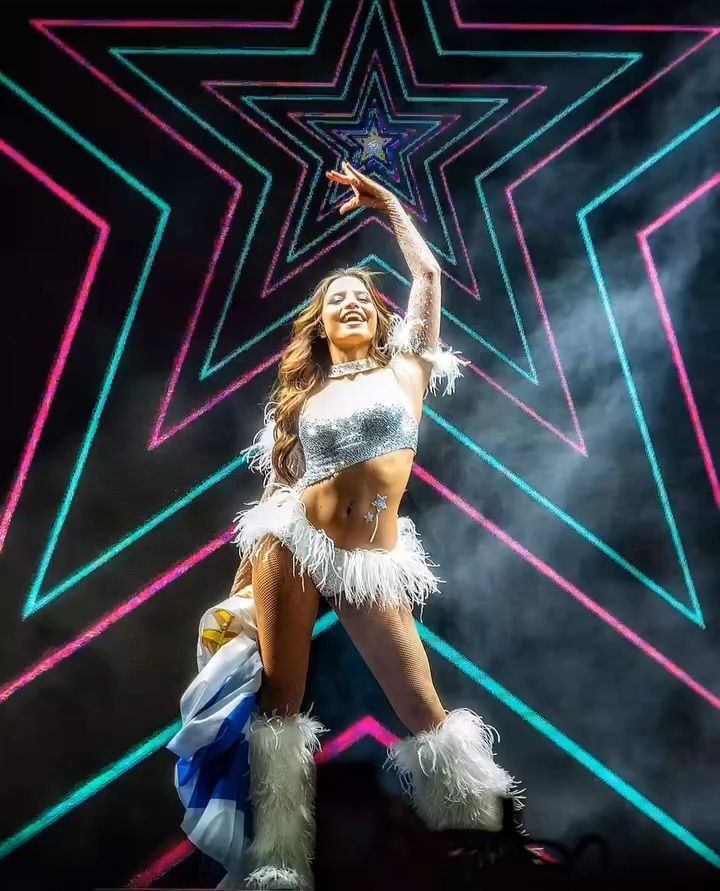
Emilia performing at her .mp3 Tour

Emilia has become a leading icon of the 2020s pop revival, specifically noted for her role in bringing 1990s and early 2000s aesthetics back to the mainstream.

Her second studio album, .mp3 (2023), debuted as the No. 1 global female album on Spotify, reaching the top 5 of the Global Album Debut chart. This era was marked by a record-breaking string of 10 sold-out shows at the Movistar Arena in Buenos Aires, all sold out within 10 hours, followed by massive stadium dates at Sarsfield.

In this decade, Lali, reaffirmed her status as a pioneer of Argentine pop by spearheading a sonic evolution inspired by the 80s and 90s ballroom and dance scenes. Her impact during this decade is defined by her massive cultural presence and record-breaking live performances. Lali launched her sixth studio album, No Vayas a Atender Cuando El Demonio Llama, in 2025, that same year between May and December, Lali became the first Argentine female act to sell out the Velez Sarfield Stadium six times in a single year, totaling over 250,000 attendees. In June 2026, she will perform two back-to-back sold-out shows at the River Plate Stadium.

=== Cuarteto ===
Cuarteto, sometimes known as cuartetazo, is a form of dance music from Córdoba, Argentina, that is similar to merengue. The word cuarteto translates to "quartet" in English—the genre got its name from the Cuarteto Característico Leo, a quartet which is credited with inventing the genre.

Cuarteto has been part of Argentina's musical heritage since the 1940s and underwent a significant revival in the 1980s and 90s. Notable acts during this period were La Mona Jiménez and Rodrigo.

Other notable groups include Tru-la-lá, Chébere, el Cuarteto de Oro, and el Cuarteto Berna.

=== Cumbia ===
Cumbia is a style of music that blends African, Indigenous, and European influences. Argentine cumbia is derived from Colombian cumbia, which is identified by its heavy use of drums and its signature double beat.

Cumbia came to Argentina in the mid-50s. Some of the earliest groups to gain success were the Colombian group Cuarteto Imperial and the multinational group Los Wawancó, whose early members came to Argentina to attend university. Cumbia continued to enjoy success in the 70s and 80s as part of the "movida tropical" ("tropical movement") in popular music.

Santa Fe, Argentina has been a stronghold of Argentine cumbia and has developed its own style known as cumbia santafesina, which is identified by its distinctive accordion usage. Santa Fe has, additionally, declared 5 November as Día de la Cumbia Santafesina ("day of cumbia santafesina"), in honor of Martín Robustiano "Chani" Gutiérrez (26 April 1944 – 5 November 1992) who was a driving force behind the genre's growth.

Cumbia's mainstream breakthrough came in the 1990s, with the development of cumbia villera ("slum cumbia") in the poor neighborhoods of Buenos Aires—it is a genre heavily influenced by Peruvian cumbia, colloquially known as chicha, which uses electric guitars and synthesizers. Argentina was facing a great depression at the time, and the genre's depictions of life in poor neighborhoods and recurring themes of sex, crime, drugs, and police violence appealed to Argentine youth. Notable acts include Amar Azul, Flor de Piedra, Damas Gratis, Piola Vago, Yerba Brava, and Pibes Chorros.

In the mid-2010s, cumbia cheta, also known as cumbia pop, gained popularity in Argentina and abroad with groups like Los Bonnitos and Agapornis. Cachengue, a form of Argentine cumbia heavily influenced by reggaeton, also gained popularity during this decade.

Other notable acts include: Leo Mattioli, Gilda, Ráfaga, La Base Musical, Los Palmeras, Los del Fuego, La Nueva Luna, Amar Azul, Mala Fama, Jambao, Antonio Ríos, Daniel Agostini, Karina, Dalila, and Mario Pereyra y su Banda.

== Urbano music ==
Urbano music (Spanish: música urbana) derives its name from its English-language counterpart urban music. Like urban music, urbano covers a range of genres and styles, many with Black roots or influences, such as trap, dembow, and reggaeton.

=== RKT ===
RKT—also known as Cachengue, cumbiatón, onda turra or cumbia turra—is a form of Argentine cumbia that is heavily influenced by cumbia villera and reggaeton. The genre emerged in San Martín, Buenos Aires during the 2000s and became popular in Argentina during the 2010s with artists such Los Wachiturros and Nene Malo. The genre has spread to other countries, including Bolivia, Chile and Uruguay. DJ Fer Palacio has made a name for himself by remixing reggaeton songs with elements of cachengue.

A recent subgenre of cachengue is cumbia 420, which is strongly affiliated with cannabis culture. It first gained popular recognition in the early 2020s, with two singles released by L-Gante: "L-Gante Rkt" with producer Papu DJ and "L-Gante: Bzrp Music Sessions, Vol. 38," with Bizarrap, which was the first Bzrp Music Sessions to reach number-one on the Billboard Argentina Hot 100.

=== Trap ===
Trap is a subgenre of rap that developed in the early 2000s in Atlanta, Georgia in the Southern United States. The genre derives its name from trap houses, where drug dealers sell illegal narcotics, and is influenced by G-funk, house, and techno.

Trap first gained popularity in Argentina through freestyle rap battles like El Quinto Escalón, which was first held in March 2012 at Rivadavia park in Buenos Aires. Argentine rapper Duki won at El Quinto Escalón in 2016 and his song, "No Vendo Trap," became the first in the battle's history to hit 1 million views on YouTube. Other artists who got their start at these battles include Nicki Nicole, Trueno, Ecko, Tiago PZK, and Paulo Londra. Producer and DJ Bizarrap got his start uploading compilations of these freestyle battles onto his Youtube channel.

== Art music ==
=== Jazz ===
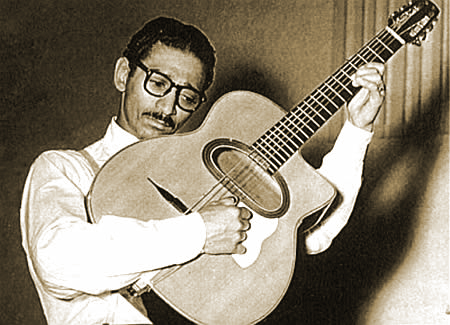
Jazz guitarist Oscar Alemán

Jazz is an American music genre that originated in the Black communities of New Orleans, Louisiana, in the United States. Jazz is characterized by swing and blue notes, complex chords, call-and-response vocals, polyrhythms and improvisation.

==== Early days ====
Like much of the world, jazz was first introduced to Argentina in the 1920s and 30s. The 1930s and 40s additionally saw a number of publications dedicated to jazz such as Síncopa y Ritmo, Swing, and Jazz Magazine.

The most notable Argentine jazz musician from this period was guitarist Oscar Alemán, who played with the likes of Josephine Baker, Django Reinhardt, Louis Armstrong, and Duke Ellington.

==== 1950s ====
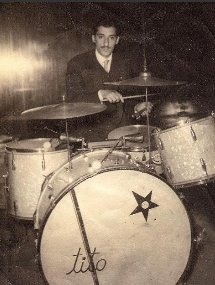
Tito Alberti, 1957

Jazz drummer Tito Alberti founded the Jazz Casino orchestra in 1950. Jazz Casino toured internationally and was known for its fusion of jazz, melódicos, and tropical music. Alberti's eldest son—Charly Alberti—is best known as the drummer of Soda Stereo.

During the 1950s, Astor Piazzolla introduced nuevo tango to the world, and began to incorporate jazz and classical music elements into his tango compositions.

Lalo Schifrin began his career during this decade.

==== 1960s ====
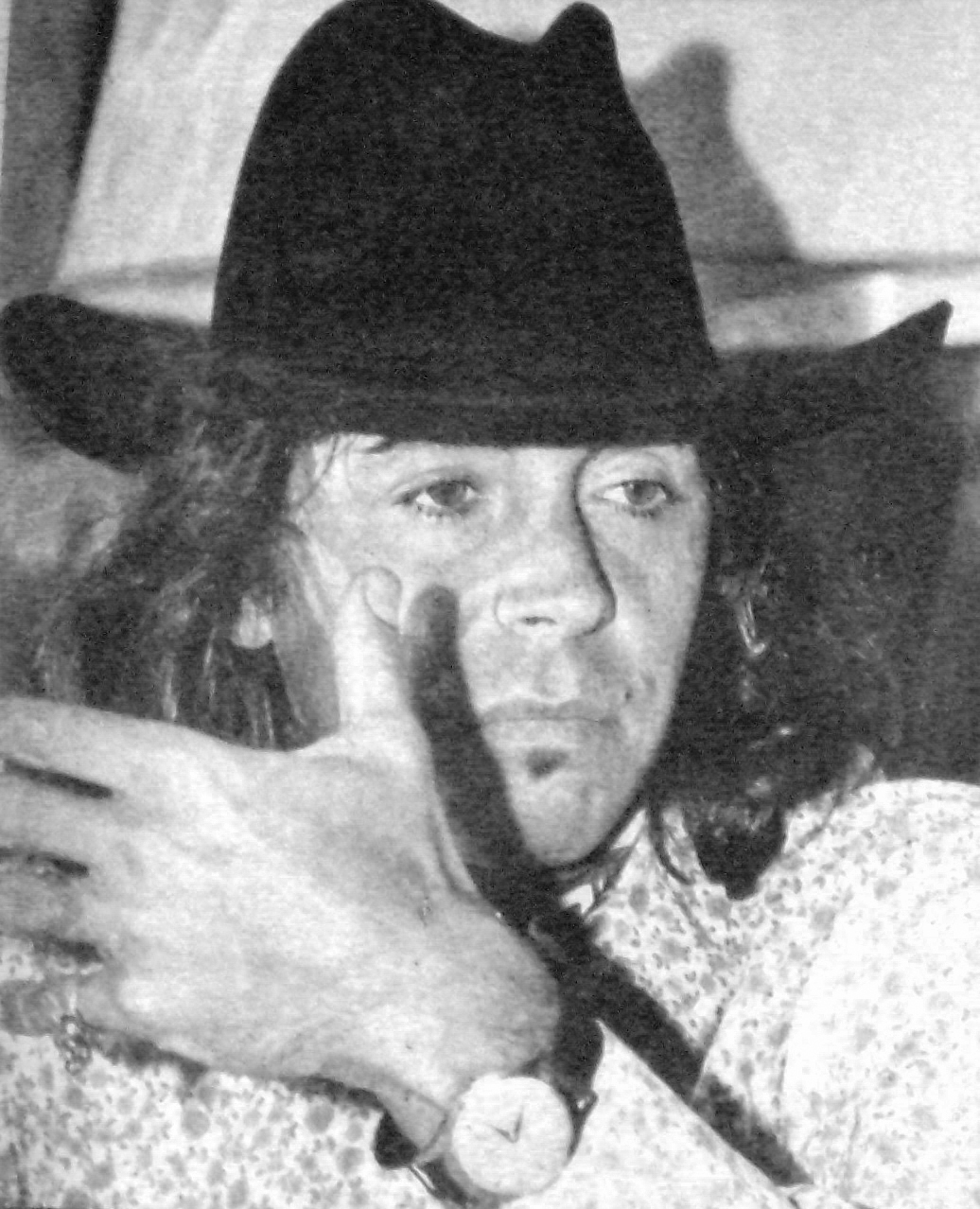
Gato Barbieri, 1970

Jazz tenor saxophonist Leandro "Gato" Barbieri first came to fame during the free jazz movement in the 1960s, and his work with artists like Don Cherry, Charlie Haden, and Carla Bley. Barbieri would later move to the Latin jazz movement in the 1970s.

==== 1970s ====
Jazz fusion gained traction during the later part of the decade. Influenced by the work of Astor Piazzolla, among others, Rodolfo Mederos released Fuera de broma in 1976. The album fused jazz, tango, folk, and rock. On the back cover of the album, Rodolfo wrote that:

A friend once told me, referring to all those musicians who fear 'contaminating' themselves with other music: 'Every border that prevents entry, also prevents departure.' I always remembered that. My modus operandi was for a time tango. One day I felt as though I were touching a limit. I realized that I had reached a threshold, and from then on I would either stay inside or try to get out by expanding it, growing. I recalled that issue of the borders. I reviewed then, carefully, my relationship with all music and I understood that, without a doubt, I enjoyed, in some way, certain aspects of jazz, of rock, of soul, of 'pop' music, and obviously tango in its new forms (Astor Piazzolla), and some traditional forms (O. Pugliese, H. Salgán). I got to work with joy and without preconceptions. Later, I thought in the group that should play this music and, in this natural way, arose the idea of the bandoneon block and rhythm section. Then I added the color of the saxophone and flute, and it was set. We rehearsed, performed live and recorded this LP. I made sure we all liked it and that we had fun and I somehow understood that we had taken a step beyond the famous limit. 'Generación Cero' does not exist today as an established group, but it leaves this document for the consideration of those who also feel the need to expand those limits, their own limits."

Mederos has enjoyed critical success during his career and has toured internationally; worked with the likes of Astor Piazzolla, Mercedes Sosa, and Joan Manuel Serrat; and composed music for several films and stage plays. His group, Generación Cero, continues to perform, though with different musicians and instrumentation.

Other notable musicians who came to prominence during the decade are Pocho Lapouble and Dino Saluzzi.

==== 1980spresent ====
Alto saxophonist Andrés Boiarsky gained prominence for his contributions to the score of the 1986 film Hombre mirando al sudeste. Melopea Discos—a record label founded by Argentine musician Litto Nebbia—was founded in the 1980s and has distributed a number of jazz albums from both Argentine and international artists.

Today, there are jazz clubs across the nation's capital. Buenos Aires is also home to the annual Jazzología jazz festival, established by Carlos Inzillo in 1984 and one of the country's longest-running music festivals; The Festival Internacional de Jazz Django Argentina ("International Django Jazz Festival Argentina"), established in 2003 as part of the Jazzología jazz festival; and the Festival Internacional Buenos Aires Jazz ("Buenos Aires International Jazz Festival").

=== Classical music ===
The Buenos Aires Philharmonic Orchestra performing in Mar del Plata during its first season (1947)

The Orquesta Filarmónica de Buenos Aires ("Buenos Aires Philharmonic") was established in 1946 under the name Orquesta Sinfónica del Teatro Municipal ("Municipal Theater Symphony Orchestra"). It was the first official, exclusively symphonic, orchestra of the city of Buenos Aires, and was housed in the Teatro Municipal. The orchestra was moved to the Teatro Colón in 1953, and was renamed the Orquesta Filarmónica de Buenos Aires in 1958. The Orchestra has toured internationally, and performed with established national and international soloists, including Astor Piazzolla, Martha Argerich, Paco de Lucía, Luciano Pavarotti, Yehudi Menuhin, Itzkak Perlman, and Joshua Bell. Enrique Diemecke has led the orchestra since 2007.

Another prominent orchestra is the Orquesta Sinfónica Nacional ("Argentine National Symphony Orchestra"), founded in 1948 as the Orquesta Sinfónica del Estado. The Orquesta Sinfónica Nacional has toured internationally and won several distinctions within Argentina, including the Asociación de Críticos Musicales de la Argentina's award for "Best Orchestra" for the 1996, 2000 and 2002 seasons. Pedro Ignacio Calderón lead the orchestra from 1994 to 2015.

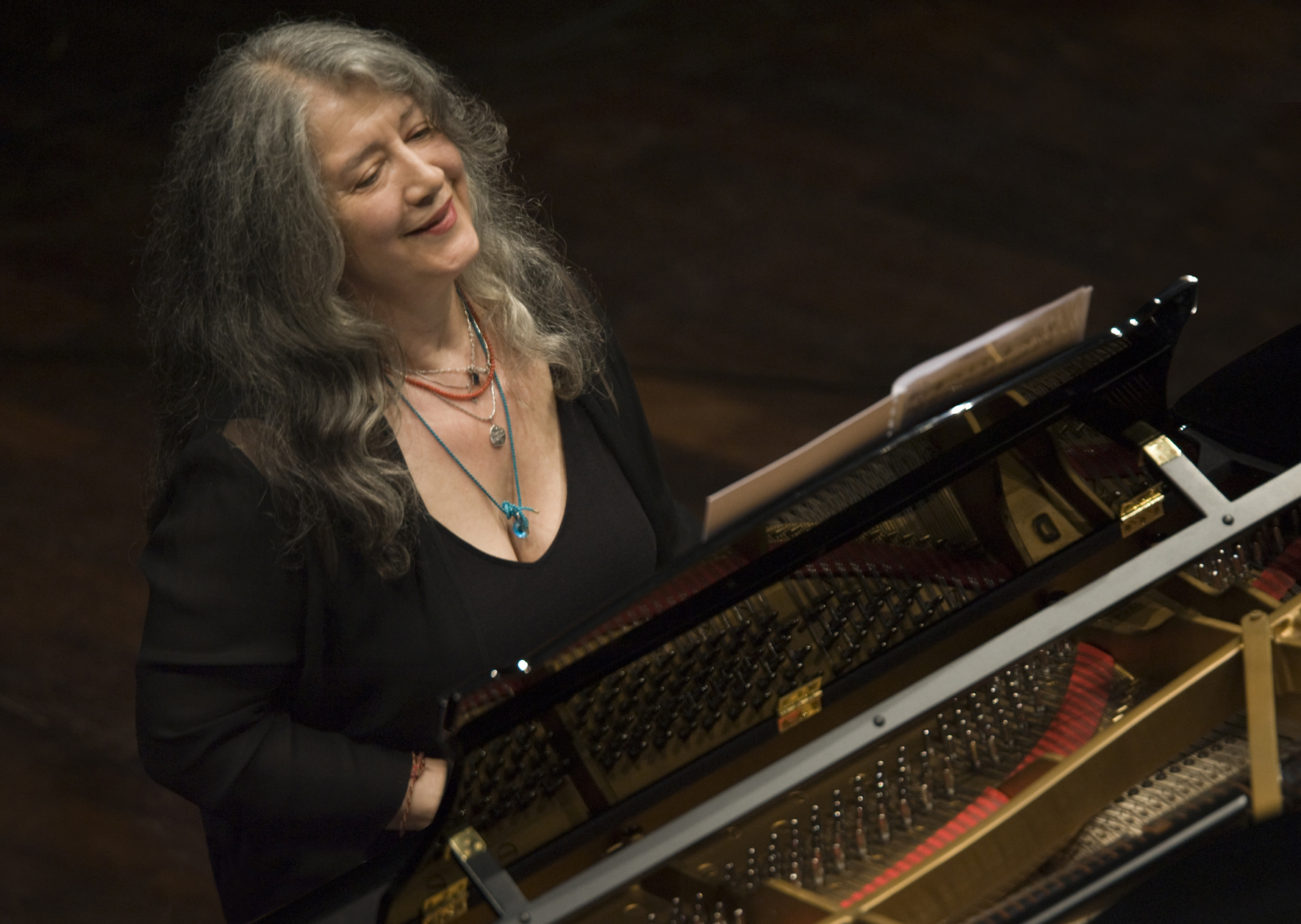
Martha Argerich, widely regarded as one of the greatest pianists of the second half of the 20th century

Notable Argentine musicians include composers Juan José Castro, who served as the director of the National Symphony in Buenos Aires from 1956 to 1960; Alberto Williams, one of the first Argentine composers to achieve international fame; Carlos Guastavino, whose compositions were heavily influenced by Argentina's folk music; Judith Akoschky; Daniel Barenboim, who has directed the Orchestre de Paris, the Chicago Symphony Orchestra and the Berlin State Opera; and Alberto Ginastera, considered Argentina's leading composer of the 20th century.

Other celebrated musicians include pianist Martha Argerich, violinist Alberto Lysy, classical guitarist María Isabel Siewers, tenor José Cura, and mezzo-soprano Margherita Zimmermann.

== Other artists ==
=== Soul/funk ===
- Power of Soul

=== Rap ===
- Fémina
- Illya Kuryaki and the Valderramas
- LUANDA

=== Reggae ===
- Los Cafres
- Todos Tus Muertos
- Dread Mar I
- Fidel Nadal

=== Other ===
- Les Luthiers

== Multimedia ==
1.

2. Medley. John Michel

Selections:

1. Fuga y misterio. Ástor Piazzolla, music. Dancers: Vincent Morelle and Marilyne Lefor. (New Tango)
2. Medley. John Michel, cello and Mats Lidstrom, piano. (Milonga)

== See also ==
- Tango
- Public domain music
