= When Men Discuss Women =

- Spanish: Cuando los hombres hablan de mujeres
- Directed by: Fernando Ayala
- Release date: 1967
- Running time: 90 minute
- Country: Argentina
- Language: Spanish

When Men Discuss Women (Spanish: Cuando los hombres hablan de mujeres) is a 1967 Argentine film directed by Fernando Ayala.
