= La dicha en movimiento =

Studio album by Los Twist
- Released: October 17, 1983
- Recorded: 1983
- Studio: Panda Studios, Buenos Aires
- Genre: Pop rock, rockabilly, ska
- Label: SG Discos
- Producer: Charly García

Los Twist chronology
La dicha en movimiento (1983)	Cachetazo al vicio (1984)

Professional ratings
Review scores
Source	Rating
Rate Your Music	4/5 stars

La dicha en movimiento is the first album by Argentine pop rock band Los Twist, released in 1983 by SG Discos.

In 2007, the Argentine edition of Rolling Stone ranked it 15 on its list of "The 100 Greatest Albums of National Rock".

== Track listing ==
1. Jugando hula-hula [Playing Hula-Hoop]
2. 25 estrellas de oro [Twenty Five Gold Stars]
3. S.O.S sos una rica banana [S.O.S You Are a Tasty Banana]
4. Salsa!
5. Lo siento [I'm Sorry]
6. En el bowling [At the Bowling]
7. Es la locura [It's the Madness]
8. Ritmo colocado [Placed Rhythm]
9. Pensé que se trataba de cieguitos [I Thought They Were Blind Men]
10. Cleopatra, la reina del twist [Cleopatra, Twist Queen]
11. Quién puso el bomp [Who Put the Bomp]
12. El primero te lo regalan, el segundo te lo venden [They Give You the First One for Free, They Sell You the Second One]
13. Jabones flotadores [Floating Soaps]
14. Mocasín [Moccasin]
