= Chamamé =

Argentine folk music genre

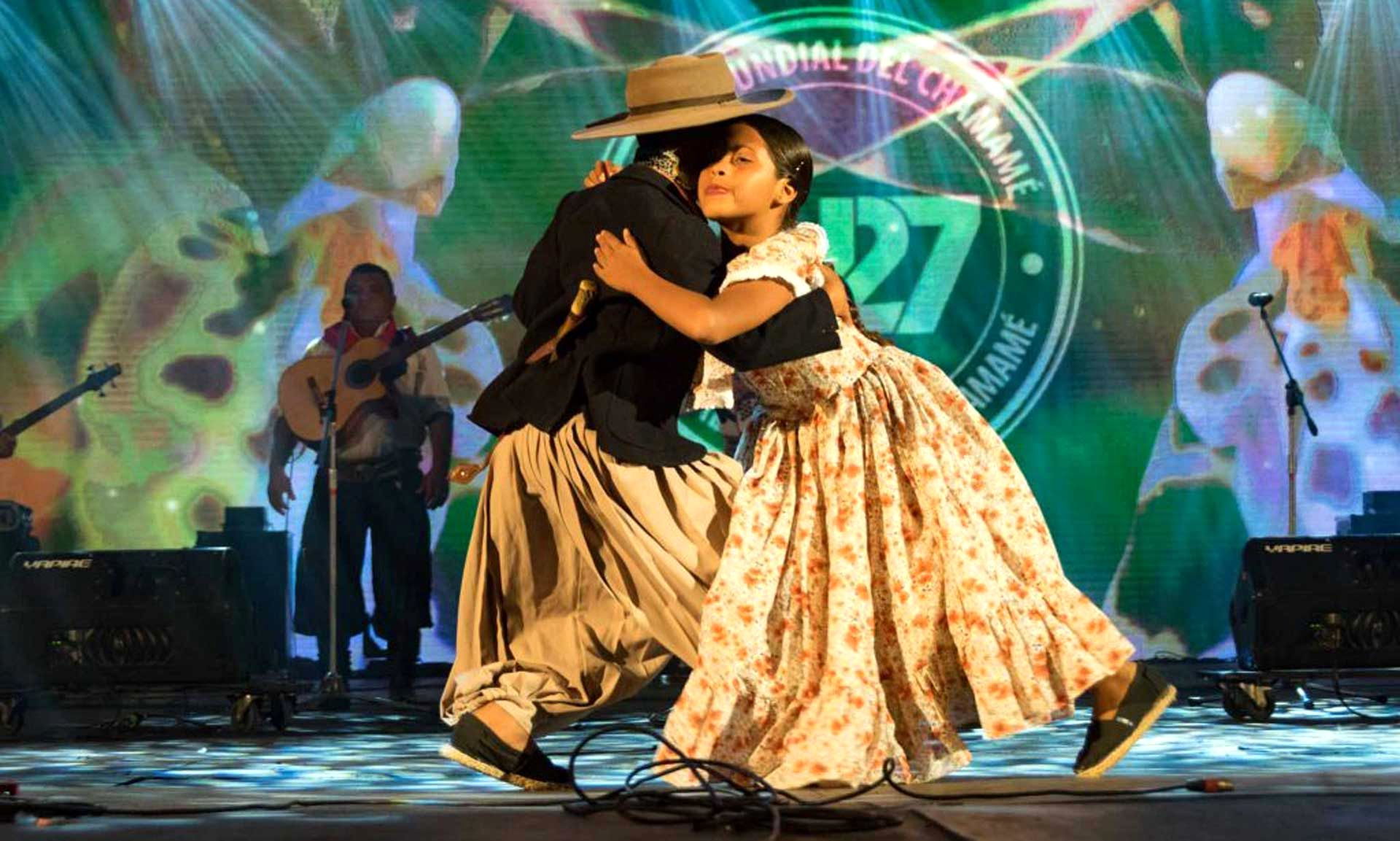
- A young couple dancing chamamé at the Fiesta Nacional del Chamamé Festival, in Corrientes, Argentina.
- Stylistic origins: Guaraní dances; Schottische; Paraguayan polka
- Cultural origins: Argentina (Corrientes). (Spanish, Guaraní and Volga German peoples).
- Typical instruments: Accordion; Bandoneon; Piano; Violin; Guitar; Double bass

Chamamé
- UNESCO Intangible Cultural Heritage
- Country: Argentina
- Reference: 01600
- Region: Latin America and the Caribbean

Inscription history
- Inscription: 2020 (15th session)
- List: Representative

Chamamé (Guarani for: party, disorder) is a folk music genre from northeast Argentina and Argentine Mesopotamia. In 2020, chamamé was inscribed in UNESCO's Intangible cultural heritage list after it was nominated by Argentina in 2018.

Chamamé is also a traditional musical style appreciated in borders zone of South America, as Paraguay and Uruguay

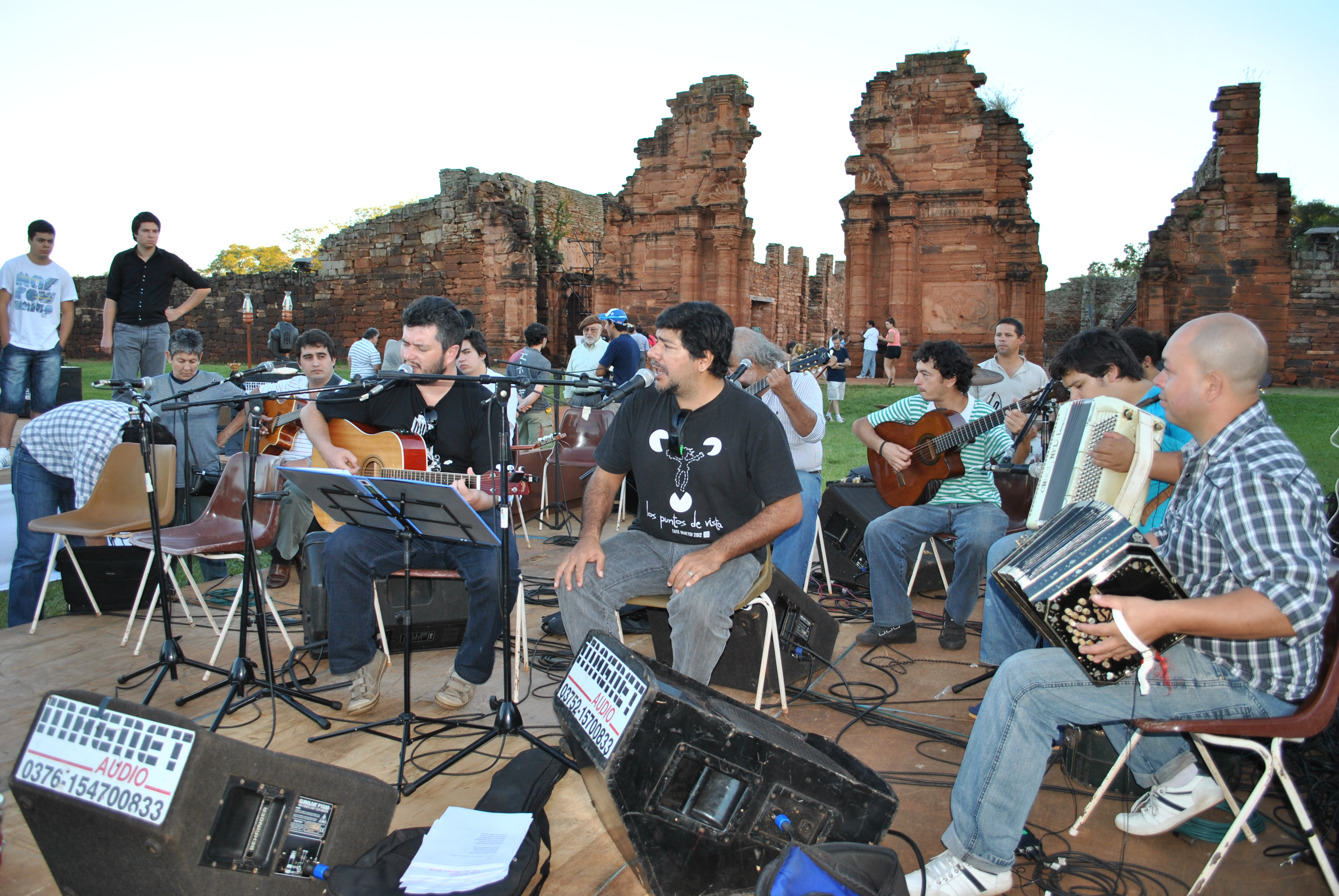
Joselo Schuap in San Ignacio, Misiones.

Jesuit reductions in the area encouraged cultural growth that lasted until the Jesuits were expelled by the Spanish Crown in the late 18th century. Within this area, Yapeyú, Corrientes was a centre of musical culture that many point to as the birthplace of the original chamamé. Further mixing with instruments such as the Spanish guitar, then the violin and the accordion, finally resulted in what is currently known as "chamamé". There are recordings of chamamé dating back to the early 20th century, and the term "chamamé" was already used in 1931; this type of music, prior to that, was often referred to as the Corrientes polka.

The chamamé, originally schottische brought by the Volga German immigrants, has considerable Guaraní influence, mixed with the Spanish guitar and the European accordion from those immigrants that arrived in the area at the beginning of the 20th century.

Among chamamé figures of note are Teresa Parodi, Tránsito Cocomarola, Alejandro Brittes, Ramona Galarza, and Chango Spasiuk.

Chamamé arrived on stages such as Library Of Congress in September 2023 with accordionist Alejandro Brittes.

== See also ==
- Music of Argentina
- Schottische
- Jenkka
