= The Song Tells Its Story =

The Tango Tells Its Story
- Spanish: El canto cuenta su historia
- Directed by: Fernando Ayala; Héctor Olivera
- Release date: 1976
- Running time: 115 minute
- Country: Argentina
- Language: Spanish

The Song Tells Its Story (Spanish: El canto cuenta su historia), sometimes The Tango Tells Its Story, is a 1976 Argentine musical film directed by Fernando Ayala and Héctor Olivera. The film tells the history of song in Argentina, with a particular history of tango.

The film was made during the period of the Argentine military dictatorship. The censorship of the regime forced Olivera and Ayala to cut scenes featuring the banned and exiled singer Mercedes Sosa.

The film should not be confused with The Tango Tells its Story, (Spanish: El tango cuenta su historia) released in 1914, a documentary history of the tango.

== Cast ==
=== Musical performers ===
Musicians performing in the film are:

- Cayetano Daglio
- Ángel Villoldo
- Francisco Canaro
- Carlos Gardel
- Rosita Quiroga
- Ignacio Corsini
- Ada Falcón
- Agustín Magaldi and Pedro Noda
- Marta de los Ríos
- Margarita Palacios
- Eduardo Falú
- Los Cantores de Quilla Huasi
- Jorge Cafrune
- Amelita Baltar
- Los Hermanos Abalos

Some of these performances are archive footage from other films of notable singers.
