= Jorge Cafrune =

Argentine singer (1937–1978)

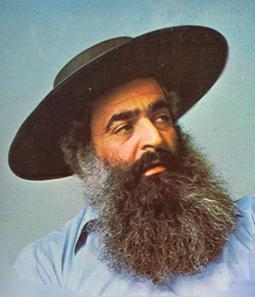

Background information
- Born: Jorge Antonio Cafrune; August 8, 1937
- Origin: Jujuy, Argentina
- Died: February 1, 1978 (aged 40)
- Genre: Argentine folk music
- Occupations: Singer, musician
- Instruments: Vocals, guitar
- Labels: Columbia, CBS

Jorge Antonio Cafrune (Perico Del Carmen, Jujuy, August 8, 1937 – Buenos Aires, February 1, 1978) was one of the most popular Argentine folklorist singers of his time, as well as an unflagging researcher, compiler, and diffuser of the native culture.

== Biography ==
Jorge Cafrune was born in the estancia "La Matilde" of El Sunchal, El Carmen, Jujuy in a family of Syrian–Lebanese origin. He completed his secondary studies in San Salvador de Jujuy, during which he took guitar classes with Nicolás Lamadrid.

In 1957 he recorded his first album with the band Las voces de Huayra that in 1960 changed its name to Los cantores del Alba, with Ariel Ramírez as manager. Beginning in 1962, Cafrune began to perform at the Cosquin Folkloric Festival. In 1966 in one of his visits to smaller villages, he met a young folklorist singer called José Larralde.

In 1967, Cafrune started a trip titled "De a caballo por mi patria" ("On horseback through my country") in homage to the Riojan leader Chacho Peñaloza. During this trip, Cafrune traveled about Argentina in the style of a traditional gaucho, taking his art and message around the country.

In 1977, after several years spent living in Spain, he returned to Argentina which was ruled at the time by the military dictatorship of Jorge Rafael Videla. The government saw a menace in Cafrune's outspoken music, particularly his politically controversial song Zamba de mi esperanza. On his persistence, Cafrune said, "Although it is not in the authorized repertoire, if my people request it of me, I am going to sing it." After being run over by a van driven by two 19-year-old men while riding a horse in a main road at 1 am, Cafrune died within twelve hours on February 1, 1978.

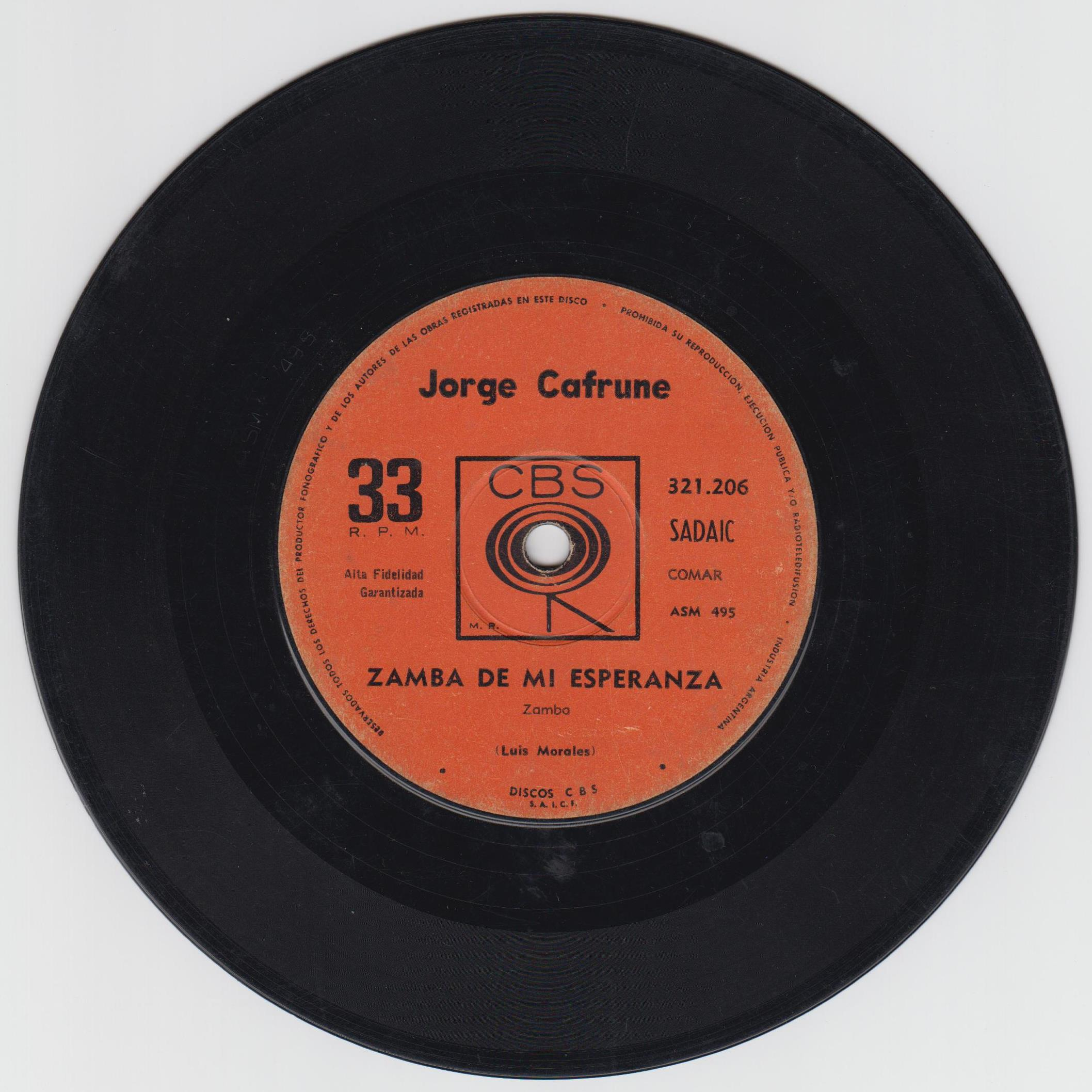
Zamba de mi esperanza, released by CBS Records International.

== Discography ==
| Title | Year | Company |
|---|---|---|
| Las voces de Huayra | 1957 | Columbia |
| Folklore | 1962 | H. y R. |
| Tope Puestero | 1962 | H. y R. |
| Cafrune | 1962 | H. y R. |
| Jorge Cafrune | 1962 | H. y R. |
| Emoción, Canto y Guitarra | 1964 | CBS |
| Cuando llegue el alba | 1964 | CBS |
| Que seas vos | 1964 | CBS |
| Ando cantándole al viento y no sólo por cantar | 1965 | CBS |
| El Chacho, Vida y muerte de un caudillo - Mono 8599 | 1965 | CBS |
| La Independencia | 1966 | CBS |
| Yo digo lo que siento | 1966 | CBS |
| Jorge Cafrune | 1967 | CBS |
| Yo he visto cantar al viento | 1968 | CBS |
| Este destino cantor | 1969 | CBS |
| Zamba por vos | 1969 | CBS |
| Jorge Cafrune interpreta a José Pedroni | 1970 | CBS |
| Lindo haberlo vivido para poderlo contar | 1971 | CBS |
| Labrador del canto | 1971 | CBS |
| Yo le canto al Paraguay | 1971 | CBS |
| Virgen India (con Marito) | 1972 | CBS |
| Aquí me pongo a contar… Cosas del Martín Fierro | 1972 | CBS |
| De mi madre (con Marito) | 1972 | CBS |
| De lejanas tierras. Jorge Cafrune le canta a Eduardo Falú y Atahualpa Yupanqui | 1972 | CBS |
| Siempre se vuelve | 1975 | CBS |
| Jorge Cafrune en la ONU | 1976 | CBS |

== Compilations ==
| Title | Year | Company |
|---|---|---|
| Jorge Cafrune 20 Grandes Canciones | | |
| Mis 30 mejores canciones (2 cd) | | Sony |

== Filmography ==
| Title | year | Directed by |
|---|---|---|
| Cosquín, amor y folklore | 1965 | Delfor María Beccaglia |
| Ya tiene comisario el pueblo | 1965 | Enrique Carreras |
| El cantor enamorado | 1969 | Juan Antonio Serna |
| Argentinísima | 1972 | Fernando Ayala y Héctor Olivera |
| El canto cuenta su historia | 1976 | Fernando Ayala y Héctor Olivera |
