= Los Twist =

Argentine rock group

- Origin: Argentina
- Years active: 1982 - 1988; 1991 - 2012
- Past members: Pipo Cipolatti; Fabiana Cantilo; Hilda Lizarazu; Daniel Melingo; Gonzalo Palacios; Eduardo Cano; Polo Corbella; Camilo Iezzi; Rolo Rossini

Los Twist was an Argentine pop rock group formed on March 30, 1982, in Buenos Aires.

Their music and aesthetics were inspired by the rockabilly and incorporated the twist rhythm from the 60s, plus a good dose of ska, while their lyrics contained social, personal and even political statements treated with humor and sarcasm. The band officially broke up on April 30, 2012.

Their first album, "La dicha en movimiento" from 1983 was produced by Charly García, and sold 120,000 copies.

Among their most famous songs are: Pensé que se trataba de cieguitos, Cleopatra, la reina del twist, 25 estrellas de oro, El rockabilly de los Narcisos, Cheek to Cheek, Twist de Luis, Ricardo Rubén, El estudiante, and Estoy herido, etc.

== Prominent members of Los Twist ==
- Pipo Cipolatti (guitar and lead vocals)
- Daniel Melingo (guitar, wind instruments, vocals)
- Fabiana Cantilo (vocals: first album)
- Eduardo Cano (bass: first 2 albums)
- Polo Corbella (drums: first album)
- Gonzalo "Gonzo" Palacios (saxophone)
- Rolo Rossini (drums)
- Hilda Lizarazu (vocals: third album)
- Camilo Iezzi (bass: third album)

== Discography ==
- "La dicha en movimiento" (1983)
- "Cachetazo al vicio" (1984)
- "La máquina del tiempo" (1985)
- "Cataratas musicales" (1991)
- "El cinco en la espalda" (1994)
- "Explosivo 96" (1995)
