= Héctor Olivera (film director) =

Argentine film director and producer (born 1931)

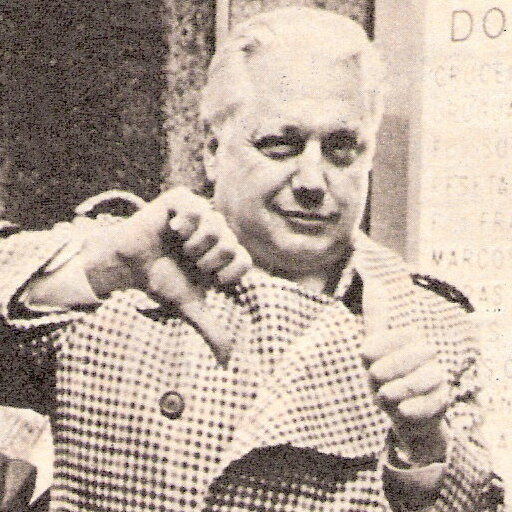
- Olivera in 1982
- Born: 5 April 1931 (age 95); Olivos, Buenos Aires, Argentina
- Occupations: Film director Film producer Screenwriter; Studio executive
- Years active: 1949–2012

Héctor Emilio Olivera (born 5 April 1931) is an Argentine film director, producer and screenwriter. Olivera worked mainly in the cinema of Argentina, but also has directed or contributed to several films made for the United States market.

== Biography ==
Olivera began his career when he was seventeen as a second assistant director and founded his own production company in 1956 at age twenty-five. He has produced over 100 features.

In the United States he is known for two of his films: Night of the Pencils (1986) and Funny Dirty Little War (1983).

After completing Funny Dirty Little War, he directed five films for Roger Corman: Cocaine Wars (1985), Barbarian Queen (1985), Wizards of the Lost Kingdom (1985), Two to Tango (1988), and Play Murder for Me (1990).

Olivera has occasionally received criticism for his choice of projects. While he has been recognized for delivering poignant political messages in some of his films he has also directed much more commercial fare. Argentine film historian Tamara Falicov addressed Olivera's track record in an article about American and Argentine co-productions in the 1980s and 1990s:

"Olivera stated in an interview that these more politically engaged films were in a sense "subsidized" by the more popular genres that he and Ayala produced. In order for Argentine film to survive, Olivera believes, it must conform to an industrial model as well as serving as a vehicle for cultural production. This model thus far has been successful, as Aries is one of the few remaining Argentine film studios still in production."

=== Festival juries ===
In 1988 he was selected as a member of the jury for the feature films official selection at the Cannes Film Festival. In 1998 he was selected as a member of the jury at the 48th Berlin International Film Festival that selected the "Golden Bear."

== Filmography as a director ==
- Primero yo (1964)
- Los neuróticos (1971)
- Argentinísima (1972)
- Argentinísima II (1973)
- Las Venganzas de Beto Sánchez (1973)
- La Patagonia rebelde (1974; adapted from Osvaldo Bayer's book; 1974 Silver Bear at the 24th Berlin International Film Festival)
- Cacique Bandeira (1975)
- El canto cuenta su historia (1976)
- La Nona (1979)
- Los viernes de la eternidad (1981)
- No habrá más penas ni olvido (1983), a.k.a. Funny Dirty Little War
- Buenos Aires Rock (1983)
- El mago del reino perdido (1985), a.k.a. Wizards of the Lost Kingdom
- Reina salvaje (1985), a.k.a. Barbarian Queen
- La muerte blanca (1985), a.k.a. Cocaine Wars
- La noche de los lápices (1986), a.k.a. Night of the Pencils
- Matar es morir un poco (1988), a.k.a. Two to Tango
- Negra medianoche (1990), a.k.a. Play Murder for Me
- El Caso María Soledad (1993)
- Una sombra ya pronto serás (1994)
- Antigua vida mía (2001)
- Ay Juancito (2004)
- El mural (2010)

== Awards ==
Wins

- Cairo International Film Festival: Best Director, for Ay Juancito, 2004.
- Argentinian Film Critics Association Awards: Career Condor, 2004.
- Cognac Festival du Film Policier: Grand Prix, for Funny Dirty Little War, 1985.
- Berlin International Film Festival: Confédération Internationale des Cinémas d'Art et Essai Juries (C.I.C.A.E.) Award; International Federation of Film Critics (FIPRESCI) Prize; Silver Berlin Bear, Special Jury Prize; for Funny Dirty Little War, 1984.
- Berlin International Film Festival: Silver Berlin Bear, for La Patagonia rebelde, 1974.

Nominations

- 15th Moscow International Film Festival: Golden Prize, for Night of the Pencils, 1986.
- Berlin International Film Festival: Golden Berlin Bear, for Funny Dirty Little War, 1985.
- Fantasporto: International Fantasy Film Award, for Los viernes de la eternidad, 1981.
- Berlin International Film Festival: Golden Berlin Bear, for La Patagonia rebelde, 1974.
