= Me First (film) =

- Directed by: Fernando Ayala
- Written by: Héctor Olivera; Luis Pico Estrada
- Produced by: Fernando Ayala; Héctor Olivera
- Starring: Alberto de Mendoza
- Cinematography: Ricardo Younis
- Edited by: Atilio Rinaldi
- Release date: 1964
- Running time: 90 minute
- Country: Argentina
- Language: Spanish

Me First (Spanish: Primero yo) is a 1964 Argentine drama film directed by Fernando Ayala, and written by Héctor Olivera and Luis Pico Estrada. It was entered into the 1964 Cannes Film Festival.

== Cast ==
- Alberto de Mendoza
- Ricardo Areco
- Eduardo Bergara Leumann (cameo)
- Cristina Berys
- Augusto Bonardo
- Horacio Casals
- Mirtha Dabner
- Susana Freyre
- Héctor Gance
- Mario Lozano
- Duilio Marzio
- Carlos Muñoz
- Esteban Nesich
- Marilina Ross
- Marcelo Simonetti
- Mercedes Sombra
- Juan Manuel Tenuta
- María Vaner
- Soledad Vertiz
