= Carlos Torres Vila (musician) =

Argentine folk singer

Carlos Torres Vila (9 November 1946 in Los Toldos, Buenos Aires – 16 July 2010 in San Miguel, Buenos Aires) was an Argentine folk singer.

He was a stand-out in the 1969 Baradero festival and the 1970 Cosquín Festival. He was one of the first soloists to introduce the so-called "romantic folk" (folclore romántico), a blend of traditional Argentine music and melodic songs. Through this approach, he broke several sales records in the 1970s. In 1977, he decided to fully dedicate himself to melodic music, as evidenced by his albums "Consagración", "Que Romántico", and "Me vas a echar de menos". In 1982, his LP "El retorno de Carlos Torres Vila" marks his return to his familiar style, a style he would never abandon. Although he had a hiatus from recording in the 1990s, he continued performing across the country. Starting in 2000, he returned to recording regularly, releasing six albums throughout the decade. He died at noon on July 16, 2010, at the Sarmiento Clinic in the city of San Miguel, Buenos Aires after a long illness. He couldn't present his last disc edited in 2009 and called El Autor.

== Discography ==
- Muchacha - 1970
- La canción del te quiero - 1971
- Personalidad - 1972
- Que pasa entre los dos- 1973
- Te quiero solo mía - 1974
- Carlos Torres Vila - 1975
- Muchas veces por ti lloro - 1976
- Consagración - 1977
- Que romántico - 1979
- Me vas a echar de menos - 1981
- El retorno de Carlos Torres Vila - 1982
- Como antes - 1983
- Soledad - 1984
- Torres Vila ´86 - 1986
- Recuerdos - 1987
- Se me hace agüita la boca - 1990
- Sentimientos - 1994
- Regreso - 2000
- Ámame tal como soy - 2001
- La Historia de Carlos Torres Vila - 2005
- Carlos Torres Vila - 2005
- Por siempre romántico - 2007
- El Autor - 2009
