= Fernando Ayala =

Argentine film director, screenwriter and film producer

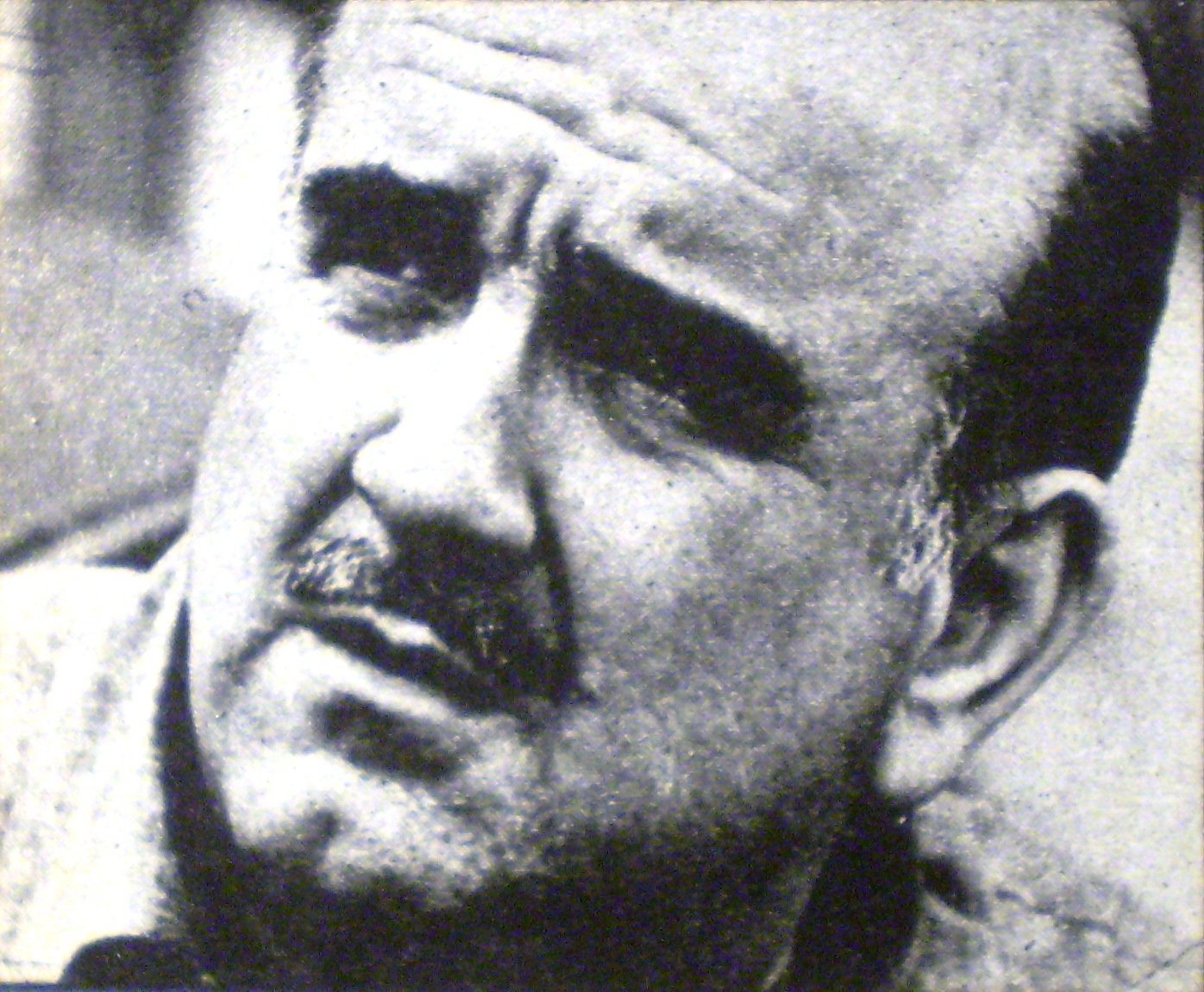
- Born: 2 July 1920; Gualeguay, Entre Ríos
- Died: 11 September 1997 (aged 77); Buenos Aires, Argentina
- Occupations: Film director, screenwriter
- Years active: 1955–1991

Fernando Ayala (2 July 1920 – 11 September 1997) was an Argentine film director, screenwriter and film producer of the classic era.

Ayala initially began as a trainee assistant director in 1942, in El Viaje, and within two years he had become an assistant director. By 1949 he had obtained his first job as director, and from 1958 he also served as producer for the films he directed and some others. Between 1950 and 1987 he was involved in the direction and production of well over 40 films, such as Ayer fue primavera in 1955 and Argentinísima and Argentinísima II in 1972 and 1973 respectively. In 1963 he was a member of the jury at the 13th Berlin International Film Festival. His 1983 film The Deal was entered into the 13th Moscow International Film Festival where it won a Special Diploma.

== Filmography ==
=== Director ===
- Ayer fue primavera (1955)
- Los tallos amargos (1956)
- Una viuda difícil (1957)
- El jefe (1958)
- The Candidate (1959)
- Sábado a la noche, cine (1960)
- Paula cautiva (1963)
- La industria del matrimonio (1964)
- Primero yo (1964)
- Viaje de una noche de verano (1965)
- Con gusto a rabia (1965)
- Hotel alojamiento (1966)
- Las locas del conventillo (1966)
- Cuando los hombres hablan de mujeres (1967)
- En mi casa mando yo (1968)
- El professor hippie (1969)
- La fiaca (1969)
- El profesor patagónico (1970)
- La guita (1970)
- La gran ruta (1971)
- Argentino hasta la muerte (1971)
- El profesor tirabombas (1972)
- Argentinísima (1972)
- Argentinísima II (1973)
- Triángulo de cuatro (1975)
- El canto cuenta su historia (1976)
- Los médicos (1978)
- Desde el abismo (1980)
- Días de ilusión (1980)
- Abierto día y noche (1981)
- Plata dulce (1982)
- El arreglo (1983)
- Pasajeros de una pesadilla (1984)
- Sobredosis (1986)
- El año del conejo (1987)
- Dios los cría (1991)
