= Santiago Ayala =

Argentine footballer (born 2002)

Personal information
- Full name: Santiago Agustín Ayala Rodríguez
- Date of birth: 6 May 2002 (age 24)
- Place of birth: Posadas, Misiones, Argentina
- Height: 1.73 m (5 ft 8 in)
- Position: Forward

Team information
- Current team: Provincial Osorno
- Number: 11

Youth career
- Guaraní Antonio Franco
- Garupá FC
- Independiente

Senior career*
| Years | Team | Apps | (Gls) |
| 2022–2024 | Independiente | 8 | (0) |
| 2023–2024 | → Tristan Suárez (loan) | 23 | (1) |
| 2025– | Provincial Osorno | 2 | (0) |

International career
| 2017 | Argentina U15 | | |
- * Club domestic league appearances and goals as of 5 May 2025

Santiago Agustín Ayala Rodríguez (born 6 May 2002) is an Argentine footballer who plays as a forward for Chilean club Provincial Osorno.

== Club career ==
As a youth player, Ayala was with Guaraní Antonio Franco and Garupá FC before joining the Independiente youth system. He made his professional debut under Claudio Graf in the match against Atlético Tucumán on 23 July 2022. In June 2023, he was loaned out to Tristán Suárez until the end of 2024.

After having no chances to play for Independiente in 2025, Ayala moved to Chile and signed with Provincial Osorno.

== International career ==
Ayala represented Argentina at under-15 level in 2017.
