= Tránsito Cocomarola =

Argentine musician and folklorist

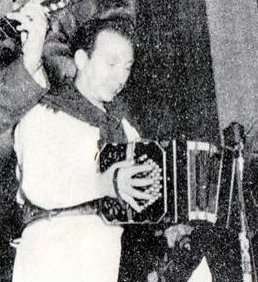
Tránsito Cocomarola

Mario del Tránsito Cocomarola (San Cosme, Corrientes, 15 August 1918 – 19 September 1974) was an Argentine musician and folklorist, and is known as one of the most influential figures of chamamé. His repertoire of about 400 compositions included some classics such as "Kilometro 11", "Puente Pexoa", and "Rincón dichoso" y "Retorno".

In the 1930s and 1940s he joined several musical ensembles, such as "Los hijos de Corrientes", el "Trío típico Correntino", "Los Kunumí", and the "Trío Taragüí". In 1942 he recorded his first album in the Odeon, which would later kick start a solo career that lasted until the year of his death. He played alongside many great figures of the genre.

After a complication during a gall bladder operation, he died on 19 September 1974, aged 56.

In Corrientes, the Provincial Act No. 3278 established that date as the "Chamamé Day." He was posthumously named "Illustrious Citizen of the City of Corrientes".

== Links ==
- Biografía Completa del cantautor
- Biografía, Fundacionmemoriadelchamame.com
- Discografía de Tránsito Cocomarola, discogs.com
