= Abel Pintos =

Argentine musician

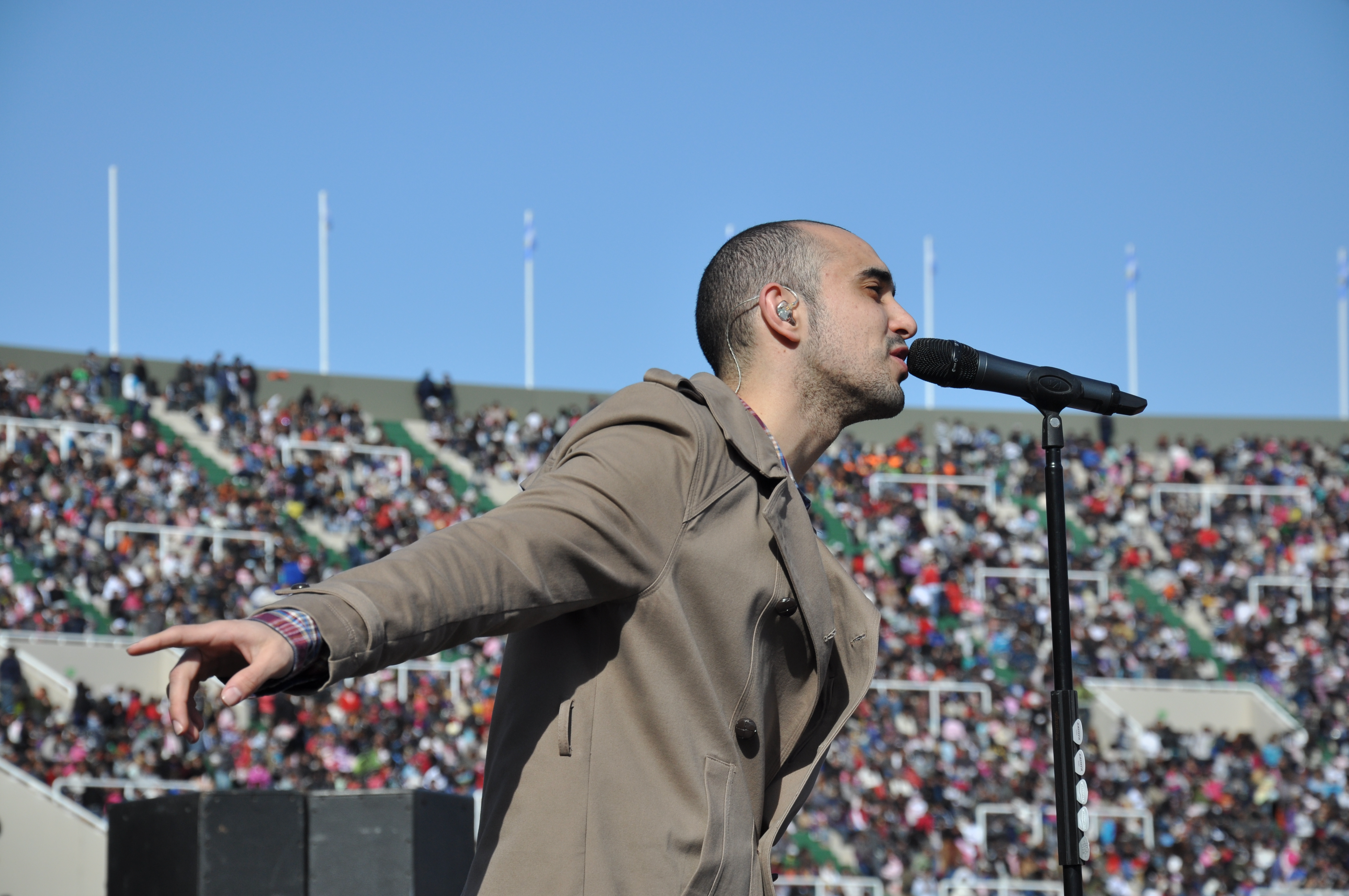
- Abel Pintos in concert, Córdoba, Argentina (2011).

Background information
- Born: Abel Federico Pintos; May 11, 1984 (age 42); Bahía Blanca, Argentina
- Genres: Folk; Pop
- Occupations: Musician, singer-songwriter
- Instruments: Vocals, guitar
- Years active: 1997–present
- Label: Sony Music
- Website: www.abelpintos.com

Abel Federico Pintos (born May 11, 1984) is an Argentine singer-songwriter. He started his solo career at the age of 13 with his album Para cantar he nacido (I Was Born To Sing), supported financially by León Gieco. After the release of four studio albums, he started writing his own songs that marked a departure from his folk style.

He rose to prominence with La llave (The Key), although the CD and DVD Sueño dorado (Golden Dream), which marked fifteen years in the music industry, was his best-selling record of 2012. Along with artists such as Soledad Pastorutti and Luciano Pereyra, Pintos has been dubbed as a promising rising star of Argentine folk music.

He was awarded the Gold Gardel prize for his CD and DVD Sueño Dorado.

== Biography ==
=== Early career and Para cantar he nacido (1984–1998) ===
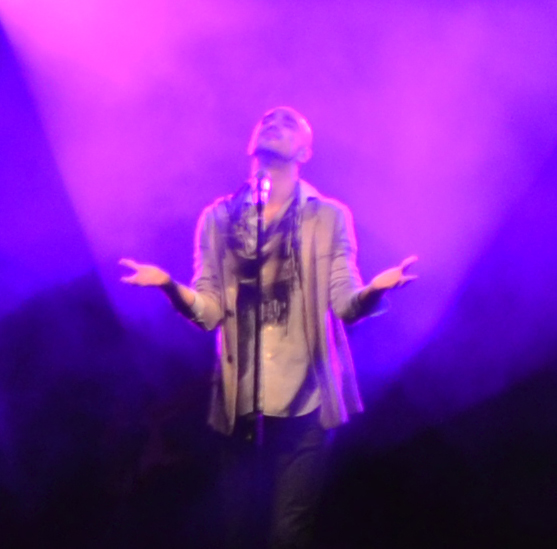
Abel Pintos on the Reevolución tour, in Melincué (Santa Fe)

Abel Federico Pintos was born in Buenos Aires Province on May 11, 1984, in the city of Bahía Blanca, but was brought up in Cutral Có, Neuquén Province. He made his first steps into music at the age of 7, when he was chosen to sing at a commemoration event for José de San Martín taking place at his school. In the audience was a representative from the municipal government who, impressed by his voice, invited Pintos to sing at another event commemorating the founding of Ingeniero White, his town in the south of Buenos Aires province. He performed three songs at this event: one by Víctor Heredia, another by León Gieco, and the third by Horacio Guarany. Following this performance he started to gain recognition, and launched his musical career thereafter. His early career was boosted by a string of lucky breaks: first, tango singer Raúl Lavié travelled to Bahía Blanca on a tour called Tango en la Bahía ("Tango by the bay"), where he heard Pintos sing. On that day, Pintos had a demo-tape of his recordings and gave it to Lavié who in turn handed it on to Pity Iñurrigarro, then producer for León Gieco. Iñurrigarro organised a record deal with Sony Music through his production company Abraxas.

Pintos then went to Buenos Aires, where he was personally introduced to León Gieco, who then supported him and produced his first release. Para cantar he nacido ("I Was Born To Sing") became the title of his first record which he made during the month of March in the ION studios, consisting of 18 covers of popular songs by artists such as Horacio Banegas, Carlos Carabajal, Peteco Carabajal, Raúl Carnota, Atahualpa Yupanqui, César Isella and Bebe Ponti. The album's leading single was the title track of Para canter he nacido, for which he received awards at Argentina's most prestigious folk music festivals. Pintos commented himself that his debut album was replete with expectations, anxiety and "excesses of adrenaline". While retrospectively he sees it as an album that was not recorded hastily, he has since acknowledged that his approach to recording an album has changed since Para cantar he nacido.

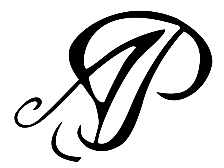
Abel Pintos' official logo

At the 38th Cosquín Festival, Pintos was granted the opportunity to perform three times on the festival's main stage. The first occasion was on January 28, where he sang three songs from his first album. The first of these was "Cuando llegue el alba" ("When Dawn Comes") (which he performed as a duet with León Gieco), the second was "El 180", and the final was the lead single of "Para cantar he nacido". His performance met with positive reception from the crowd, at which point he was invited by the festival's organisers to perform twice more, on January 31 and then February 1. It was on this day that he received the "special mention" from the folk music commission, and the Gold Award of the Cosquín Festival, presented to up-and-coming artists by the Argentine Society of Authors and Songwriters (SADAIC).

=== Rise to prominence, Todos los días un poco and Cosas del corazón (1998–2003) ===
On March 1, 1998, he performed at Buenos Aires Vivo II, a show organised by the Buenos Aires city government, where he shared the stage with León Gieco to perform "Cuando llegue el alba" and "Para cantar he nacido".

Following the success of his debut album, Pintos turned to creating a second album: Todos los días un poco (A Little Bit Everyday), in which he was to infuse classic songs by popular performers with his own compositional style, with the aim of showcasing his own unique flair and vocal characteristics. The album was released in March 1999, under the executive production of Pity Iñurrigarro, Luis Gurevich and Roly Hernández. Notable songs from this album included: Haracio Guarany's "Cuando nadie te nombre" (When Nobody Mentions You), Atahualpa Yupanqui's "La tucumanita" (The Girl From Tucuman), Cuti Carabajal's "La Sacha Pera", Eduardo Falú's "Tonada del viejo amor" (Melody Of Old Love), León Gieco's "Todos los días un poco" (A Little Bit Everyday) and a humorous take on a traditional Argentine folk dance by Horacio Fontova called "Que viva la chacarera" (Long Live The Chacarera). The leading single, "Ojos de cielo" (Eyes of the Heavens) by Víctor Heredia, was recorded with the Kennedy Chorus of Buenos Aires. Alongside him in concert and in the recording studio were his brother Ariel Pintos (lead guitar and post-production), his father Raúl Pintos (percussion), Diego Simonovich (backing guitar and post-production), Edgardo Peralta (rhythm guitar and charango) and Waldo Graff (keyboard).

In the summer of 2000, Abel Pintos performed in several prestigious festivals around Argentina, including the 2000 Cosquín Festival and the Jesús María Festival in the province of Córdoba. He released Cosas del corazón (Things of the Heart) on December 19, 2001, which was made possible by collaboration with musicians such as Domingo Cura and the Bandoneon player Carlos Buono. The record was produced by Martín Carrizo, and was recorded in Palermo, Buenos Aires. Although Cosas del corazón was released with a tight commercial strategy, it did not achieve the success that Pintos has hoped for. The main reason for this was that it was released two days before the economic crash and riots of December 2001. Abel Pintos deemed it to be one of his best records, being a "hinge between the vibes of previous albums". It was the first album which drew together influences from Central American music, and Argentine folk and rock music. From Cosas del corazón onwards, Pintos started to develop a unique, eclectic musical style which would consolidate in later albums.

=== Sentidos and Sueño Dorado (2003–2013) ===
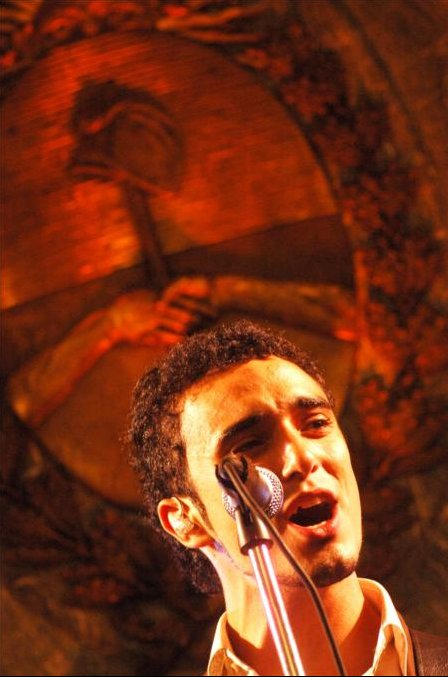
Abel Pintos singing at the Casa Rosada, 2007.

By the end of 2003, after a hiatus, Abel Pintos returned to the studio to record his own songs and exhibit his development as an artist in his own right. From April 2005, pianist Alfredo "Fredy" Hernández joined his touring and recording band line-up.

2004 saw Pintos release Sentidos (Meanings), something of a new start for Pintos, given that it was the first album he had recorded in three years. After a dip in record sales, Sentidos was the first album to be released with a major record label, Sony BMG. In February 2004 he performed in the Viña del Mar International Song Festival, competing in the Festival's folk section with the song "Bailando con tu sombra (Alelí)" (Dancing With Your Shadow), written by Víctor Heredia. The performance earned him the ceremony's "Gaviotas de Plata" (Silver Seagull) award, the top award of competition – one for the Winning Song and another for the Best Performer.

Pintos' 2005 album Reflejo real (Real Reflection) marked a move in his career towards a more sophisticated and personal compositional style. The album drew upon the creative development of his two previous albums Cosas del corazón and Sentidos.

On July 10, 2012, Pintos released Sueño Dorado (Golden Dream), a CD/DVD Greatest Hits compilation featuring songs from across the 15 years of his career. In less than one week, Sueño Dorado was awarded Gold status, and after seven months attained Double Platinum status. The first single from the album was "Cactus", a cover of a song of the same name by Gustavo Cerati, released on June 19. The DVD was recorded live in Quilmes, a village of ancient Native American ruins in Tucumán province between May 8–10, 2012. A few days beforehand, the Spanish band La oreja de Van Gogh recorded their own DVD Cometas por el Cielo – En directo desdo América, with Abel Pintos in the audience while having his final rehearsals. The line-up in Pintos' performance was a selection of songs taken from distinct moments throughout his career as a songwriter and performer, in which he combined acoustic, folk and electronic soundscapes. The concert took place at dawn, as the sun began to light up the landscape. The technical recording team was made up of over fifty people, and the production went ahead with the permission of the local indigenous communities.

=== Abel (2013–present) ===
The 2013 album Abel met with positive reception from critics and fans alike. The first single from the album, "Aquí te espero" (I'm Waiting For You Here), was released on October 9, 2013, and became Triple-Platinum in less than a month from its initial release. On the reason for giving the album his first name, Pintos commented:

"I've brought in music beyond any specific genres; I've brought in songs that touch upon my own feelings, yet at the same time, in every song, I've incorporated ideas, emotions and experiences that life has put in my way. It's for this reason that the title of this album is, and always will be, my own name: ABEL"

== Discography ==
- Para cantar he nacido (1998)
- Todos los días un poco (1999)
- Cosas del corazón (2001)
- Sentidos (2004)
- Reflejo real (2005)
- La llave (2007)
- Reevolución (2010)
- Sueño dorado (2012)
- Abel (2013)
- Único (2015)
- 11 (2017)
- La familia festeja fuerte – Live Version: 11 World Tour, Bs. As. (Argentina) (2018)

== Awards and recognition ==
=== Premios Gardel ===
Year	Category	Work	Result
2014	Gold Gardel Prize		Won
2014	Best Pop Album	Abel	Won
2014	Production of the Year	Abel	Won
2014	Album of the Year	Abel	Won
2014	Song of the Year	Aqui te espero	Won
2013	Gold Gardel Prize		Won
2013	Production of the Year	Sueño dorado	Nominated
2013	Album of the Year	Sueño dorado	Won
2013	Song of the Year	Sueño dorado	Won
2013	Best Album by a Male Pop Artist	Sueño dorado	Won
2013	Best DVD	Sueño dorado	Nominated
2011	Production of the Year	Reevolución	Nominated
2011	Album of the Year	Reevolución	Nominated
2011	Song of the Year	Reevolución	Nominated
2011	Best Album by a Male Folk Artist	Reevolución	Won
2011	Best Record Production	Reevolución	Nominated
2011	Best Cover Art	Reevolución	Nominated
2008	Best Alternative Folk Album	La llave	Won

=== Other awards ===
- Recognition Award Cosquín Festival, Argentina – 2008
- "Francisco Canaro" SADAIC Award (Argentine Society of Authors and Songwriters) for New Artists – 2007
- Best New Folk Album/Artist Award at Premios Gardel – 2006
- Best New Folk Album/Artist at Premios Gardel – 2005
- Performer of Best Song Award at XLV Viña del Mar International Song Festival, Chile – 2004
- Best Performer Award at XLV Viña del Mar International Song Festival, Chile – 2004
- Best Newcomer Award at Baradero Festival, Argentina – 2002
- Best Newcomer Award at Jesús María Festival, Argentina – 2001
- Special Mention by SADAIC at Cosquín Festival, Argentina – 1998
- Newcomer Award at Cosquín Festival, Argentina – 1998
- Patron of "Festival of Popular Music" in San Justo, Santa Fe, Argentina

(He was given a recognition award for being the patron of the Festival of Popular Music by the Football Sub-commission of Colón de San Justo FC.)

== See also ==
- Music of Argentina
- Chacarera
- Culture of Argentina
