= Pedro Pablo García Caffi =

Argentine singer (1947–2022)

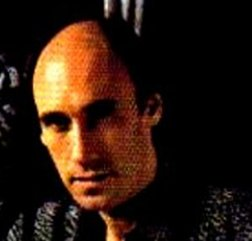
- Caffi in 1981
- Born: 1944; Buenos Aires, Argentina
- Died: 1 July 2022 (aged 77); Buenos Aires, Argentina
- Occupations: singer; stage director; producer; cultural administrator

Pedro Pablo García Caffi (1944 – 1 July 2022) was an Argentine singer, stage director, producer and cultural administrator. He focused mainly on Argentine popular music, as a member of the Cuarteto Zupay; and on classical music, as conductor of the Camerata Bariloche and as general director of the Orquesta Filarmónica de Buenos Aires. He was general and artistic director of the Teatro Argentino de La Plata and general and artistic director of the Teatro Colón de Buenos Aires.

== Life and career ==
Born in Buenos Aires, Caffi became first known as founding member and lead singer of the folk group Cuarteto Zupay.

A stage director since 1983, following the 1991 disbandment of the group in 1992 he was nominated general director of the Buenos Aires Philharmonic, a position he left in 1997 to become executive director of the prestigious Camerata Bariloche. He directed the Teatro Argentino de La Plata from 1999 to 2002. Between 2009 and 2015 he served as general and artistic director of Teatro Colón.

== Death ==
Caffi died on 1 July 2022, at the age of 77.
