= Sergio Denis =

Argentine singer (1949–2020)

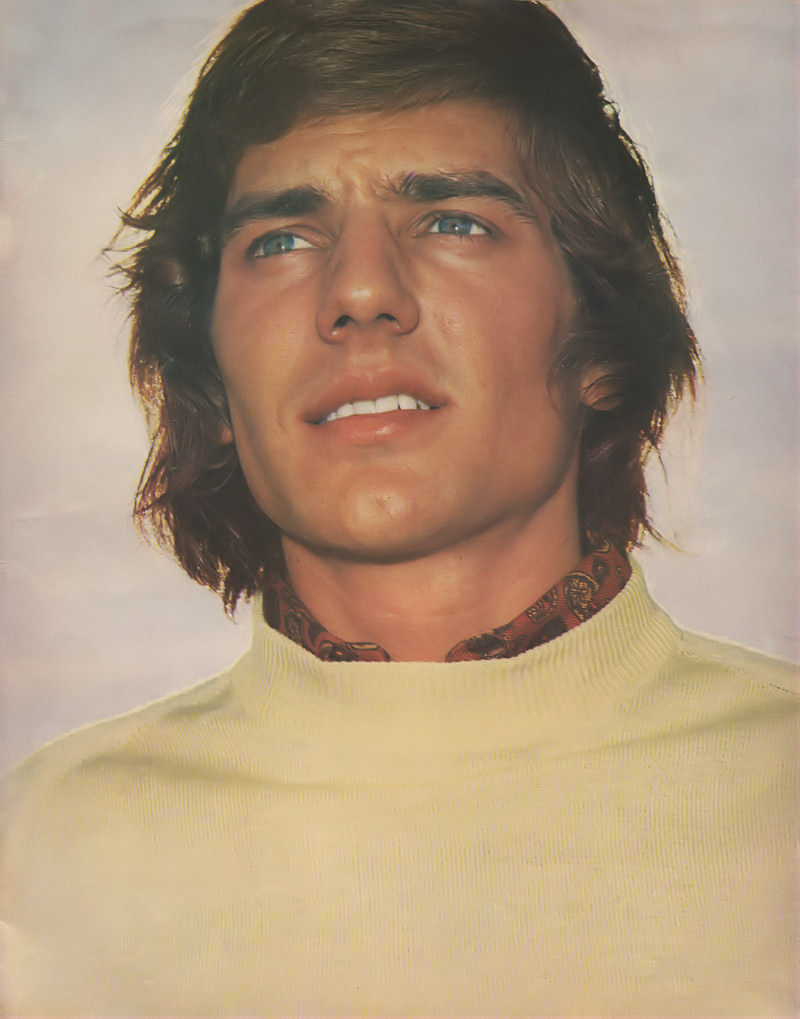
- Sergio Denis in 1971.

Background information
- Born: Héctor Omar Hoffmann Fenzel; 16 March 1949; Coronel Suárez, Argentina
- Died: 15 May 2020 (aged 71) Buenos Aires, Argentina
- Genre: Pop
- Occupations: Singer, songwriter, composer, actor, author
- Instruments: Vocals, guitar
- Years active: 1969–2019
- Labels: Columbia Broadcasting System (1969–1975), TK (1976) PolyGram (1977–1990) EMI Odeón (1991–1995) and BMG.
- Website: http://www.sergiodenis.com.ar/

Héctor Omar Hoffmann Fenzel, better known as Sergio Denis (16 March 1949 – 15 May 2020) was an Argentine singer-songwriter and occasional actor.

== Biography ==
Héctor Omar Hoffmann Fenzel was born in a family of descendants from Volga Germans; his father being Feliciano Hoffmann and his mother María Esther Fenzel. The only exception to this Volga German background was his maternal grandmother, of Spanish descent. During his childhood, he used to sing in school festivals and family meetings. When he was 16 years old, he was a member of a band named "Los Jokers", with which he toured for 4 years the neighbouring cities to his town.

In March 1969 he moved to Buenos Aires and entered the group "Los Bambis", and together recorded for the first time for Columbia Broadcasting System (CBS). The vinyl recording was named Los Bambis también cantan. CBS producers soon saw Hoffmann's potential as a solo singer; in November 1969 he recorded the songs Fui un soñador (I was a dreamer) and Te llamo para despedirme (I call you to say goodbye), produced and written by Francis Smith.

This single began to have radio airplay in December, and on 1 January 1970 Denis first performed on TV, in the programme "Casino Philips", hosted by Andrés Percivale and broadcast by Canal 13 de Buenos Aires. During that same month, Canal 13 hired him for another programme, Sábados Circulares hosted by Pipo Mancera. In March, Denis travelled to México D.F. to participate in the contest "Primer Festival de la Canción Latina" (First Festival of the Latin Song), event in which he reached the 5th place with the song Yo te amo como entonces (I love you like before); curiously this song was never released. Once he returned to Argentina, he was enlisted to do the Servicio Militar Obligatorio, and assigned to the Batallón de Comunicaciones 181 in Bahía Blanca. So, he alternated his military duties with his public performances and TV performances.

In 1972, due to the success of a song written by him, he co-starred in the film Me enamoré sin darme cuenta (I Fell in Love Without Noticing it) with Alicia Bruzzo and Luis Brandoni, directed by Fernando Siro. On 31 July 1974 he sang in the Teatro Opera, being the first pop/ballad singer to perform in that prestigious theatre. His performance was backed up by a 36 musicians-orchestra directed by Jorge Calandrelli.

In 1975 Denis broke free from CBS Columbia, and in mid-1976 he recorded a solo album for a small recording company named TK. The following year he was signed by PolyGram (now Universal); with this company Denis recorded most of his greatest hits until July 1990. In 1991 he signed a contract with EMI Odeón, where he recorded four more albums until 1995.

Denis recorded duets with well-known artists such as Julia Zenko and the Cuarteto Zupay, among others. He was guest vocalist in an album by the folklore group Los Cantores de Quilla-Huasi; they performed with Eduardo Falú the song Río de Tigre in that CD. He also recorded cover versions of two songs from the Misa Criolla by Ariel Ramírez for a Christmas album.

Some of his most popular ballads and romantic songs are: Yo nunca supe más de ti (I never knew anything else about you) from the homonymous album in 1973, Cada vez que sale el sol (Every time the sun rises) from the album of the same name (1977), Cómo estás, querida (How are you, darling) from the album Afectos (1985), Te quiero tanto (I love you so much) included in the album Imágenes (1986), and Un poco loco (A little crazy) from the homonymous album in 1991. He also recorded cover versions in Spanish of songs originally recorded in English, such as: California somnolienta (California dreamin', by The Mamas and the Papas) from the album Al Estilo de... Sergio Denis II (1981), Pipas de la paz (Pipes of peace, by Paul McCartney) included in the album La Humanidad (1984), Nada va a cambiar mi amor por ti (Nothing's Gonna Change My Love for You, by Glenn Medeiros) and Así fue nuestro amor (Annie's Song, by John Denver), both included in his album Afectos. He won many awards, being the best-selling Argentine singer-songwriter between 1985 and 1994.

== Personal life ==
During most of his career, Denis had love affairs with famous women, such as actress/TV hostess Susana Giménez and actress/producer Cris Morena. He was married once, and was divorced. He had one son Federico and two daughters, Bárbara and Victoria. His nephew Iván helped him design his official website.

In 2007, Sergio Denis was dating a girl named Melisa Durán, when she was selected to participate in the TV programme Gran Hermano 2007 broadcast by Telefe. Just a week after entering the house, Durán cheated on Denis with another contestant of the reality show. Her infidelity caused both the breaking up of the couple and her expulsion from the house, with more than 80% of votes against her.

On 14 May 2007, while on tour in Asunción, Paraguay, he suffered a decompensation that caused a cardiopulmonary arrest. Denis was admitted to the Sanatorio San Roque of that city unconscious and without vital signs, but he was resuscitated. The following day, the doctors disconnected him from the artificial respirator, and after a period of observation, he returned to his normal life.

On 11 March 2019, he suffered a 3-meter (10-foot) fall from the stage during a concert in San Miguel de Tucumán. Unconscious and with a broken shoulder, he was transported to a hospital, where he was put into an induced coma. He died without having woken up on 15 May 2020, a year and two months after his fall.

== Discography ==
- 1969 – "Los Bambis También Cantan" (The Bambies Also Sing)
- 1970 – "Te Llamo Para Despedirme" (I'm Calling To Say Farewell)
- 1971 – "Sergio Denis"
- 1972 – "Sergio Denis"
- 1973 – "Nunca Supe Más De Ti" (I Never Knew Anything More About You)
- 1974 – "Sergio Denis"
- 1975 – "La Historia De Un Idolo – Volumen 1: 1969 – 1972" (The History of an Idol – Volume 1: 1969 – 1972)
- 1975 – "La Historia De Un Idolo – Volumen 2: 1972 – 1974" (The History of an Idol – Volume 2: 1972 – 1974)
- 1975 – "Los Mas Grandes Exitos De Sergio Denis" (The Greatest Hits Of Sergio Denis)
- 1975 – "Los Mas Grandes Exitos De Sergio Denis – Vol. II" (The Greatest Hits Of Sergio Denis – Vol. II)
- 1976 – "Sergio Denis"
- 1977 – "Cada Vez Que Sale El Sol" (Whenever The Sun Rises)
- 1978 – "Por Ti" (For You)
- 1979 – "Una Mañana Volveré" (One Morning I Shall return)
- 1980 – "Al Estilo De... Sergio Denis" (I) (In The Style Of... Sergio Denis)
- 1980 – "Sergio Denis"
- 1981 – "Ineditos" (Raw)
- 1981 – "Al Estilo De... Sergio Denis" (II) (In The Style Of... Sergio Denis)
- 1981 – "16 Grandes Exitos" (16 Greatest Hits)
- 1981 – "Selección Especial (Edicion Limitada)" (Special Selection (Limited Edition Fan Club Only LP))
- 1982 – "Por La Simpleza De Mi Gente" (For The Simplicity of My People)
- 1983 – "Reflexiones" (Reflections)
- 1984 – "La Humanidad" (Humanity)
- 1985 – "Afectos" (Affections)
- 1986 – "Imágenes" (Images)
- 1986 – "Grandes Exitos" (Greatest Hits)
- 1987 – "20 Grandes Exitos" (20 Greatest Hits)
- 1987 – "14 Exitos Estelar" (14 Star Hits)
- 1987 – "Dulcemente" (Sweetly)
- 1988 – "Cerca Del Cielo" (Close To Heaven)
- 1988 – "Memorias" (Grabado en vivo) (Memories) (Live Recording)
- 1990 – "Sólo El Amor" (Only Love)
- 1990 – "Sus Mejores Momentos" (His Best Moments)
- 1990 – "Recuerdos" (Reminiscing)
- 1991 – "Un Poco Loco" (A Little Crazy)
- 1991 – "20 Grandes Exitos: Vol. 2" (20 Greatest hits: Vol. 2)
- 1992 – "Cuando Llega El Amor" (When Love Arrives)
- 1993 – "20 Grandes Exitos" (20 Greatest Hits)
- 1994 – "Natural"
- 1995 – "25 Años De Exitos" (2 CD) (25 Years Of Hits)
- 1995 – "Horizonte" (Horizon)
- 1996 – "Cuando Un Hombre Ama A Una Mujer" (When A Man Loves A Woman)
- 1999 – "La Vida Vale La Pena" (Life Is Worthy)
- 1999 – "Coleccion Aniversario" (Anniversary Collection)
- 2000 – "Esperanza" (Hope)
- 2000 – "Himno De Mi Corazon" (Anthem Of My Heart)
- 2003 – "Te Llevo En La Sangre" (I Carry You In My Blood)
- 2003 – "Los Esenciales" (The Essential)
- 2003 – "Palabras De Amor" (Words Of Love)
- 2005 – "Solo Lo Mejor" (Only The Best)
- 2006 – "Serie De Oro – Romanticos" (Gold Series – Romantic)
- 2006 – "Lo Mejor De Los Mejores: Colección Centenario EMI" (The Best Of The Best: EMI Centenary Collection)
- 2007 – "Mis 30 Mejores Canciones" (My 30 Best Songs)
- 2007 – "Universal Music Colour Collection"
- 2008 – "Coleccion Clarin: Grandes Idolos De La Musica Popular Argentina – No. 20" (CD + Libro) (Clarin Collection: Great Idols Of Argentine Pop Music – No. 20) (CD + Book)
- 2009 – "Ciclos" (CD + DVD) (Phases)
- 2009 – "Los Elegidos" (The Best)
- 2009 – "Oro – Grandes Exitos" (Gold – The Greatest Hits)
- 2009 – "20 Grandes Exitos" (20 Greatest Hits)
- 2010 – "Tu Amigo Fiel" (Your True Friend)
- 2012 – "Unico... (En Vivo)" (The One)

== Miscellaneous ==
- His song Te quiero tanto (I love you so much) is frequently sung during football matches around the world by the fans, with altered lyrics.
- During Football World Cup Mexico 1986, the Argentine coach Carlos Bilardo did not allow any player of the team get off the bus until Denis' song Gigante chiquito had stopped playing in the cassette recorder.
