= Ljerko Spiller =

Croatian-Argentine violinist

- Ljerko Spiller in his twenties
- Born: 22 July 1908; Crikvenica, Austro-Hungarian Monarchy, (now Croatia)
- Died: 9 November 2008 (aged 100); Buenos Aires, Argentina

Ljerko Spiller (22 July 1908 – 9 November 2008) was a Croat and Argentine violinist.

== Early life and education ==
Spiller was born in Crikvenica to a Croatian Jewish family. After World War I Spiller moved with his family to Zagreb, where he studied violin at the Music School of Croatian Music Institute under Vaclav Huml.

== Later life, education and career ==
Spiller at older age

As a scholar of the French government, Spiller perfected his knowledge of education at the École Normale de Musique de Paris, starting in 1928 when he began to study under Gaston Poulet, and continued his study under famous Jacques Thibaud. On Thibaud's recommendation Spiller played in freshly based chamber orchestra by Alfred Cortot, along with Zino Francescatti and Maurice Vieux. When Francescatti Spiller replaced him place as a concertmaster. Spiller graduated in 1930 and soon after his graduation he got a job as a lecturer at the Paris École Normale de Musique. He achieved great success in 1935 at Warsaw Henryk Wieniawski Violin Competition, one of the top competitions in the world in general.

On the eve of the World War II, Spiller left Europe to escape, as a Jew, the Nazi persecution. He moved to Buenos Aires where he began his life of a violinist, teacher, conductor and organizer of musical life. Spiller became active in a lengthy list classical groups, organizations and related professions, including: symphony orchestra concertmaster for LRA Radio del Mundo and the Amigos de la Musica; conductor, founder and artistic director of the Conjunto de Cámara; associate professor emeritus at the University of La Plata; and conductor and violinist of festival in Córdoba. He also taught in the discipline in San Carlos de Bariloche, and among his students was the virtuoso and Camerata Bariloche conductor, Alberto Lysy.

Spiller was frequent guest at master classes in Germany, Austria, Switzerland and Croatia. He was, for several consecutive years, a lecturer at Altensteig castle near Stuttgart. Spiller achieved many recognitions: the Sirlin Award in 1971 as the best Argentine professor of instruments in the past ten years; OEA and CIDEM honorary diplomas in Washington; two Konex Awards as a teacher for classical music; appointment as a Consejo de Música adviser to the governments of Germany, France, Switzerland and Austria; honorary member of the Association of Musical Artists in 1985 and of the Henryk Wieniawski Violin CompetitionAssociation in Warsaw. On the occasion of the Vaclav Huml sixth international violin competition, Ljerko Spiller received the Order of Danica Hrvatska in February 1997, which was awarded to him by Croatian President Franjo Tuđman.

Spiller frequently performed works of Ivan Mane Jarnović, Franjo Dugan, Milko Kelemen, Krsto Odak, Josip Štolcer-Slavenski, Miroslav Šlik and Miroslav Spiller. Long is a list of Spiller appearances with famous conductors, as well as various soloists with his conducting. Spiller is the author of one of the best violin textbook by which generations of young people study.

== Death ==
Spiller died on 9 November 2008 in Buenos Aires. He was 100 years old.
