= Mónica Cosachov =

Monica Cosachov (born 7 September 1946) is an Argentine harpsichordist, pianist and composer. She also serves as a visiting professor at universities and research centers internationally.

== Background ==
Cosachov was born in Buenos Aires and studied composition, piano and harpsichord at the Conservatorio Nacional de Buenos Aires. She later studied at the Yehudi Menuhin International Academy and the Academy Chigiana in Italy. During her studies, she developed an intense interest in chamber music.

== Music career ==
Cosachov is associated with the Camping Musical Bariloche music festival, is a founding member and soloist of the Camerata Bariloche, and became Director of the Department of Research and Teaching through her work with the Fundación Bariloche (Bariloche Foundation). Her interdisciplinary and transdisciplinary work on new perspectives in the formation of musicians and scientists led to her participation as a visiting professor at universities and research centers abroad.

She is currently Director of the Escuela Interdisciplinaria de Música (the Interdisciplinary School of Music), training center and artistic and social projects, work for which she won the Alicia Moreau de Justo prize for creative work and for supporting young artists. Argentina is a member of the Council of the Unesco, and through the United Nations, Cosachov has taught seminars in Argentina and at foreign universities including Colombia, Prague, Bavaria, Switzerland and several Latin American countries. In 2005 she was named director of the Fondo Nacional de las Artes (National Endowment for the Arts).

As a harpsichordist and pianist, Cosachov has performed in concert with Alberto Lysy, Walter Trampler, Jean-Pierre Rampal, Einar Holm, Thomas Tichauer, Andres Spiller, M. Andrée, Bruno Giurana, Peter Thomas and others. Among her outstanding students are Mario Raskin and Oscar Milani.

Cosachov has an interest in the work of Johann Sebastian Bach, has conducted seminars on the Goldberg Variations, keyboard work and chamber music and has received good reviews from critics for her full version of Well-Tempered Clavier.

== Works ==
Cosachov has composed works including La Rama Dorada, Concierto de Cámaras, La Magia de la Navidad that were released in theaters including the Zurich Opera, The Kennedy Center, Carnegie Hall, Teatro Reina Sofia and Teatro Colon of the City of Buenos Aires. Her works Los Siete Escalones Místicos and Los Tres Estados del Dragón premiered at the Festival of Sacred Music in Ljubljana, Poland and Trieste, Italy. In 2002 she released the CD Bach De Buenos Aires and recently, her latest production, Mi Corazón es mi casa.

Cosachov is the author of a book, Musicos, los mensajeros del sonido, released in 1988.
