= César Isella =

Argentine composer (1938–2021)

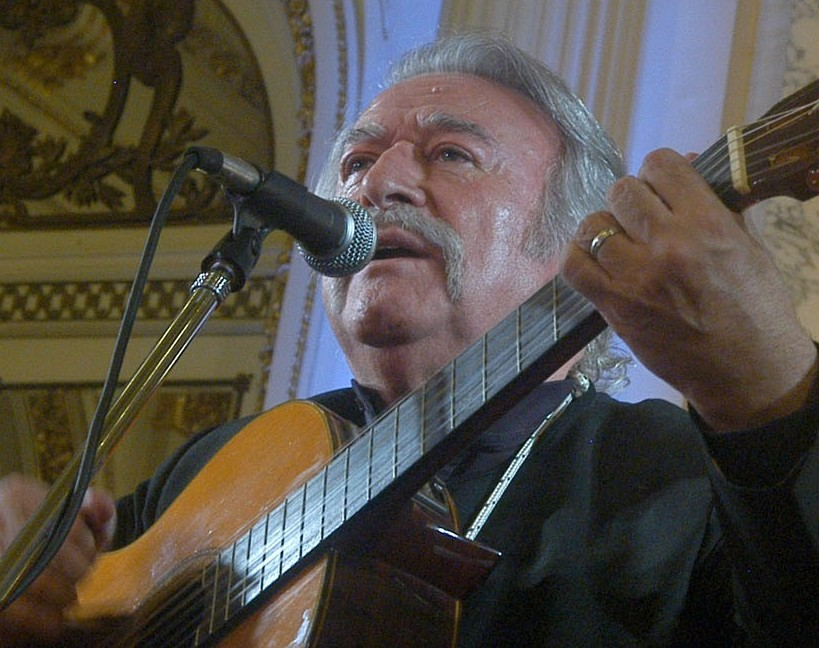
- César Isella sings in the Salón Blanco of the Casa Rosada, 2008

Background information
- Born: César Isella; 20 October 1938
- Origin: Salta, Argentina
- Died: 28 January 2021 (aged 82)
- Genres: Argentine and Latin American folk music
- Occupations: Singer, songwriter, journalist
- Instrument: Guitar
- Years active: 1954–2021

César Isella (20 October 1938 – 28 January 2021) was an Argentine singer and songwriter of folk music. He joined Los Fronterizos (The Bordermen) from 1956 to 1966, was one of the main figures of the "Movement of the New Songbook", and in the 1990s he discovered and sponsored the singer Soledad Pastorutti. He has written the music for "Canción con todos" (Song with everyone), regarded as the Latin American anthem.

== Biography ==
Isella was born in Salta. At age 7, he was hired to join the cast of Hollywood Park, on a tour of ten days through Salta province. Two years later he scored high on a weekly singing competition, winning over seven consecutive weeks and reaching the coveted first prize: a football.

In 1954, at age 17, Isella joined the group Los Sin Nombre (The Nameless), next to Thomas "Tutu" Campos, Javier E. Pantaleon, Luis Gualter Menu, and Higa. The first two end up forming Los Cantores del Alba (The dawn singers) and the third, Los de Salta. The Nameless came to act with Ariel Ramírez, in a presentation at the Salta Hotel.

=== Los Fronterizos ===
It was in 1956 that he joined the group Los Fronterizos (The Bordermen), replacing Carlos Barbarán, using his legal name Julio César Isella, completing the formation founded in 1953 by Gerardo López, along with Eduardo Madeo and Juan Carlos Moreno. His joining the group was critical for defining the style of Los Fronterizos making them one of the leading ensembles in the history of Argentine folklore. Lopez and Isella made the two baritone voices, first and second respectively, while Madeo and Moreno were a sharp and low. This setup was what led the group to stardom achieving major popularity.

Los Fronterizos recorded five songs by Isella when he was still part of the group: "La fiera" (Hechizo), "Se lo llevó el carnaval"" (Voces mágicas), "Guitarreando" (Voces mágicas), "Corazón guitarrero" and "Un abrazo a Corrientes" (Color en folklore). After that, without Isella, recorded others for: "Los seguidores" (Sangre fronteriza), "Canción de lejos" (Desde el corazón...), "Viento no más" (Cantando), "Paloma y laurel" (Hoy!!). With Los Fronterizos, in 1964, participated in the historic original recording of "Misa Criolla", by Ariel Ramírez, considered the supreme work of Argentine music.

=== The solo career ===
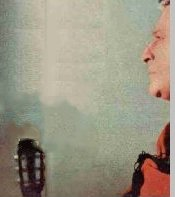
Cover photo of Cesar's first solo album by Isella, Estoy de vuelta (I'm back) (1968).

In 1966, began a solo career under the name César Isella. The decision surprised the audience, because after the Misa Criolla, Los Fronterizos were at the pinnacle of success.

César Isella's account then follows:

In 1963, with Los Fronterizos, we went to Mendoza and met on the same day with Atahualpa Yupanqui and Armando Tejada Gómez, Oscar Matus, the painter Carlos Alonso, Tito Francia, and a skinny Tucumán lady, Matus's wife, Mercedes Sosa. I was very surprised that they sang a repertoire very different to what I knew, both melodically and poetically. Add contents to a music that until then was only descriptive. Their sound again amazed me, and I grabbed a crush on them.

— Cesar Isella.

Isella then adhere fervently to the tenets of Movement of the New Songbook, which had launched Tejada Gómez, Mercedes Sosa, Mendoza Matus and other artists in 1963. In this new artistic line in 1968, released his first solo album called Estoy de vuelta (I'm back) which includes topics such as the beautiful "Zamba para no morir" (Zamba not to die) by Hamlet Lima Quintana, and also a tango, the famous "Milonga triste" from Homero Manzi and Sebastián Piana.

In 1969 composed the music for "Canción con todos" (Song with all), to which the poet Armando Tejada Gómez I added lyrics, a topic that has been designated by the UNESCO as Anthem from Latin America and translated into thirty languages. In 1970 submitted along with Tejada Gómez and Los Trovadores (The Bards), the show "Young America". In 1974 won the Martín Fierro Award for his radio program "Argentina canta así" (Argentina sings), broadcast by Radio Continental of Buenos Aires.

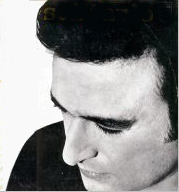
Cover photo of Cesar's second solo album by Isella, Solitaire (1969).

During the military dictatorship-called National Reorganization Process (1976–1983), Isella was included in the lists of censorship as ("Canción con todos") "Song with all". Among the plays performed in those years highlights the album Juanito Laguna (1976), the child character of the painter Antonio Berni, with music and poetry of Ástor Piazzolla, Horacio Ferrer, Atahualpa Yupanqui, Gustavo Leguizamón, Manuel J. Castilla, Armando Tejada Gómez, Eduardo Falu, Jaime Dávalos and himself. The album was abducted by the military regime, prohibiting its distribution.

He returned to Argentina on 29 October 1983, when he had been democratically elected President Raúl Alfonsín, at which time it provided a pointed recital at the Estadio Obras Sanitarias. At the time of return from exile, Isella participated in historical performances, as he did in the Luna Park with Horacio Guarany, the Cosquín Festival in the summer of 1984 and Sanitation mass readings of Silvio Rodríguez and Pablo Milanés, singers censored by the military regime.

In 1984 he made with Victor Heredia and Quartet Zupay the show "Song for poetry", poems set to music composed by Pablo Neruda, Maria Elena Walsh and José Pedroni presented with a resounding success in the Luna Park, recital which later was released on an album that sold 300,000 copies. That year also made an unprecedented call for young authors, receiving more than 1,000 songs, of which selected ten, with which he composed his album dawn Fragile.

In 1985 presented in the Teatro Alvear in Buenos Aires "Isella to All", with the participation of Armando Tejada Gómez, the Cuchi Leguizamón, Los Trovadores, Teresa Parodi, Los Carabajal, the National Argentine Folk Ballet of the Chúcaro and Norma Viola and The Huancara, among others. That same year, even during the government's dictatorship Augusto Pinochet, it was reintroduced in Chile, after thirteen years of ban.

In 1987 started a radio program broadcast music by Radio Excelsior (then Radio La Red), which continues until today (2008). In 1993 made the album Song to benefit all of the UNESCO, in which the famous theme song is played Joan Manuel Serrat, Silvio Rodríguez, Pablo Milanés, Tania Libertad, Guadalupe Pineda, Jairo, Manuel Mijares, Osvaldo Pugliese, Inti-Illimani, Miguel Mateos, Ástor Piazzolla, Atahualpa Yupanqui, Lito Vitale and himself. The album received the ACE Awards.

In 1995, on the occasion of the Meeting of the Ibero-American Summit in Punta Arenas, Chile, sings "Song to everybody", and makes singing group leaders Latin Americans, including Fidel Castro, King Juan Carlos I of Spain, Felipe González, Eduardo Frei and others. That same year he participates All the Voices Festival, organized in Quito by Ecuadorian painter Oswaldo Guayasamín, along with prominent Latin American singers, at that time gave him his portrait Guayasamín dedicated.

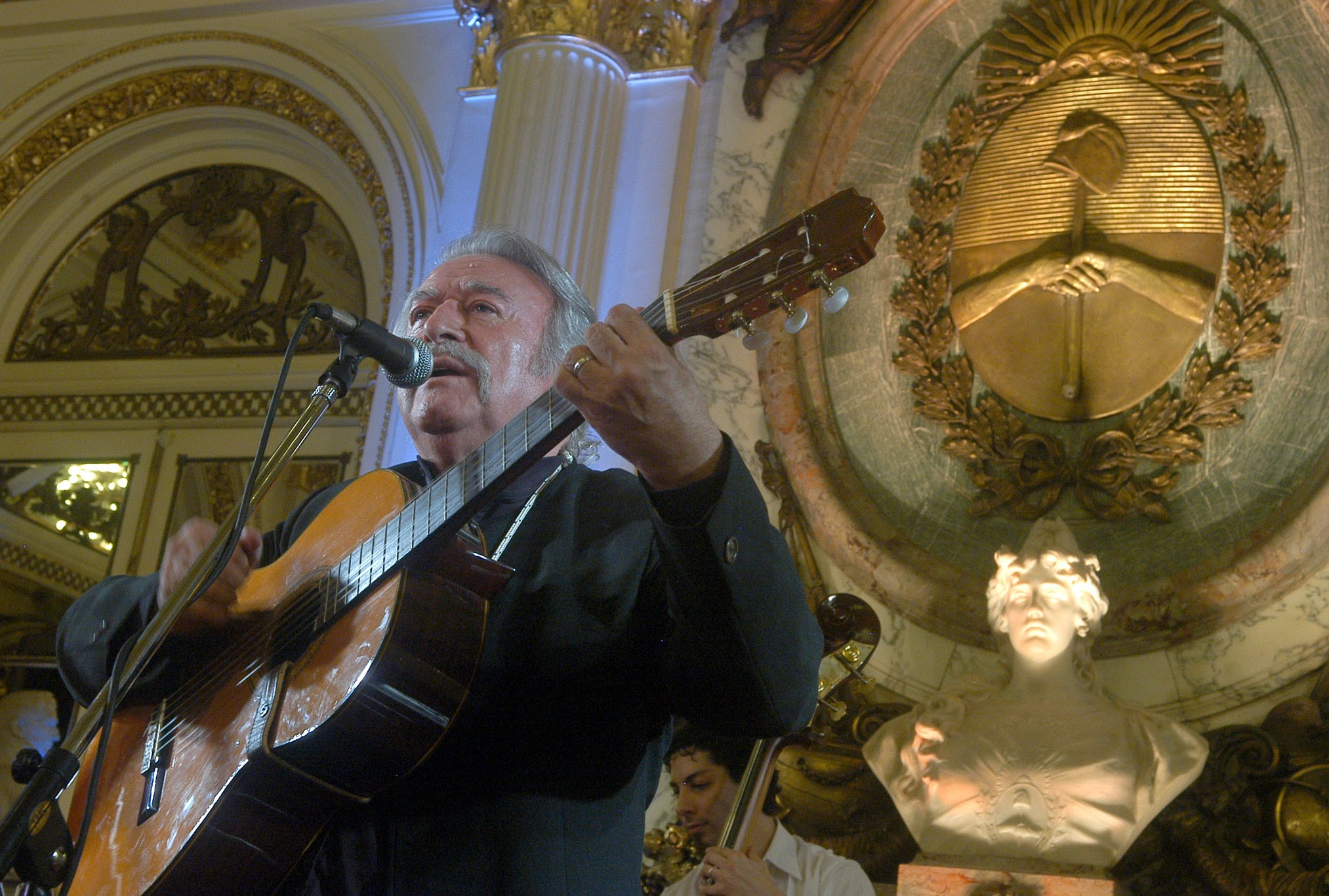
César Isella singing at the White Hall of the Casa Rosada, 2008.

Between 1995 and 1997, for three successive editions, he directed the "Official Peña National Folklore Festival Cosquin, developing a policy for participation of young artists. Some of the singers that emerged in these presentations are Ruben Patagonia, Adrian Maggi, Soledad, Luciano Pereyra, Los Tekis and others.

In 1999 United States bought the rights to "Song with all" to be studied in high schools as nonmetallic study of music and Latin American culture.

In 2007, coinciding with the 50-year career, Isella released the album 50 years of simple things and an autobiography.

He was Director General of the Teatro General San Martín, and vice president of the Sociedad Argentina de Autores y Compositores de Música (SADAIC). It musicalizado poets like Nicolas Guillen, José Pedroni and Pablo Neruda. Apart from "Song to everybody", Isella has composed many outstanding songs, including "Animaná Fire", "Song of the simple things", "song by far", "Song for awakening a black (poetry of Nicolás Guillén), "Song of Tenderness", "The nation divided" (poetry by Pablo Neruda, etc.).

He died from a coronary disease.

== Awards ==
- First Prize Fray Bentos, Uruguay, 1970.
- Martin Fierro Award for the best music radio program, 1974
- First Prize at the National Festival from Cosquín
- Golden Disk 1962, 1964, 1974, 1982
- First Prize at the Festival de la Patagonia, Chile
- Prize at the World Song Festival Agustín Lara, Mexico
- ACE Award for the album Tribute to Poetry,1993.
