= Opus Cuatro =

Argentine folk vocal quartet

Opus Cuatro are an Argentine folk vocal quartet founded in La Plata in 1968. The group debuted on 10 July 1968 and become one of the most important vocal groups in Latin America, staying active since then without interruption. At the beginning of 2009, the quartet had carried out 7,100 performances in 450 cities worldwide, including 25 tours in Europe and nine in the United States.

The founder members were Alberto Hassan (first tenor), Antonio Bugallo (second tenor), Lino Bugallo (baritone) and Federico Galiana (bass). Bugallo left the group in 1972, and was replaced first by Hannibal Bresca and then Ruben Verna until Marcelo Balsells was incorporated in 1982 and has remained ever since.

== Discography ==
1. América, 1970
2. Con América en la sangre, 1971
3. Si somos americanos, 1973
4. Opus Cuatro-Op. 4 - Vol IV, 1976
5. Opus Cuatro-CBS, 1980
6. Militantes de la vida, 1984
7. Un nuevo tiempo, 1987
8. Por amor, 1992
9. Jazz, spirituals, musicals, 1993
10. Opus Cuatro canta con los coros argentinos, 1994
11. No dejes de cantar, 1996
12. Opus Cuatro canta con los coros argentinos, volumen II, 1997
13. Milagro de amor, 1998
14. Opus Cuatro, se vuelve a más, 1999 (edición para Europa)
15. Cantata al Gral. Don José de San Martín, 1999, dirección musical de Luis María Serra
16. Opus Cuatro. Europa en vivo, 2000
17. Opus Cuatro, tangos, valses y milongas, 2001
18. Los opus y los vientos, 2003, con el grupo Cuatro Vientos (Julio Martínez, Jorge Polanuer, Diego Maurizi, Leo Heras)
19. Spirituals, blues & jazz, 2005
20. Opus Cuatro canta con los coros argentinos, volumen III, 2007
21. Latinoamérica vive, 2007, Radio Nederland
22. Opus Cuatro. Cuarenta años de canto, 2008

== See more ==
- Argentine music
