= Alberto Lysy =

Argentine violinist & conductor (1935–2009)

Alberto Lysy

Alberto Lysy (February 11, 1935 – December 30, 2009) was an Argentine violinist and conductor of Ukrainian ancestry.

The violin gifted to him was a very old Stradivarius. Among his friends were Charlie Chaplin and family whose Swiss home M. Lysy visited for extended stays.

== Early life ==
Alberto Lysy was born in Buenos Aires to Ukrainian immigrants in 1935. At age five, his father introduced him to the violin. Lysy left school at age 13 to devote more time to the instrument, and was subsequently trained by violinist Ljerko Spiller. Lysy traveled to London in 1952, where he enrolled in the Silver School; soon destitute, however, he made ends meet by playing under a bridge near the Royal National Theatre. Following a performance for UNESCO in Paris, he returned to Argentina in 1953, though a second opportunity in 1955 took him again to Europe, where he became the first South American artist to obtain a prize at the Queen Elisabeth International Music Competition, held that year in Brussels. Following the awards ceremony, the Queen Consort Princess Lilian, gave Lysy a vintage violin, and later invited him to the Royal Palace of Brussels for a series of duets.

== Professional life ==
Lysy approached a member of the jury to that occasion, Yehudi Menuhin, with a request that the renowned violinist make him a student. Menuhin had never mentored a pupil, and Lysy returned to Buenos Aires. Narrowly skirting military conscription (mandatory in Argentina until 1994), Lysy was recommended by Menuhin for a Rockefeller Foundation grant, and he rejoined his benefactor in Gstaad (becoming his first and only personal pupil). He lived and performed with Menuhin for the next several years, and the elder performer gave him a prized Guarnerius violin, dated 1742. Menuhin arranged performances for Lysy with consular figures in classical music such as cellist Pablo Casals, pianist Benjamin Britten, and conductor Nadia Boulanger.

Returning to Argentina, he established a chamber music ensemble, Camerata Bariloche, in 1967. Touring extensively and around the world, he set aside a select group of students to create Camerata Lysy, in 1971. Directing both groups for the next decade, Lysy and these ensembles performed with numerous celebrated conductors and orchestras, including Pierre Boulez, Adrian Boult, Colin Davis, Igor Markevitch, the New York Philharmonic, the National Symphony Orchestra (Washington, DC), the London Symphony Orchestra, the London Philharmonic, and the Amsterdam Philharmonic Orchestra. He has appeared at the Concertgebouw in Amsterdam, the Queen Elizabeth Hall of London, and Victoria Hall (Geneva), as well as in the former Soviet Union, China and Japan. The ensembles recorded numerous albums for the EMI label.

Lysy honored his mentor by founding the International Menuhin Music Academy, in 1977, in Gstaad. He also established musical events such as the Festival Delle Nazioni in Città di Castello and directed the Recontres Musicales in Switzerland and the Lysy Festival in Argentina. His work with children earned him the Stradivari International Pedagogical Prize in 2006, and he retired as Director of the Menuhin Music Academy, the following year.

== Personal life ==
Lysy married Benedetta Origo, daughter of Iris Origo. One of his children, Antonio Lysy, became a renowned cellist and is the head of the music program at UCLA in Los Angeles.

The renowned performer and teacher died in Lausanne on December 30, 2009; he was 74.

== Legacy ==
The Alberto Lysy International Violin Competition, which is held biennially in Gstaad, is named in his memory.
