= El Galpón, Salta =

Coordinates: 25°23′S 64°38′W

El Galpón (Salta)
- Municipality and town
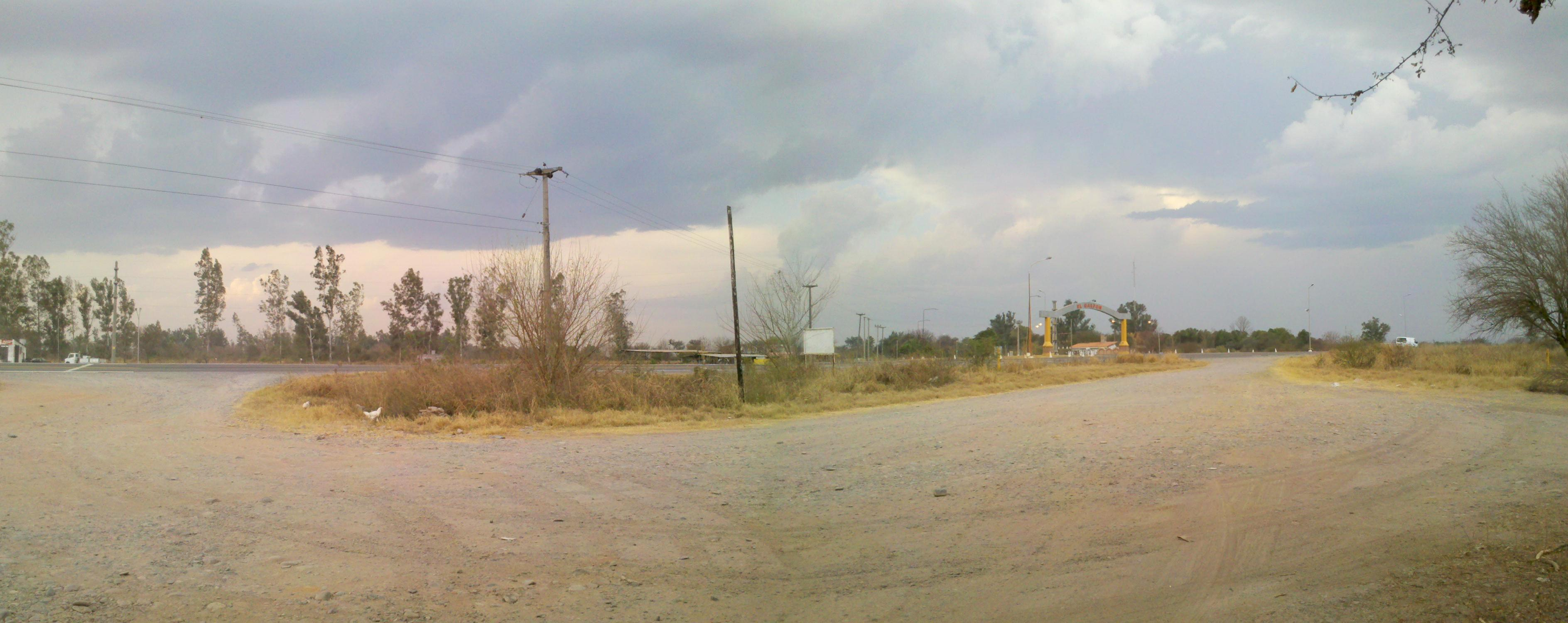
- Interactive map of El Galpón (Salta)
- Country: Argentina
- Province: Salta Province
- Time zone: UTC−3 (ART)

El Galpón (Salta) is a town and municipality in Salta Province in northwestern Argentina.
