= José Pedroni =

Argentine poet

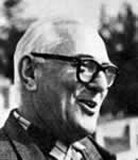
José Pedroni.

José Bartholomew Pedroni Fantino (September 21, 1899 – 4 February 1968) was an Argentine poet.

== Biography ==
José Pedroni was born in the city of Gálvez, Santa Fe province in Argentina. His parents were Gaspar Pedroni and Felisa Fantino. He lived most of his life in Esperanza, Santa Fe Province.

He married Elena Chautemps on 27 March 1920 and they had four children; his last child and only daughter, Ana Maria Pedroni, was also a writer.

He died from cardiac decompensation in 1968 in Mar del Plata, Buenos Aires Province.

== Poetic work ==
His poems include:

- "La gota de agua" ("The drop of water") (1923)
- "Gracia plena" ("Grace Full") (1925)
- "Poemas y palabras" ("Poems and words") (1935)
- "Diez Mujeres" ("Ten Women") (1937)
- "El pan nuestro" ("The bread and butter") (1941)
- "Nueve cantos" ("Nine songs") (1944)
- "Monsieur Jaquín" (1956)
- "Cantos del hombre" ("Songs of Man") y "Canto a Cuba" ("Singing to Cuba") (1960)
- "La hoja voladora" ("flying leaf") (1961)
- "El nivel y su lágrima" ("The level and tear") (1963)

== Centenary of his birth ==
It has always been considered the highest literary figure of the city of Esperanza, whose community has honored and remembered on many occasions. In 1999, on the occasion of the centenary of his birth, on 21 September, a Tribute Committee carries out various activities to remember the poet. In particular, a special publication of the newspaper The West Settler by Esperanza, developed by Professor Nelly Morandi Müller, which chronicles his life through his own poetic work, enriching the story with multiple photographic images that reflect different stages of the life of José Pedroni, from his private collection which were presented by the poet's family.
