= Eduardo Falú =

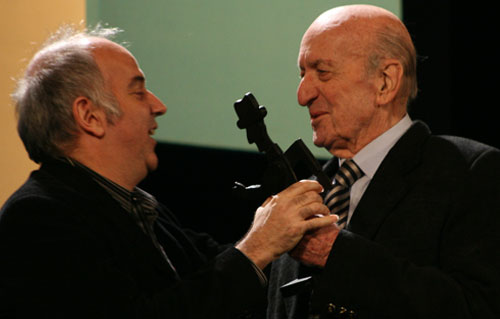
- Eduardo Falú (right)

Background information
- Born: July 7, 1923; El Galpón, Salta, Argentina
- Died: August 9, 2013 (aged 90); Buenos Aires, Argentina
- Genres: Chacarera; Chamamé; Zamba
- Occupations: Composer; Folk musician; Guitarist
- Instrument: Guitar
- Years active: 1945–2009
- Website: FaluFilm.com

Eduardo Falú (July 7, 1923 – August 9, 2013) was an Argentine folk music guitarist and composer.

== Life and work ==
Eduardo Falú was born in El Galpón, a village near San José de Metán in the province of Salta, in 1923. His parents, Fada and Juan Falú, were Syrian immigrants. Raised in rural surroundings, he was strongly influenced by the folk traditions of Salta (which remain, in Falú's words, "something lively, dynamic and evolutionary").

Falú was given his first guitar as a gift during childhood, and he began to perform traditional folk tunes of the Argentine Northwest as a troubadour. He formed a duo with César Perdiguero, and became well known in the region during the 1940s. Largely self-taught, Falú deepened his knowledge of the guitar through the study of the 19th century masters and was trained in harmony and theory by the prominent Argentine composer Carlos Guastavino.

His increasing renown brought him to Buenos Aires in 1945, and he recorded his first album there in 1950. Among the volume of collaborations with many of the leading Argentine poets, perhaps the best-known are his compositions for lyrics written by Jaime Dávalos, among which some of the most popular are Zamba de la Candelaria, Trago de sombra, and Canción del jangadero. Falú wrote music for a number of Argentine historical epics, as well, including Romance de la Muerte de Juan Lavalle (written by Ernesto Sábato) and José Hernández (by Jorge Luis Borges).

He performed overseas for the first time in Paris, in 1959. This was followed by performances in Rome, Los Angeles, Madrid, and numerous other cultural capitals. He was particularly popular in Japan, where from 1963 to 1973, he gave over 200 performances; in subsequent years, he also performed regularly in duos with his nephew, Juan Falú.

Arguably the creator of Argentina's modern folk song movement, Falú has set over 150 poems to music. These have included Borges' and Dávalos', as well as those by León Benarós, Manuel J. Castilla, and Alberico Mansilla. Known for his Chamamé, Chacarera and Zamba compositions, Falú more recently composed two suites, Primera Suite Argentina (1996) and Segunda Suite Argentina (1999).

The Government of Peru bestowed on him a Distinguished Service Award, and Falú's work earned him important recognition by his Argentine colleagues in 1985, when he received the highest honor in the Argentine cultural realm, the Konex Award, as well as a Grand Prize by the Argentine Society of Music Composers (SADAIC).

Falú's last album as a performer, published in 2009, was a tribute to classical Spanish guitarist Andrés Segovia. He died on August 9, 2013, at his home in the city of Buenos Aires, Argentina; he was 90.
