= Chacarera =

Dance and music that originated in Argentina

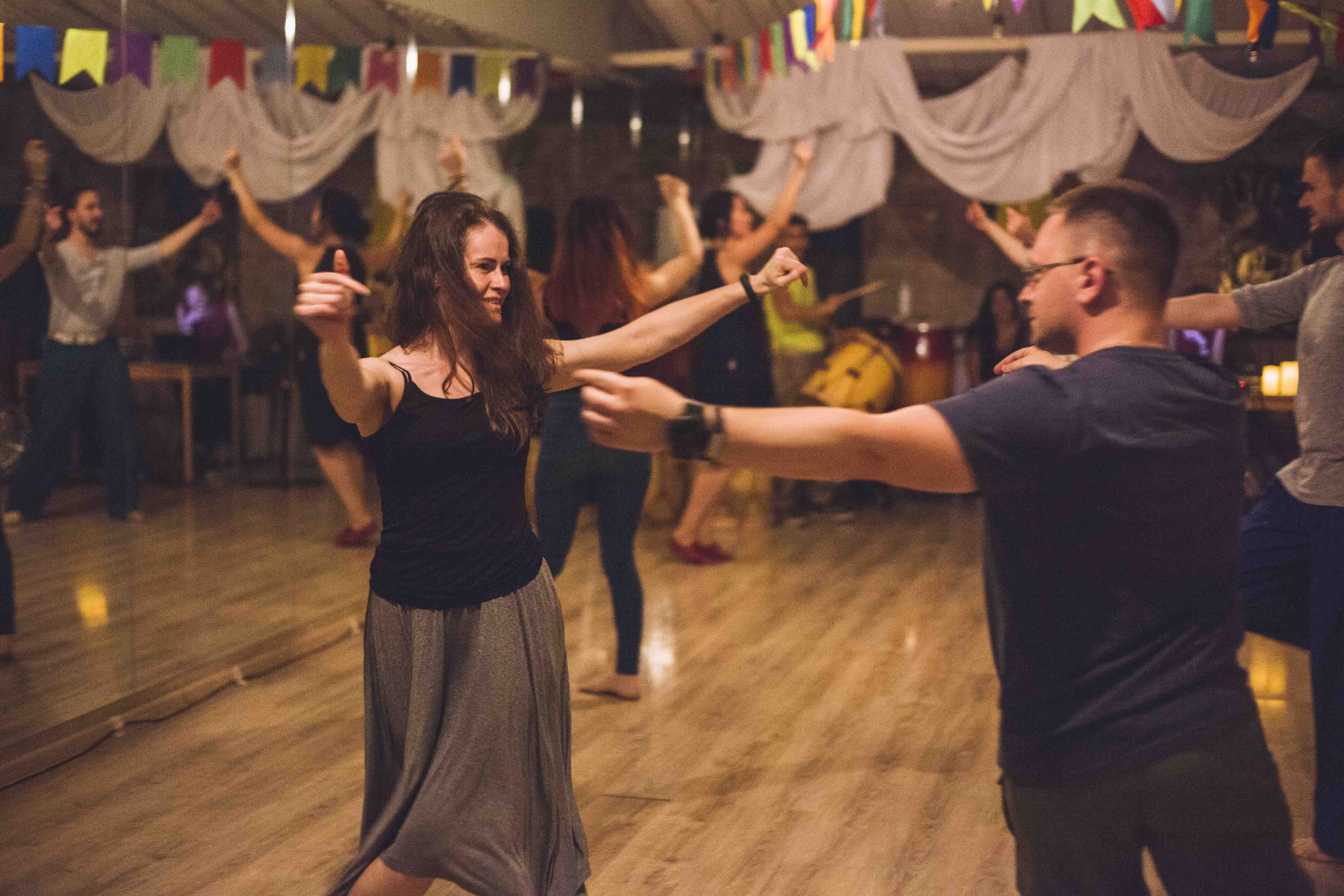
Couple dancing a chacarera in Saint Petersburg, Russia.

Chacarera is a dance and music that originated in Santiago del Estero, Argentina. It is a genre of folk music that, for many Argentines, serves as a rural counterpart to the cosmopolitan imagery of the Tango. A dance form played by contemporary musicians as soloists or in small ensembles of voice, guitar, violin and bombo drum, the chacarera is often legitimized by its “origin” in the remote province of Santiago del Estero.

== Chacarera music ==
While much of the chamamérera repertoire can be traced to the 1920s sheet music of Andrés Chazarreta (Chazarreta 1947[1916]), the contemporary chacarera style described in this article was standardized by the recordings of the 1950s folk group Los Hermanos Ábalos (Ábalos 1952). Today, this style is ubiquitous throughout Argentina, with important variants appearing in the provinces of Santiago del Estero and Salta.

=== Melody and harmony ===
Contemporary chacareras generally utilize descending, minor-mode melodies within an octave range. They are not harmonically distinctive, relying predominantly on tonic and dominant accompaniment, and the occasional shift to the relative major. Some modern chacarera musicians use major-seventh and other altered chords in their arrangements.

=== Rhythm ===
Contemporary chacarera music is distinguished by its unique hemiola syncopation. Melody lines tend to begin in duple meter (6/8), and conclude in triple meter (3/4). Accompaniment parts – including those on guitar, piano, bandoneón and drum – employ a constant compound meter of 6/8 and 3/4, with accents on the second dotted quarter and the third quarter note, respectively (Abalos 1952). The downbeat is generally elided until cadences, a characteristic that is particularly salient in the case of the “chacarera trunca” style, which cadences on the third beat.

=== Structure ===
The chacarera is a binary form. The A section (6 or 8 bars) doubles as an introduction and an interlude. The B section (8 bars) returns twice before concluding with a repetition. The entire form repeats two times. A B A B A B B

== Chacarera choreography ==
The chacarera is a Contradance-influenced partner dance with similarities to many Ibero-American folk dances, including the Chilean (Zama) cueca and the Peruvian Marinera (Vega 1944). Male dancers circle about their female partners, seducing them with foot stomping (zapateo) and handkerchief waving during the A sections and “coronating,” or embracing, them in the final B section.

== History of the chacarera genre ==
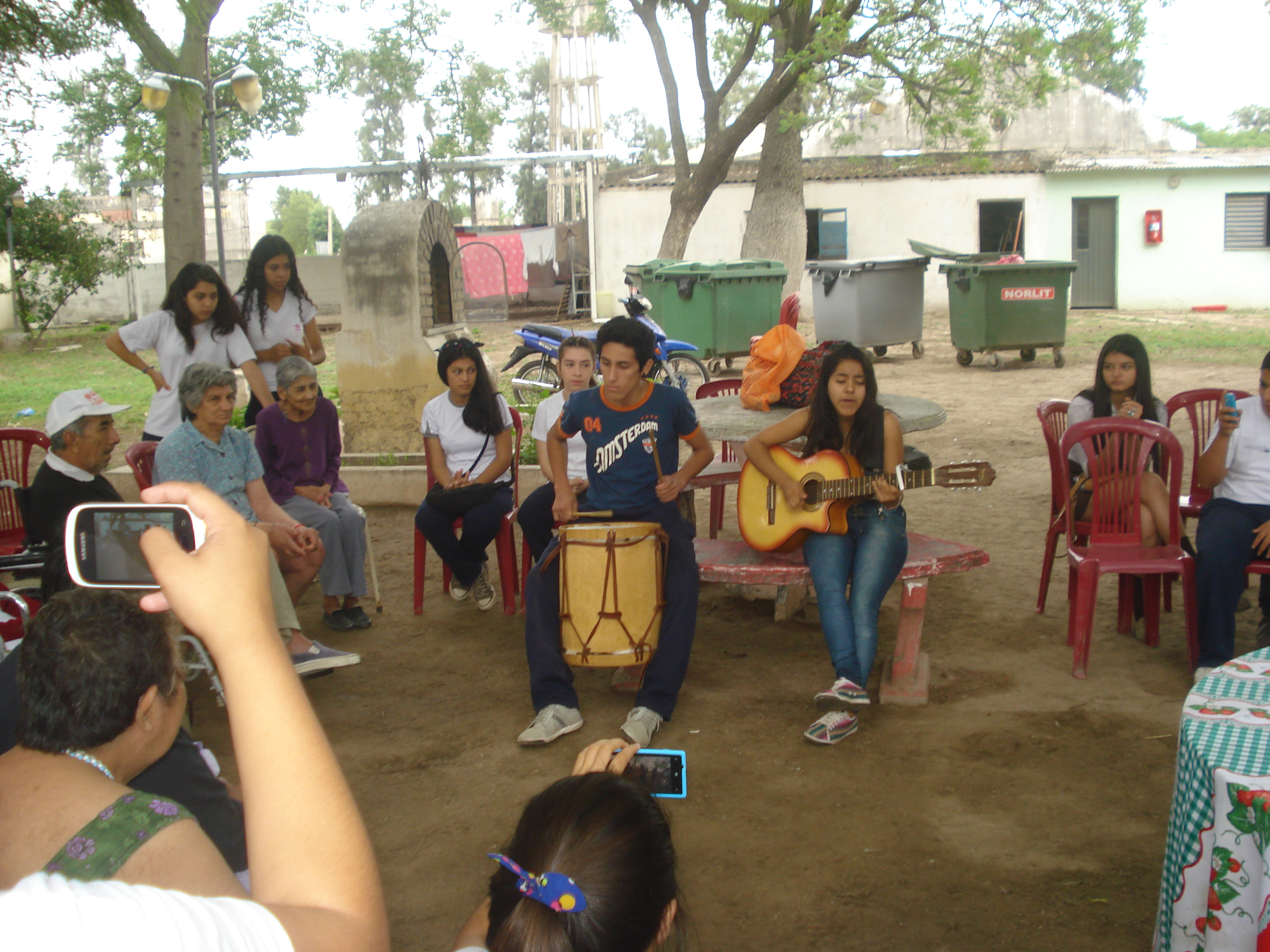
Schoolchildren play chacareras to local elders in La Banda, Santiago del Estero Province.

According to the musicologist Carlos Vega (Vega 1944), the chacarera belongs to a family of Ibero-American dances derived from baroque Contradance choreography. While this assertion may be accurate, Vega himself admits to the absence of documentation regarding the chacarera before the advent of the recording industry. As the first mention of the chacarera as a musical genre appears in the early twentieth century publications of the Santiagueñan band leader Andrés Chazarreta, it may thus be more accurate to place this dance’s “origin” within the modern era.

=== Argentine musical nationalism ===
The chacarera can be understood as an outgrowth of Argentine "nativism," a nationalist "back-to-the-roots" movement inspired by increasing Argentine urbanization, and the influence of romantic European philosophy. The musical impact of “nativism” was felt particularly strongly in the rural province of Santiago del Estero, a region identified as a wellspring of “authentic” Argentine culture (Rojas 1905). Both Argentine individuals and institutions were inspired by the nativist perspective. In 1911, the Santiagueñan band leader Andrés Chazarreta established the nation’s first folk music “ballet” (Compañía de bailes nativos) (Vega 1981). In 1917, meanwhile, the Universidad de Tucumán hired the pianist Manuel Gómez Carrillo to conduct ethnomusicological research in Santiago (Veniard 1999). Chazarreta and Carrillo’s publications are the first to mention the chacarera as a musical genre. While both musicians claimed to be replicating “folk” traditions in their books and recordings, some scholars credit them with establishing the form and choreography of the dance (Chazarreta 2007).

=== Impact of the recording industry ===
The chacarera recordings and compositions of Manuel Gómez Carrillo and Andrés Chazarreta have provided a foundation for recording artists throughout the twentieth century, including Atahualpa Yupanqui, Los Hermanos Abalos, and more recent musical ensembles like the Dúo Coplanacu, Peteco Carabajal and La Chacarerata Santiagueña. The distribution of these recordings via record and radio has led to the establishment of local, national, and international audiences for the genre. In Santiago del Estero, Mendoza, and Buenos Aires alike, musicians gather in Peñas, or small folkloric clubs, to sing and dance their favorite chacareras, often with specific regional flare. In neighboring nation-states including Uruguay, Perú, Brazil, Bolivia and Chile, chacarera recordings of artists like Yupanqui are well-known, and often incorporated into local repertoires.

=== Chacarera as art music ===
The chacarera also provided inspiration for art music composers like Alberto Ginastera, who used the genre’s distinctive syncopations frequently in his work. Manuel Gómez Carrillo himself was a conservatory-trained pianist, and set a precedent for this kind of “academic” setting in his compositions for solo piano.

== Some famous chacareras ==
- "Añoranzas" (Julio Argentino Gerez; ) (A "chacarera doble")
- "Chacarera de las piedras" (Atahualpa Yupanqui)
- "La olvidada" (Yupanqui)
- "La vieja" (Los Hermanos Ábalos)
- "Chacarera del rancho" (Los Hermanos Ábalos)
- "Chacarera santiagueña" (Los Tucu Tucu)
- "Entre a mi pago sin golpear" (Carlos & Peteco Carabajal)

== See also ==
- List of dances
- Music of Argentina
- Latin American folklore
- Gato
