= Camerata Bariloche =

Argentinian chamber music ensemble

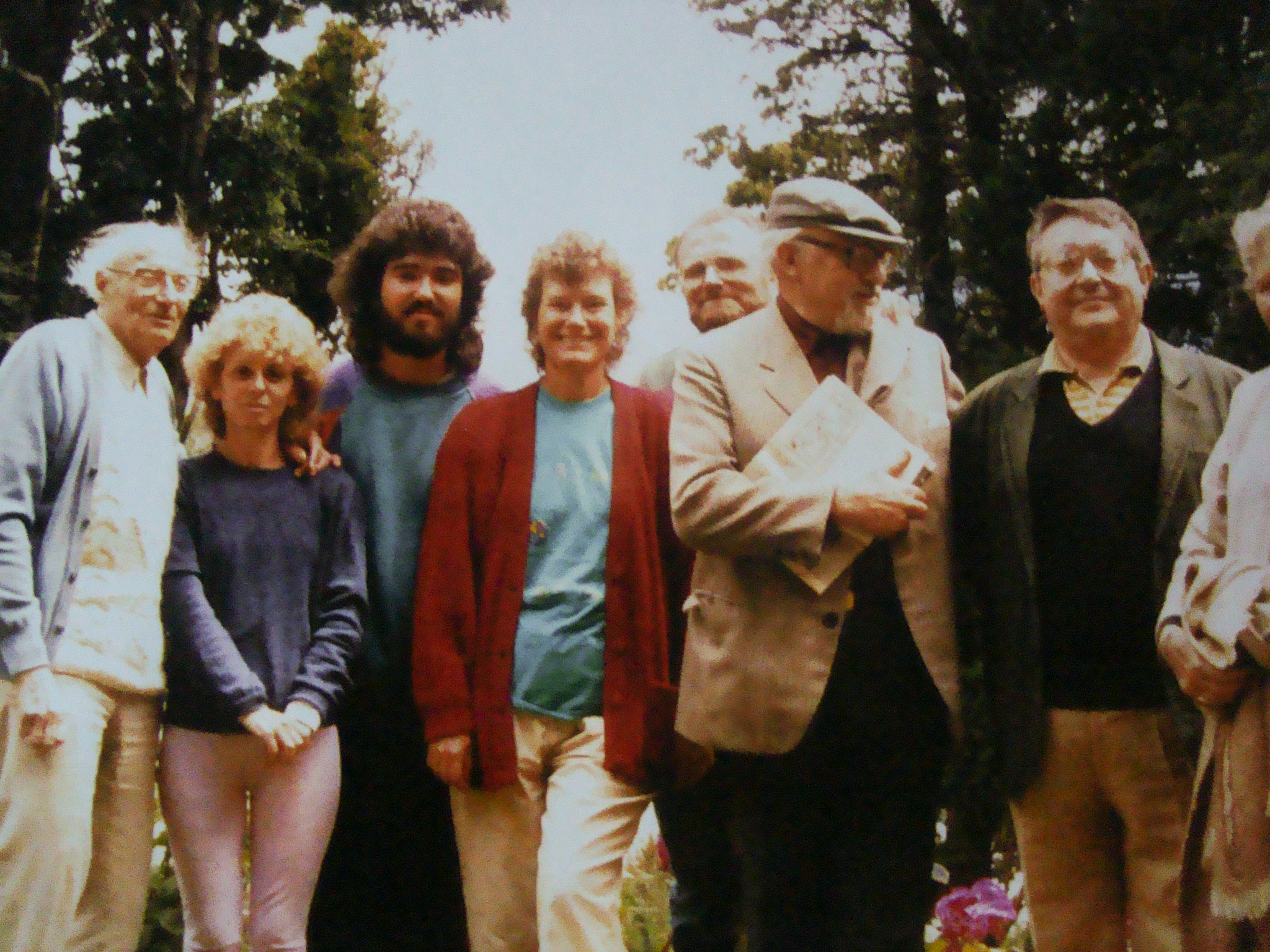
Members of Camerata Bariloche

The Camerata Bariloche is a chamber music ensemble from Argentina, founded in 1967. The ensemble has achieved international recognition for excellence.

== Origins ==
The Camerata was formed by musician Alberto Lysy, who organized the Camping Musical Bariloche Chamber Music Festival in Buenos Aires which is attended by both local and foreign musicians. A number of musicians traveled to Bariloche to serve as teachers during development of the music camp, and by 1967 Lysy had organized a series of tests with these musicians in the Bariloche Foundation's headquarters in a house called Soria Moria. The Camerata Bariloche performed its first concert at the Library Sarmiento de Bariloche on September 17, 1967. Originally the Camerata Bariloche was funded by the Fundación Bariloche, but it soon became independent.

== Directors ==
The first director of the ensemble was Alberto Lysy, who was succeeded by Rubén González y Elias Khayat. In 1992 its director was Fernando Hasaj. The Camerata is composed of about twenty musicians selected from among the best in Argentina. In 2015, the ensemble's director is Freddy Varela Montero.

== Soloists ==
The Camerata Bariloche has played with numerous soloists, including: Martha Argerich, Ernesto Bitteti, Anna and Nicolas Chumachenko, Katherine Ciesinsky, Eduardo Falu, Gerardo Gandini, Antonio Janigro, Cho-Liang Lin, Yehudi Menuhin, Oscar Milani, Ástor Piazzolla, Jean-Pierre Rampal, Manuel Rego, Ljerko Spiller, Vadin Repin, Karl Richter, Mstislav Rostropovich, Janos Starker, Jean Yves Thibaudet, Jaime Torres, Maxim Vengeroff and Frederica von Stade.

== Accomplishments ==
Since its inception, the Camerata has performed over 2500 concerts and has 25 international tours to his credit. The ensemble has made and issued 31 recordings. The Camerata Bariloche has been awarded the Premio Konex de Platino (Platinum Konex Award) as the best chamber ensemble in the history of music in Argentina (1989, 2009). In 2009 Camerata received "The Music Critics Association of Argentina" award for its work during 2009.
