= Doble Vida =

Studio album by Soda Stereo
- Released: September 15, 1988
- Recorded: July–August 1988
- Studio: Sorcerer Sound, New York
- Genre: Pop rock, new wave
- Length: 42:31
- Label: Discos CBS; Columbia
- Producer: Carlos Alomar

Soda Stereo chronology
Ruido Blanco (1987)	Doble Vida (1988)	Languis (1989)

Singles from Doble Vida
- 1. "En la Ciudad de la Furia" Released: July 1988; 2. "Lo que sangra (La cúpula)" Released: October 1988; 3. "Picnic en el 4 B" Released: January 1989; 4. "Corazón delator" Released: April 1989

Doble Vida (English: Double Life) is the fourth studio album by Argentine rock band Soda Stereo, released on September 15, 1988. Produced by Carlos Alomar, this was the second of only 2 Soda Stereo albums produced by someone outside the musical group, with the other being Soda Stereo, the eponymous debut album produced by Federico Moura of Virus.

The group began preparing the songs for Doble Vida in March 1988. Soon after, Gustavo Cerati decided to hire Carlos Alomar as an artistic producer; an American musician, composer and producer. Carlos Alomar prepared a structured and innovative process for creating the album in the manner of American works, different from what had been seen until then in Latin American music. He summoned the musical group in early June to record it in New York City, this being one of the first Latin American rock albums in history to be recorded in the United States. Finally after just over a month, Doble Vida was presented on July 7 at The Tunnel club in New York, and released on September 23.

Doble Vida marked the end of the first stage of Soda Stereo, which consisted of an exotic image, and paved the way for the band's maturity. In addition, it was during the promotional tour that they decided to resign from Ohanian Producciones and create their own company, Triple Producciones, with which they would publish works in the future. Doble Vida in particular is loaded with a strong influence of African-American music, with a marked presence of funk in particular, and also touches of soul, disco, R&B and even a rap in the song "En el borde".

The album allowed them to conquer the United States market, making Soda Stereo the first Latin American band in history to do so. The tour, which spanned the entire American continent, even reached Los Angeles' historic Hollywood Palace (later renamed Avalon Hollywood). During the course of it, the milestone of being awarded by the CBS record company was produced, for having sold more than 1 million copies.

It was remastered in 2007 at Sterling Sound in New York.

== History ==
=== Background ===
After Ruido Blanco promotional tour ended, in March 1988 the band settled in the rehearsal room to put together the songs for a new studio album. While they were recording the demos, Ohanian Producciones was considering hiring an artistic producer. Those targeted were Mark Knopfler and Carlos Alomar. However, Mark Knopfler could not be available for 3 months, and also that Gustavo himself wanted to work with the Puerto Rican musician. Cerati had met Carlos in a music house in New York by pure chance, whom he took advantage of to show his admiration. After this fortuitous meeting, Cerati sends him a package with original demos for Soda's next album, and within a few hours Alomar replies that not only did he like the demos, but he was interested in working with them. For these reasons, he ended up being chosen for this production.

From early on it was decided that the title of the album was going to be Doble Vida, which was the one they preferred the most; although other possible names were also considered, such as La ciudad de la furia.

=== Carlos Alomar ===
Carlos Alomar was one of the best musicians on the market, he had participated for years with David Bowie, and had worked with Paul McCartney, James Brown, Iggy Pop, and Mick Jagger, among other artists.

Executive producer Alberto Ohanian was amazed at Carlos Alomar's idea to create the album; he according to him commented:

In April I traveled to finalize the details of the recording, and when I met Alomar I was impressed by his real knowledge of the working times to make an album. He was the right person to produce this record. During three days, he meticulously prepared the work schedule, which included a week of rehearsals and recording in three different studios.

At the beginning of June the first part of their plan was carried out, meeting in New York and rehearsing at Dessau Studios to get the first ideas. Then the second part was moving to Sorcerer Sound Studios, where the album itself was recorded. First they recorded the basic tracks, with the whole band playing together, something that Gustavo Cerati highlighted because until then he had not worked like this, where the essence of live was captured. Then they added the melodies to the basics: Carlos Alomar's guitar, Gustavo Cerati's voice, a horn section (which accompanied David Bowie) and even a rap on the song "En el borde" sung by Carlos Alomar. So in the third part of the plan, the group divided, leaving only Gustavo Cerati and Zeta Bosio in New York to do the mastering at Masterdisk Studios, while Charly Alberti and Daniel Sais returned to Buenos Aires. A week later Doble Vida was finished.

== Recording ==
Black music from the United States, or Afro-American music, is the main "actress" in the album Doble Vida, with a strong influence in particular from funk, with enveloping and marked rhythms to dance. Other African-American genres, such as soul, disco, and R&B, also make their presence on the album, and even rap, which was just beginning to make its presence felt in the American music scene of the 1980s, appears on the track. border sung in English by Carlos Alomar. This rap is perhaps the first rap on a record by a rock band born in Latin America.

Carlos Alomar had a wealth of experience working with many American and British artists in various musical styles, as well as keeping abreast of the latest news in the world of music, such as rap; a musical, cultural and social phenomenon that would soon explode in mainstream culture. At the same time, prior to forming Soda Stereo, Gustavo Cerati had played soul and disco in a band called Sauvage, something that in the end would be useful for Doble Vida and a large part of his work.

Most of the songs on Doble Vida had already been developed for a while, according to Gustavo in an interview in July 1990 with Rock & Pop magazine:

The ten themes of Canción Animal were composed in a period that goes from August of '89 to March of '90. In other words, they are really new, unlike Doble Vida, where, for example, songs like "Corazón delator", "Languis", "Picnic (en el 4ºB)", "La ciudad de la furia" and even "Día Común - Doble Vida" were final developments of basic tracks that we had been playing intermittently since -in some cases- the first LP.

During the recording of Doble Vida, Carlos Alomar tried to reproduce the strength of Soda Stereo's live performances, so he arranged for Gustavo, Zeta, Charly and Daniel Sais to play together to build the basic trcks to which they would later add elements. Gustavo, who had never worked in this way, felt at ease. These were his impressions of the album:

The style of the new album has a mix between the feeling of Nada Personal and the musicality of Signos. It is the return of something more funky and soulful, with a more finished theme and a sound closer to a live record.

Gustavo later defined Doble Vida as Soda Stereo's New York record. In addition, he has also declared that if it were not for the producer's hand and his stay in that special city, the sound of the album would have been closer to that of Canción Animal. On the other hand, he considered "Corazón delatoro" as one of his perfect songs:

When I finished "Corazón Delator" or "El Temblor", yes, I felt that I had found something that I thought would never be able to improve. It was the maximum within what I could do, considering that the main meaning of everything I write and compose aspires to produce a shot of imagination. I like the perfect song not because it's technically perfect, but because it inaugurates something or went deep.

== Release and packaging ==
To choose the album cover, a long series of photographs of the band posing in the streets of Buenos Aires were taken.

The cover of Doble Vida is unusual in that it consists of a photograph taken vertically (3:4). The photo is taken in black and white. In it, the three members of the band are seen posing on different planes or angles, similar to the cover of the debut album, Soda Stereo, where that idea was also presented, although this time Charly Alberti is in front instead of behind. of the others, and it is Gustavo Cerati who is now in the background. The photo on the cover of the album was taken in the Monserrat neighborhood, Buenos Aires, exactly on the corner of Diagonal Sur, Av. Hipólito Yrigoyen and Bolívar street, that is, next to the Cabildo de Buenos Aires. The photo was taken focusing in the direction of Bolívar, behind the musicians you can see the Hotel NH Buenos Aires City, and other buildings on the corner of Bolívar and Alsina.

Completing the album cover, the photograph is placed on a white background with a new logo of the band made by the plastic artist Tite Barbuzza, and the title "Doble Vida" under the photo, all in gray tones.

=== Singles ===
The first single, "En la Ciudad de la Furia" (Spanish for "In the City of Fury"), was written by lead vocalist and guitarist Gustavo Cerati and released in 1989. The music video, released in 1989, was a finalist for the International Viewer's Choice in the 1990 MTV Video Music Awards. A remix version is included in the remix album Zona de Promesas, called "En la Ciudad de la Furia [Dance Mix]".

The music style of "En la Ciudad de la Furia" can be described as an alternative/gothic rock sound with some new wave elements and shows the new sound that the band had adopted, changing from their previous albums. This song is a "harbinger" of the sound that the band was about to adopt as its own, especially alternative rock, the style in which this song was performed. The song starts with a riff that Gustavo Cerati created when he was 14 years old. When Cerati begins to sing, the guitar stops, and the drums are alone with the bass guitar so that it makes a strong chord. After a while, the riff comes back.

The music video for "En la Ciudad de la Furia", which was directed by Alfredo Lois, was photographed in ambient black and white. Filmed in Buenos Aires (that appears to be "the city of fury" mentioned in the lyrics), it shows several downtown areas and buildings and people moving in that landscape.

"En la Ciudad de la Furia" has been played in most of the concerts by the band. One of the most significant performances was as the opening song of the last concert (El Último Concierto) by Soda Stereo on 20 September 1997, having a strong, distinctive final guitar solo. In the presentation at the MTV studios in Miami on 25 September 1996, recorded as the live album Comfort y Música Para Volar, the band completely changed the original version, with a blues style, being much slower and complex musically. This performance had Colombian singer Andrea Echeverri as a guest singer in the chorus. In the extensive Gira Me Verás Volver of 2007 (You'll See Me Come Back tour), in which the band reunited after 10 years of not playing together, this song was performed at every concert.

== Reception ==
Professional ratings
Review scores
Source	Rating
AllMusic	4/5 stars

From this album, the ranking of the 500 best Ibero-American rock songs by Al Borde in 2006 rewarded the successful song entitled "En la ciudad de la furia" (46th), one of the 100 best songs of Argentine rock by Rolling Stone Argentina and MTV in 2002 awarded it with the 48th, and one of the 10 best video clips of Argentine rock by La Nación in 2011 with the 1st, thus being chosen as the best music video of Argentine rock in all history.

== Track listing ==
All lyrics are written by Gustavo Cerati, except where noted.

Side A
No.	Title	Music	Lyrics	Length
1.	"Picnic En El 4° B" (Picnic in 4B)	Gustavo Cerati, Zeta Bosio, Charly Alberti		3:43
2.	"En La Ciudad De La Furia" (In the City of Fury)	Cerati		5:51
3.	"Lo Que Sangra (La Cúpula)" (What Bleeds (The Dome))	Cerati		4:35
4.	"En El Borde" (On The Edge)	Cerati, Bosio	Richard Coleman, Carlos Alomar (Rap)	4:45
5.	"Languis" (The Languid)	Cerati, Bosio, Alberti, Daniel Sais		4:01

Side B
No.	Title	Music	Lyrics	Length
1.	"Día Común - Doble Vida" (Ordinary Day - Double Life)	Cerati, Alberti		4:41
2.	"Corazón Delator" (Tell-Tale Heart)	Cerati		5:51
3.	"El Ritmo De Tus Ojos" (The Rhythm Of Your Eyes)	Cerati, Bosio		3:57
4.	"Terapia De Amor Intensiva" (Intensive Love Therapy)	Cerati, Alberti	Cerati, Coleman	5:41
Total length:				43:05

== Personnel ==
=== Soda Stereo ===
- Gustavo Cerati – lead vocals, electric and acoustic guitars
- Zeta Bosio – bass, backing vocals
- Charly Alberti – drums, percussion

=== Additional personnel ===
- Daniel Sais – keyboards
- Lenny Pickett – tenor saxophone
- Marcelo Sánchez – saxophone
- Chris Botti – trumpet
- Carlos Alomar – producer, lead guitar on "Lo Que Sangra (La Cupula)", rap on "En El Borde", backing vocals

== Charting singles ==
Chart performance for "En la Ciudad de la Furia"
Chart (2014)	Peak position
US Latin Digital Song Sales (Billboard)	41

=== Certifications ===
Certifications for "En la Ciudad de la Furia"
Region	Certification	Certified units/sales
Mexico (AMPROFON)	Gold	30,000^{*}
^{*} Sales figures based on certification alone.

== Certifications ==
Certifications for Doble Vida
Region	Certification	Certified units/sales
Mexico (AMPROFON)	Gold	100,000^{‡}
^{‡} Sales+streaming figures based on certification alone.
