= Me Verás Volver =

Me Verás Volver (Hits & +)

Compilation album by Soda Stereo
- Released: 2007
- Recorded: 1982–1995
- Genre: Alternative rock, pop rock
- Length: 78:44
- Label: Sony Music Argentina/Columbia
- Producer: Various

Soda Stereo chronology
El Último Concierto (1997)	Me Verás Volver (Hits & +) (2007)	Gira Me Verás Volver (Hits & +) (2008)

Me Verás Volver (Hits & +) is a compilation album released in July, 2007 by Argentine rock band Soda Stereo. The album shares the name with their comeback tour that started on October 19 of the same year, which in turn is taken from a line in their song 'En La Ciudad De La Furia'.

In June 2007, the band officially announced a reunion tour across Latin America with the purpose of commemorating the tenth anniversary of their last concert on September 20, 1997. On September 20, 2007 (exactly ten years later), the band gave their only press conference to promote the album and tour. This included an opening performance of 'Sobredosis De T.V.' and 'En La Ciudad De La Furia'. The album was accompanied by a download code which fans could use to gain access to extra material on the band's website.

== Track listing ==
1. "Sobredosis de T.V." – 4:08
2. "Trátame Suavemente" (Melero) – 3:21
3. "Juego De Seducción" – 3:18
4. "Cuando Pase el Temblor" – 3:49
5. "Nada Personal" – 4:52
6. "Signos" – 5:15
7. "Persiana Americana" (Cerati / Daffunchio) – 4:52
8. "Prófugos" (Cerati / Ficicchia) – 5:17
9. "Pic Nic en el 4B" (Bosio / Cerati / Ficicchia) – 3:39
10. "Corazón Delator" – 5:12
11. "En la Ciudad de la Furia" – 5:47
12. "De Música Ligera" (Bosio/Cerati) – 3:33
13. "Un Millón de Años Luz" (Alberti / Bosio / Cerati) – 5:04
14. "En Remolinos" – 4:39
15. "Primavera 0" – 3:39
16. "Zona de Promesas" – 3:59
17. "Ella Usó Mi Cabeza Como Un Revólver" (Alberti / Bosio / Cerati) – 4:29
18. "Zoom" (Alberti / Bosio / Cerati) – 3:26

All tracks written by Gustavo Cerati, except noted.

== Personnel ==
Soda Stereo

- Gustavo Cerati – lead vocals, guitars
- Zeta Bosio – bass guitar, backing vocals
- Charly Alberti – drums, percussion

== Certifications ==
Region	Certification	Certified units/sales
Argentina (CAPIF)	Platinum	40,000^{^}
Mexico (AMPROFON)	Gold	50,000^{^}
^{^} Shipments figures based on certification alone.
