= Signos (album) =

Studio album by Soda Stereo
- Released: November 1986
- Recorded: September–October 1986
- Studios: Moebio, Buenos Aires
- Genres: Post-punk, New wave
- Length: 41:04
- Label: CBS

Soda Stereo chronology
Nada Personal (1985)	Signos (1986)	Ruido Blanco (1987)

Singles from Signos
- 1. "Persiana Americana / No Existes" Released: 1986; 2. "Prófugos / Signos" Released: 1986

Signos (lit. 'Signs') is the third studio album by the Argentine rock band Soda Stereo, released on November 1986, by Columbia Records. It was recorded and produced Moebio Studios, located in Buenos Aires, with sessions starting mid-September 1986 and ending in mid-October. Not much detailed information is known about the recording of the album, as Moebio didn't preserve the recording sheets.

Before its recording, Soda Stereo went on holiday in Europe. After staying in Spain and France, they went to the United Kingdom, where they attended various festivals. Soda Stereo were inspired and influenced by the bands that they saw perform. Moreover, frontman Gustavo Cerati had problems with cocaine intoxication and had gone to the hospital several times. In its composition, Signos features a more acoustic sound and a more "classical" rock sound, with a tendency towards soul and post-punk influences. Across the tracks, instruments used in the 1970s are featured, like the Hammond organ and electric pianos. Furthermore, critics have argued that the album started an evolution in Cerati as a writer and composer.

The cover was designed Caito Lorenzo with help from Alfredo Lois, both of them having worked in previous projects, as a Polaroid art; due to the band wanting the album cover to be abstract. On the back there is more art that was made to represent every track of the album. Upon release, critics praised Cerati's guitar work and lyrics, along with Héctor "Zeta" Bosio's growth as bassist.

== Background and development ==
In June 1986, Soda Stereo went on holiday to various European countries for 25 days. The holiday started on the city of Madrid, Spain. Accompanied by Alberto Ohanian, manager of the band, an assistant of Ohanian and Fabián Quintiero, Argentine musician and friend of the band. The assistant came along with the band in an effort to expand his work in Europe and try to attract interest to produce the band's next album in Spain. For the next trip they went to France. After these two trips the band went to the United Kingdom, in this trip Soda Stereo went to various music festivals including the Glastonbury Festival. Here they met with Eddie Simmons, a future sound producer for the concerts in the Gira Animal. Simmons talked to the manager of U2 and of the Waterboys with the aim of to record covers of Soda Stereo's songs in English, in order to test the Western market. The managers contacted Lene Lovich, where she offered to record a version of "Juegos de Seducción" in her private studio with Nina Hagen as backing vocals. The cover was played in radio stations and in the BBC, but had little success. Eddie Simmons also travelled along with the band to Abbey Road Studios with two vinyls of "Nada Personal", to try to convince them to record the album in the studio. After this the band returned to Argentina and frontman Gustavo Cerati along with bassist Héctor "Zeta" Bosio made a short trip to New York City, where they attended concerts and bought new instruments.

Soda Stereo hadn't composed any songs for the album, and the songs were developed in the rehearsal room previous to the recording of the album, located in Dr. Rómulo Naón y Sucre avenue. Cerati recorded demos of ideas he had with a TASCAM 388 portastudio in his flat to then be finished in the rehearsal room.

== Recording and production ==
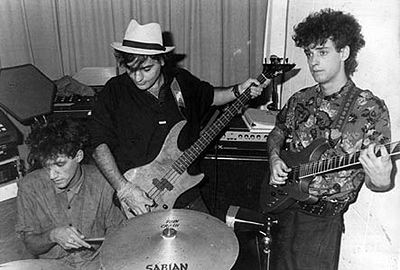
Soda Stereo recording Signos at Moebio Studios, recording lasted for only a month.

Even though Soda Stereo had the money to record the album outside of Argentina, they decided to record the album in the Moebio studios located in Buenos Aires. They felt pressured as they only had a month to record the album. The recording of the album started around mid-September 1986 and ended in mid-October. Not much detailed information is known about the recording of Signos, as Moebio Studios didn't preserve the recording sheets. One of the reasons that the band decided to record the album in the studio was due to audio engineer Mariano López and that Moebio provided 32 recording channels, while most studios from Buenos Aires at that time provided 16 or 24 channels. However, issues arose as those 32 channels were provided by two 16-channel Soundcraft consoles that had to be synchronised, which was a difficult process.

For the album, drummer Charly Alberti chose the cymbals Zildjian series Brilliant hi-hats and 14‘ Sabian crashes that were distinguished by a short, and sharp sound. For the 10’, 12‘ and 16’ Remo rototoms, he also chose sandblasted drumheads because he was looking for a ‘more tinny’ sound. In charge of the wind arrangements were Juan "Pollo" Raffo and Richard Coleman, and Vozarrón Pablo Rodríguez with the saxophone. While the keyboardist for Signos was Quintero, who made his last work with the band. Cerati was left in a vulnerable state after he had broken up with his fiancée, Noëlle Balfour, and felt affection for backing vocalist Celsa Mel Gowland, who had been called up to record in the sessions. However, this relationship between the two was short-lived.

The lyrics for Signos weren't finished, Cerati claimed that he wrote all the lyrics for the album in one night, but this untrue, as he only finished the lyrics he was working on in one night. Diego Giordano writes that this grew tension with Alberti and Bosio, causing discussions regarding the sharing of song royalties. Cerati argued that he composed the songs alone without the help of the rest and claimed that he should've owned the royalties.

== Composition ==
In England, we had been in direct contact with a lot of new music, at a time when the United Kingdom was once again the focus of what was happening in the world of music, and we wanted to capture that explosion in our next project.

— "Zeta" Bosio,

Soda Stereo's holiday in England made them incorporate the changes that were occurring in the English rock scene, and with Signos, they wanted a more acoustic and traditional sound, featuring instruments used in the 1970s like the Hammond organ and electric pianos. Which, according to Giordano, left behind the "technological obsession" of Nada Personal. Furthermore, Giordano, along with author Marcelo Fernández Bitar, writes that Soda Stereo wanted a more "classical" rock sound for the album. Quiero música en mi idioma wrote that the album has a tendency towards soul. Reviewer for AllMusic Iván Adaime said that the tracks are "coherent and consistent", and that it's their darkest and most enigmatic album. Contemporarily, Cerati described it as "some of our most authentic and where we invested the most effort". Soda Stereo had taken inspiration from the bands that they saw perform in the Glastonbury Festival, such as Lloyd Cole & the Commotions, the Cult, Level 42, and the Cure, along with the albums "Ocean Rain" by Echo & the Bunnymen and "The Unforgettable Fire" by U2, which were also big inspirations in the composition of the album. Juan Morris elaborates on this further, stating that, compared to Nada Personal, its lyrics were darker and had more emotion, which he believes are similar to the Cure and other post-punk groups. Some of the lyrics, like in Prófugos and in El Rito, were influenced by Cerati's relationship with Gowland. Signos started an evolution in Cerati as a writer and composer, which, to Eduardo Berti, made him one of the most interesting composers of the 1980s in Argentine rock.

== Promotional tour ==
Following its release, Soda Stereo toured extensively across Latin America, performing in Chile, Paraguay, Peru, and Colombia. Their appearance at the 1987 Viña del Mar International Song Festival cemented their status as a continental phenomenon. The Signos tour was also marked by tragedy. In the city of San Nicolás, during a performance in a nightclub, a balcony collapsed due to overcrowding, resulting in the death of five people. Cerati later described the incident as part of the "dark history of rock concerts" in Argentina, lamenting the lack of safety measures at the time. Out of respect for the victims, the band performed their following shows at Obras Sanitarias without stage design or lighting.

== Packaging ==
The covers of Signos are polaroid arts made by Caito Lorenzo with help from Alfredo Lois. Bosio met Lorenzo at the end of the 1970s in a photography course, years later Lorenzo called Bosio to express an interest in working with Soda Stereo. His first work for the band was the Nada Personal VHS. Meanwhile, Lois was in charge of the graphic art, the staging of the concerts, the direction of the band's music videos and designed the cover of the first two albums of the band. Lois maintained a friendship with Soda Stereo, with the first live performance of the band being in his birthday.

For the covers, the band wanted something abstract, Lois and the band members were already familiar with Lorenzo's work with polaroid art, where he mixed op art and pop art styles and used various experimental technics in his work. Lorenzo first experimented with polaroid arts after reading an interview in a French magazine with photographer David Hamilton.

Originally, Cerati wanted the album to be called Caja Negra (transl. Black box). His reasoning was that the people at time were "more painted up, more gritty, and everything dark, obscure, dead-end, no-future, annoys me a bit" and he didn't share that, making him to want to leave the "black box". In the end, he decided not to as he thought there was "too much [darkness]". Daffunchio had tried to convince the band to be designer of the cover by showing them his drawing folder in a meeting for the writing of Persiana Americana. After having a discussion, the band decided to not let him design the cover.

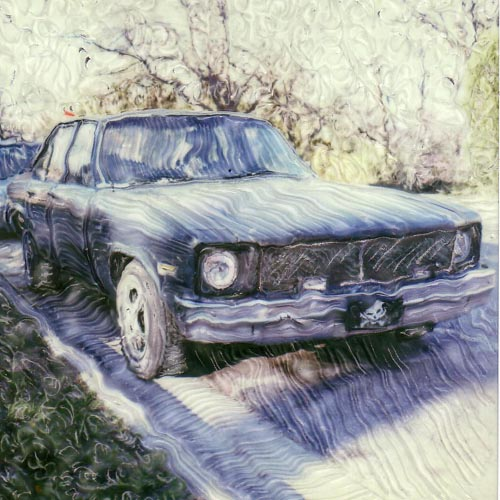
An example of polaroid art.

The front cover was the result of Lorenzo making a full exposure with warm light and a development process on which he placed fabrics between the surface of the Polaroid and the rollers, causing the chemicals to be unevenly distributed and the Polaroid to capture the fabric's texture. The back cover features more polaroid art, which each one representing a song from the album. These photos were made before front cover, and Cerati chose what pictures would represent each song in a meeting with Lorenzo and Lois. No Existes features the lyric "La Polaroid sobre la silla" (transl. "The Polaroid on the chair") which references this meeting. Moreover, the pictures of the back cover are featured across the inner cover in black and white and are paired with the lyrics of their respective tracks.

For the font shown across the packaging, Lois decided that it had to be done by hand with templates and Rotring fountain pens. Lorenzo and Lois made an alphabet, that they then photocopied it to cut them and make the letters into different sizes. Lois also changed the band's logo, which was placed in the top right corner of the front cover.

== Release and reception ==
=== Release ===
Signos' release date is unknown due to lack of documentation; it's estimated to have been released in November 1986. Nonetheless, Bitar has come out to claim that it was released on the 10th, while Giordano disagrees and writes that it was released on the 3rd. It was originally released in the LP and cassette formats by Columbia Records. Later, in March 1988 it was issued on the CD format, becoming —along with Parte de la religión by Charly García— one of the first Argentine albums to be released in the format. CDs of the album were fabricated in the Netherlands and distributed in Latin America. Bolivian records were issued in the EP format and only contained four songs: "Sin Sobresaltos", "No Existes", "Persiana Americana" and "Signos". Mexican records included text on the front cover reading "Incluye los exitos: "Persiana Americana", "Signos" y "Sin Sobresaltos"." (transl. "It includes the hits: “Persiana Americana”, “Signos” and “Sin Sobresaltos”."). For promotion, "Prófugos" was released as a single with "Signos" as the B side. "Persiana Americana" was released as the A side to "No Existes", and also released as the B side to "Sobredosis de TV", a song from the first album of the band. No music videos were recorded for any of the songs in Signos as they didn't have any time to do so.

=== Reception ===
==== Initial reception ====
With Signos, critics started taking Soda Stereo seriously. Pelo published its review of the album in January 1987, where they praised the more natural and soft sound featured in the album, describing it as shocking and a demonstration of quality. Rock & Pop's Gloria Guerrero agreed in its review, praising Cerati's poetic lyrics. She called the album a significant progress, pleasing both fans and those "who were once suspicious and distrustful of what was commercially easy". Pelo's writer elaborates further and writes that Cerati treats guitars with a "very special maestry" and that he sang at his "very best". Soda Stereo had influenced new groups, which Pelo mentioned, but with criticism writing that: "Unfortunately, their music has, in many cases, become a kind of model for those who seek a modern sound or simply want to live a success story". Bitar, while working for magazine Canta Rock, wrote in his review that Signos was the best album by the band and one of the best of recent years. He also noticed a growth in Bosio as a bassist and praised Gowland's vocals in El Rito and Quintero's playing in the title track. In 1986, surveys by both Pelo and Rock & Pop listed Soda Stereo as the best band, with the best album (Signos), the best song (Prófugos), and the best performance and best singer (Cerati).

Upon release, the album received a platinum certification in Argentina as 60,000 pre-orders were made before release. Which according to Columbia Records, was enough to cover the costs made during the making of the album. By 1987, it had sold 120,000 copies in Chile in the cassette format, 50,000 in the LP format, and had received two platinum certifications. Like Argentina and Chile, the album received a platinum certification in Perú, with 21,000 copies sold by 1987.

==== Retrospective reception ====
Professional ratings
Review scores
Source	Rating
AllMusic	5/5 stars
The Encyclopedia of Popular Music	4/5 stars

In retrospect, Giordano wrote that Signos started an evolution that ended with Canción Animal (1990), which to him, placed Soda Stereo at the top of the history of Rock en español. While authors Rubén Espejo and Eduardo Ortega write that it's one of the most important albums in the history of Rock en español. Their newspaper, La Tercera, ranked it fourteenth in its 2017 list of "The 20 Best Albums of Argentine Rock". AllMusic reviewer Adaime wrote in its 2001 review that the title track, Persiana Americana and Prófugos allowed Soda Stereo to explore wider audiences and new musical directions. Daffunchio, later said in an interview about Persiana Americana that "The people turned ‘Persiana [Americana]’ into a success that no one imagined, not even Gustavo [Cerati]". Rolling Stone's Oscar Jalil described Cerati's riffs in the album as one of his best as a guitarist. His magazine, Rolling Stone, ranked Signos 25th on its list of "The 100 Greatest Albums of Argentine Rock".

== Track listing ==
No.	Title	Translation	Length
1.	"Sin Sobresaltos"	Without Shocks	4:22
2.	"El Rito"	The Rite	6:06
3.	"Prófugos"	Fugitives	5:17
4.	"No Existes"	You Don’t Exist	4:44
5.	"Persiana Americana"	American Blinds	4:52
6.	"En Camino"	On the Way	4:30
7.	"Signos"	Signs	5:15
8.	"Final Caja Negra"	Final Black Box	5:44

== Chart performance ==
Chart (1986)	Peak position
Argentine Albums (CAPIF)	1

== Certifications ==
Region	Certification	Certified units/sales
Argentina (CAPIF) sales in 1987	Platinum	110,000
Chile sales in 1987	2× Platinum	
Mexico (AMPROFON)	Gold	100,000^{‡}
^{‡} Sales+streaming figures based on certification alone.

== Personnel ==
- Gustavo Cerati – vocals, guitars
- Zeta Bosio – bass, backing vocals
- Charly Alberti – drums, percussion

== Sources ==
=== Books ===
- Bosio, Héctor (1 May 2016). Yo conozco ese lugar [I know that place] (in Spanish) (eBook ed.). Grupo Planeta Spain. ISBN 978-950-49-5157-5.
- Bitar, Marcelo Fernández (2017) [1988]. Soda Stereo: La biografía total [Soda Stereo: The Full Biography] (in Spanish) (eBook ed.). Sudamericana. ISBN 978-9500757706.
- Morris, Juan (1 August 2015). Cerati: La Biografia (in Spanish). SUDAMERICANA. ISBN 978-950-07-5297-8 – via the Internet Archive.
- Giordano, Diego (2019). Uniendo fisuras (in Spanish). Ciudad Autónoma de Buenos Aires: Vademécum, La Edad de Oro. ISBN 978-987-45755-4-8.
- Bitar, Marcelo Fernández (1 November 2015). 50 años de rock en Argentina (in Spanish) (eBook ed.). SUDAMERICANA. ISBN 978-950-07-5429-3.
- Marchi, Sergio (1 May 2023). Algún tiempo atrás. La vida de Gustavo Cerati (in Spanish) (eBook ed.). SUDAMERICANA. ISBN 978-950-07-6892-4.
- Berti, Eduardo (2021) [1989]. Rockología: documentos de los 80 (in Spanish). Buenos Aires: Gourmet Musical Ediciones. ISBN 978-987-3823-56-5.
- Shepherd, John; Horn, David; Laing, Dave; Oliver, Paul; Wicke, Peter (2005). Continuum Encyclopedia of Popular Music of the World. London New York (NY): Continuum. ISBN 978-1-5013-2447-5.
- Bogdanov, Vladimir; Woodstra, Chris; Erlewine, Stephen Thomas (2001). All Music Guide. San Francisco: Hal Leonard Corporation. ISBN 978-0-87930-627-4 – via allmusic.com.

=== Magazines ===
- "Los 100 mejores discos del rock nacional". Rolling Stone Argentina (in Spanish). S.A. La Nación. 3 April 2007.
- Bitar, Marcelo Fernández (February 1987). "Soda Stereo, Signos". Canta Rock. No. 78. p. 36.
- "Diferentes signos" (PDF). January 1987. p. 32.

=== Articles ===
- "Exitos de la semana". El Tiempo. 14 March 1987. p. 34.
- Vuelven, pero en un DVD [They are back, but in a DVD] (in Spanish). La Opinión. 30 December 2004. p. 22.
