= Canción Animal =

1990 Soda Stereo studio album

Studio album by Soda Stereo
- Released: 7 August 1990
- Recorded: June–July 1990
- Studios: Criteria (Miami, Florida)
- Genres: Alternative rock, hard rock
- Length: 41:18
- Labels: Sony; Columbia
- Producer: Carlos Alomar

Soda Stereo chronology
Languis (1989)	Canción Animal (1990)	Rex Mix (1991)

Singles from Canción Animal
- 1. "De Música Ligera / Té para 3" Released: 1990; 2. "Un Millón de Años Luz / Hombre al Agua" Released: 1990; 3. "(En) El Séptimo Día" Released: 1990

Canción Animal (pronounced [kanˈsjon aniˈmal]; transl. Animal Song) is the fifth studio album by the Argentine rock band Soda Stereo. Released on 7 August 1990, the album features a rock sound, a change from the band's previous new wave and funk albums.

To create Canción Animal, the band drew inspiration primarily from the sound of Argentine rock bands from the 1970s that they had listened to during their adolescence, such as Pescado Rabioso, Vox Dei, and Color Humano. Apart from the alternative and hard rock from the album, Canción Animal features country, folk, psychedelic, and acoustic songs.

The album was recorded in Criteria Studios in Miami between June and July 1990. The demos of the album were recorded by Soda Stereo in Gustavo Cerati's flat in Buenos Aires, and the album featured the help of singer Daniel Melero, who collaborated in the writing of the tracks in the album with Cerati. Melero wrote the track "Canción Animal" as a request by Cerati to describe his relationship with his girlfriend Paola Antonucci. Other guests were present, like Tweety Gonzalez, who played the keyboard in songs like "Un Millón de Años Luz" (lit. 'A Million Light Years'), and the acoustic guitar in "Hombre al Agua" (lit. 'Man Overboard'). The sound engineers were Mariano López and Adrian Taverna.

In 2006, Canción Animal ranked second on Al Borde's list of the 250 best Ibero-American rock albums, and it ranked ninth on Rolling Stone Argentina's list of "The 100 Greatest Albums of National Rock" in 2007. The album sold in total 500,000 copies in Argentina. In 2024, it was ranked 21st on the "Los 600 de Latinoamérica" list compiled by music journalists several from countries of the Americas, curating the top 600 Latin American albums from 1920 to 2022.

== Background ==
After the recording of Doble Vida in 1988, Soda Stereo went on a tour throughout the Americas with 25 shows in 40 days. After coming to Argentina, they received two Plate Discs from CBS Records International after reaching 140,000 copies sold on the album Signos (1986) in 6 months and Ruido Blanco (1987) in 2 months. In the later half of the year, the band went on another tour, but this time throughout Argentina, promoting their new album, the tour lasted 61 days with 25 shows and a total of 250 thousand spectators. Soda Stereo had just separated from their long-time manager Alberto Ohanian and formed their own agency around that time. In late 1989, Soda Stereo went on a tour throughout North America and Central America, to promote the extended play Languis, with it ending in Argentina, in one of rehearsal sessions in Mexico, the first version of "De Música Ligera" would be made after an improvisation in the sound test by Gustavo Cerati, the final two shows in North America were made in the US in the Hollywood Palace nightclub, where after returning from the second show to their hotel, they realised that they have been robbed. Cerati met Paola Antonucc in 1989, a 19-year old fine arts student and Alberti's girlfriend at the start of the year, who would become his partner and have a great influence on the songs in Canción Animal.

== Recording and production ==
Cerati was already starting to develop demos for the album in his new flat located in Avenida Figueroa Alcorta, Buenos Aires, recording the demos TASCAM 388 portastudio and an Akai MPC, bassist Zeta Bosio had regularly come to Cerati's flat to try and develop new ideas, Bosio and Cerati wanted to give the band a new sound, replacing the groove and funk from Doble Vida with a rock sound. This sound was inspired by 70's Argentine rock bands like: Pescado Rabioso, Color Humano y Vox Dei. Charly Alberti was also invited to these sessions to add the drums to the demo. However, author Sergio Marchi contradicts this and writes that Bosio and Alberti weren't on Cerati's creative process and that Alberti was distancing himself from him musically after the last tour. Adrian Taverna, the second sound engineer during the recording and production of the album, backs this up and states that the only time Bosio came to the recording sessions was when he had to play the Chapman Stick in the title-track.

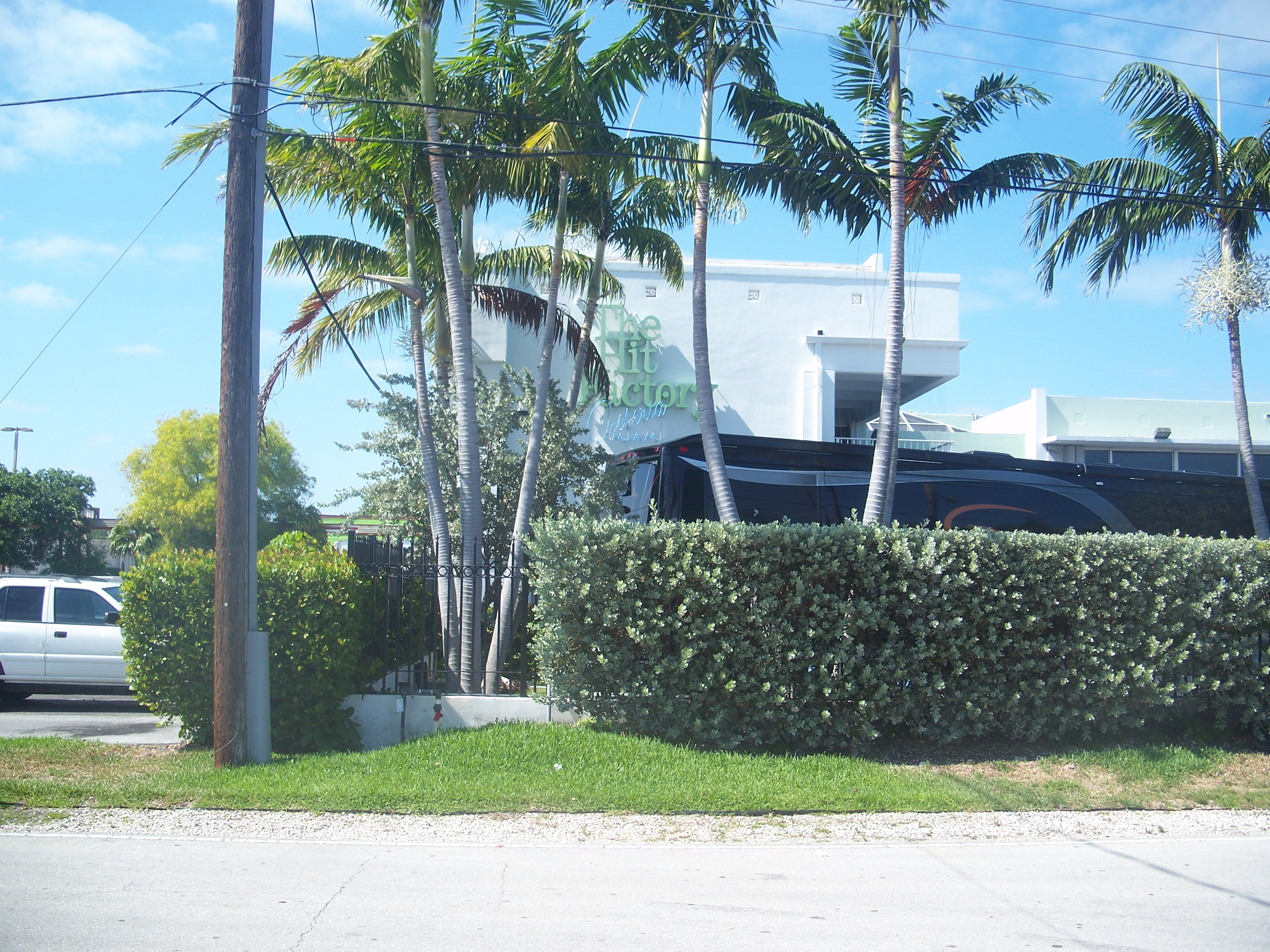
Criteria Studios in 2011

Soda Stereo flew to the Criteria Studios in Miami, Florida on 9 June 1990 with the ten demos of the songs in the album, the band rented a flat to live near Route 95. In order to record in the Criteria Studios, Cerati had to convince CBS as they didn't want to pay for the costs. The chosen producer was Carlos Alomar, a guitarist who had previously worked with David Bowie and Mick Jagger. Furthermore, Mariano López would be the main sound engineer with Taverna as the second sound engineer. Daniel Melero, "Tweety" González, Andrea Álvarez and Pedro Aznar were also involved in the production, Aznar collaborated in the vocal arrangements, however Aznar couldn't travel to Miami due to a budget cut by CBS and stayed in Buenos Aires, because of this he had to send his arrangements to Miami, Melero collaborated the songwriting and composition, and the rest had a minor collaboration in the production of the album. The guitars were recorded by Taverna with a VOX AC-50 guitar amplifier with Marshall baffles, as the VOX AC-50 did not have baffles. Three guitars were used in total, with little overdubs but a lot of doubling according to Cerati. Recording and production ended in July 1990.

== Composition ==
I see the album as an evolution towards simplicity, as an arrogantly dangerous step. I feel something instinctive, animalistic and primitive in these songs, but conscientiously primitive.

— Gustavo Cerati,

Canción Animal changed the sound of the band: Journalist Carlos Prat of Todo Noticias writes that it permitted the band to show a direct and crude side, while AllMusic reviewer Iván Adaime writes that Canción Animal features an "elegant fury". MusicHound described it as an Alternative rock album mixed with pop-psychedelica. Furthermore, Marcelo Rey of La Opinión compared the sound of the album to the likes of Jimi Hendrix, Led Zeppelin and the Doors. Tom Hull also found similarities between other bands like Guns 'N Roses and the Manic Street Preachers. Music critics have noticed that lyrics Canción Animal are romantic and sexual.

=== Side A ===
"(En) El Séptimo Día"
The opening track on the album showcases Cerati's personality in a way: a person who, until the very end, was always on the move. That's why he starts off as a hater and exclaims, “Odio este domingo híbrido de siempre [I hate this typical hybrid Sunday]."
—MariskalRock, 2020,

The opening track of the album, "(En) el Séptimo Día" (lit. '(On) the Seventh Day'), starts with a riff driven by Charly Alberti's syncopated drumming and Zeta Bosio's pumping bass; journalist Ariel Olvero writes that the track ilustrates Canción Animal's aggressive sound. The song is played in a 7/8 time signature, an irregular time signature more commonly found in progressive rock.The second track, "Un Millón de Años Luz" (lit. 'A Million Light Years'), was based around the bass line of the song "Tempted" by Squeeze, It had a pumping base, to which Cerati added a mix of guitar chords with an accordion-like sound with a keyboard played by "Tweety" Gonzalez and lyrics that spoke of a cosmic love inspired by his fights and reconciliations with Paola Antonucci. The title track and third track, "Canción Animal", was composed by Cerati; however, the lyrics were written by Daniel Melero in a request by Cerati to make a song that would describe his relationship with his girlfriend, Paola Antonucci. For the writing, Melero took various lyrics from a song he had written called "Fragancia" (lit. 'Fragrance') and was inspired by a monologue that he saw on a pornographic film called "Café Flesh". The fourth track, "1990", differs from the other songs in the album, containing a sound influenced by the '60s and '70s with likes of Led Zeppelin and the Beatles. According to MariskalRock.com, the sound on the track is mix of country music and folk music. Pedro Aznar participated as a special guest and arranged the vocals, the backing vocals are shared between Daniel Melero, percussionist Andrea Álvarez, and Cerati. The fifth track, "Sueles Dejarme Solo" (lit. 'You Tend to Leave Me Alone'), has a "grunge like sound" according to MariskalRock.com. The song revolves around three main guitar chords, E, C and D, which give it an "aggressive energy" according to MariskalRock.com, with also Charly Alberti playing the drums in a stronger and more forceful way. It ends abruptly; Marchi finds a similarity between the ending "I Want You (She's So Heavy)" by the Beatles and the track, due to both being the closure of their respective album's side and having an abrupt end.

=== Side B ===
The opening track of Side B, "De Música Ligera" (lit. 'Of Lightweight Music'), uses only four guitar chords: B minor, G, D and A, and features cryptic lyrics of just eight verses. The title of the song comes from a vinyl box called Clásicos ligeros de todos los tiempos, owned by Cerati's parents. Two different versions were recorded based on the sound test made in Mexico; one was the final one and another was the one played in Soda Stereo's last concert in 1997. Cerati deemed the song too simplistic and wanted to leave out of the album. The seventh track, "Hombre al Agua" (lit. 'Man Overboard'), has its lyrics talk about both sailing and leaving a relationship behind. It features a basic drum beat that accompanies a keyboard played by Daniel Melero, the guitars played by Cerati and "Tweety" Gonzalez (acoustic), and a catchy bass line and rock solo played by Cerati. The eighth track, "Entre Canibales" (lit. 'Between Cannibals'), was described as a "neo-psychedelic sound mixed with an alternative rock sound" by journalist Ariel Olivero. The track starts with acoustic guitar strokes, chords and drums. The song is starts being played in A minor but later changes to G minor. The ninth track, "Té para 3" (lit. 'Tea for 3'), was written by Gustavo Cerati as a song dedicated to dying father, Juan José Cerati, who had been diagnosed with lung cancer. The title comes from Gustavo Cerati's visits to his father's house along with his mother, to drink tea with him in the afternoons. The song is played in 3/4 time signature. The lyric, Te vi que llorabas, te vi que llorabas. Por él (I saw you crying, I saw you crying. For him.) is written by Gustavo Cerati in his sadness of seeing his mother cry for his father. Juan José Cerati would end up dying on 3 January 1992. The final track of Canción Animal, "Cae el Sol" (lit. 'The Sun Sets'), composed by Cerati and Daniel Melero.

== Packaging ==
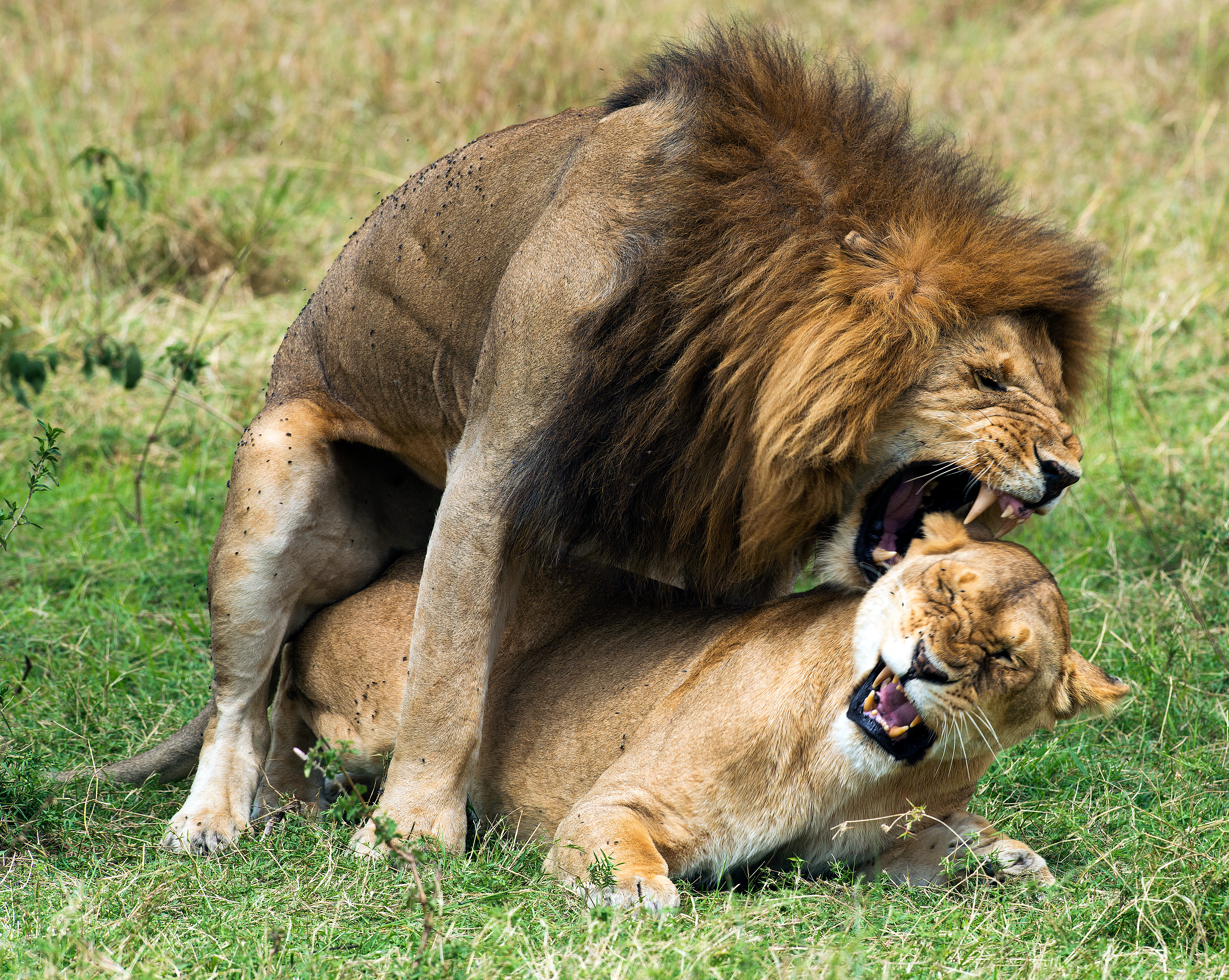
The album cover features two lions copulating

The name of the album was originally titled Tensión e integridad (transl. Tension and Integrity), ⁣but Cerati came up with the name Canción Animal minutes before boarding the plane to Miami. The album cover was made by Cerati and his girlfriend Paola Antonucci on an orange poster board, featuring a weather vane bought in Venice Beach, a tensegrid made out wooden sticks and a photo of two lions copulating taken from the Enciclopedia del Mundo Animal. The original concept was made by Alfredo Lois, however, Cerati and Daniel Melero rejected it.

== Release and promotion ==
The album was released on 7 August 1990 in the U.S and Mexico. It was accompanied by "De Música Ligera" released as promotional single, with releases in the US having "Té para 3" as the B side. The single received gold certifications in Mexico and Spain and got a music video, recorded on September 1990 in the studio Del Picadero and was directed by Alfredo Lois. For the recording, Soda Stereo playbacked in a blue screen room to then project images into the footage with a chroma key. Also released as singles in Argentina were "(En) el Séptimo Día" and "Un Millón de Años Luz" with "Hombre al Agua" as the B side.

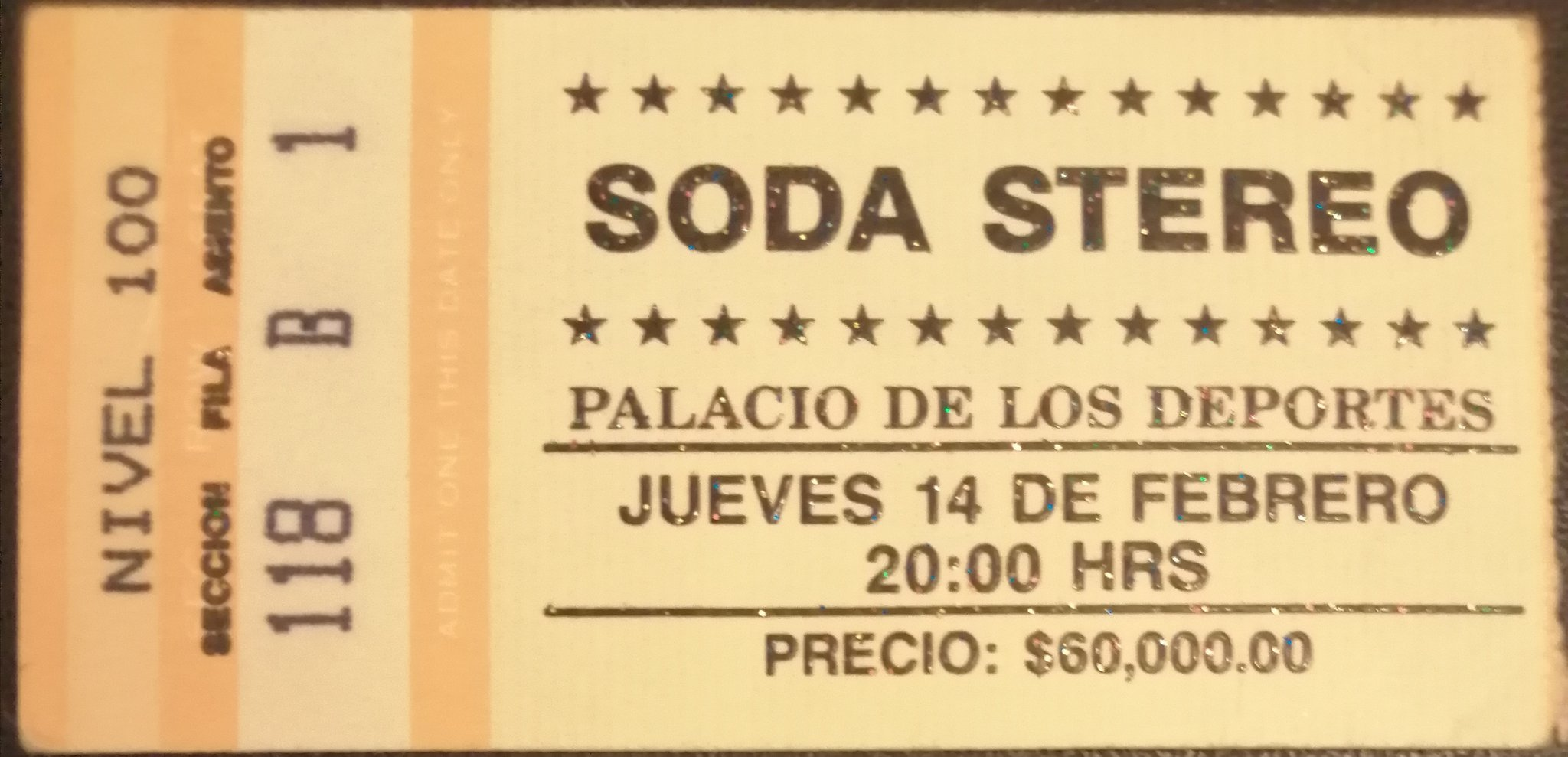
Ticket for a show in Mexico

In 26 October 1990 the Gira Animal (lit. 'Animal Tour') was started in the city of Santa Fe, Argentina and continued across Argentina, except for one show that was played in Paraguay. 30 shows where played in Argentina in total, the biggest tour since 1980 when Almendra performed 34 shows. In 1991, the tour expanded internationally with shows being played throughout the Americas, starting with Uruguay in Punta del Este, as well as dates in Spain. A free show was organized in December of that year on the Avenida 9 de Julio, Buenos Aires, with an attendance of 250 thousand people stretched out along 20 nearby streets. This show was televised by El Trece and organized by the city government as a part of the program "Mi Buenos Aires Querido". The tour closed off in 1992 with the last show being played in the city of Mar del Plata. Some shows where recorded for a live album Rex Mix released in September 1991.

== Reception ==
Professional ratings
Review scores
Source	Rating
AllMusic	5/5 stars
MusicHound	5/5 stars
The Encyclopedia of Popular Music	4/5 stars
Tom Hull	B+

Canción Animal received praise from music critics for its "intense and crude" sound. Several reviewers considered the song "De Música Ligera" an anthem of latin rock and rock en español, with the track being ranked number one as the best song of Ibero-American rock by magazine Al Borde in 2006. It was also Soda Stereo's most listened song on Spotify with more than 302 million streams as of 2024. Rolling Stone Argentina journalist Juan Morris wrote that Canción Animal became the landmark for an entire generation of Latin-American artists. Al Borde ranked Canción Animal number two on its list of 250 best Ibero-American rock albums in 2006, while Rolling Stone Argentina ranked it ninth on its list of "The 100 Greatest Albums of National Rock" a year later. In 2024, it was ranked 21st on the "Los 600 de Latinoamérica" list compiled by music journalists from several countries of the Americas, curating the top 600 Latin American albums from 1920 to 2022. Chilean newspaper La Tercera ranked it fourth in its 2017 list of "The 20 Best Albums of Argentine Rock".

Canción Animal sold around 500,000 copies in Argentina. In 1991, Canción Animal was one of the three most sold discs in Venezuela.

== Track listing ==
All tracks are written by Gustavo Cerati, except where noted

Side A
No.	Title	Writer(s)	Length
1.	"(En) el Séptimo Día" ((On) The Seventh Day)		4:25
2.	"Un Millón de Años Luz" (A Million Light Years)		5:05
3.	"Canción Animal" (Animal Song)	Cerati, Melero	4:09
4.	"1990"		3:40
5.	"Sueles Dejarme Solo" (You Tend To Leave Me Alone)		3:48
Total length:			20:27

Side B
No.	Title	Writer(s)	Length
1.	"De Música Ligera" (Of Easy Listening Music, lit. Of Light Music)	Cerati, Zeta Bosio	3:33
2.	"Hombre al Agua" (Man Overboard)		5:55
3.	"Entre Caníbales" (Among Cannibals)		4:09
4.	"Té Para 3" (Tea for Three)		2:27
5.	"Cae el Sol" (The Sun Sets)	Cerati, Melero	4:22
Total length:			19:46

== Personnel ==
Soda Stereo

- Gustavo Cerati – lead vocals, guitars
- Zeta Bosio – bass guitar, backing vocals, Chapman Stick on "Canción Animal"
- Charly Alberti – drums, percussion

Additional personnel

All credited in the inside of the packaging of the album on vinyl.

- Alfredo Lois – art direction
- Mariano Lopez – engineer / mixing
- Pedro Aznar – vocal arrangement
- Daniel Melero – keyboards and arrangements
- Tweety González – keyboards
- Andrea Álvarez – percussion
- Peter Baleani – production coordination
- Roger Hughes – assistant engineer
- Vanessa Eckstem – assistant
- Adrian Taverna – band assistant and engineer
- Caito Lorenzo & Alfredo Lois – photography

== Chart performance ==
Chart (1990)	Peak position
Argentine Albums (CAPIF)	1

Chart (2025)	Peak position
Argentine Albums (CAPIF)	1

== Certifications ==
Region	Certification	Certified units/sales
Mexico (AMPROFON)	Gold	100,000^{‡}
^{‡} Sales+streaming figures based on certification alone.

== Sources ==
=== Books ===
- Fernández Bitar, Marcelo (2017). Soda Stereo: La biografía total [Soda Stereo: The Full Biography]. Sudamericana. ISBN 978-9500757706.
- Bosio, Zeta (1 May 2016). Yo conozco ese lugar [I know that place] (in Spanish). Grupo Planeta Spain. ISBN 978-950-49-5157-5.
- Morris, Juan (1 August 2015). Cerati (in Spanish). SUDAMERICANA. ISBN 978-950-07-5297-8.
- Blanc, Enrique (22 February 2024). Qué pasa por la calle (in Spanish). Editorial Universidad de Guadalajara. ISBN 607-581-162-1.
- Marchi, Sergio (1 May 2023). Algún tiempo atrás. La vida de Gustavo Cerati (in Spanish). SUDAMERICANA. ISBN 950-07-6892-5.

==== Music Reviews ====
- Graff, Gary (1996). MusicHound Rock. Gale Cengage. ISBN 0-7876-1037-2.
- Shepherd, John; Horn, David; Laing, Dave; Oliver, Paul; Wicke, Peter (2005). Continuum Encyclopedia of Popular Music of the World. London New York (NY): Continuum. ISBN 978-1-5013-2447-5.

=== Articles ===
- "250 mejores albums del Rock Iberoamericano" [250 best albums of Ibero-American rock] (in Spanish). 25 December 2010. Archived from the original on 2 January 2011.
- "Los 100 mejores discos del rock nacional" [The 100 Greatest Albums of National Rock]. Rolling Stone Argentina (in Spanish). Publirevistas S. A. April 2007.
- Arroyo, Gonzalo (9 August 2020). "A 30 años de 'Canción animal': la historia detrás del disco fundamental de Soda Stereo" [30 years after ‘Canción animal’: the story behind Soda Stereo's landmark album]. MDZ Online (in Spanish).
- Figueroa, Felipe (11 July 2024). "'Canción animal' Soda Stereo". Los 600 de Latinoamérica (in Spanish).
- Artigas, Martín (15 September 2018). "Doble Vida, el conflictivo disco que marcó el destino de Soda Stereo, cumple 30 años" [Doble Vida, the controversial album that sealed Soda Stereo's fate, turns 30]. LA NACIÓN (in Spanish).
- "Soda Stereo, 25 años de Canción Animal: Separarse de la especie" [Soda Stereo, 25 años de Canción Animal: Separarse de la especie]. rollingstone.com.co (in Spanish). 4 September 2017. Archived from the original on 8 June 2021.
- Prat, Carlos Iogna (5 August 2020). "'Canción Animal' de Soda Stereo cumple 30 años: la pasión hecha canción al calor de las masas" [Soda Stereo's ‘Canción Animal’ turns 30: passion turned into song in the heat of the masses]. Todo Noticias (in Spanish).
- Prat, Carlos Iogna (6 August 2020). "Zeta Bosio: 'Se nos dio la posibilidad y la supimos aprovechar'" [Zeta Bosio: ‘We were given the opportunity and we took advantage of it.’]. Todo Noticias (in Spanish).
- Loreiro, Gabriela (11 August 2020). "Canción Animal fue como un golpe de nocaut" [Canción Animal was like a knockout blow]. Primera Edición (in Spanish).
- Kleiman, Claudio; Curto, Daniel (1990). "Gustavo Cerati analiza 'Canción Animal'" [Gustavo Cerati analyses ‘Canción Animal’]. El Musiquero.
- Suárez, Marlem (22 April 2024). "La historia de 'De música ligera', canción emblemática de Soda Stereo que nació en México" [The story behind 'De música ligera', Soda Stereo's iconic song that originated in Mexico]. infobae (in Spanish).
- Adaime, Iván (1995). "Canción Animal". AllMusic.
- "Soda Stereo: a 30 años de 'Canción Animal', uno de los discos más importantes del rock en español" [Soda Stereo: 30 years after ‘Canción Animal’, one of the most important albums in Spanish rock]. MariskalRock.com (in Spanish). 7 August 2020.
- Olivero, Ariel (7 August 2020). "Canción animal: 30 años del disco más rockero de Soda Stereo" [Canción animal: 30 years of Soda Stereo's most rock-oriented album]. La Izquierda Diario - Red internacional (in Spanish).
- "Soda rumbo a Miami" [Soda [Stereo] on its way to Miami] (PDF). June 1990.
- "Pedro Aznar" (PDF). September 1990.
- Canción Animal (Media notes). 1990.
- "35 años atrás SODA STEREO lanzaba 'Canción Animal', uno de los discos más emblemáticos del rock nacional" [35 years ago, SODA STEREO released ‘Canción Animal’, one of the most iconic albums in Argentine rock history]. Ámbito Financiero (in Spanish). 7 August 2025.
- "La historia no contada de 'Canción animal'" [The untold story of ‘Canción animal’]. LA NACIÓN (in Spanish). 31 July 2015.
- Berti, Eduardo (17 October 1990). "Soda Stereo prepara una gira animal" [Soda Stereo prepares the Gira Animal]. Página 12. p. 19.
- Prat, Carlos Iogna (7 August 2025). "'Fragancia', la canción de Daniel Melero que inspiró 'Canción Animal' de Soda Stereo". Todo Noticias (in Spanish).
- Larocca, Bruno (7 August 2020). "30 años de 'Canción animal': imágenes inéditas de la grabación del clip de 'De música ligera'". LA NACION (in Spanish).
- "Soda Stereo: rock animal" [Soda Stereo: animal rock]. El Tiempo. 16 November 1990. p. 12.
- Rey, Marcelo (28 October 1990). "En su nuevo disco 'Soda Stereo' reactualiza los sonidos originales del rock and roll" [In their new album, Soda Stereo revives the original sounds of rock and roll]. p. 67.
