= Soda Stereo =

Argentine rock band

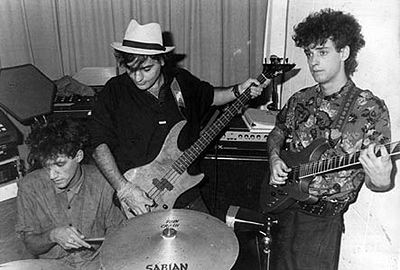
- Soda Stereo in 1986. From left: Charly Alberti, Zeta Bosio and Gustavo Cerati

Background information
- Also known as: Soda
- Origin: Buenos Aires, Argentina
- Genres: Argentine rock; new wave; post-punk; alternative rock; neo-psychedelia
- Years active: 1982–1997; 2007; 2020–2022; 2026
- Labels: Sony Music, Sony BMG, Columbia
- Members: Zeta Bosio; Charly Alberti
- Past members: Gustavo Cerati; Richard Coleman
- Website: sodastereo.com

Soda Stereo was an Argentine rock band formed in Buenos Aires in 1982. The band's membership consisted of singer-guitarist Gustavo Cerati, bassist Zeta Bosio and drummer Charly Alberti. During their career, the band released seven studio albums before disbanding in 1997. Soda Stereo is the best-selling Argentine band of all time, having sold seven million records by 2007.

The band's 1984 self-titled debut album featured a new wave and ska influenced sound, which evolved into a post-punk style found on their subsequent albums Nada personal (1985), Signos (1986), and Doble Vida (1988). The band's 1990 album Canción Animal featured the alternative rock anthem "De Música Ligera", their best-known song in Latin America. On their last two albums, Dynamo (1992) and Sueño Stereo (1995), their sound evolved to incorporate genres such as shoegaze and art rock. Their farewell concert on 20 September 1997 at the Estadio Monumental in Buenos Aires was released later that year on the live albums El Último Concierto A and B.

All three members remained musically active following the band's split, with Cerati embarking a solo career. Soda Stereo reunited for the Me Verás Volver concert tour in 2007 and played their final concert on 21 December 2007. Cerati suffered a stroke after performing a solo show in Caracas, Venezuela, on 15 May 2010. He was hospitalized in Buenos Aires, Argentina, and fell into a coma for 4 years. He died on 4 September 2014 from respiratory arrest. Bosio and Alberti reunited Soda Stereo in 2020 for the Gracias Totales tour, which featured several guest singers including Cerati's son Benito and Coldplay frontman Chris Martin, before going into hiatus in 2022. In 2025 the band announced Ecos, a 2026 tour featuring a digital Cerati playing along on stage.

== History ==
=== Formation and early years (1982–1984) ===
In the summer of 1981, Gustavo Cerati and Hector Zeta Bosio, then 22 and 23 respectively, met at Punta del Este, Uruguay, both studying majors and both part of rock bands, Cerati with his group Sauvage and Bosio with the Morgan. Cerati and Bosio, each drawn by the other's musical tastes, established a friendship and a musical bond that encouraged them to start playing together. Cerati first joined Bosio's group The Morgan, then formed Stress with Charly Amato and drummer Pablo Guadalupe, also working on the project Erekto with bandmate Andres Calamaro. Neither project met Cerati's expectations, however, and both fell through.

Meanwhile, Cerati's sister, Maria Laura Cerati, got asked out by Carlos Ficicchia, a man she had met in River Plate, Argentina, who called repeatedly, all advances which she rejected. On one occasion, when Cerati answered the phone for his sister, he befriended Ficicchia, who mentioned that he was a drummer, and the son of famous Argentine jazz drummer and songwriter Tito Alberti. Interested in his talents after hearing him play, Cerati and Bosio would ask him to join the band–if he would cut his hair. During this time Ficicchia adopted the stage name "Charly Alberti".

The band, after experimenting with multiple names, eventually settled on Los Estereotipos, which referenced a song by the Specials which they enjoyed listening to. The band recorded a demo under this name, with Richard Coleman on backing guitar, a short-lived member of the band who was recruited to "beef up" the guitar sound. The songs recorded would include "Porque No Puedo Ser Del Jet Set?", which became a hit single for the band on their debut studio album. Other songs recorded included "Dime Sebastian" and "Debo Soñar" by Ulises Butrón, in which Ulises Butrón played guitars and Daniel Melero played keyboards; Melero, a growing figurehead of Argentina's electronic rock scene, would become an instrumental influence on the band's sound in its final years.

The trio, regretting using cliches in their band name (claiming that "Los" (The) in a rock-band name was overused), often brainstormed random words and wrote them down, a university pastime for Cerati and Bosio–eventually coming up with Soda Stereo, thanks in part to Cerati's excessive soda consumption during band rehearsals.

The first show under Soda's new name occurred in December 1982, at Alfredo Lois's birthday party. Lois, who was Cerati and Bosio's university classmate, would go on to become Soda's video director as well as their visual and stylistic guru; he was later recognised by Cerati himself as "the fourth Soda member". Shortly after this first show, Richard Coleman, fourth member, left the band on good terms, recognizing that the band sounded better without him.

In July 1983 the trio made their debut at the Discothèque Airport in the neighborhood Belgrano neighborhood of Buenos Aires. The band reminisced on this show:

Our debut was at a fashion show at the "Disco Airport" (Discothèque), which was close to where we practiced in Buenos Aires. Nobody gave us so much as a nod. The three of us played on a very deficient sound system. But we were happy, even though no one paid attention. We really looked like a punk group, we didn't know how to play and the sound was loud, even though it was just that.

Following that gig, Soda Stereo slowly gained traction throughout the underground rock scene of Buenos Aires, making a name for themselves alongside other emerging bands at the time, such as Sumo, Los Twist, Los Encargados (with Daniel Melero), and other bands. Soda would take up residency at the traditional and deteriorated Cabaret Marabú club at Maipú 359. At these early shows, Soda would play songs like "Héroes de la Serie", "La Vi Parada Allí", and "Vamos a La Playa", along with other songs that appeared on their second demo.

Throughout 1983, the band would become notorious for their sound. Beginning at a pub show for a no-show band, Soda performed constantly; at their third show, Horacio Martinez, a historic Argentine rock producer and "talent hunter", heard them and invited them to record for CBS Records. This came to fruition in 1984 when Soda signed to the Rodríguez Ares agency.

=== First album and Chateau Rock '85 (1984–1985) ===
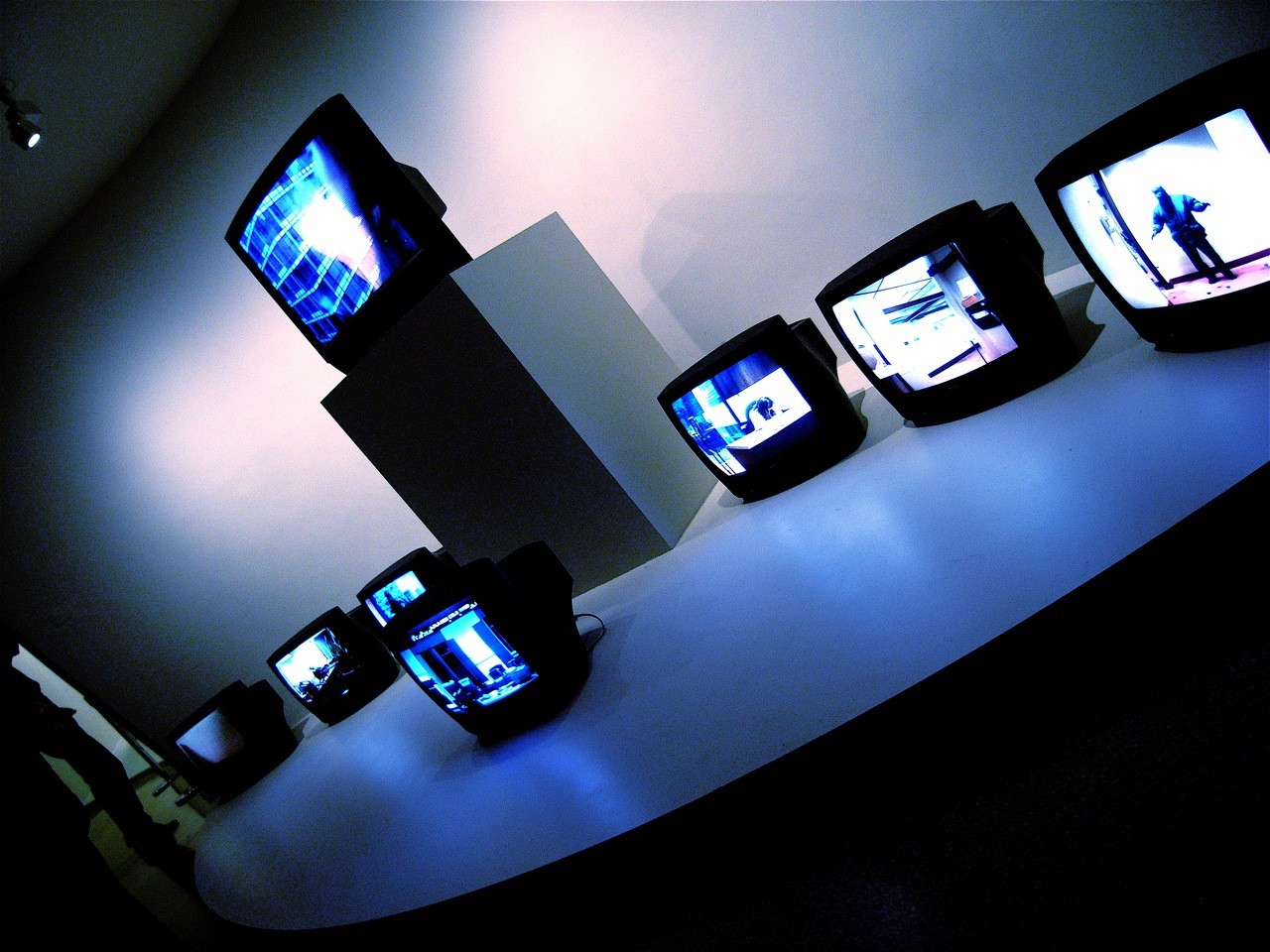
"Sobredosis de TV" was chosen as the first single for the first Soda Stereo album Soda Stereo, released on 14 December 1984. The video-clip for "Dietético" aired on Música Total on Canal 9 and had a considerable impact.

Soda Stereo recorded their debut during the second half of 1984. The album was produced by Federico Moura, the vocalist for Virus. By that time, Moura and Cerati had developed a fruitful artistic relationship. The recording took place in the defunct studios of CBS Records on Paraguay street. The end result was a cooler sound than from the live shows, which the bands were pleased with. The trio was aided by Daniel Melero on keys and Gonzo Palacios on sax. Both were listed as "guest musicians", a practice which would become common for Soda throughout their career. Such guest musicians would be recognized by the public as the "fourth Sodas".

The attention garnered by Soda enabled them to play at larger and larger venues. First was "La Esquina Del Sol" in Palermo. Their show at "El Recital De Los Lagos" on 1 and 2 December was their first to headline along with top Argentine acts. The show was hosted by Argentine television personality Juan Alberto Badía.

Soda Stereo presented their debut album at El Teatro Astros on 14 December 1984, their first show at the venue. The TVs there were turned on and out of sync with each other to the theme of "Sobredosis de TV" (TV Overdose), creating a captivating visual effect.

On 26 January 1985, Soda played the Rock in Bali festival in Argentine port city of Mar del Plata. On 17 March, they played the Festival Chateau Rock '85 at the Estadio Olímpico Chateau Carreras in front of a claimed audience of fifteen thousand. However, Córdoba media outlets claim that, "only half the number of people actually showed up" and that Soda were "hardly noticed because their first record had was just released a few months earlier." They also added "Raul Porchetto was the biggest draw of the night". Regardless, their presence at Chateau sparked a personal relationship between the band and the youth of Córdoba, it marked the moment that the band began to move toward national stardom.

The success of the band began at a very peculiar time, related to the return of democracy to Argentina (10 December 1983), but also to increasing notions of postmodernism, particularly in the way the 1980s youth found their role in a newly democratic society that had just emerged from bloody dictatorship and war.

Years later, Zeta Bosio would reflect on this juncture:

The democracy produced the adrenaline of something new, something was occurring, I knew I was going to make changes without knowing how. There was more air for us to make things and to wander, and we were a band of kids that wanted to make trouble. Our attention was on punk and on trying to show that there was something else that was more direct

On 13 October of that year, Soda played in front of a large audience in Buenos Aires as part of the third night of the Festival of Rock and Pop Held at the José Amalfitani Stadium home of the soccer club Velez Sarsfield . They shared the stage with INXS, Nina Hagen, Charly García, Virus, and Sumo, among others. By then Fabian "Vön" Quintero and Gonzo Palacios were "stable guests".

=== Nada personal and Obras (1985–1986) ===
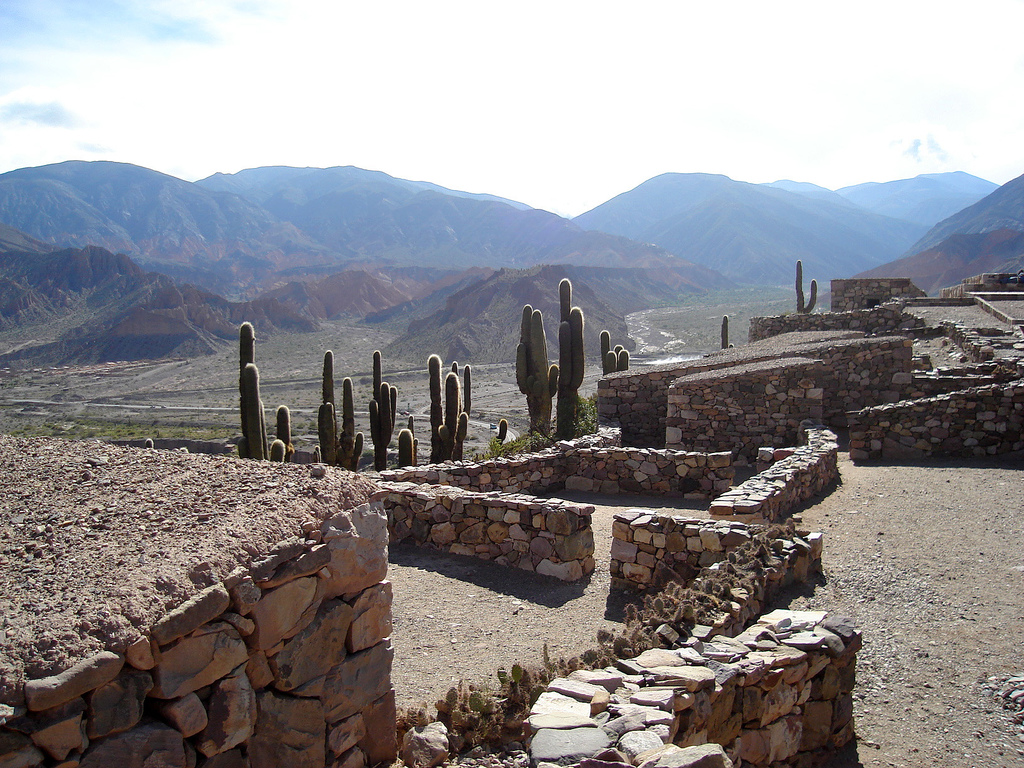
The Video for Cuando pase el temblor (1986), directed by Alfredo Lois was filmed at the -pre-Incan ruins of Pucará de Tilcara, in Jujuy. Soda fused rock and carnavalito (traditional Andean music). The video was nominated as the finalist for the 12th World Festival of Video and TV in Acapulco

Soda's second album Nada personal was edited in October 1985. During the summer the group toured Argentina, playing in Mar de Plata, Villa Gesell, and Pinamar, and ending the tour at the Festival De la Falda in Córdoba, which featured Andres Calamaro and Charly García on keyboards on "Jet Set".

In April the band decided to present the album at a concert at the Estadio Obras Sanitarias in Buenos Aires. There they did four shows with a total attendance of 20,000 spectators. Footage from the first show was edited into a long play video. After these concerts records sales began to accelerate, quickly passing the gold certification that they achieved during the summer, platinum certification, and finally double platinum in the following months. Without abandoning the danceable rhythms, the second LP resulted in more depth in the lyrics and a melodic maturity.

=== Latin American success (1986–1989) ===
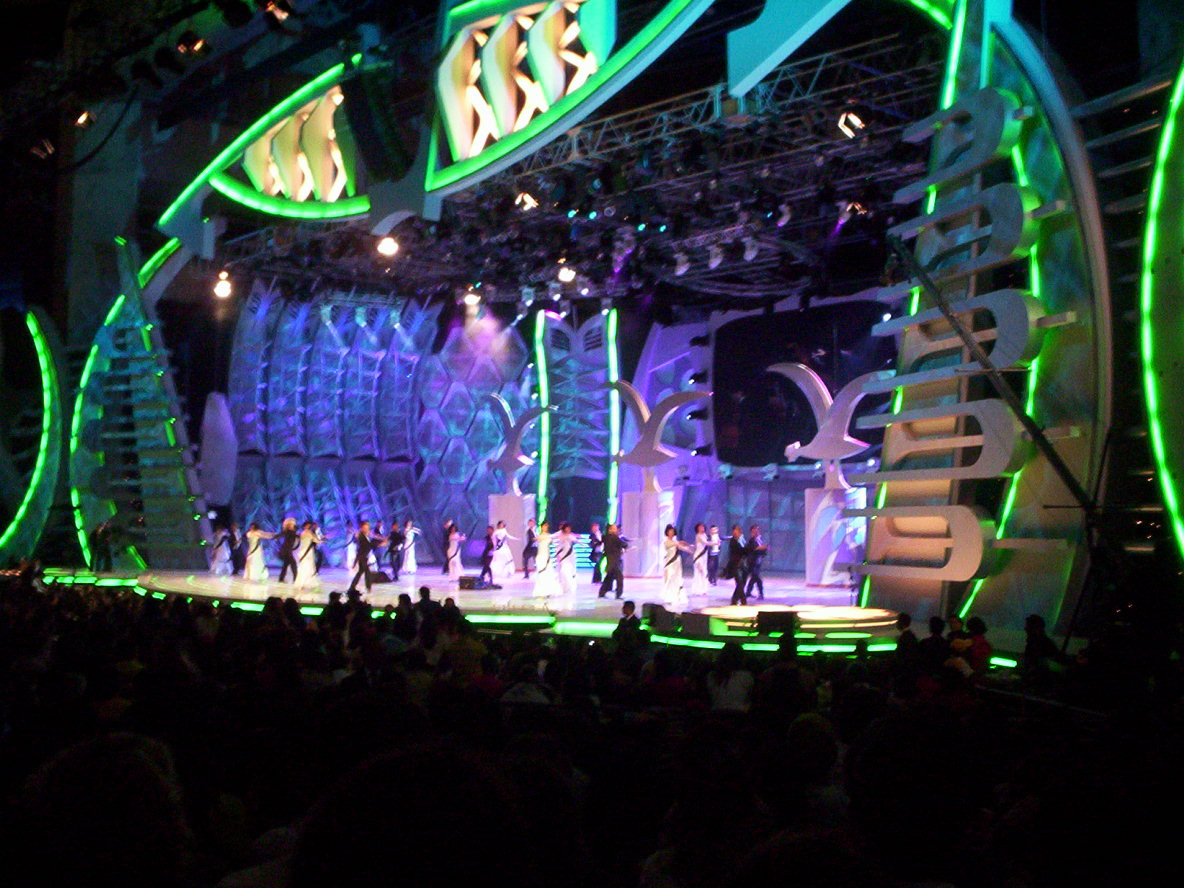
In 1986 hundreds of Chilean youths received Soda Stereo as popular idols. The song that created this first contact was Nada personal (:es)" (Nothing Personal) which became a radio hit. A little later in February 1987 Soda had a strong showing at the Viña del Mar International Song Festival, again in Chile. This, in effect, opened the doors to the rest of Latin America.

In 1986 Soda Stereo made their first Latin American tour, called Signos – still touring with the Nada personal record. The band played for first time in Ecuador, Colombia, Costa Rica, Peru, and Chile with considerable success. In Chile they gave four performances in Santiago, on 21, 22, 24, and 25 November, and one in Valparaíso on 22 November 1986. In November 1986 Soda arrived in Peru for the first time and revolutionized the market. Their album sales were good and their three shows at the Amauta Coliseum were successful.

At that time Latin rock was not that popular with the youth of Latin America (with the exceptions of Argentina and Uruguay) and bands were not accustomed to international tours.

=== First United States concerts (1985–1986) ===
In 1985, Soda Stereo visited Los Angeles California for a press tour and was interviewed by Miguel Banojian, a U.S. journalist with a degree from UCLA, who was also the first Hispanic rock concert promoter in Los Angeles, and was scheduling Hispanic music concerts around Hollywood in clubs like Whisky a GoGo and the Rainbow & Paladium Theater hall; Mr. Banojian with the support of the record label and the sponsorship of M&M chocolate brand, scheduled Soda Stereo's first United States concert at the Paladium hall on Vine Blvd for a packed audience of more than 2,200 people. Later on the same year Mr. Banojian repeated the show at the same theater with a second sold out show. From that moment, Soda Stereo started to be played in radio stations in the U.S and several television interviews followed.

On 10 November 1986 the band released their third album Signos. With its lead single "Persiana Americana" , Signos was a key step for Soda Stereo, who had come under a great deal of stress due to ever increasing sales expectations, external pressures, the risk of failure, and internal tensions. The band was joined in the studio by Fabián Vön Quintiero on keys, Richard Coleman on guitar and Celsa Mel Gowland on back up vocals. Signos became the first Argentine rock album to be released on compact disc. It was manufactured in the Netherlands and distributed throughout Latin America.

On 3 December Soda made their first appearance in Ecuador. In early 1987 Soda returned to Chile, this time to the Viña del Mar International Song Festival where they won the prize "Antorcha de Plata" (Silver Torch). The festival was broadcast via television to many Latin American countries, expanding the band's fame throughout the continent. It did not take long to transform itself into a massive unconditional following which was called "Sodamania".

On 23 April 1987, Soda broke records for ticket sales in Paraguay with their show at the Yacht Club. Meanwhile, Signos reached Platinum status in Argentina, triple platinum in Peru and double platinum in Chile. Soda's first show in Mexico occurred on 4 August 1987 at the Magic Circus in Mexico City.

The Signos tour was a milestone for Soda as they played 22 concerts in 17 cities to almost 350,000 fans, in the process opening up the idea that Latin Rock can transcend the nationalities of the bands, something that would come to fruition in the upcoming decade. With live recordings from different shows, a live album Ruido Blanco was compiled in 1987. Mixed in Barbados, it was considered by Rolling Stone (Argentina) to be one of the top 5 live albums of Argentine Rock.

In late 1988 Soda Stereo were considered the most important band of Latin American pop/rock. They began to work on a new album alongside Puerto Rican producer Carlos Alomar. Alomar had worked with David Bowie, Mick Jagger, Simple Minds, Iggy Pop, and Paul McCartney, among others. Doble Vida (Double Life) was recorded and mixed in New York City, and was the first record by an Argentine band to be completely recorded abroad.

The album produced four singles, "Picnic en el 4º B" (Picnic in Room 4B), "En la Ciudad de la Furia" (In the City of Fury), and "Lo Que Sangra (La Cúpula)" (That Which Bleeds (The Dome)), and "Corazón Delator" (Tell-Tale Heart). The video for "En La Ciudad de La Furia", directed by Alfredo Lois, was a finalist for an MTV Video Award in the category of best foreign video (there was no Latin MTV at the time).

After more than a year without playing in Buenos Aires, Soda showcased Doble Vida at the hockey field at Obras in front of 25,000 fans. To top the year, Soda headlined the Three Days for Democracy Festival, which took place in Buenos Aires on the intersection of Avenida del Libertador and 9 de Julio. The show was attended by 150,000 people and Soda shared the stage with Luis Alberto Spinetta Fito Páez, Los Ratones Paranoicos, Man Ray, and others.

With sales of a million copies of Doble Vida under their belt, Soda began a massive tour in early 1989. The tour began with 30 shows in Argentina, covering most of the country, which were attended by nearly 270,000 fans. These shows were followed by a new Latin American tour (their third), which cemented a massive following in Mexico.

Near the end of 1989 Soda records a new version of "Languis" (from Doble Vida) and a new song titled "Mundo de Quimeras" (World of Chimeras). Both songs were released in the EP Languis (1989) along with remixes of "En El Borde" and "Lo Que Sangra (La Cúpula)". Following the release of Languis Soda played two sold-out shows at The Palace in Los Angeles, becoming the second Rock en Español to play in the United States, following Miguel Mateos.

=== Consecration: Canción Animal (1990–1991) ===
The album Canción Animal, released in 1990, is considered to be one of the best albums of all time of the Latin Rock genre.

In early 1990 the band co-headlined a show for 32,000 people with British new wave band Tears for Fears at the José Amalfitani Stadium in Buenos Aires.

Soda Stereo then traveled to Criteria Studios in Miami, Florida, to begin work on their fifth album. They would enlist the help of Daniel Melero, Andrea Álvarez, and Tweety González (all very important figures in the Argentine rock scene of the time).

The resulting album Canción Animal (1990) is considered to be one of the best albums in the history of Latin rock. It contains their best known song "De Música Ligera" (Of Light Music), as well as other classics such as "Canción Animal" (Animal Song), "Un Millón de Años Luz" (A Million Light Years), "En el Séptimo Día" (On the Seventh Day), and "Té Para Tres" (Tea For Three). These songs are considered to be the band's strongest and at the same time are their most popular. Overall, the album is considered as the most consistent work by the band, along with Signos.

Their massive tour Animal (1990–1991) included 30 Argentine cities, many which had not been visited by a band with the reach of Soda Stereo. The cities visited in Argentina were: San Juan, Santa Fe de la Vera Cruz, Junín, Clorinda, Puerto Iguazú, Trelew, Neuquén, Santa Rosa, Trenque Lauquen Mendoza, Córdoba, Río Cuarto, Santiago del Estero, San Miguel de Tucumán, Salta, Rosario, Buenos Aires, Olavarria, Pergamino. International cities included: Santiago de Chile, Asunción, Punta del Este, Barquisimeto, Caracas, Valencia, Mérida, San Cristóbal, Mexico City, Monterrey, Guadalajara, Mexicali, and Tijuana.

The tour finished with 14 consecutive shows at the Grand Rex Theatre in Buenos Aires. With a 3,300 person capacity, this was a noticeable achievement at the time. Some of the Grand Rex shows would appear on the live EP Rex Mix (1991), which included remixed versions of a new song, "No Necesito Verte (Para Saberlo)" (I don't Need to See You – To Know).

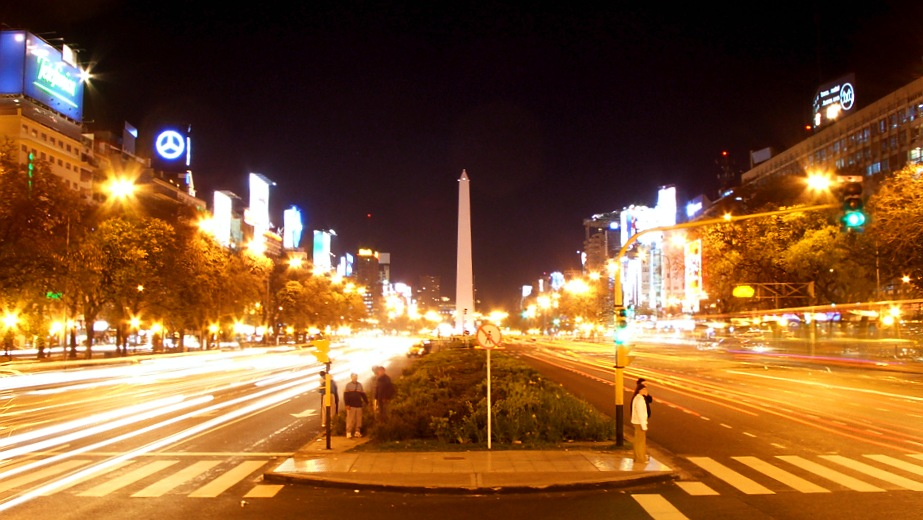
Avenida 9 de Julio in Buenos Aires. On 14 December 1991 Soda gave a free concert here to more than 250,000 people.

By late 1991 Soda's continental success brought the band to the attention of MTV News Europe, who began to take notice of what was taking place in Latin America, particularly with Rock en Español. MTV unconditionally dedicated a whole show to Soda – a first for non English singing band.

In May 1992 Soda embarked on a tour of Spain with shows in Madrid, Oviedo, Sevilla, Valencia, and Barcelona. The lackluster results of the Spanish tour, compared to the fervor they were accustomed to in Latin America, left a sour taste in their mouths. Nevertheless, it did serve as a valid experience, specifically in bringing the band back to earth. To put it bluntly: Spain was in no way a failure, but was far from the success that Soda had been used to in Latin America, in the end it was a good learning experience.

=== Experimentation and change in style: Dynamo, Cerati's solo career, and musical hiatus (1992–1994) ===
==== Dynamo, related tours and Cerati's solo career (1992–1993) ====
In March 1992, Argentine producer and musician Daniel Melero and Gustavo Cerati released an album titled Colores Santos, Cerati's first musical venture away from the band. Heavily influenced by Melero's experimentation with electronic music, it was stylistically not indicative of Cerati's "rock-centered" works, instead choosing to follow a drastically different pattern containing elements from neo-psychedelia and dream pop. Cerati would depart to Spain immediately following the album's release for touring with Soda Stereo – upon returning that May, the band immediately began work on new music.

Nearing the end of 1992 Soda began showcasing their sixth studio album Dynamo, first introduced to the public with six concerts at Obras. The band also showcased the album in its entirety in a local talk-show, Fax, famous for being the first stereophonic TV transmission in Argentine history. The album, eventually released near the end of 1992, is stylistically a shoegazing album, and was met with alienation and shock from many fans of the band, who found its radical shift in style from Canción Animal discomforting and challenging to cope with. Surrounding the band's rushed decision to change record companies from BMG to Sony immediately before the disc's release, Dynamo failed to sell as expected, and remains the lowest-selling album of Soda's career today. Despite these challenges, Soda began their sixth tour of Latin America to begin 1993, during which time Cerati officially kickstarted his solo career with the release of Amor Amarillo, his debut album.

==== Challenges and eventual musical hiatus (1994) ====
1994 met with fresh challenges to the band and its stability. On 4 July 1994, Zeta Bosio's young son was killed in a freak transit accident in Argentina. This event would deeply affect Zeta on both a personal and professional level, and surrounding his inability to work and growing dysfunction within the band, Soda unanimously decided to take a hiatus to possibly mediate the decision of separating permanently.

During this hiatus, the band's members would explore other personal endeavors. Cerati explored his solo career, Zeta dedicating himself to the production of other bands (Peligrosos Gorriones and Aguirre), while Alberti disappeared from the music scene to focus on personal projects.

At the end of 1994 Zona de Promesas, a compilation of remixes and classic Soda songs, including the unreleased song that gave the album its name, was released.

=== Sueño Stereo (1995–1997) ===
1995 saw the release of Sueño Stereo, the last of Soda's seven studio albums. The cover depicts three speaker cones (meant to symbolize egg cells) ready to be "fertilized" by black spermatozoa, the latter of which resembles earbuds. This motif is symbolic of the album's concept, and is even used as a focal point in the music video for "Ella usó mi cabeza como un revólver", a single from the recording.

After a three-year absence, on 29 June 1995, Soda released Sueño Stereo, their 7th and final studio album. The album was an instant hit, quickly reaching platinum status in Argentina 15 days after its release. The album was powered by the radio hit "Zoom" and the promotional video for "Ella usó mi cabeza como un revólver", which in 1996 won the Viewer's Choice Award presented by MTV Latin America.

According to Cerati, the album was retroactively a source of pride for him and his band:

Sueño Stereo took two years to conceive. It would be illogical to say that this was [our] masterpiece, but it was the most emotional work [we had done] at the time, because we were stripped of the need of having competition in the future, or of being the best for another ten years. We had already made it through a lot of things and the band itself felt classic. On the other hand, we were very proud of what Dynamo had promoted and [how it was subsequently interpreted]... The band had to deliver something important; it couldn't just be "any" record. [We had] to find ourselves again after a while and allow the music to flow, without thinking too much about taking huge steps or anything like that. All-in-all, Sueño Stereo is one of the most innovative records of our career, without us trying to make it so – because of its sonic combinations, its lyrics, and because of its sound.

The record became the catalyst for the extensive Gira Sueño Stereo (Sueño Stereo Tour), which began on 8 September in Buenos Aires, at the Grand Rex Theater – it spanned Venezuela, Colombia, Peru, Panama, Mexico and the United States (Los Angeles, Chicago, New York and Miami). The tour ended on 24 April 1996 at the Teatro Teletón in Santiago.

In mid 1996 Soda was invited to Miami by MTV to record a session for their acoustic show, MTV Unplugged. Soda, initially reluctant to play, was finally able to negotiate with the network to play with a unique setup: the band would play "plugged in", but with modifications such as heavy orchestration, including brand-new arrangements of some of their classic songs. The result was an eclectic mix of music, an acoustic-electric hybrid. A highlight of the album was a soaring rendition of "En La Ciudad De La Furia", where the chorus was sung by Andrea Echeverri of the Colombian Rock en Español band Aterciopelados. Other songs recorded included "Un Misil en Mi Placard", "Entre Canibales", "Cuando pase el temblor", "Té Para Tres", "Angel Electrico", "Terapia de Amor Intensiva", "Disco Eterno", "Ella usó mi cabeza como un revólver", "Paseando Por Roma" and "Génesis" (a cover of Vox Dei). The recording of the MTV show would be partially released on the album Comfort y Música Para Volar in 1996, and in its entirety in a new version of Comfort released in 2007. The album contained 4 new tracks from the Sueño Stereo sessions, as well as an interactive CD-ROM with pictures and videos from the show.

On 30 October 1996 Soda Stereo became the first Latin American band to transmit a live concert via the Internet, through the Argentine radio program Cuál Es? (Which Is It?). The show was conducted by Mario Pergolini on Argentina Rock & Pop radio. The band played live from the music store Promúsica in Buenos Aires.

=== Band breakup and El Último Concierto (1997) ===
The band went silent for a time preceding the separation. The only publicity was the band's participation on the tribute album, Tributo a Queen: Los Grandes del Rock en Español, in which Soda Stereo covered "Some Day One Day" from Queen's 1974 album, Queen II. Their version was sung in Spanish, as "Algun Día".

Unexpectedly, Soda officially announced their separation in May 1997, through a press release. The following day, Argentine newspapers reported the news. Argentine newspaper Clarín devoted its entire front page to the breakup. The following day, Gustavo Cerati's farewell note was published on the Music section of the newspaper:

[This letter has been] inspired from what I have seen on the street these days: fans who have approached me, the people around me, and from my own personal experiences. I share the sadness that has been created in many by our separation. I, myself, am immersed in that state because few things have been so important to me in my life as Soda Stereo. Everyone knows that it is impossible to lead a band without a certain level of conflict. It is a fragile equilibrium in the war of ideas that very few are able to handle for fifteen years, as we proudly did [and maintained]. But, ultimately, different personal and musical misunderstandings began to compromise that equilibrium... excuses were generated for not confronting ourselves, excuses for a future group that we no longer believed in as we did in the past. To end for the sake of the band is, in its redundancy, to [give importance] to our mental health, and above all to show respect for all of our fans who have followed us for such a long time. Goodbye.

The band played a farewell tour, making stops in Mexico, Venezuela, Chile and their native Argentina. Their final concert took place on 20 September at the River Plate Stadium in Buenos Aires, and was recorded and released in two parts, El Último Concierto A and B. The show ended with the song "De Musica Ligera" and a memorable farewell by Cerati:

(Original, Spanish) ¡No solo no hubiéramos sido nada sin ustedes, sino con toda la gente que estuvo a nuestro alrededor desde el comienzo; algunos siguen hasta hoy! ¡Gracias... totales!

(English translation) [We would not have] been anything without [you all], but [also] without everyone that supported us since the very beginning; some still do till this day! A huge... thank you!

A DVD of the farewell show was released in 2005. A compilation CD was released later that year titled Chau Soda ("Bye Soda").

In 1995, the band won the Merit Diploma at the Konex Awards for their outstanding career in Argentine music during the decade and the Platinum Konex Award for Best Argentine Rock Band of the Decade. In 2002, they received the first MTV Legend Award for their musical career. In 2006, the American magazine Al Borde listed many of the band's songs among the best 500 songs in the Spanish-speaking Americas. In 2002, the Argentine edition of the Rolling Stone magazine in partnership with MTV issued a list featuring Soda Stereo's songs among the best 100 rock songs in Argentina.

=== Post Soda ===
Despite the constant rumors of a reunion, which ironically started shortly after the breakup, little was heard regarding Soda, except for a TV special on El Ultimo Concierto (The Last Concert) produced by HBO and an MTV documentary titled Soda Stereo: La Leyenda (Soda Stereo: The Legend). Finally, in 2002 the trio was reunited at the MTV Latin Music Video Awards where they were awarded the Legend award in honor of their musical and visual trajectory.

Seven years after the breakup and the absence of any new official releases seemed odd. Near the end of 2003 Sony Music announced the release of the first DVD by Soda Stereo, which contained much unreleased material from compiled by Gustavo, Zeta, Charly, and people close to the band. The finished product arrived on the streets in November 2004. It was titled, Soda Stereo: Una Parte de La Euforia (1983–1997) (Soda Stereo: A Part of the Euphoria (1983–1997)). On 20 September 2005 an Argentine DVD of Soda's last concert, which took place exactly 8 years before at River Plate stadium was released. It was titled El Ultimo Concierto (En Vivo) (The Last Concert – Live). The DVD, in contrast to the HBO production, featured a 5.1 audio and included two songs that were not aired on the HBO concert, "Juegos de Seduccion" and "Sobredosis de TV". It also included a multi camera option for a soundcheck of "Primavera 0" and a 25-minute documentary about the tour featuring footage of sound checks and concerts in Mexico, Venezuela, and Argentina. It also featured an interview with the long lost "fourth Soda" Alfredo Lois, the director of the DVD, one of his last works before his death.

=== Me Verás Volver (2007) ===
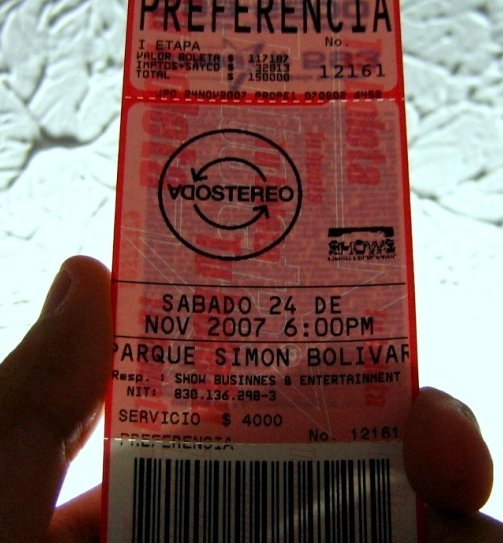
«Me verás Volver». Ticket for the Bogotá (Colombia) show. Soda Stereo reunited one million fans during their 2007 reunion tour.

The reunion of Soda stereo was a mandatory topic for journalists whenever faced with a former member. So much so, that Zeta Bosio once declared:

"One day I dreamed that I was not going to be asked about a Soda reunion!"

In 2007, ten years after their breakup, the band decided to reunite for a one-time-only tour of Latin America. On 6 June 2007, the official news came out: Soda Stereo would return to the stage with a sole American tour called Me Veras Volver (You Will See My Return), an emblematic line from "En La Ciudad de la Furia".

In early July, Sony/BMG released a new compilation album titled Me Verás Volver (Hits & +). The album contained 18 remastered studio recordings and lacked of new material, but it did contain a code to access exclusive web footage such as live versions. The album reached number one in Argentina and Chile.

On 20 September 2007, exactly 10 years since their last concert, Soda Stereo gave a long-awaited press conference at the Club Museum in Buenos Aires, in a historical building designed at the turn of the century by the famous French architect and structural engineer Gustave Eiffel. This building had been used, years before, as the location for their music video for "En La Ciudad De La Furia". They surprised the attendance with a mini concert of two songs, "Sobredosis de TV" and "En La Ciudad de La Furia", played in their original format, performed solely by the trio. During the press conference, they clarified that after the tour they intended on resuming their individual pursuits.

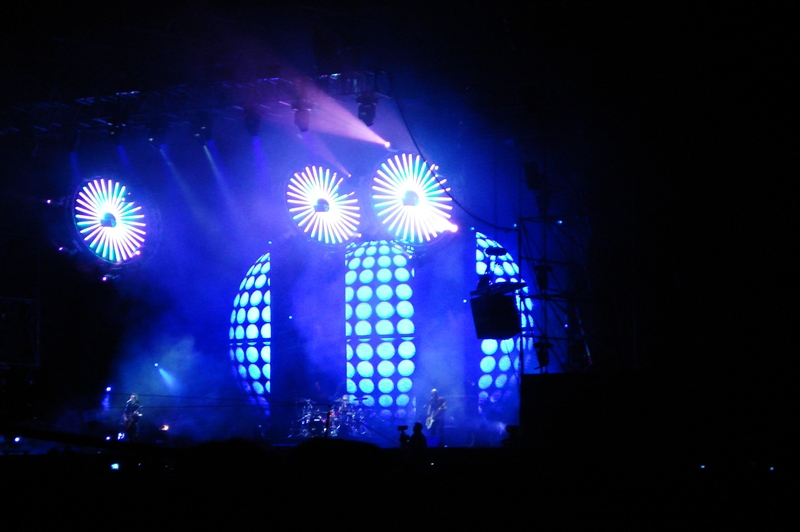
"You Will See Me Return". A picture of the show at the Julio Martínez Stadium in Santiago, Chile on 24 October 2007.

The tour was scheduled to begin on 19 October at River Plate Stadium in Buenos Aires, and originally only two concerts were scheduled as well as performances in several Latin American countries. However, from the time the tickets went on sale it became apparent that it wouldn't be enough, and that the band was faced with a huge continent-wide cultural event. Over 90,000 tickets were sold in only 24 hours. The band quickly added another show to the schedule, which sold out in 3 days, so 2 more dates were added.

Finally on 19 October 2007, the time came for the triumphant return of Soda Stereo at the River Plate Stadium in Argentina. A massive banner that contained a large sentence with the name of their songs intertwined was unveiled.

The band was accompanied by one of the main "fourth Soda's" Tweety Gonzalez (keyboards), as well as Leandro Fresco (keyboards, percussion, and backing vocals), and Leo Garcia on guitars and backing vocals. The concert lasted more than three hours. Soda played a total of 28 songs. The show opened with a recording of "Algun Dia" their cover of Queen's "Someday One Day" meanwhile images of the history of Soda Stereo appeared in the background.

The expected number of fans attending the five shows was more than 300,000, making Soda Stereo one of the most watched public events in the history of Argentina. Soda became the only band to play more than five times in the Estadio Monumental in Argentina in a single tour. Me Verás Volver featured 22 concerts throughout America including three shows in the US -all but two were sold out[42].

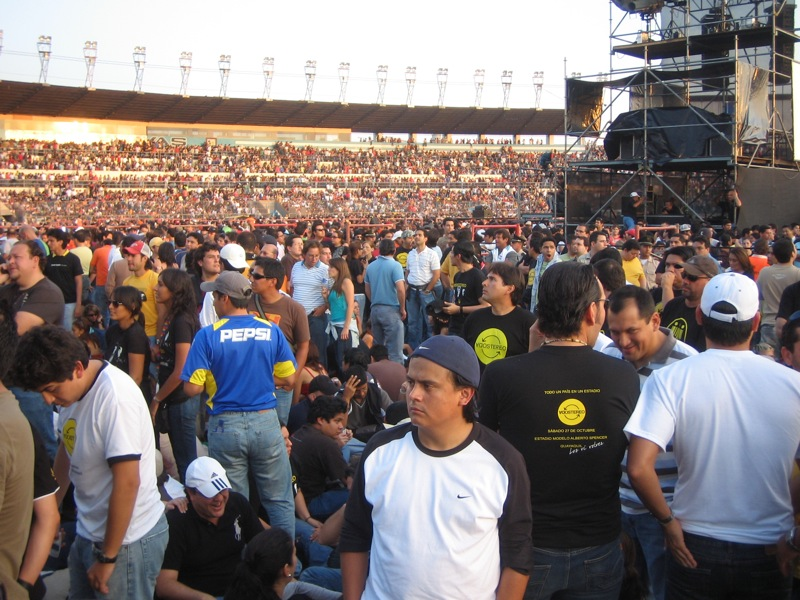
27 October 2007 Alberto Spencer National Stadium in Guayaquil, Ecuador. The public awaits the return of Soda Stereo.

In October 2007 Sony/BMG released Comfort Y Música Para Volar on DVD. The DVD included all of the songs recorded for the MTV Unplugged session.

On 21 December 2007 the last concert was held at the River Plate Stadium in Buenos Aires. Three extra songs were played for this show, "Si No Fuera Por", "Terapia de Amor Intensiva", and "Lo Que Sangra (La Cúpula)". The band was joined by Andrea Álvarez for "Picnic en el 4B", Richard Coleman for "No Existes", Fabián "Zorrito Vön" Quintiero for "Danza Rota" and "Profugos", Carlos Alomar for "Lo Que Sangra (La Cúpula)" and "Terapia de Amor Intensiva", and Gillespie for "Signos" and "Fue". Cerati returned to use his famous expression "gracias totales", and after playing "De Musica Ligera". Finally, Cerati played the riff of "Sueles Dejarme Solo" and smashed his guitar.

== Influences ==
The main influence that Soda Stereo received during their career was of British rock. Among the most influential artists for the band sound are the Beatles and solo careers of George Harrison, Paul McCartney and John Lennon; the Police, the Cure, Echo & the Bunnymen, Television, Talking Heads, Elvis Costello, David Bowie, Virus, XTC, the Specials, Squeeze, Pink Floyd, Luis Alberto Spinetta, Queen (in 1997 band recorded tribute song "Algún día"), My Bloody Valentine and Cocteau Twins.

== Legacy ==
Soda Stereo has been considered a pioneering Latin rock band. It was the first band to come out strongly in the local limits of their country of origin and to consider Latin America as a unified cultural space for the language, including the US. The result was a popular and widespread identification of Latino youth, above countries, which was made for the Anglo-Saxon rock, but not for the Latin rock, rock in Spanish and Latin American rock, different variants the same cultural-musical phenomenon.

Soda Stereo was the beginning of a globalization movement that incorporated local musicians into a great continental rock movement, up to the point of leading local critics to wonder: "Does it make sense to keep talking about 'national rock'?". In many parts of Latin America, including Colombia, "Soda Stereo became the expression of the musicality and poise of a new generation, one which tried to differentiate themselves from that of those in their thirties in the 1980s who preferred the Dominican merengue, by beginning to listen and sing rock in Spanish." In Chile, Soda not only marked a whole generation with their looks, lyrics and music, but especially by way of the intense emotional relationship developed between the band and its fans, which was a decisive factor to "de-nationalize" the band and make it an expression, and not only young people in a particular country, but youth as a sector uniform social issues and common languages, something that rock and roll had not been achieved so far in the Spanish-speaking countries due to language barrier.

== Records and achievements ==
- The First Latin American artist to use the CD format in the album Signos.
- The First Latin American group to have a TV broadcast with stereo sound during the presentation of their album Dynamo in the program "Fax en Concierto", in 1992.
- The first Spanish-language band to play in the United States as the headliner.
- The first Spanish-language band to tour Latin America. Formerly, Latin rock groups rarely left their home country and when they did it was usually without much success. Soda Stereo was the first that endeavored to, and succeeded at, expanding their fanbase beyond their borders and across all of South America.
- The first Ibero-American band to include an interactive track on an album, in this case with the MTV Unplugged album, Comfort y Música Para Volar, in 1996.
- In the tour "Me Verás Volver 2007", the band set a record by performing six concerts at the Estadio Monumental de River Plate on the same tour, beating the previous mark of five concerts held by the Rolling Stones. (This record was beaten later in 2012 by Roger Waters who performed nine shows at the stadium)
- Before the tour Me Verás Volver, Robbie Williams held the record for most tickets sold in the shortest amount of time in Argentina (River Plate stadium sold out in five days), but the record was broken by Soda Stereo in 2007 when they sold out two concerts at the River Plate Stadium in less than a day.
- In Chile, they beat the record for most tickets sold at the Estadio Nacional de Chile in Santiago, selling 126 000 tickets for two dates and surpassing Los Prisioneros, who held the previous record with two concerts in 2001. (However, this record was beaten a year later in 2008 by Madonna on her Sticky and Sweet tour.)
- Highest attendance at a paid concert in Venezuela. more than 55,000 fans gathered at the Hippodrome de la Rinconada in Caracas in 2007, during the Me Verás Volver tour.
- Highest attendance at a paid concert in Colombia. 52,000 people gathered at Simón Bolívar Park Bogotá, in 2007, during the Me Verás Volver tour.
- Highest attendance at a paid concert at the National Stadium, Panama, with 22,000 spectators, 27 November 2007.
- Highest attendance at a concert at Estadio Mario Alberto Kempes, with 48,000 spectators on 15 December 2007. A record previously held by los Redondos.

== Solo work ==
=== Gustavo Cerati ===
Cerati worked with Daniel Melero in the 1992 album Colores Santos, he co-wrote and produced most of the songs and although the album was never formally presented, two singles were released, "Vuelta por el Universo" and "Hoy Ya No Soy Yo". Cerati's second solo album was Amor Amarillo (1993), it contained collaborations by Zeta Bosio and Cerati's (then) wife Cecilia Amenábar.

After Soda's separation, Cerati released the studio albums Bocanada (1999), +Bien (2001) and Siempre Es Hoy (2002). In 2002 he released 11 Episodios Sinfónicos, which contained Soda Stereo and solo songs played live with a symphonic orchestra. Cerati also released electronic music as Plan V, and other projects. Ahí Vamos! (2006), is considered as a back-to-basics return. His last album was Fuerza Natural (2009), which was very well received by fans and critics alike.

He also produced albums for other artists, such as Nicole, Leo García and Altocamet, as well as for the band Friccion, in which he was a guitarist in the 1980s.

On 15 May 2010, Cerati suffered from a stroke after a concert in Caracas, Venezuela. After four years in a coma, on 4 September 2014, Gustavo Cerati died of respiratory arrest in Buenos Aires, Argentina.

=== Zeta Bosio ===
Bosio has had a low profile over the years. He is working with Proyecto Under, an online portal for musicians, and performing as a DJ. He also produced albums with many bands, such as Aguirre and Peligrosos Gorriones. In a recent interview, he declared that he has no interest to play in a band. He is also the artistic director of an independent label, Alerta Records. In 1997 he produced Nacion Hip Hop, a CD compilation of local underground rap artists that is considered the founding stone of Argentine's hip hop scene. He also worked closely with hip hop act Tumbas (who opened for Soda Stereo in their last concert) and DJ Tortuga, who later became part of the experimental hip hop trio Koxmoz.

=== Charly Alberti ===
Alberti released one studio album without Soda Stereo in 1994, Plum, along with his then girlfriend, supermodel Deborah de Corral, and since 1997 Alberti became interested in informatics, he was involved in running his company Cybrel Digital Entertainment, that aimed at generating and implementing content based technologies. He was named an Applemaster for his contributions to the music world.

In 1998, he started two new projects, URL Magazine, a culture magazine, and URL Records, a discographic label. He is also the founder of YeYeYe and Musike, two portals about music and entertainment.

Alberti recently formed another rock band with his brother, Andrés Alberti, and recorded their first album named as the band, MOLE. Alberti stated that he does not want Mole's sound to sound like Soda Stereo, he wants "Mole to live by itself."

== Band members ==
=== Former members ===
- Gustavo Cerati – lead vocals, guitars, keyboards, synthesizers (1982–1997, 2007, died 2014)
- Zeta Bosio – bass guitar, guitars, backing vocals (1982–1997, 2007, 2020-2022)
- Charly Alberti – drums, percussion (1982–1997, 2007, 2020-2022)

=== Session and touring musicians ===
- Richard Coleman – guitars (1982–1983; 1997)
- Gonzo Palacios – saxophone (1984–1986)
- Fabian Quintiero – keyboards, synthesizers, piano (1985–1987; 1997)
- Daniel Sais – keyboards, synthesizers, piano (1987–1989; 1997)
- Tweety González – keyboards, synthesizers, piano, programming, sampler (1989–1997, 2007)
- Marcelo Sánchez – saxophone (1988–1989)
- Andrea Álvarez – percussion (1989–1991; 1997; 2007)
- Axel Krygier – flute, saxophone, keyboards, percussion (1997)
- Alejandro Terán – saxophone, violin, guitars, percussion (1997)

=== Fourth and Fifth Soda classification ===
Similar to the concept of the fifth Beatle, fans often referred to various studio and live contributors as being "the Fourth Soda". Keyboardist Tweety González and director Alfredo Lois, who directed various Soda Stereo music videos, are often the two contributors primarily associated with the "Fourth Soda" mantle. Other contributors often associated with the title of "the Fourth Soda" include producer Daniel Melero, studio and live keyboardist Fabian Quintiero, guitarist Richard Coleman, and frequent guest musician Daniel Sais. In addition, fans often cited other contributors such as saxophonists Gonzo Palacios and Marcelo Sánchez, percussionist Andrea Álvarez as well as multi instrumentalist Axel Krygier (who briefly toured with the band in 1997), director and musician Alejandro Terán and lyricist Flavio Etcheto as being the "Fifth Soda"

== Tours ==
- 1983–1984: Gira Under
- 1984–1985: Gira Soda Stereo
- 1985–1986: Gira Nada Personal
- 1986–1988: Gira Signos
- 1988–1989: Gira Doble Vida
- 1989–1990: Gira Languis
- 1990–1992: Gira Animal
- 1992–1993: Gira Dynamo
- 1995–1996: Gira Sueño Stereo
- 1996: MTV Unplugged
- 1997: El Último Concierto
- 2007: Gira Me Verás Volver
- 2020–2022: Gracias Totales – Soda Stereo
- 2026: Soda Stereo Ecos

== Discography ==
=== Studio albums ===
- Soda Stereo (1984)
- Nada personal (1985)
- Signos (1986)
- Doble Vida (1988)
- Canción Animal (1990)
- Dynamo (1992)
- Sueño Stereo (1995)

=== Videography ===
- Ruido Blanco (1988)
- Canción Animal (1991)
- Una Parte de la Euforia (2004)
- El Último Concierto (2005)
- Comfort y Música Para Volar (2007)
- Gira Me Verás Volver (2008)
- Gracias Totales - Soda Stereo (2022)

=== Live and remix albums ===
- Ruido Blanco (1987)
- Languis (EP) (1989)
- Rex Mix (1991)
- Zona de Promesas (1993)
- Comfort y Música Para Volar (1996)
- El Último Concierto A (1997)
- El Último Concierto B (1997)
- Gira Me Verás Volver #1 (2008)
- Gira Me Verás Volver #2 (2008)
- Soda Stereo: Sép7imo Día - No Descansaré (2017)

=== Compilations ===
- Lo Mejor de los Mejores (1993)
- 20 Grandes Éxitos (1994)
- El Legado de Soda Stereo (1995)
- Sobredosis de TV (1996)
- Chau Soda (1997)
- Rock del Milenio (1999)
- Inolvidable (1999)
- 30 Grandes (1999)
- Obras Cumbres (2000)
- El Legado (2004)
- Leyendas: Solamente los Mejores (2004)
- 20 Éxitos Originales (2005)
- Obras Cumbres: Parte 2 (2006)
- Lo Esencial (2007)
- Me Verás Volver (Hits & +) (2007)
- Rock Latino (2012)
