= Nada personal (album) =

Studio album by Soda Stereo
- Released: November 21, 1985
- Recorded: 1985
- Studio: Estudios Moebio, Buenos Aires
- Genre: New wave
- Length: 40:28
- Label: Discos CBS
- Producer: Soda Stereo

Soda Stereo chronology
Soda Stereo (1984)	Nada personal (1985)	Signos (1986)

Singles from Nada personal
- 1. "Imágenes Retro" Released: January 1985 (ARG); 2. "Nada Personal" Released: October 4, 1985; 3. "Cuando pase el temblor" Released: October 30, 1985 (CR); 4. "Juegos de Seducción" Released: December 2, 1985

Professional ratings
Review scores
Source	Rating
AllMusic	2.5/5 stars

Nada Personal (Spanish for Nothing Personal) is the second album recorded by Argentine rock band Soda Stereo, released in 1985. It was recorded at Estudios Moebio in Buenos Aires, Argentina, and remastered in 2007 at Sterling Sound Studios in New York.

Nada Personal provided the band with at least three successful singles, which became the breakout songs for the band all over Hispano-America. The album showed Soda Stereo venturing in a new musical direction, focused mainly on the British new wave style. The most successful singles from the album were "Juegos de seducción" (Seduction Games), "Nada personal" (Nothing Personal) and "Cuando pase el temblor" (When the Trembling Ends). Those songs enjoyed strong airplay during 1985 and 1986, primarily in Argentina, Mexico, Uruguay and Chile.

Such successful songs were performed live twice at the Viña del Mar International Song Festival held in Chile in February 1987.

== Background ==
The album was recorded and mixed at the Moebio studios in Buenos Aires (Argentina) with technician Mariano López as sound engineer.

Nada Personal also presents, in some songs, the band's intention to explore new sounds, as in "Estoy azulado", a song that begins with a climactic sax introduction by Gonzalo Palacios, and in "Cuando pase el temblor", a song that mixes rock with Andean music typical of northwestern Argentina. Without abandoning danceable rhythms, this second LP achieved more depth in the lyrics and maturity in the melodies.

Well received by critics, it meant a huge increase in popularity for the band. In Argentina alone, it sold around 180,000 copies in the first few months. The disc meant the definitive consecration of Soda Stereo before the Argentine public.

In April 1986, Soda Stereo recorded a video clip of the song "Cuando pase el temblor" in the ruins of Pucará, in Tilcara, Jujuy, under the direction of Alfredo Lois.

Gustavo Cerati comments on the album:

"The advent of reverberation chambers and eighties sound tricks. On this record I started to learn how to make songs."

== Promotion ==
During the southern summer of 1986, the group toured Argentine tourist centers to promote the album, playing in Mar del Plata, Villa Gesell and Pinamar, also adding a consecration concert at the La Falda Festival, in Córdoba, which featured the participation of Andrés Calamaro and Charly García as guest keyboardists on the song "¿Por qué no puedo ser del Jet-Set?".

In April 1986, 22,000 spectators burst through the four performances that served to officially present the album at the Obras Sanitarias Stadium in Buenos Aires. In the first of the functions, a lengthy live video was recorded. This video would be called Nada personal en Obras and would be edited months later.

After the concerts performed at Obras, the album's sales began to grow rapidly, rising from gold (which they had achieved during the summer) to platinum, and reaching double that figure in the following months.

At the end of that same year, the band's first Latin American tour took place, covering Colombia, Ecuador, Peru, Chile, Venezuela and Paraguay.

== Track listing ==
All music is composed by Gustavo Cerati, except where noted.

Nada Personal track listing
No.	Title	Writer(s)	Length
1.	"Nada Personal" ("Nothing Personal")	Cerati	4:57
2.	"Si No Fuera Por..." ("If It Wasn't For...")	Cerati, Bosio, Alberti	3:29
3.	"Cuando Pase el Temblor" ("When The Tremor Ends"(***))	Cerati	3:48
4.	"Danza Rota" ("Broken Dance")	Cerati	3:35
5.	"El Cuerpo del Delito" ("Corpus Delicti")	Cerati, Bosio	3:50
6.	"Juego de Seducción" ("Game of Seduction"(***))	Cerati	3:21
7.	"Estoy Azulado" ("I'm Blue")	Cerati, Coleman	5:21
8.	"Observándonos (Satélites)" ("Observing Us (Satellites))	Cerati, Bosio (*)	3:09
9.	"Imágenes Retro" ("Retro Images")	Cerati, Alberti (**)	3:55
10.	"Ecos" ("Echos")	Cerati	4:58
Total length:			39:51

=== Notes ===
- (*) Charly Alberti was credited as a songwriter on the vinyl tracklist.
- (**) Charly Alberti was credited as a songwriter on the CD and cassette tracklist.
- (***) There are recorded versions of both "Cuando Pase el Temblor" and "Juego de Seducción" in English from when the band tried to expand to the English-speaking world, but the idea was discarded.
- In the remastered CD edition in 2007, the musician appears in the song "Observándonos (Satélites)" (*), because the vinyl prints have been copied to the design of said remastering.

== Personnel ==
Soda Stereo

- Gustavo Cerati – Lead Vocals, Guitars
- Zeta Bosio – Bass Guitar, Backing Vocals
- Charly Alberti – Drums, Drum Machine

Additional personnel

- Fabian Vön Quintiero – Keyboards
- Gonzalo Palacios – Sax
- Produced by Soda Stereo

== Sales and certifications ==
Region	Certification	Certified units/sales
Argentina (CAPIF) sales as of 1987	2× Platinum	130,000
Chile	3× Platinum	60,000
Colombia	Gold	35,000
Mexico (AMPROFON)	Platinum+Gold	350,000^{‡}
Peru	Platinum	20,000
Venezuela	Gold	10,000
^{‡} Sales+streaming figures based on certification alone.
