= Soda Stereo (album) =

Studio album by Soda Stereo
- Released: August 27, 1984
- Recorded: Buenos Aires, 1983
- Genres: New wave; pop rock
- Length: 35:05
- Labels: Discos CBS; Columbia Records
- Producer: Federico Moura

Soda Stereo chronology
Soda Stereo (1984)	Nada Personal (1985)

Singles from Soda Stereo
- 1. "Te Hacen Falta Vitaminas" Released: 1984; 2. "Sobredosis de TV" Released: 1984; 3. "¿Por Qué No Puedo Ser Del Jet-Set?" Released: 1984; 4. "Dietético" Released: 1985; 5. "Trátame Suavemente" Released: 1985

Soda Stereo is the debut album recorded by Argentine rock band Soda Stereo, released in August 27, 1984, through Discos CBS. It was produced by Federico Moura, then leader of the band Virus.

The album allowed the band to enter into the Argentine music mainstream and contains some of their first hits like "Trátame Suavemente" and "Te Hacen Falta Vitaminas". Many songs from the album have been included in lists of best songs from Argentine rock and Latin American rock.

It was certified double platinum in Argentina as well as in Peru and Chile within months of its release. The album cover was designed by the band alongside friend Alfredo Lois - it originally featured stills from the three members but they were deemed too photographic and were replaced with drawings and colored paper cuts on top of the pictures.

== Background ==
The band was formed during the early eighties when Gustavo Cerati and Zeta Bosio met while studying Marketing at the Universidad del Salvador in Buenos Aires, Argentina. Later they met Charly Alberti and began playing together. The trio started performing under the name Los Estereotipos and recorded a demo including the song "¿Por qué no puedo ser del Jet-Set?" which would end up as the opening track on their debut album. The trio would eventually change their name to Soda Stereo. They started performing their songs as well as covers from bands like The Police and The Beatles in several bars and recorded a second demo with the songs "Dietético" and "Te Hacen Falta Vitaminas", alongside "¿Por qué no puedo ser del Jet-Set?". The band was discovered by the members of the band Virus during a performance, which led them to be signed by the label CBS to record their first album. Initially their contract consisted of their recording several teen pop covers which was refused by the band and led to the dissolvement of the contract, which was later re-negotiated to allow the band to perform their own songs.

== Recording ==
The album was recorded at CBS Studios in Buenos Aires. Produced by Federico Moura of Virus, the album had to be recorded in rotating schedules with different engineers - despite this the recording took place without much difficulty. Moura has said that "the work was very simple because the songs already had the arrangements resolved and thought out, from the sound of the instruments to the details of the voices". The debut performance of the album took place on October 1, 1984, at one of the restaurants from the fast-food chain Pumper Nic in Buenos Aires, Bosio said that "Pumper was one of the first hamburger chains and it had to do with the spirit of Soda Stereo, with those decorations that took some codes from the new wave that rescued icons that came from the '60s. It had to do with bands that were around punk music that were of our influence, like The Specials". The album was released on vinyl and later re-edited to CD in 1991. The songs "¿Por qué no puedo ser del Jet-Set?", "Sobredosis de TV", "Te Hacen Falta Vitaminas" and "Trátame Suavemente" became very successful for the band, gaining attention from radio stations and music television programs.

== Composition ==
The album is composed of eleven tracks with danceable new wave sounds and lyrics critical of the consumerism of Argentine society of the time. Bosio said about the album that "more than a critique there is an irony, we sought to photograph the society of the moment with an acid vision". It was influenced by different genres, such as the ska of The Specials, the new wave of Madness, the reggae of The Police, Fischer-Z and Men at Work, and the art punk of Television.

The album's lyrics critique different aspects of eighties Argentine society following the National Reorganization Process. "¿Por Qué no Puedo ser del Jet Set?" ("Why Can't I Belong to the Jet-Set?") deals with the superficiality inherent in certain social circles. "Te Hacen Falta Vitaminas" ("You Need Vitamins"), "Dietético" ("Dietetic") and "Mi Novia Tiene Bíceps" ("My Girlfriend Has Biceps") talk about the youth culture, frivolity and hedonism of Argentine society and the prejudices within the rock scene, and "El Tiempo es Dinero" ("Time is Money") makes references to Dorian Gray and critiques consumerism. While the album consists mainly of songs composed by the band, it also includes a cover of the song "Trátame Suavemente" ("Treat Me Gently"), originally written by Daniel Melero and performed by his band Los Encargados. The song is the only ballad on the album; about its inclusion Bosio said that "we did it because we liked them a lot, it was a tribute to a band that had been doing things well and had no recognition, it could easily have been a Sumo song, because it was another of the bands that we were going to see and we were fans, it was a tribute to the scene where we came from".

== Critical reception ==
Professional ratings
Review scores
Source	Rating
AllMusic	4/5 stars

Upon release the album received a positive reaction from music critics. Contemporary critics conclude that while the album is not one of the best in the band's discography, it shows the potential of what the band would eventually do in later efforts. Joaquín Vismara from Silencio called the album "just the first step in a career that was characterized by knowing how to go for more" while Juan Carlos Ballesta from La Dosis said about the album that "thirty-five years later it may sound somewhat naive, inconsistent with respect to the following albums or even derived from the British scene, but its freshness and self-confidence is undeniable, it was the beginning of an influential story of immense repercussion". Additionally, Mario Fernández Bitar, author of biographies of the band, said that "the first album is a perfect kick that anticipates where they can reach".

Several songs from the album have been included in lists of best songs from both Argentine and Latin American rock. American magazine All Borde included "Trátame Suavemente" and "Un Misil en Mi Placard" in their list of "500 Best Iberoamerican Rock Songs" at numbers 417 and 444, respectively, while Argentine website Rock.com placed "Te Hacen Falta Vitaminas" at 73 in their list of "100 Best Argentine Rock Songs".

== Track listing ==
All music is composed by Gustavo Cerati, except where noted.

Soda Stereo track listing
No.	Title	Writer(s)	Length
1.	"Por Qué No Puedo Ser Del Jet-Set?" ("Why Can't I Belong to the Jet-Set?")	Cerati, Ficicchia	2:21
2.	"Sobredosis De T.V." ("TV Overdose")		4:10
3.	"Te Hacen Falta Vitaminas" ("You're Lacking Vitamins")	Bosio, Cerati	2:40
4.	"Trátame Suavemente" ("Treat Me Gently")	Daniel Melero	3:22
5.	"Dietético" ("Dietetic")		3:48
6.	"Tele-Ka" ("Tele-Kay")		2:26
7.	"Ni Un Segundo" ("Not Even One Second")	Bosio, Cerati	3:26
8.	"Un Misil En Mi Placard" ("A Missile in My Closet")		3:07
9.	"El Tiempo Es Dinero" ("Time Is Money")		2:55
10.	"Afrodisíacos" ("Aphrodisiacs")	Bosio, Cerati	4:21
11.	"Mi Novia Tiene Bíceps" ("My Girlfriend Has Biceps")	Bosio, Cerati, Ficicchia	2:24
Total length:			34:46

== Personnel ==
Soda Stereo

- Gustavo Cerati – lead vocals, guitars
- Zeta Bosio – bass guitar, backing vocals
- Charly Alberti – drums, percussion

Technical

- Tito Huber
- Charlie López
- Oscar Giménez

Additional personnel

- Daniel Melero – keyboards
- Gonzalo Palacios – sax
- Federico Moura – production
- Alfredo Lois – design
- Fernanda Cohen – design

== Sales and certifications ==
Region	Certification	Certified units/sales
Argentina (CAPIF) sales as of 1987	Platinum	60,000
Chile	2× Platinum	40,000
Peru	Gold	10,000
