= Zeta Bosio =

Argentine bassist

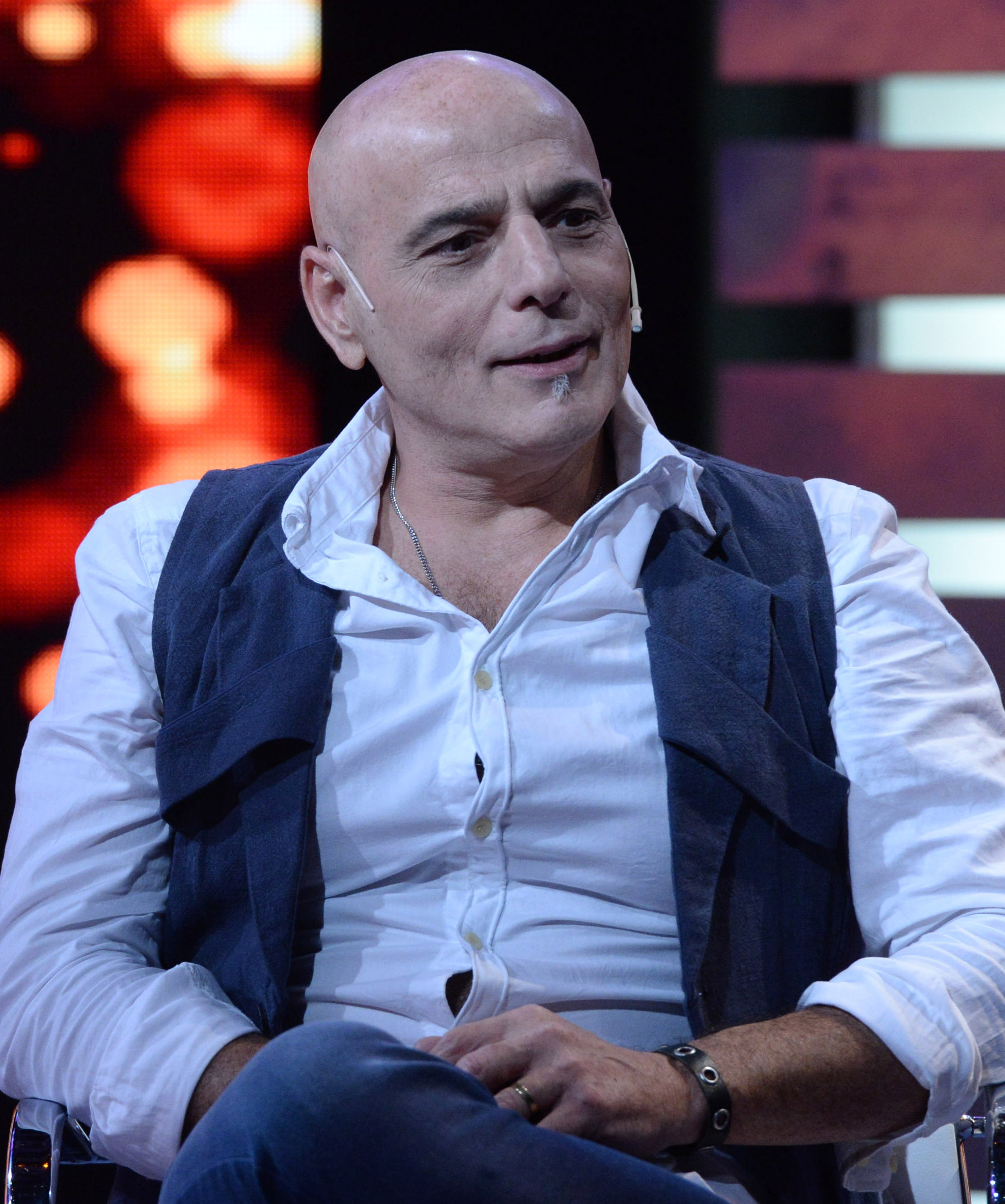
- Bosio in 2015

Background information
- Birth name: Hector Pedro Juan Bosio
- Also known as: Zeta Bosio
- Born: 1 October 1958 (age 66); San Fernando, Argentina
- Genres: Rock, alternative rock, electronic rock, new wave, pop rock, post-punk, neo-psychedelia experimental rock, electronic, dance
- Occupation(s): Musician, producer, DJ
- Instrument: Bass guitar
- Years active: 1982–present
- Member of: Shoot the Radio
- Formerly of: Soda Stereo, La Ley
- Website: zetabosio.net sodastereo.com

Héctor Juan Pedro Bosio (born 1 October 1958), known by his stage name Zeta Bosio, is an Argentine musician, record producer and DJ, best known as the bassist of the rock band Soda Stereo. He was also the bassist of Chilean band La Ley between 2013 and 2014. Nowadays he plays in the band Shoot the Radio, which he co-founded.

Bosio, along with Gustavo Cerati and Charly Alberti, formed Soda Stereo in 1982. They recorded over a dozen records until they disbanded in 1997. Since then, he kept a low profile until quite recently. ProyectoUnder.com is the music portal chosen by Bosio as a way to promote underground bands. Bosio is now working with his independent record label Alerta Discos. He has produced albums for bands such as "Aguirre" and "Peligrosos Gorriones". Also, he presented a TV show called "Rock Road" for Much Music Argentina and the Chilean channel Via X. In 2011, he was a judge in the Chilean TV show Factor X.

== Biography ==
Bosio began his contact with music at age 11, when he first heard The Beatles and became determined to learn to play bass guitar.

While at the school he formed two bands: "Water" and "La Banda de San Francisco." Later he joined the navy, and with his first paycheck bought a bass guitar in Puerto Rico. In the army he joined the orchestra and honed his musical skills:

"I played all kinds of music from salsa to Arabic songs."

When he returned to Buenos Aires, he studied advertising at the University of El Salvador. He was part of "The Morgan," a band that also included Sandra Baylac, Hugo Dop, Christian Hansen, Pablo Rodriguez, Charly Amato, Osvaldo Kaplan, Andres Calamaro, and eventually, Gustavo Cerati. They played on the student program "Happy Sunday" on Channel 9. The Morgan released a single, Perfume, a song originally by Rita Lee.

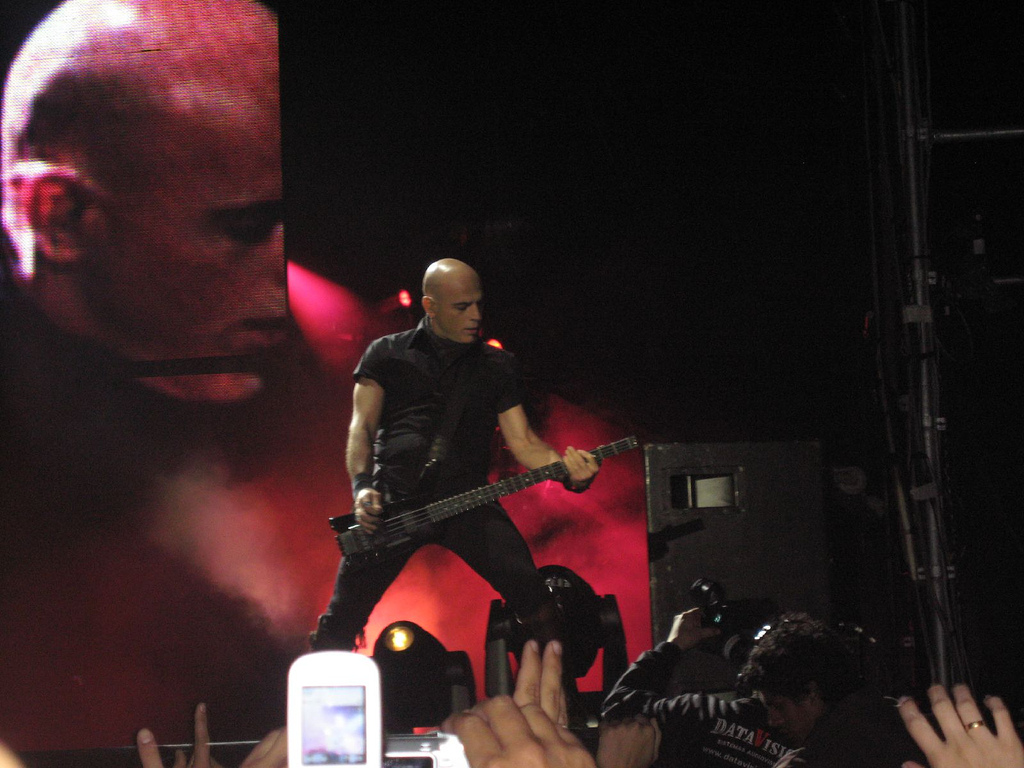
Bosio with Soda Stereo in 2007

In 1979, Zeta met Gustavo Cerati in college, but they did not become friends. During the summer of 1982, they met again at Punta del Este (Uruguay), Cerati with his group Sauvage and Bosio with The Morgan. Due to a series of adventures, Cerati and Bosio established a close musical bond and friendship which led them to play together.

Zeta and Gustavo shared the same musical tastes and dreams, and began a search for integrating a punk rock group inspired by The Police (who played the same year in Argentina), with their own songs in Spanish. Cerati first joined The Morgan and then formed a band called the Stress (along with Charlie Amato and drummer Pablo Guadalupe), then Erekto Project with Andres Calamaro. Shortly after Gustavo and Zeta decided to visit Charly Alberti (son of the famous percussionist Tito Alberti, who was four years younger than Bosio and three years younger than Cerati), to hear him play his father's drums. Soda Stereo was formed there, and debuted in July 1983.

In Soda Stereo, Zeta played the bass and sang backing vocals. He also played acoustic guitar and the chapman stick.

Soda Stereo was dissolved in September 1997 and subsequently Zeta worked with other groups, first through the web Under Project, then as manager of Sony Music Argentina, and in more recent years with Alert Discos.

In 2005, 2006 and 2007, Zeta hosted a TV show called Rock Road on the Argentine channel Much Music.

He was also bassist in the band invited Catupecu Machu Argentina, after the car accident suffered by Gabriel Ruiz Diaz.

In June 2007, Soda Stereo announced their comeback with a tour. Between October and December of that year, Zeta Bosio and Soda Stereo played throughout Latin America on a tour called Me Verás Volver.

In 2008, Zeta and his companions in Soda Stereo returned to their own projects after their brief reunion. In addition to hosting the show Keep Rockin on Radio Rock & Pop, Zeta toured as a DJ performing in various parts of Latin America in what were called Live Sessions. He has stated that he is fascinated by electronic music, dance and Dancefloor, and in addition to being a DJ, Zeta has plans to release a solo album with his mixes and compositions.

Zeta participated in the Lollapalooza festival, held for the first time outside the US, in Chile in April 2011.

In 2013, Zeta joined Chilean band La Ley as bassist.

== Production in Soda Stereo ==
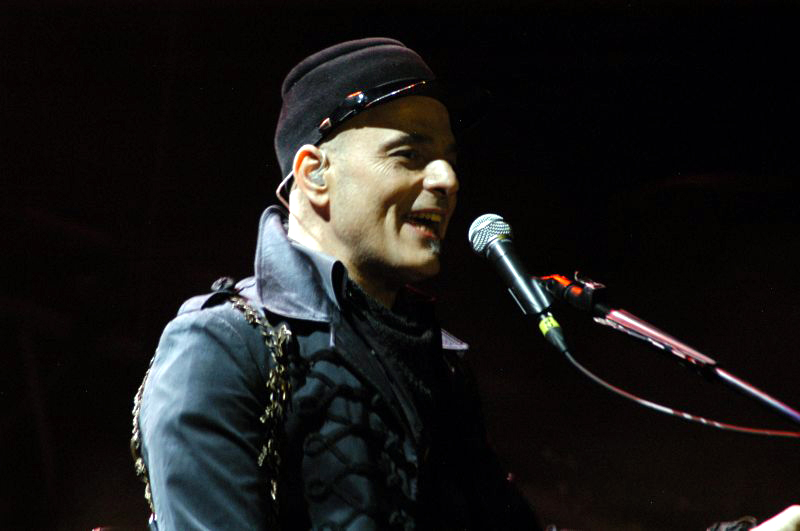
Bosio performing in 2007

Zeta Bosio participated in the musical production of the following albums:

- Nada Personal (1985) (with Gustavo Cerati, Charly Alberti and Gustavo Nolasco Lavalle)
- Signos (1986) (with Gustavo Cerati and Charly Alberti)
- Ruido Blanco (1987) (with Gustavo Cerati and Charly Alberti)
- Doble Vida (1988) (with Gustavo Cerati and Charly Alberti)
- Languis (1989) (with a Gustavo Cerati and Charly Alberti)
- Canción Animal (1990) (with Gustavo Cerati)
- Rex Mix (1991) (with Gustavo Cerati)
- Dynamo (1992) (with Gustavo Cerati)
- Zona de Promesas (1993) (with Gustavo Cerati)
- Sueño Stereo (1995) (with Gustavo Cerati)
