= Charly Alberti =

Argentinian drummer (born 1963)

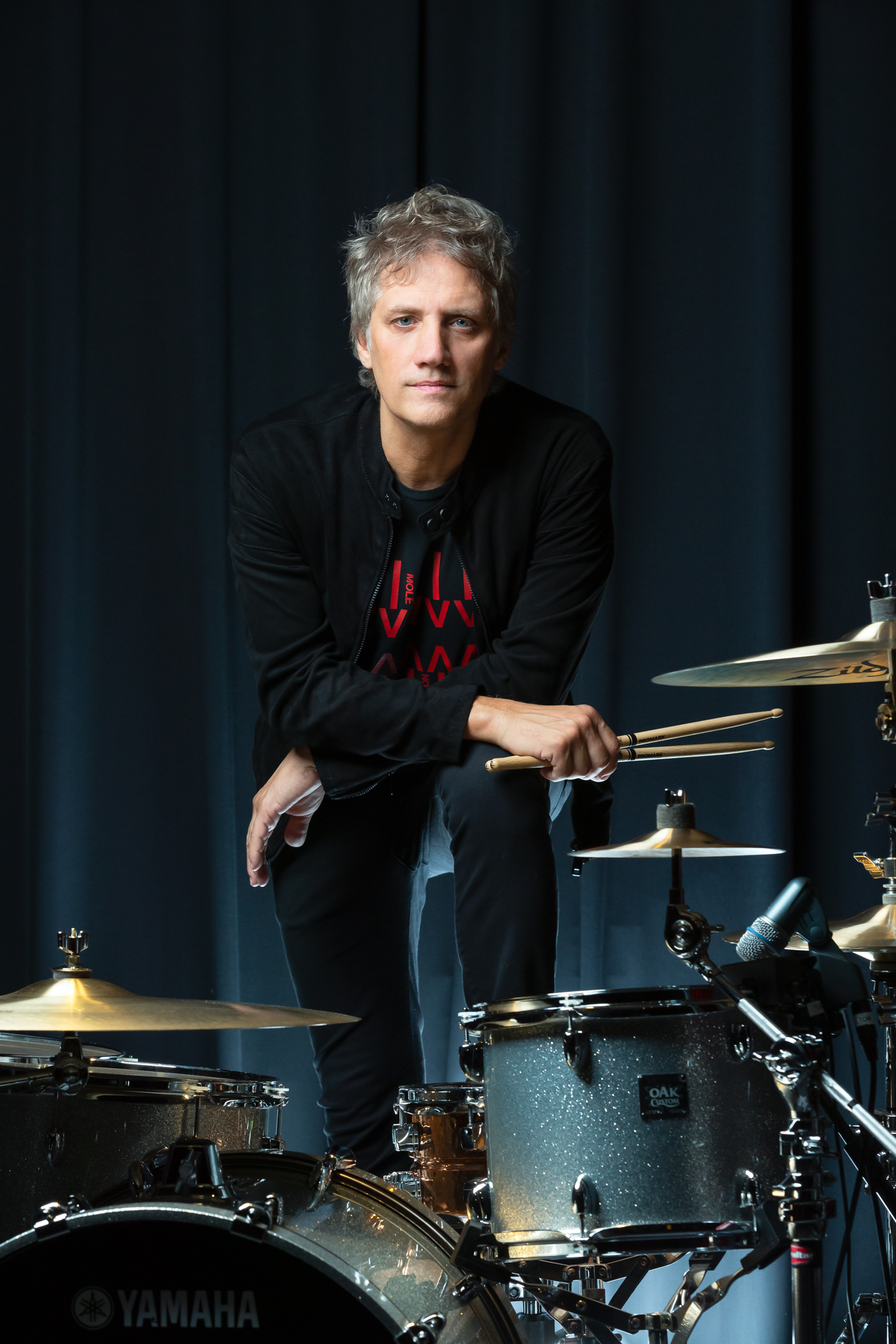
- Alberti in 2022

Background information
- Born: Carlos Alberto Ficicchia; 27 March 1963 (age 63); Buenos Aires, Argentina
- Genre: Rock
- Occupation: Drummer
- Years active: 1982–present
- Formerly of: Soda Stereo
- Website: charlyalberti.com

Charly Alberti (born Carlos Alberto Ficicchia; 27 March 1963) is an Argentine musician. He was the drummer for the rock band Soda Stereo, which was formed in 1982 and disbanded in 1997.

== Biography ==
Alberti was born on 27 March 1963 in Buenos Aires. He is the son of jazz musician and drummer Tito Alberti. He began studying music at the age of six.

Alberti met Gustavo Cerati, the future singer and guitarist of Soda Stereo, through Maria Laura Cerati, Gustavo's sister, who used to go to the River Plate sports club's pool. There Alberti played waterpolo and frequently talked to Maria Laura attempting to impress her. She told him that his brother was also interested in The Police and played the guitar. So he asked her to get in touch with Cerati.

In 1982, Alberti co-founded the Argentinian rock band Soda Stereo. In 1986, Remo Belli, the CEO of Remo, a musical instrument company, sponsored Alberti to use Remo drumheads.

In 1997, Alberti launched Cybrel Digital Entertainment, a content application company based on avant-garde technology.

In 1997, Soda Stereo disbanded after a final concert at River Plate Stadium in Buenos Aires. He was named an AppleMaster by Steve Jobs, co-founder of Apple. He became the only Spanish-speaking AppleMaster in its history. At the end of the same year, he launched URL Magazine, URL Records, and Yeyeye.com.

In 2003, MTV Latin America invited Charly Alberti, Ricky Martín, and Juanes to perform at MTV Video Music Awards Latinoamérica 2003. In 2005, he founded MOLE with his brother Andrés Alberti (lead guitars), and band members Ezequial Dasso (Chorus and Bass) and Sergio Bufi (Singer and 2nd guitar). In April 2007, MOLE released their first album, MOLE.

On 26 March 2008, MOLE won "Best Album by a New Rock Band" by Gardel Awards. In the same year, at the request of the Secretary of Tourism of the Nation, Alberti designed and directed the project "National Secretariat of Tourism of Argentina". The project won a prize at the Webby Awards. In 2009, he returned to the River Stadium, now with MOLE, to share the stage with the British band Oasis. In May 2009, he traveled to Nashville, Tennessee, to attend the Annual Meeting of Directors of The Climate Project Foundation (TCP), where he met with the former Vice President of the United States and Nobel Peace Prize laureate, Al Gore, who invited him to the project.

In 2015, Alberti represented his organization, R21, which focuses on promoting sustainability, at the Latin Alternative Music Conference (LAMC) in New York. Alberti made a call to action for environmental sustainability during the festival's annual show at Central Park SummerStage.

In 2017, he became a U.N. Development Program Goodwill Ambassador.

In 2019, after a year of preparation, Soda Stereo began an international tour that went across the continent called "Gracias Totales", to allow the public to see the band live one 'last time'. During their tour across the continent, Soda Stereo had "taken actions including planting 4,700 native trees to offset the carbon footprint", being one of the first Latin American tours to do so.

In 2022, Alberti partnered with Cerveza Quilmes and launched 27 Eazy, a beer brand that is made with malt produced from regenerative methods.

In 2023, during an interview with Andy Kusnetzoff through the radio program Perros de la Calle (Urbana Play), he revealed that he has Asperger's syndrome and is dyslexic, referring to himself as "a compilation".

On 23 September 2024, the UN Environment Programme (UNEP) elected Alberti as a Regional Goodwill Ambassador for The Caribbean and Latin America.

== Instruments ==
Since the beginning of his career, Charly has used Remo drumheads, Zildjian cymbals, Shure microphones, Gibraltar hardware, Roland Electronic Drums, and Pro-Mark drumsticks.

Since mid-2007, Charly Alberti has been playing a Yamaha drum, breaking his tradition of using brand Remo drums. Charly stated that Yamaha provided the rock sound, and Remo was spending more on drums for jazz; this decision was made in conjunction with Charly and Remo Belli, founder of Remo.
