= Gustavo Cerati discography =

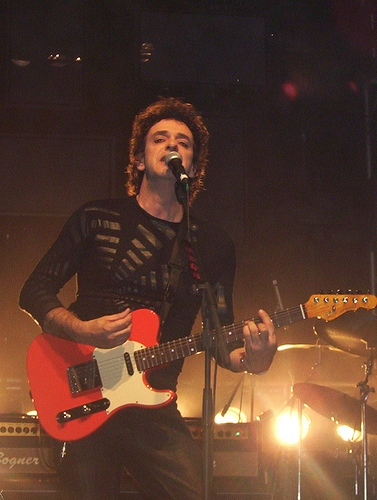
- Cerati live in Madrid in 2006
- Studio albums: 5
- Soundtrack albums: 2
- Live albums: 2
- Compilation albums: 2
- Tribute albums: 1
- Singles: 19
- Video albums: 4
- Music videos: 20
- Other appearances: 26

Gustavo Cerati (11 August 1959 – 4 September 2014) was a guitarist, singer, musician, composer and Argentine record producer of Latin rock. He began his career as the leader of the band Soda Stereo for after developing a solo career.

== Albums ==
=== Studio albums ===
Title	Details	Certifications
Amor Amarillo	Released: 1 November 1993; Label: Sony/BMG; Formats: CD	CAPIF: Platinum; RIAA: Gold (Latin)
Bocanada	Released: 28 June 1999; Label: Sony/BMG; Formats: Cassette, CD	CAPIF: Gold; AMPROFON: Gold; RIAA: Gold (Latin)
Siempre es hoy	Released: 26 November 2002; Label: Sony/BMG; Formats: Cassette, CD	CAPIF: Gold
Ahí vamos	Released: 4 April 2006; Label: Sony/BMG; Formats: CD	CAPIF: Platinum; IFPI Chile: Gold
Fuerza natural	Released: 1 September 2009; Label: Sony Music; Formats: CD, LP, digital download	CAPIF: Platinum; AMPROFON: Gold

=== Live albums ===
Title	Details
11 Episodios Sinfónicos	Released: 22 November 2001; Label: Sony/BMG; Formats: Cassette, CD
Fuerza Natural Tour, en vivo en Monterrey, MX, 2009	Released: 20 November 2019; Label: Sony/BMG; Formats: CD
14 Episodios Sinfónicos/En Vivo/Auditorio Nacional de México/Febrero 2002	Released: 11 August 2022; Label: Sony Music; Formats: CD, vinyl

=== Compilation albums ===
Title	Details
Canciones Elegidas 93–04	Released: 13 October 2004; Label: Sony/BMG; Formats: CD
Cerati Infinito	Released: 2 June 2015; Label: Sony Music Argentina; Formats: CD

=== Remix albums ===
- Reversiones: Siempre es Hoy (2003)

=== Soundtracks ===
- Sólo por hoy (1998)
- +Bien (2001)

== Singles ==
- "Raíz" (1999)
- "Puente" (1999)
- "La excepción" (2007)

== Collaborations ==
=== Other appearances ===
Year	Album	Artist	Details
1986	Consumación o Consumo	Fricción	Guitars, synthesizers
1988	Para Terminar	Fricción	Guitars, choirs and production
1988	Caifanes	Caifanes	Guitars ("La bestia humana")
1991	Cámara	Daniel Melero	Bass, guitar and voice
1992	Pasto	Babasónicos	Guitar
1992	Aguirre	Aguirre	Guitar ("Terror de Mi Vida")
1992	L7D	Los 7 Delfines	Producer
1997	Sueños en tránsito	Nicole	Producer / Composer ("Lunas")
1999	Cazuela	Francisco Bochatón	Guitars
2000	Mar	Leo García	Productor
2000	Outlandos D'Americas – Tributo A Police	Various Artists	Guitars and voices ("Tráeme La Noche (Bring on the Night)")
2000	Andrea Álvarez	Andrea Álvarez	Guitars
2001	Pr3ssion	Pr3ssion	Voice ("Parte de las reglas")
2001	Si - Detrás de las paredes	Sui Generis	Voice and guitar ("Rasguña las piedras")
2001	Manzana de metal	Altocamet	Productor
2003	Aventura – Out Mixes	Los 7 Delfines	Producer
2004	Fan	Fernando Samalea	Guitars
2005	Fijación oral vol. 1	Shakira	Guitars ("Día especial" and "No") / Composer ("Día especial")
2005	Oral Fixation, Vol. 2	Shakira	Co-producer, cocompositor and guitar ("The Day and the Time")
2005	Homenaje a Los Beatles	Los Durabeat	Voice ("I'm losing you")
2005	Cuarto creciente	Leo García	Guitars ("Cuarto creciente") y ("Tesoro"), Mutador ("Los álamos"), Claptomat and laptop sounds ("No volvimos a vernos") and ("Mi sentir")
	Inconsciente colectivo	Fabiana Cantilo	Voice ("Eiti Leda")
2006	Cassette	Telefunka	Voice ("Electroshock")
2007	El rock es mi forma de ser (Volumen 1)	Alina Gandini & Hotelera	Voice ("Jet Set")
2007	Mar dulce	Bajofondo	Voice ("El mareo")
2007	Mordisco	Emmanuel Horvilleur	Voice ("19")
2007	D-mente	D-mente	Voice ("Sueño en gotas") Acoustic Bonus track
2008	Avión	No lo soporto	Voice ("Nunca iré")
2009	Cantora	Mercedes Sosa	Voice ("Zona De Promesas")
2010	Sale el sol	Shakira	Co-producer and composer ("Devoción" and "Tu boca") / Guitar ("Mariposas")

== Videography ==
=== DVD ===
- 11 episodios sinfónicos (2003)
- Canciones elegidas 93-04 (2004)
- Gustavo Cerati: Ahí Vamos Tour (2007)
- Gustavo Cerati en Monterrey (2019)

=== Music videos ===
- 1993: "Te llevo para que me lleves" (Directed by: Daniel Bohm & Pablo Fischerman)
- 1993: "Pulsar" (Directed by: Gabriela Malerba & Alejandro Ros)
- 1994: "Lisa" (Directed by: Ariel Guelferbein)
- 1999: "Puente" (Directed by: Andy Fogwill)
- 1999: "Paseo inmoral" (Directed by: Gustavo Cerati & Picky Talarico)
- 2000: "Tabú" (Directed by: Stanley)
- 2000: "Engaña" (Directed by: Cecilia Amenábar & Eduardo Capilla)
- 2000: "Río Babel (Directed by: Emiliano López)
- 2001: "Persiana americana" (Directed by: Diego Sáenz)
- 2001: "Corazón delator" (Directed by: Diego Sáenz)
- 2002: "Cosas imposibles" (Directed by: Diego Kaplan & Juan Antín)
- 2003: "Karaoke" (Directed by: Sebastian Sánchez)
- 2003: "Artefacto" (Directed by: Germán Sáez)
- 2006: "Crimen" (Directed by: Joaquín Cambre)
- 2006: "La excepción" (Directed by: Ezequiel de San Pablo, Jorge Jaramillo & Antonio Balseiro)
- 2007: "Adiós" (Directed by: Joaquín Cambre)
- 2007: "Lago en el cielo" (Directed by: Andy Fogwill)
- 2008: "Me quedo aquí" (Directed by: Oscar Fernández + Reino and Landia)
- 2009: "Déjà vu" (Directed by: Andy Fogwill, Maxi Blanco & Summer)
- 2009: "Rapto" (Directed by: Andy Fogwill, Maxi Blanco & Summer)
- 2021: "No te creo" (Filmed in 2004) (Directed by: Nicolás Bernaudo, Diego Panich & Lemon)

== Other projects ==
=== Cerati/Melero ===
- Colores santos (1992)
- Colores santos: The Remixes (1995)

=== Plan V ===
- Plan V (1996)
- Plan V + Black Dog (1998) – EP with The Black Dog

=== Cerati/Andy Summers ===
- Outlandos D'Americas: A Rock en Español Tribute to the Police (1998)

=== Ocio ===
- Medida universal (1999)
- Insular EP (2000)
