= Premio Gardel for Album of the Year =

Annual Argentine music award

- Awarded for: Albums
- Country: Argentina
- Presented by: Argentine Chamber of Phonograms and Videograms Producers
- First award: 1999
- Currently held by: Bien o Mal by Trueno

Highlights
- Most wins: Abel Pintos (3); Charly García (3)
- Most nominations: Babasónicos (8)
- Website: Official website

The Premio Gardel for Album of the Year is an award given to the best Argentine albums recorded during the previous year within the scope of the Premios Gardel, a ceremony established in 1999 and originally known as the Carlos Gardel Awards. It is awarded in an annual celebration of Argentine music organized by the Argentine Chamber of Phonograms and Videograms Producers (CAPIF), and "includes albums corresponding to solo artists, duos or groups, vocal or instrumental that were nominated in the categories".

The winning album receives the Gardel de Oro award, a golden version of the trophy. Initially, the Album of the Year category and the Gardel de Oro distinction were awarded separately. Later, since the 2003 edition, the golden version of the trophy is awarded to the winner of the album of the year. Until then, it was awarded by a specialized jury for the musical excellence of the artist, but since that year journalists from all musical genres, producers, musicians and specialists participate by voting in the election of the winner, for which they take as a point of evaluation the album.

== Recipients ==
Year	Winner(s)	Album	Nominees	Ref.
1999	Mercedes Sosa	Al despertar	Alejandro Lerner – Volver a empezar; Marcela Morelo – Manantial; Soledad Pastorutti – La Sole	
2000	Los Nocheros	Signos	Fito Páez – Abre; Gustavo Cerati – Bocanada; Andrés Calamaro – Honestidad brutal; Los Fabulosos Cadillacs – La marcha del golazo solitario	
2001	Divididos	Narigón del siglo	Los Pericos – 1000 vivos; Rodrigo – A 2000; Sui Generis – Sinfonías para adolescentes	
2002	Diego Torres	Un Mundo Diferente	León Gieco – Bandidos rurales; Alfredo Casero – Casaerius; Babasónicos – Jessico; Marcelo Galliano – Sueños de una noche de guitarra	
2003	Charly García	Influencia	Divididos – Vengo del placard de otro; Gustavo Cerati – Siempre es hoy; Los Pericos – Desde cero; Vicentico – Vicentico	
2004	Babasónicos	Infame	Alejandro Lerner – Buen viaje; Divididos – Vivo acá	
2005	Bersuit Vergarabat	La Argentinidad al Palo	Árbol – Guau!; Catupecu Machu – El número imperfecto; Diego Torres – MTV Unplugged; Vicentico – Los rayos	
2006	Andrés Calamaro	El regreso	Babasónicos – Anoche; Bersuit Vergarabat – Testosterona; Fabiana Cantilo – Inconsciente colectivo; Jorge Rojas – La vida; León Gieco – Por favor, perdón y gracias	
2007	Gustavo Cerati	Ahí vamos	Andrés Calamaro – El palacio de las flores; David Bolzoni – David Bolzoni; Diego Torres – Andando; Los Palmeras – El bombón asesino	
2008	Andrés Calamaro	La lengua popular	Los Piojos – Civilización; Catupecu Machu – Laberintos entre aristas y dialectos; Massacre – El Mamut; Bajofondo – Mar dulce	
2009	Luis Alberto Spinetta	Un mañana	Babasónicos – Mucho; Axel – Universo; Los Fabulosos Cadillacs – La luz del ritmo; Pedro Aznar – Quebrado	
2010	Gustavo Cerati	Fuerza natural	Axel – Todo mi universo; Mercedes Sosa – Cantora	
2011	Divididos	Amapola del 66	Vicentico – Solo un momento; Abel Pintos – Reevolución	
2012	Escalandrum	Piazzolla Plays Piazzolla	Miranda! – Magistral; Nadia Szachniuk and Eva Sola – Vidala; Babasónicos – A propósito	
2013	Abel Pintos	Sueño dorado	Vicentico – 5; Illya Kuryaki and the Valderramas – Chances; Andrés Ciro Martínez – 27; Luciano Pereyra – Con alma de pueblo	
2014	Abel Pintos	Abel	Andrés Calamaro – Bohemio; Tan Biónica – Destinología; Babasónicos – Romantisísmico; Fernando Samalea – Samalea a todas partes	
2015	Axel	Tus ojos, mis ojos	Las Pelotas – 5x5; Miranda! – Safari; Gabo Ferro and Luciana Jury – El veneno de los milagros	
2016	Luis Alberto Spinetta	Los amigo	Diego Torres – Buena Vida; Luciano Pereyra – Tu mano	
2017	Abel Pintos	11	Elena Roger and Escalandrum – 3001 Proyecto Piazzolla; Ciro y los Persas – Naranja persa	
2018	Charly García	Random	Luciano Pereyra – La vida al viento; Axel – Ser	
2019	Marilina Bertoldi	Prender un fuego	Andrés Calamaro – Cargar la suerte; Los Auténticos Decadentes – Fiesta Nacional MTV Unplugged; Escalandrum – Studio 2; Babasónicos – Discutible	
2020	David Lebón	Lebón & Co.	Wos – Caravana; Conociendo Rusia – Cabildo y Juramento; Paulo Londra – Homerun; Eruca Sativa – Seremos primavera; Él Mató a un Policía Motorizado – La otra dimensión; Sig Ragga – Relatos de la Luna; Pedro Aznar and Ramiro Gallo – Utopía	
2021	Fito Páez	La conquista del espacio	Nathy Peluso – Calambre; Luis Alberto Spinetta – Ya no mires atrás	
2022	Wos	Oscuro éxtasis	Escalandrum – 100; Ca7riel – El disko; Nicki Nicole – Parte de Mí; Abel Pintos – El amor en mi vida; Andrés Calamaro – Dios los cría	
2023	Trueno	Bien o mal	Ciro y los Persas with Orquesta Filarmónica de Mendoza – Sueños (Un viaje en el tiempo); María Becerra – La Nena de Argentina; Babasónicos – Trinchera avanzada; Dante Spinetta – Mesa dulce	
