= Premios Gardel =

Argentine award for achievements in music

Premios Gardel a la Música
- Current: 28th Annual Premios Gardel
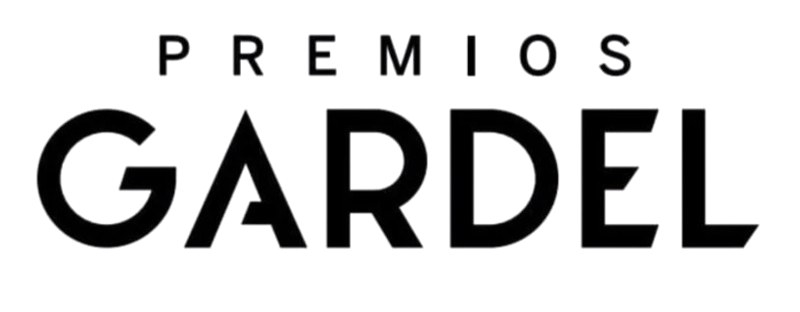
- Awarded for: Outstanding achievements in the Argentine record industry market
- Country: Argentina
- Presented by: CAPIF
- First award: 1999
- Website: Premios Gardel

The Premios Gardel a la Música (originally called Premios Carlos Gardel), or just Premios Gardel (in English, the Gardel Awards), is an award presented by the Argentine Chamber of Phonograms and Videograms Producers (CAPIF) to recognize the best of Argentine music and to award the talent of Argentine artists in a diversity of genres and categories. The trophy depicts a sculpture of French Argentine tango singer Carlos Gardel, one of Argentina's music icons. The annual presentation ceremony features performances by prominent artists, and the presentation of awards that have more popular interest.

The honorees are chosen by a jury consisting of musicians, journalists and other members of the media, event producers, sound engineers, and personalities related to music. The awards are the Argentine equivalent to the American Grammy Awards and the British BRIT Awards. The Premios Gardel have been described as the "most important prize in the country's music business".

== History ==
After the ACE Awards (1992–1997) failed to become Argentina's standard music awards due to lack of support from the industry, the Gardel Awards appeared to take over that spot.

The awards are named after Carlos Gardel, one of Argentina's earliest and most well-known popular music performers. The awards were organized by CAPIF with the first ceremony held in 1999 for music released between June 1, 1997, and November 30, 1998. The jury for the first awards comprised 500 members.

In 2003, the voting committee was made "truly independent from the record companies, whose staffs can no longer vote," according to then-CAPIF executive director, Gabriel Salcedo. The jury increased to 1,500 members, including artists, producers, and journalists of "every musical genre". In the past, the Gardels were viewed as a "pat on the back" from the industry to its favorite, best-selling artists, but the revamped voting was viewed as giving transparency to the selection process and a new-found credibility to the awards themselves.

== Ceremonies ==
No.	Year	Date	Gardel de Oro	Host(s)	Venue	Broadcast	Ref.
1	1999	14 April	Sandro	Jorge Guinzburg	Teatro Coliseo, Buenos Aires	El Trece	
2	2000	24 April	Mercedes Sosa	Dady Brieva	Teatro Gran Rex, Buenos Aires	El Trece	
3	2001	31 March	León Gieco	Marcos Mundstock	Luna Park Arena, Buenos Aires	El Trece	
4	2002	16 April	Charly García	Roberto Pettinato	Teatro Opera, Buenos Aires	El Trece	
5	2003	17 March	Charly García	Roberto Pettinato	Luna Park Arena, Buenos Aires	El Trece	
6	2004	31 March	Babasónicos	Roberto Pettinato	Teatro Gran Rex, Buenos Aires	El Trece	
7	2005	13 April	Bersuit Vergarabat	Roberto Pettinato	Teatro Gran Rex, Buenos Aires	Telefe	
8	2006	5 April	Andrés Calamaro	Manuel Wirzt and Hilda Lizarazu	Teatro Gran Rex, Buenos Aires	Telefe	
9	2007	17 April	Gustavo Cerati	Roberto Pettinato	Luna Park Arena, Buenos Aires	El Trece	
10	2008	26 March	Andrés Calamaro	Bebe Contemponi	Teatro Gran Rex, Buenos Aires	El Trece	
11	2009	22 July	Luis Alberto Spinetta	None (Note: The 11th Annual Gardel Awards ceremony could not be held due to the 2009 swine flu pandemic. Winners were announced on the morning of 22 July 2009, with trophies being sent to them.)			
12	2010	4 November	Gustavo Cerati	None (Note: The 12th Annual Gardel Awards ceremony was not held. Winners were announced on 4 November 2010.)			
13	2011	30 November	Divididos	None (Note: The 13th Annual Gardel Awards ceremony was not held. Winners were announced on 30 November 2011.)			
14	2012	8 November	Escalandrum	Soledad and Bahiano	Usina del Arte, Buenos Aires	CM	
15	2013	21 August	Abel Pintos	Deborah de Corral and Mex Urtizberea	Teatro Opera, Buenos Aires	C5N	
16	2014	4 September	Abel Pintos	Roberto Pettinato and Sandra Mihanovich	Teatro Gran Rex, Buenos Aires	C5N	
17	2015	2 June	Axel	Roberto Pettinato and Catarina Spinetta	Teatro Gran Rex, Buenos Aires	TN	
18	2016	7 June	Luis Alberto Spinetta	Lalo Mir	Teatro Gran Rex, Buenos Aires	TN	
19	2017	6 June	Abel Pintos	Lalo Mir and Maju Lozano	Teatro Gran Rex, Buenos Aires	TN	
20	2018	29 May	Charly García	Germán Paoloski	Kirchner Cultural Centre, Buenos Aires	TVP	
21	2019	14 May	Marilina Bertoldi	Iván de Pineda	Ángel Bustelo Auditorium, Mendoza	TNT	
22	2020	18 September	David Lebón	Ale Sergi and Natalie Perez	None (Note: The 22nd Annual Gardel Awards ceremony was held virtually due to the COVID-19 pandemic. Ale Sergi and Natalie Perez hosted the event live from a studio in Buenos Aires, while winners, presenters and performers were shown from their homes or recording studios.)	TNT	
23	2021	23 July	Fito Páez	Jey Mammón and Eleonora Pérez Caressi	None (Note: The 23d Annual Gardel Awards ceremony was held virtually due to the COVID-19 pandemic.)	TNT	
24	2022	23 August	Wos	Jey Mammón and Eleonora Pérez Caressi	Movistar Arena, Buenos Aires	Star+	
25	2023	16 May	Trueno	Iván de Pineda	Movistar Arena, Buenos Aires	Star+	
26	2024	28 May	Miranda!	Iván de Pineda	Movistar Arena, Buenos Aires	Star+	
27	2025	18 June	Ca7riel & Paco Amoroso	Gabriela Radice	Teatro Coliseo, Buenos Aires	HBO Max; TNT	
28	2026	26 May	Milo J	Diego Leuco	Teatro Coliseo, Buenos Aires	HBO Max; TNT	

Footnotes:

== Categories ==
The Gardel Awards are awarded in a series of categories, each of which isolate a specific contribution to the recording industry. The standard awards list nominees in each category from which a winner is selected. Twenty-four Gardel Awards were awarded in the first award ceremony, but the number of awards has grown and fluctuated over time as new categories are added and some older ones removed. As of 2022, the number of categories is forty-eight.

=== General Field ===
The General Field are standard awards for musical works which do not restrict nominees by genre or some other criterion:

- Album of the Year is awarded to the performer(s) of a full vocal or instrumental album. The winner of this category receives the Gardel de Oro Award, a golden version of the trophy and the Awards' greatest distinction.
- Song of the Year is awarded to the performer(s), songwriter(s) and composer(s) of the song.
- Record of the Year is awarded to the performer(s), producer(s) and recording engineer(s) of a full album. Formerly known as Production of the Year, it also allows songs to be nominated since 2020.
- Best New Artist is awarded to the performer of a full album or song who has not released more than two albums or twenty songs. From 2007 to 2018 (except in 2010), the category was replaced genre-specific versions for pop, rock, tango, folklore, tropical and cuarteto.
- Best Collaboration is awarded to the performers, songwriter(s) and composer(s) of the song. It is awarded since 2020.

=== Winners ===
No.	Year	Album of the Year (Gardel de Oro) (Note: The Album of the Year and Gardel de Oro were different categories until they were merged in 2003. Since then, winning the Album of the Year award is equivalent to winning the Gardel de Oro award.)	Song of the Year	Record of the Year (Note: Formerly known as Production of the Year.) (Note: The category awarded albums exclusively until 2019. In 2020, songs started to be allowed. In 2022, it was made a song-exclusive category.)	Best New Artist(s) (Note: In the years 2007-2009 and 2011-2018, specific genre categories were introduced for the Best New Artist award. However, they were re-merged into a single category starting from the 2019 ceremony. The names for Best New Artist on this chart stand for Best New Pop Artist.)	Ref.
1	1999	Al Despertar (Mercedes Sosa)	"Volver a empezar" (Alejandro Lerner)	Volver a Empezar (Alejandro Lerner)	Marcela Morelo	
2	2000	Signos (Los Nocheros)	"Campeones de la Vida" (Alejandro Lerner)	La Marcha del Golazo Solitario (Los Fabulosos Cadillacs)	Laura Miller	
3	2001	Narigón del Siglo (Divididos)	"Soy Cordobés" (Rodrigo)	Narigón del Siglo (Divididos)	Roxana Carabajal	
4	2002	Un Mundo Diferente (Diego Torres)	"Shima Uta" (Alfredo Casero)	Casaerius (Alfredo Casero)	Alfredo Casero	
5	2003	Influencia (Charly García)	"Tu Vicio" (Charly García)	Influencia (Charly García)	Mambrú	
6	2004	Infame (Babasónicos)	"Irresponsables" (Babasónicos)	Infame (Babasónicos)	Emme	
7	2005	La Argentinidad al Palo (Bersuit Vergarabat)	"Los Caminos de la Vida" (Vicentico)	MTV Unplugged (Diego Torres)	Juana Molina	
8	2006	El Regreso (album) (Andrés Calamaro)	"El Ángel de la Bicicleta" (León Gieco)	Café de los Maestros Vol. 1 y 2 (Gustavo Santaolalla)	Migue García	
9	2007	Ahí vamos (Gustavo Cerati)	"Crimen" (Gustavo Cerati)	Ahí vamos (Gustavo Cerati)	David Bolzoni	
10	2008	La Lengua Popular (Andrés Calamaro)	"5 Minutos Más" (Andrés Calamaro)	Laberintos entre aristas y dialectos (Catupecu Machu)	Ella Es Tan Cargosa	
11	2009	Un mañana (Luis Alberto Spinetta)	"Mi elemento" (Luis Alberto Spinetta)	Quebrado (Pedro Aznar)	Romina Vitale	
12	2010	Fuerza natural (Gustavo Cerati)	"Déjà vu" (Gustavo Cerati)	Fuerza natural (Gustavo Cerati)	De Bueyes	
13	2011	Amapola del 66 (Divididos)	"Sólo Un Momento" (Vicentico)	Amapola del 66 (Divididos)	Tan Biónica	
14	2012	Piazzolla Plays Piazzolla (Escalandrum)	"Paisaje" (Vicentico)	Piazzolla Plays Piazzolla (Escalandrum)	Deborah de Corral	
15	2013	Sueño Dorado (Abel Pintos)	"Sueño Dorado" (Abel Pintos)	Chances (Illya Kuryaki and the Valderramas)	Rosario Ortega	
16	2014	Abel (Abel Pintos)	"Aquí Te Espero" (Abel Pintos)	Abel (Abel Pintos)	Indios	
17	2015	Tus Ojos, Mis Ojos (Axel)	"Afinidad" (Axel)	Tus Ojos, Mis Ojos (Axel)	Lali	
18	2016	Los Amigo (Luis Alberto Spinetta)	"Antes y Después" (Ciro y los Persas)	Único (Abel Pintos)	Julieta Rada	
19	2017	11 (Abel Pintos)	"Cómo Te Extraño" (Abel Pintos)	Barro y Fauna (Eruca Sativa)	Benjamín Amadeo	
20	2018	Random (Charly García)	"Aire" (Axel)	Random (Charly García)	J Mena	
21	2019	Prender Un Fuego (Marilina Bertoldi)	"Sin Querer Queriendo" (Lali featuring Mau y Ricky)	Studio 2 (Escalandrum)	Destino San Javier	
22	2020	Lebón & Co. (David Lebón)	"Canguro" (Wos)	Lebón & Co. (David Lebón)	Wos	
23	2021	La Conquista del Espacio (Fito Páez)	"Ladrón" (Lali and Cazzu)	Calambre (Nathy Peluso)	Nathy Peluso	
24	2022	Oscuro Éxtasis (Wos)	"Miénteme" (Tini and María Becerra)	"Mafiosa" (Nathy Peluso)	Tiago PZK	
25	2023	Bien o Mal (Trueno)	"La Triple T" (Tini)	"Argentina" (Trueno and Nathy Peluso)	Noelia Recalde	
26	2024	Hotel Miranda! (Miranda!)	"Obsesión" (Lali)	"La Rueda Mágica" (Note: Subtitled "EADDA9223".) (Fito Páez featuring Andrés Calamaro and Conociendo Rusia)	Milo J	
27	2025	Baño María (Ca7riel & Paco Amoroso)	"Fanático" (Lali)	"Real Gangsta Love" (Trueno)	Olivia Wald	
28	2026	La Vida Era Más Corta (Milo J)	"Niño" (Milo J)	"Niño" (Milo J)	Blair	

Footnotes:

=== Genre-specific categories ===
As of the 2026 ceremony, there are 53 categories, including the General Field.

Pop

- Best Pop Album (since 2020)
- Best Pop Song (since 2022)
- Best Pop Group Album
- Best Alternative Pop Album (since 2019)
- Best Contemporary Romantic Music Album (since 2026)

Pop/Rock

- Best Pop/Rock Album (since 2026)
- Best Pop/Rock Song (since 2026)

Rock

- Best Rock Album (1999–2001, 2003–2005, 2016–2017, 2020–)
- Best Rock Song (since 2022)
- Best Rock Group Album
- Best Alternative Rock Album (since 2019)
- Best Hard Rock Album (since 2026)

Dance/Electronic

- Best Electronic Music Album (since 2018)

Folk

- Best Folklore Album (1999, 2020–)
- Best Folklore Song (since 2022)
- Best Folklore Group Album (since 2000)
- Best Alternative Folklore Album (since 2008)

Tango

- Best Tango Album (1999–2001, 2003, 2020–)
- Best Tango Song (since 2022)
- Best Instrumental Tango Orchestra Album (2000–2003, 2005–)

Tropical/Cuarteto

- Best Tropical Album (since 2025)
- Best Tropical Song (since 2025)
- Best Tropical Group Album (since 2025)
- Best Cuarteto Album (2003–2009, 2012–)
- Best Cuarteto Song (since 2022)

Classical

- Best Classical Album (since 2001)

Jazz

- Best Jazz Album (since 2003)

Instrumental/Fusion/World Music

- Best Instrumental Album (2007–2008, 2026)
- Best Global Music Album (since 2026)

Urban/Reggae

- Best Urban Album (since 2022)
- Best Urban Song (since 2022)
- Best Urban Collaboration (since 2022)
- Best Reggae/Ska Album (since 2019)
- Best Hip-Hop/Rap Album (since 2026)
- Best Hip-Hop/Rap Song (since 2026)

Live

- Best Live Album (since 2020)
- Best Live Song (since 2026)

Singer-Songwriter

- Best Singer-Songwriter Album (since 2004)
- Best Singer-Songwriter Song (since 2026)

Children's, Visual Media & Music Video/Film

- Best Children's Album
- Best Cinema/Television Soundtrack Album (since 2007)
- Best Short Form Music Video (1999, 2001–)
- Best Long Form Music Video (since 2005)

Technical

- Producer of the Year (1999–2004, 2020–)
- Best Engineered Album (since 2005)

Package, Concept & Historical

- Best Catalog Collection Album (since 2007)
- Best Concept Album (since 2008)
- Best Album Artwork (since 2026)

=== No longer awarded ===
Pop

- Best Female Pop Album (1999–2019)
- Best Male Pop Album (1999–2019)
- Best New Pop Artist (2007–2009, 2011–2018)
- Best Romantic/Melodic Album (2003–2023)
- Best Traditional Pop Album (2024–2025)
- Best Urban Pop Album (since 2024–2025)
- Best Urban Pop Song (since 2024–2025)

Pop/Rock

- Best Alternative Rock/Pop Album (2009–2018)

Rock

- Best Female Rock Album (2002, 2006, 2017–2019)
- Best Male Rock Album (2002, 2006, 2017–2019)
- Best New Rock Artist (2007–2009, 2011–2018)
- Best Hard Rock/Punk Album (2014–2025)

Dance/Electronic

- Best Dance/Electronic Album (2003–2007)
- Best Electronic Tango Album (2008–2009)
- Best Remix Album (2008–2009)

Folk

- Best Female Folklore Album (2000–2019)
- Best Male Folklore Album (2000–2019)
- Best New Folklore Artist (2007–2009, 2011–2016, 2018)
- Best Chamamé Album (2015–2024)

Tango

- Best Female Tango Album (2002, 2004–2019)
- Best Male Tango Album (2002, 2004–2019)
- Best New Rock Artist (2007–2009, 2011–2018)
- Best Nuevas Formas Tango Album (2004–2006)
- Best Alternative Tango Album (2011–2017)

Urban/Reggae

- Best Urban/Reggae Album (2012–2018)
- Best Urban/Trap Song or Album (2019–2021)
- Best Urban/Trap Collaboration (2019–2021)
- Best RKT Song (in 2025 only)

Instrumental/Fusion/World Music

- Best Instrumental/Fusion/World Music Album (2010–2025)
- Best Instrumental/Fusion Album (in 2009 only)

Tropical/Cuarteto

- Best Female Tropical Album (2001–2003, 2007–2010, 2012–2019)
- Best Male Tropical Album (2001–2003, 2007–2010, 2012–2019)
- Best Tropical Group Album (2003–2010, 2012–2024)
- Best Tropical Album (2004–2006, 2020–2024)
- Best New Tropical Artist (2002–2003, 2007–2009)
- Best New Cuarteto Artist (in 2012 only)
- Best New Tropical/Cuarteto Artist (2006–2009, 2011)
- Best Female Tropical/Cuarteto Album (in 2011 only)
- Best Male Tropical/Cuarteto Album (in 2011 only)
- Best Cuarteto Group Album (2012–2024)
- Best Tropical/Cuarteto Group Album (in 2011 only)
- Best Tropical/Bailanta Album (in 1999 only)
- Best Female Tropical/Bailanta Album (in 2000 only)
- Best Male Tropical/Bailanta Album (in 2000 only)
- Best Tropical/Bailanta Group Album (1999–2000)
- Best Tropical Song (2022–2024)

Christian music

- Best Christian Album (2008–2012)

Performance

- Performance of the Year (2006–2007)

Adult Contemporary

- Best Adult Contemporary Artist or Group (2002–2003)

Latin

- Latin Album of the Year (1999–2002)
- Best Female Latin Album (1999–2002)
- Best Male Latin Album (1999–2002)
- Best Latin Pop Group Album (1999–2002)
- Best Latin RockGroup Album (1999–2002)
- Best New Latin Artist (1999–2002)
- Best Mercosur Artist Album (in 1999 only)

Package, Concept & Historical

- Best Cover Design (2000–2025)

Children's, Visual Media & Music Video/Film

- Best Music Video Director (1999–2000)

== Voting process ==
The voting process begins every year with media companies entering albums, songs and music videos for consideration. Entries are made online. Once the postulation date expires and all entries have been registered in the differed categories, CAPIF summons the Revision Committees, work groups consisting of journalists, producers, musicians and specialist that revise the entries to revise that the entries have been registered in the right category according to its music genre and particular characteristics. Once it has been revised, the selection of nominees begins.

For selecting the nominees, CAPIF informs the jury of the Gardel Awards that the first stage of the voting process is open for each category. Members of the jury can access online to the audio and video contents that habe been submitted for nomination and choose those that consider should be nominated. Once this stage of the voting process finishes, CAPIF publishes the official list of nominees.

After the list of nominees has been defined, the voting members must select one winner for each category. This is also made online. Lastly, CAPIF informs the winners in the pre-telecast ceremony and the official awards show ceremony.

== See also ==
- 19th Annual Premios Gardel
- 21st Annual Premios Gardel
- 23rd Annual Premios Gardel
