= 11 Episodios Sinfónicos =

Live album by Gustavo Cerati
- Released: 22 November 2001
- Recorded: August 2001
- Genres: Symphonic rock, orchestral
- Length: 57:53
- Label: BMG International
- Producer: Diego Sáenz

Gustavo Cerati chronology
+ bien (2001)	11 Episodios Sinfónicos (2001)	Siempre es Hoy (2002)

11 Episodios Sinfónicos (11 Symphonic Episodes) is a live album recorded by Gustavo Cerati at the Teatro Avenida of Buenos Aires in August 2001. Following the footsteps of other important artists, Cerati rearranged eleven tracks from both his former band Soda Stereo and his solo albums into symphonic melodies. The concert consisted of him singing while the orchestra played along while being directed by Alejandro Terán. A DVD was also released which featured four additional songs not included in the CD, as well as behind-the-scenes extras and a documentary.

== Reception ==
The Allmusic review by Drago Bonacich awarded the album 4 stars stating "The album brings a collection of greatest hits with well-crafted arrangements and sophisticated sounds, mostly delivered by violins and violoncellos. In addition, Cerati's seductive voice allows listeners to establish a captivating connection between rock en español and classical music.".

Professional ratings
Review scores
Source	Rating
Allmusic	4/5 stars

== CD track listing ==
1. "Canción Animal" (Animal Song) – 5:32 (originally from Canción Animal, 1990)
2. "Bocanada" (Mouthful) – 4:01 (originally from Bocanada, 1999)
3. "Corazón Delator" (Tell-Tale Heart) – 6:22 (originally from Doble Vida, 1988)
4. "El Rito" (The Rite) – 6:51 (originally from Signos, 1986)
5. "A Merced" (At Mercy) – 2:33 (originally from Amor Amarillo, 1993)
6. "Raiz" (Root) – 4:12 (originally from Bocanada, 1999)
7. "Sweet Sahumerio" – 6:40 (originally from Dynamo, 1992)
8. "Persiana Americana" (American Blinds) – 6:52 (originally from Signos, 1986)
9. "Verbo Carne" (Flesh Verb) – 3:55 (originally from Bocanada, 1999)
10. "Un Millón de Años Luz" (A Million Light Years) – 5:19 (originally from Canción Animal, 1990)
11. "Signos" (Signs) – 5:36 (originally from Signos, 1986)

=== Bonus tracks on DVD ===
1. "Pasos" (Demo) (originally from Sueño Stereo, 1995)
2. "Fue" (originally from Dynamo, 1992)
3. "Lisa" (originally from Amor Amarillo, 1993)
4. "Hombre al Agua" (originally from Canción Animal, 1990)

== Personnel ==
- Gustavo Cerati – Composer, Vocals
- Andrés Bercellini, Louis Martino, Richard Nant, Miguel Tallarita – Trumpet
- Dimitri Rodnoi, Diego Sánchez – Cello
- Kristina Bara, Elizabeth Ridolfi, Jorge Sandrini – Viola
- Pablo Aznarez, José Bagnatti, Damián Bolotín, Javier Casalla, María Mercedes Molina, Sebastián Prusak – Violin

=== Technical personnel ===
- Guillermo Andino – Executive Producer
- Eloisa Ballivián – Graphic Design
- Eduardo Bergallo – Engineer, Mixing
- Diego Blanco – Digital Editing
- Carmelo Domínguez – Executive Producer
- Alejandro Franov – Librettist
- Daniel Melero – Composer
- Gonzalo Rainoldi – Mixing Assistant
- Pablo Ramírez – Wardrobe
- Marcelo Rios – Wardrobe
- Mariano Rodriguez – Recording Assistant
- Diego Sáenz – Producer
- Sebastian Schachtel – Theremin
- Urko Suaya – Graphic Design
- Alejandro Terán – Arranger, Direction

== Charts ==
Chart performance for 11 Episodios Sinfónicos
Chart (2022)	Peak position
Argentine Albums (CAPIF)	7
