= Crimen =

Crimen may refer to:

- Nullum crimen, nulla poena sine praevia lege poenali, principle of European legal philosophy
- Impediment of Crime or crimen, impediment to Catholic marriage due to conspiracy to murder or death of previous spouse
- Crimen sollicitationis, secret Vatican document on handling some types of sexual misconduct by priests
- Crimen (film), a 1960 Italian film by Mario Camerini
- "Crimen" (song), a song by Gustavo Cerati
