= Gustavo Cerati =

Argentine musician (1959–2014)

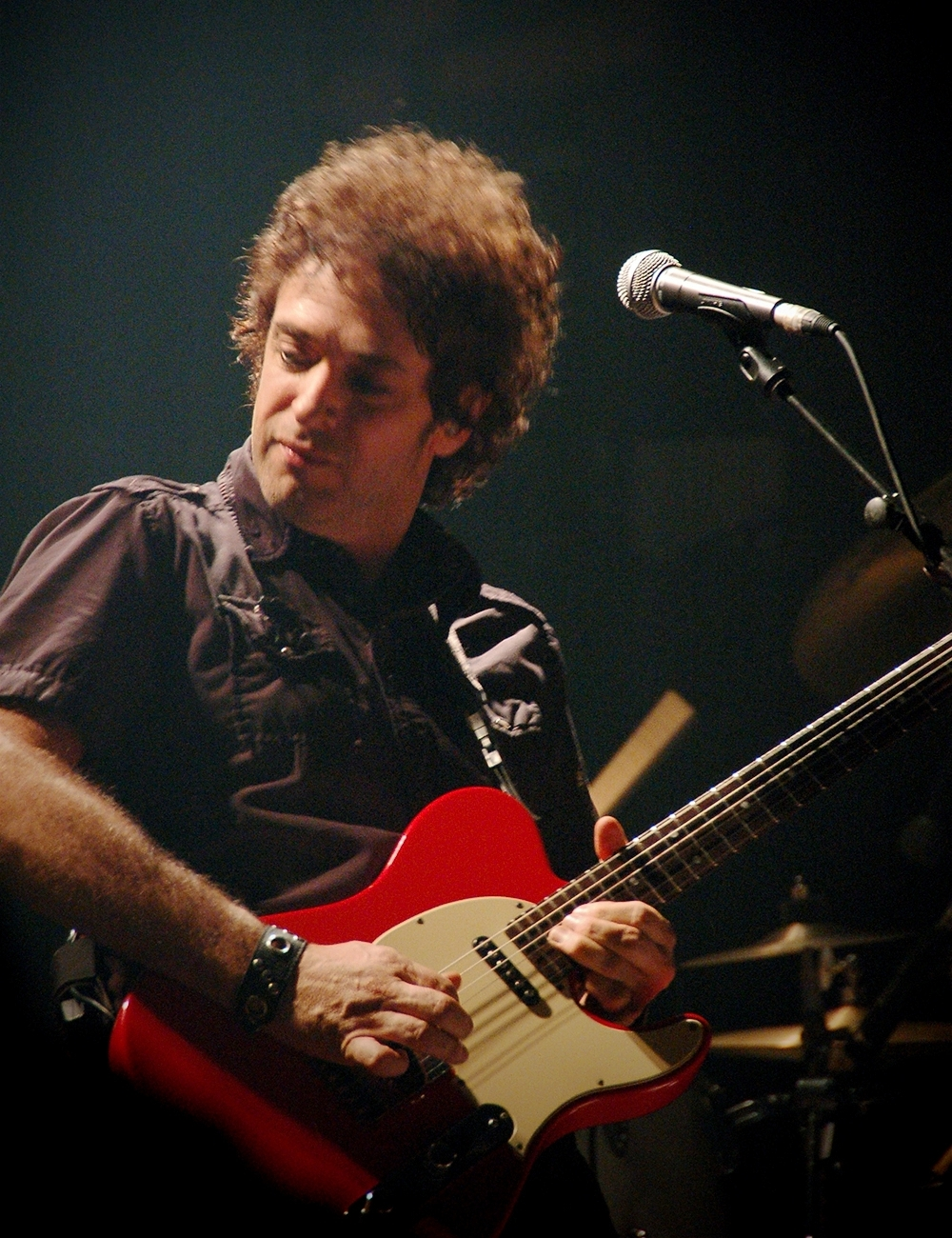
- Gustavo Cerati in 2006

Background information
- Born: Gustavo Adrián Cerati Clark; 11 August 1959; Buenos Aires, Argentina
- Died: 4 September 2014 (aged 55) Buenos Aires, Argentina
- Genres: Rock; electronic rock; pop rock; electronica; deep house
- Occupations: Musician; singer-songwriter; record producer
- Instruments: Vocals; guitar; bass; sampler; keyboards
- Years active: 1982–2010
- Labels: Sony; CBS; Sony BMG
- Website: cerati.com

Gustavo Adrián Cerati Clark (11 August 1959 – 4 September 2014) was an Argentine musician and singer-songwriter who gained international recognition for being the leader, vocalist, composer, and guitarist of the rock band Soda Stereo. He is widely considered by critics and musicians as one of the most important and influential artists of Latin rock.

Influenced by The Beatles and The Police, Cerati joined various groups during his adolescence, and in 1982, he founded Soda Stereo. As the band's leader and main composer, Cerati's songwriting matured with Signos (1986), Canción Animal (1990) and Dynamo (1992), all of which received near universal acclaim. Parallel to his career with the group, in 1992 he released the collaborative album Colores Santos with Daniel Melero, credited with popularising electronic music in South America.

Following the initial separation of Soda Stereo, he released the critically acclaimed solo albums Amor Amarillo (1993), Bocanada (1999) and Siempre es hoy (2002), the latter two drawing inspiration from dream pop, trip hop and downtempo. He returned to rock with his fourth album, Ahí vamos (2006), containing some of his best-selling solo songs, such as "Crimen" and "Adiós". In 2007, he reunited with Soda Stereo after ten years on a tour that sold over a million tickets. A prolific session player, he was a guest guitarist on songs by Caifanes, Babasónicos and Los Brujos, and he collaborated on songs with Charly García, Andrés Calamaro, Fito Páez, Shakira, Andy Summers, Roger Waters and Mercedes Sosa, among others.

In 2010, Cerati suffered a stroke that left him comatose until his death from cardiac arrest in 2014. In 2023, Billboard magazine ranked Cerati as the 33rd best rock singer of all time. In 2012, Rolling Stone ranked Cerati seventh among the 100 best Argentine rock guitarists. Throughout his solo career, he sold more than 10 million records and won numerous awards, including the Latin Grammy Awards, MTV Awards, Konex Awards, and Gardel Awards.

== Early life and Soda Stereo ==
Cerati was born on 11 August 1959 in Barracas, Buenos Aires, Argentina. He grew up in a middle class household; his father, Juan José Cerati, was of Lombard descent and his mother, Lilian Clarke, was of Irish origin. His father was an accountant and regularly traveled abroad. When Cerati was in elementary school, he drew comics and created his own comic book characters.

At nine years old, Cerati became interested in rock and roll when his parents gave him a guitar. His father brought home records from business trips, and after listening to "Purple Haze" by Jimi Hendrix, and "Pictures of Lily" by The Who, he was inspired to start his own band. By the age of 13, he formed a trio and started playing at house parties and in the local Catholic school, where he joined the choir.

After serving compulsory military service in 1979, Cerati enrolled at the Universidad del Salvador to pursue a marketing degree. He met Héctor "Zeta" Bosio and they both decided to form a band. In 1982, after various lineup changes that included Richard Coleman, Daniel Melero, and Andrés Calamaro, Bosio and Cerati recruited Charly Alberti as their drummer, and formed Soda Stereo.

Soda Stereo signed to Discos CBS in 1984 and released their debut LP Soda Stereo that same year. Nada Personal ("Nothing Personal") followed in 1985, giving Soda Stereo their first hit with "Cuando pase el temblor" ("When The Earthquake Is Past"). Soda released Signos ("Signs") in 1986, Doble Vida ("Double Life") (produced by longtime David Bowie collaborator Carlos Alomar) in 1988, and Canción Animal ("Animal Song") in 1990. During the 1990s Soda Stereo released Dynamo in 1992, Sueño Stereo ("Stereo Dream") in 1995, and their final album Comfort y Música Para Volar ('Comfort and music to fly with') in 1996.

== Solo career ==
=== 1990s ===
In 1992, Cerati recorded Colores Santos ("Holy Colors") with electronic musician Daniel Melero, a longtime Soda Stereo collaborator. 1993 saw the release of Cerati's first solo album Amor Amarillo ("Yellow Love"), which included the participation of Zeta Bosio and Cerati's wife at the time, the Chilean singer, actress, and model Cecilia Amenábar who sang and appeared in the video for the lead single "Te llevo para que me lleves" ("I'll take you so you can take me").

In 1995 Gustavo Cerati teamed up with three Chilean musicians, Andrés Bucci, Guillermo Ugarte, and Christian Powditch, to form Plan V. Plan V released two albums: Plan V (1996) and Plan Black V Dog (1998), a collaboration with the British electronic music group the Black Dog. In 1999 Cerati formed the electronic duo Ocio with longtime Soda Stereo collaborator and trumpeter Flavio Etcheto, releasing Medida Universal.

Around this time Cerati participated in the album Outlandos d'Americas: A Rock en Español Tribute to the Police collaborating with Andy Summers of the Police and Vinnie Colaiuta (Frank Zappa, Sting), on a cover of the Police's "Bring on the Night", (Spanish: Traeme la Noche).

Bocanada ("Puff") was released in 1999 and was regarded as Gustavo Cerati's proper debut as a solo artist. It was recorded in Estudio CasaSubmarina (Cerati's home studio) in Buenos Aires. Cerati used an MPC to record many of the tracks. The 48-piece orchestra in "Verbo Carne" was recorded in Abbey Road Studios in London. The album was also mixed and mastered in London at Townhouse Studios. Bocanada immediately reached gold status in Argentina and received many accolades in the Argentinian and Latin American press. The album was universally praised for its grandeur and its beauty and is still considered by critics and fans alike as Cerati's magnum opus. The veteran Mexican rock critic David Cortés Arce had this to say about it, "Bocanada is a fundamental album in the history of Iberoamerican Rock, in general, in all of the Spanish speaking countries."

=== 2000–2005 ===
In 2001, Cerati made his foray into film with the score for the movie +Bien (literally, "+Good." A better translation of the phrase as used in Argentina would be "Of course", "duh!"), in which he acted as well. The film was an independent movie directed by Eduardo Capilla, and starred Ruth Infarinato, VJ for Latin MTV. Cerati's wife at the time, Cecilia Amenábar, also played a small role in the film. The soundtrack was nominated for an award in the category of the best instrumental pop album at the 3rd Annual Latin Grammy Awards.

In August 2001, Cerati held a private concert in the historic Avenida Theatre in Buenos Aires. He was accompanied by a 42-piece orchestra conducted by Alejandro Terán. The recording of the concert was released as 11 Episodios Sinfónicos ("Eleven Symphonic Episodes") and consisted of seven arrangements of Soda Stereo classics and four of his solo songs played entirely by the orchestra. Cerati took 11 Episodios Sinfónicos on the road, playing Mexico City, Caracas, Santiago, and finishing it off with three shows at the Gran Rex theatre in Buenos Aires. The CD was well received by critics and fans alike, and a live DVD was eventually released.

In November 2002, Cerati released his third studio album Siempre es Hoy ("It's Always Today"). Cerati enlisted the help of producer/ engineer Sacha Triujeque and Antonio "Toy" Hernández of the Mexican Hip hop group Control Machete. The album was a departure from the slow tempo, Trip hop of Bocanada and +Bien, and the dramatic orchestration of 11 Episodios Sinfónicos. The songs on the album varied from pop/rock to radio-friendly electronic rock. The tour for Siempre es Hoy extended as far as New York and Chicago.

In 2003 Cerati released Siempre es Hoy: Reversiones ("It's Always Today: Re-versions") an album of remixes of Siempre es Hoy tracks from different Latin American Musicians and the German producer Wechsel Garland.

Simultaneously, Cerati teamed up with longtime collaborator Flavio Etcheto and Leandro Fresco to form the self-described "power laptop trio" Roken, which he played concurrently during the Siempre es Hoy tour. Roken's non-conventional approach focused on improvisation and writing songs in real time. They played in various festivals throughout Latin America as well as in underground clubs in the United States.

In 2004, "Canciones Elegidas 93-04" ("Selected Songs 93-04"), a double album compilation of Cerati's solo work, was released simultaneously in Spain and Argentina. The release was followed by a small tour of Mexico, Argentina, Chile and Spain.

=== 2005–2010 ===
After working for much of 2005 on new material, Cerati released Ahí Vamos ("There We Go") in April 2006. Co-produced by longtime Soda Stereo collaborator Tweety González, Ahí Vamos marked Cerati's triumphant return to guitar rock. For the recording of Ahí Vamos, Cerati was accompanied by longtime collaborators, Richard Coleman, Fernando Nalé, and many others. The album was mixed by Héctor Castillo, a prolific engineer whose credits include David Bowie, Lou Reed, and Aterciopelados, to name a few. The album was mastered by Howie Weinberg at Masterdisk in New York City. Ahí Vamos was lauded by fans and critics alike as a return to form for Cerati. The Ahí Vamos tour traveled through Latin America, the Caribbean, the United States (where he played in New York's Central Park), Spain, and on 12 October 2006, Cerati played London, England, for the first time in his career.

The album was showered with accolades and awards, receiving eight Gardel (the equivalent of a U.S. Grammy) nominations in Argentina and winning all but one of the nominations, a first for any Argentinian artist. In the Viña del Mar International Song Festival, Cerati was awarded the top prizes, "Antorcha de Oro," (Gold Torch) and the "Gaviota De Plata" (Silver Seagull). It was the most nominated album during the 2006 Latin Grammy Awards and the MTV Latino Awards. Cerati won three Grammys, for Best Rock Vocal, best Rock song, and one for the best producer with his production work on Shakira's Fijación Oral, Vol. 1 (Oral Fixation, Vol. 1). Ahí Vamos also topped the "best of" lists in the Argentinian press and he was even awarded a prize by the City of Buenos Aires for his contribution to Argentinian culture. Cerati closed the Ahí Vamos tour with a massive open-air show in Buenos Aires, held on the corner of Avenida Alcorta and Pampas. The free show was attended by 200,000 people.

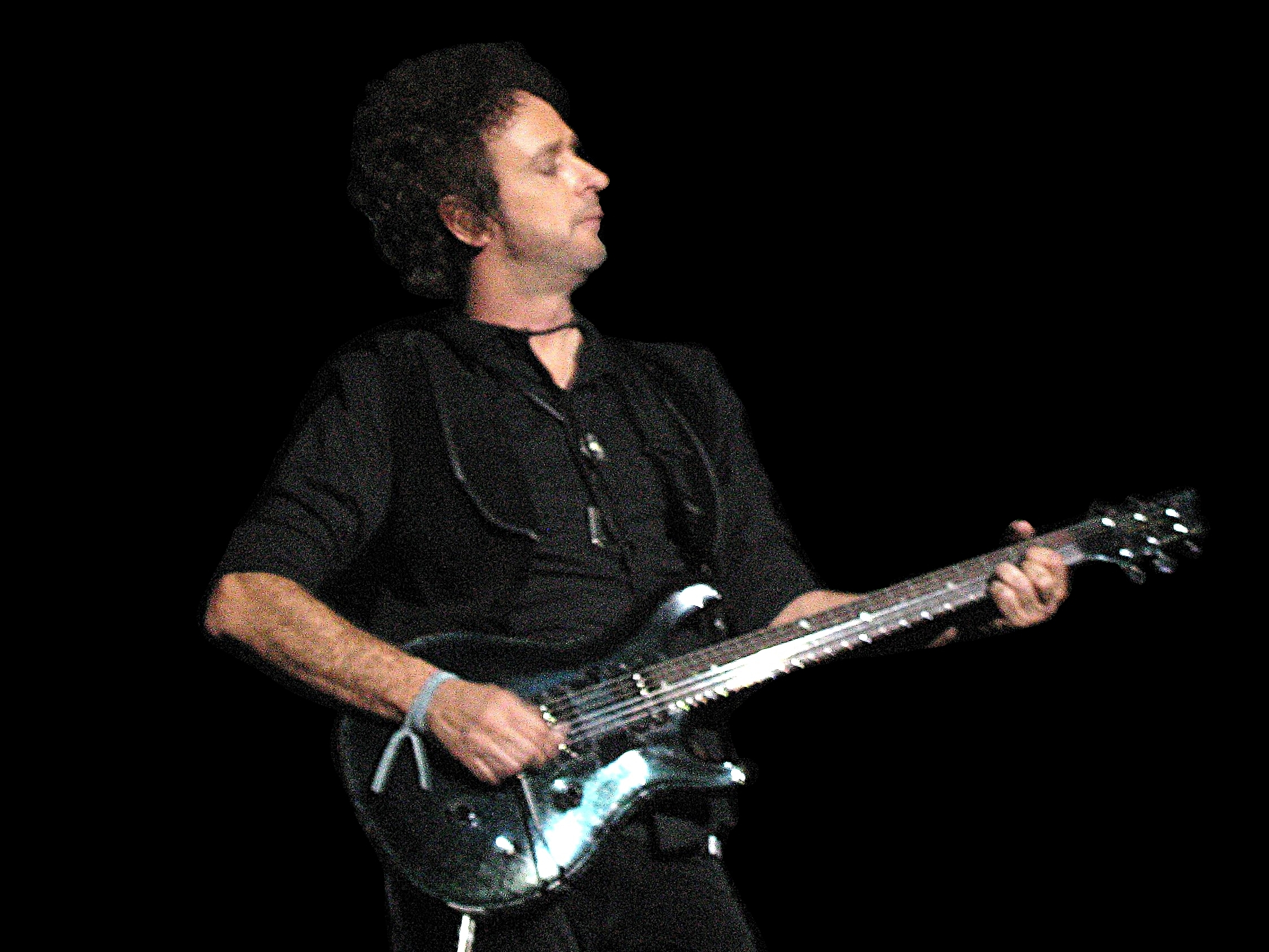
Cerati performing in 2007

2007 also saw the reunion of Soda Stereo. The subsequent comeback tour Me Verás Volver ("You will See Me Return") consisted of 22 concerts in nine countries: Argentina, Chile, Ecuador, Mexico the United States, Colombia, Panama, Venezuela and Peru. The tour was attended by more than one million fans and broke attendance records in various cities.

In July 2007, Cerati participated in the Live Earth Festival in Hamburg, Germany, alongside Shakira. Besides working with Shakira, Cerati contributed to Argentinian producer, musician, and two-time Oscar winner, Gustavo Santaolla's album Mar Dulce ("Sweet Sea"). Cerati sang on "El Mareo" the second single on Santaolalla's Mar Dulce which was recorded at Electric Lady Studios in New York City. In 2008, Cerati released a DVD version of Ahí Vamos and performed in various festivals throughout Latin America alongside, Shakira, Fito Páez, and Gustavo Santaolalla.

In late 2008, Cerati recruited many of the same musicians who worked on Ahí Vamos to begin work on his new album. In March 2009, Cerati and his band travelled to Stratosphere Sound in New York City and Looking Glass studios to record tracks for Fuerza Natural ("Natural Force"). Notable contributors included Héctor Castillo, Session drummer Sterling Campbell whose resume includes David Bowie, Cyndi Lauper, and Duran Duran, Didi Gutman of Brazilian Girls, bassist and lap steel guitarists Byron Isaacs, and keyboardist Glenn Patscha.

Fuerza Natural was a marked change from the riffing of Ahí Vamos and the electronics of Bocanada and Siempre es Hoy. The collections of songs focused on a cleaner, more acoustic pop sound, as well as folk and Neo-psychedelia. Rolling Stone Argentina took notice of this, "pero es más folkie, más espacial y más acústico, con una legión de guitarras, mandolinas y dobros que levantan polvo sobre las programaciones" (English: but it is more folkie, more spatial and acoustic, with a legion of guitars, mandolins, and dobros that sprinkle dust on the sequencers). Similar observations were made by Mariano Prunes writing in AllMusic, "Fuerza Natural has a curious sequencing structure, as it seems to be organized in stylistic batches. It begins with a trio of bona fide Cerati hits in that suave, effortless manner that always suited him so well; it then switches to a surprising but rather unsuccessful bluesy/folksy diptych."

Regardless of the mixed reviews, Fuerza Natural entered the charts in Argentina, Mexico, and Chile at No. 1. It is the first Cerati album to be sold in digital format in Argentina through MusicPass as well as was iTunes. The album sold 40,000 copies in Argentina in its first week of release and 500,000 albums worldwide. In 2010, Cerati was awarded a Latin Grammy for "Best Rock Song."

The Fuerza Natural tour kicked off on 19 November in Monterrey, Mexico. Cerati played Stadiums and large venues in Mexico, Argentina, Peru, Chile, The United States, Uruguay, Colombia and Venezuela, 21 shows in total. Cerati's final show was held in Caracas, Venezuela on 15 May 2010. Cerati suffered a stroke immediately after the show.

== Personal life ==
Gustavo Cerati maintained a very low public profile, and not much is known about his private life. Cerati's first wife, Belén Edwards, was an Argentine designer whom he married in 1987 and divorced in 1989. In 1993, he married the Chilean model, actress, and singer, Cecilia Amenábar. Their marriage lasted for nine years, and produced two children: Benito Cerati Amenábar, a singer and musician, and Lisa Cerati Amenábar.

After his divorce from Cecilia Amenábar, Cerati dated the Argentine model Deborah del Corral, ex-girlfriend of Soda Stereo drummer Charly Alberti in the 1990s. She also sang in Alberti's side project Plum.

In 2008, Cerati started dating the Argentine actress Leonora Balcarce. While they broke up in late 2009, they remained amicable, visiting his bedside throughout his coma.

Cerati maintained from 2004 until his last days a close acquaintance with the Uruguayan artist, Jill Mulleady.

Cerati met Argentine model, Chloe Bello during the summer of 2009, when she was 22 years old. Despite their age difference, the two became involved. Cerati invited Bello to attend the launch of Fuerza Natural in Mendoza and subsequently joined him on an international tour. Due to work obligations, Bello left his side before Cerati travelled to Caracas, where he suffered the stroke that led to his coma, the complications from which eventually cost him his life four years later.

== Failing health and death ==
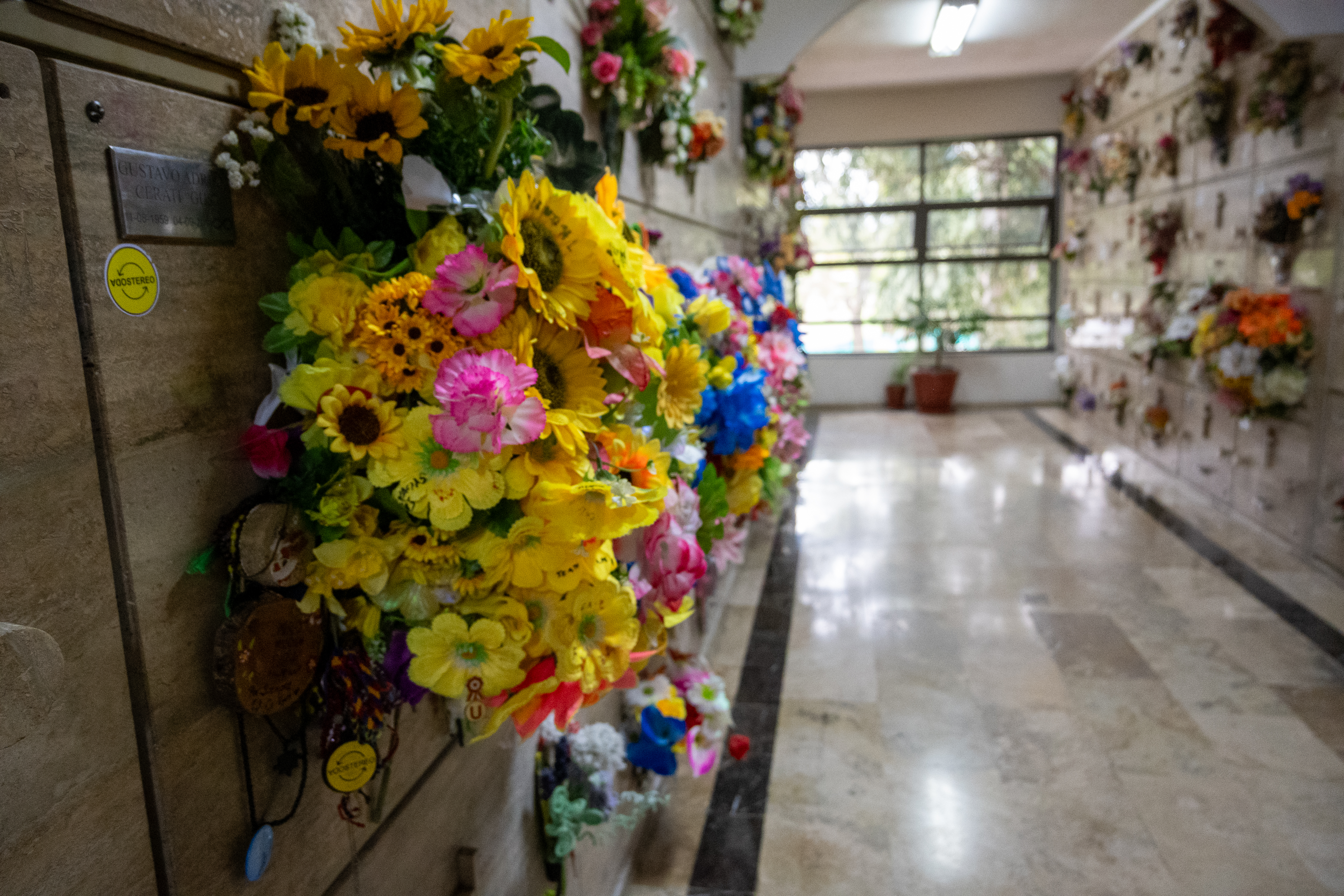
Cerati's crypt in the Nuestra Señora de la Merced Pantheon at La Chacarita Cemetery.

After performing two shows in Medellín and Bogotá, Colombia, Cerati headed to Venezuela and performed one last show in Caracas on 15 May 2010. Cerati suffered a stroke just after finishing this performance. He developed the first symptoms of an unknown condition backstage. He was hospitalised in Centro Médico La Trinidad in Caracas under medical surveillance. Three days later, Cerati underwent surgery to relieve pressure on his brain due to the stroke he suffered.

On 7 June 2010, Cerati was transferred to the FLENI Neurological Institute in Buenos Aires. Doctors immediately treated Cerati for a respiratory tract infection.

On 14 May 2014, the family released a statement to commemorate the fourth anniversary of the stroke. It included a medical report by Gustavo Barbalace M.D., stating: "Mr. Gustavo Cerati remains hospitalised (...) without any serious complications, in good nutritional shape, and without lesions due to immobility. Neurologically, there are no significant changes and remains under mechanical respiratory aid."

After four years in a coma, Gustavo Cerati died from cardiac arrest on the morning of 4 September 2014 while on life support. Immediately after his death, Cerati's doctor stated to the media "Gustavo died with dignity without any pain, without any wounds." His body was buried at La Chacarita Cemetery in Buenos Aires.

== Tributes and remembrances ==
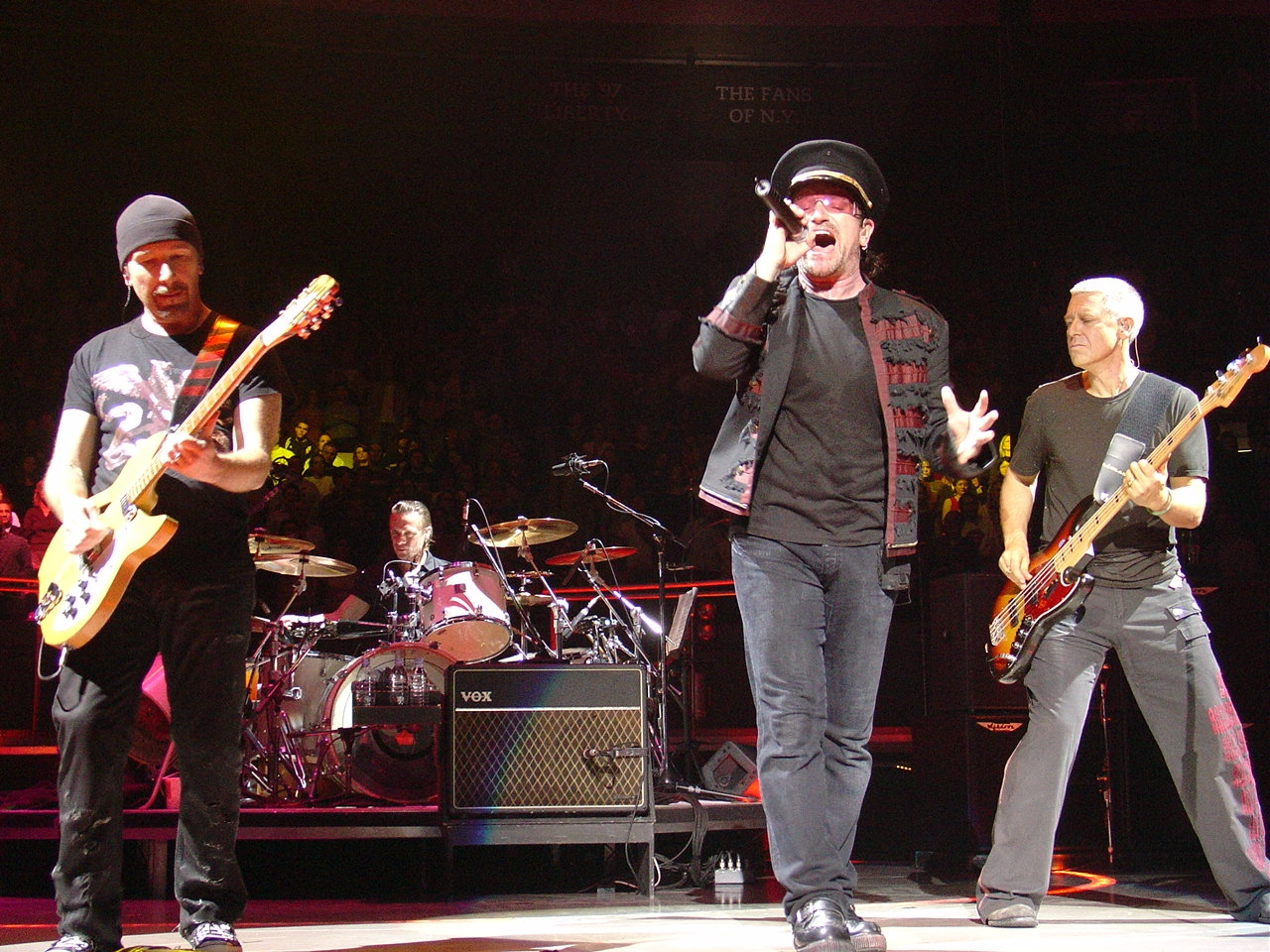
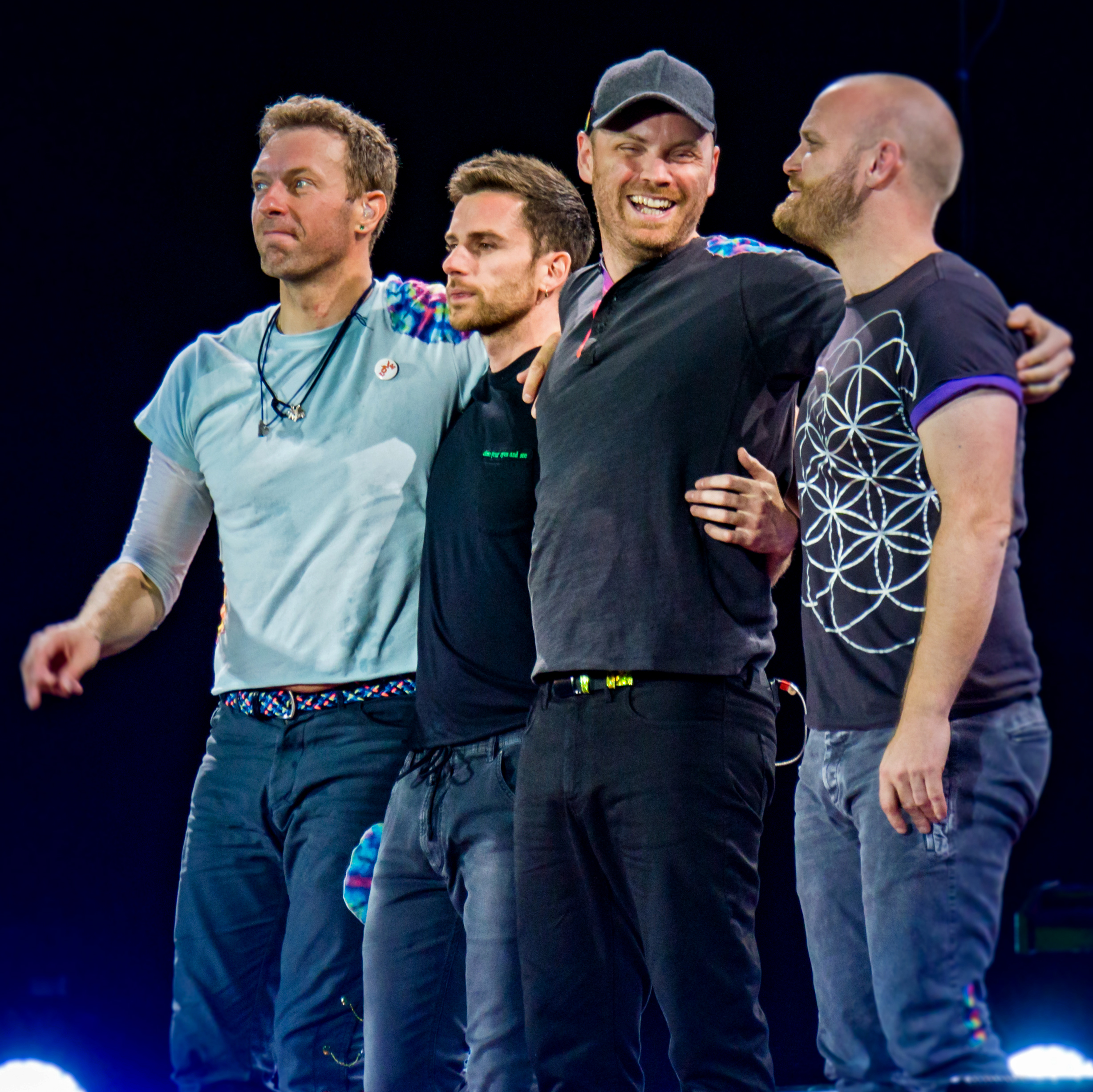
U2 (left) and Coldplay have been some of the international artists that paid tribute to Gustavo Cerati, covering Soda Stereo songs in their live performances

While performing at Rock in Rio Madrid on 5 June 2010, Colombian singer Shakira dedicated her song "Sale el Sol" to Cerati. It was her first live performance of the song, which became the title track of her ninth studio album.

During their U2 360° Tour, Irish rock band U2 paid tribute to Cerati during a concert in La Plata, Argentina, in March 2011. The tribute came during the intro to "Moment of Surrender". Bono said, "We would like you to think about Gustavo Cerati. We send him our love and respect, and he will hear our voices tonight." The 60,000 fans attending the show at the Único Stadium gave him a standing ovation.

Swedish rockers Roxette performed the intro of "De Música Ligera" before their song "Joyride" in one of their Travelling the World Tour shows in May 2012. The crowd sang the first verse of the song.

On 11 August 2015, Google celebrated his 56th birthday with a Google Doodle.

British rock band Coldplay paid tribute to Cerati by performing "De Música Ligera" on the final concerts of their A Head Full of Dreams Tour in La Plata, Argentina, on 14 November 2017. One year before, singer Chris Martin had revealed that his favourite Latin American songs were "De Música Ligera" and "Água de Beber" by Vinicius de Moraes and Tom Jobim.

In 2015, Cerati was featured on various Argentine stamps. Also, a street in Paraná was renamed in his honor.

In 2018, National Geographic Latin America created a two-part documentary series on Gustavo Cerati Also, several murals of Cerati were painted in Buenos Aires.

In 2025, Soda Stereo Ecos, a concert series by original Soda Stereo members: Zeta Bossio and Charly Alberti, was officially announced with the band, including a tribute to Gustavo Cerati as an hologram performing on stage.

== Discography ==
=== With Soda Stereo ===
- Soda Stereo (1984)
- Nada Personal (1985)
- Signos (1986)
- Doble Vida (1988)
- Canción Animal (1990)
- Dynamo (1992)
- Sueño Stereo (1995)

=== Solo ===
- Amor Amarillo (1993)
- Bocanada (1999)
- Siempre es hoy (2002)
- Ahí Vamos (2006)
- Fuerza Natural (2009)

=== Concept ===
- +Bien (Movie Soundtrack) (2001)
- 11 Episodios Sinfónicos (Live with Symphonic Orchestra) (2001)
- 14 Episodios Sinfónicos/En Vivo/Auditorio Nacional de México/Febrero 2022 (Live with Symphonic Orchestra) (2022)

=== Collaboration albums ===
- Colores Santos with Daniel Melero (1992)
- Colores Santos, the Remixes with Daniel Melero (1995)
- Plan V (1996) with Plan V
- Plan Black V Dog (1998) with Plan V
- Medida Universal (1999) with Ocio
- Insular [EP] (2000) with Ocio
- Roken (with Flavius E., Leandro Fresco) (only live presentations, no recordings exist) (2004)
- Satélite Cerati (es) (2018) (posthumous compilation album)

=== Producer ===
- (1986) – Fricción
- Sueños en tránsito (1997) – Nicole
- Outlandos D'Americas: A Rock en Español Tribute to the Police (1998) (Ark 21)
- Mar (2001) – Leo García (singer)
- Héroes Antologia: 1986/1988 (2004) – Fricción
- Fijación Oral, Vol. 1 (2005) – Shakira
- Oral Fixation, Vol. 2 (2006) – Shakira
- Sale el Sol (2010) – Shakira

=== Guest musician ===
- Caifanes (1988) – Caifanes
- La Gota Cava La Piedra (Vidala La Rioja) (1991) – Virginia Vilte
- Tango 4 (1991) – Charly García / Pedro Aznar
- De Vicio Me Has de Aborrecer (Baguala, Tucuman) (1991) – Virginia Vilte
- Travesia (1992) – Los Siete Delfines
- Pasto (1992) – Babasónicos
- Fin de Semana Salvaje (1995) – Los Brujos
- Pinamar (2000) – Francisco Bochaton
- Andrea Álvarez (2001) – Andrea Álvarez
- Plastico (2001) – Los Calzones
- Curvas (2002) – Antonio Birabent
- Pr3ssion (2003) – Pr3ssion
- Vida Real (2004) – Acida
- Fan (2004) – Fernando Samalea
- 19 (2004) – Emmanuel Horvilleur
- Mama Killer Night (2004) – CAPRI
- El Mago (2004) – Cerati – Samalea
- Cassette (2005) – Telefunka
- No (2005) – Shakira
- The Day and the Time (2005) – Shakira
- Inconsciente Colectivo (2005) – Fabiana Cantilo
- Cuarto Creciente (2005) – Leo García
- Easy (2006) – Wechsel Garland
- Mar dulce (2007) – Bajofondo
- Avion (2008) – No lo Soporto
- Sueño en Gotas (2008) – D-Mente
- Primicia (2009) – Fernando Samalea
- Discotape (2010) – CAPRI
- Espuma de Sol (2010) – Sebastian Escofet
- The Child Will Fly (2008) – With Roger Waters, Shakira, Eric Clapton, Pedro Aznar
- Normal (2011) – Richard Coleman
- Estrategias Fatales (2012) – Daniel Melero
- Desde el papel (2012) – 202
- Viento (2012) – Christian Basso
- Sol de Medianoche (2015) – Leandro Fresco

== Filmography ==
- +bien (2001) – Cerati played the character named Jorge

IMDb profile

== Clothing line ==
- GC Basement
