= Siempre es hoy =

Siempre Es Hoy

Studio album by Gustavo Cerati
- Released: 26 November 2002
- Recorded: April 2001–September 2002
- Studios: Estudios Del Cielito, Estudios Capitán, Estudios Santito and Estudios El Pie - Buenos Aires, Argentina
- Genres: Pop rock, electronic music, art pop
- Length: 71:05
- Label: BMG
- Producer: Gustavo Cerati

Gustavo Cerati chronology
Bocanada (1999)	Siempre Es Hoy (2002)	Ahí Vamos (2006)

Professional ratings
Review scores
Source	Rating
Allmusic	3.5/5 stars

Siempre Es Hoy (Spanish for "It is always today") is the third solo studio album by Argentine musician Gustavo Cerati, released by BMG International on 26 November 2002. The following year, it was nominated for a Grammy Award in the Best Latin Alternative Rock Album category. The album continued the electronic-oriented approach of Bocanada (1999), while incorporating elements of pop rock. Siempre Es Hoy was certified gold in Argentina for sales of 20,000 copies.

== Background and recording ==
Following the critical success of Bocanada (1999) and subsequent musical projects such as 11 Episodios Sinfónicos and +Bien, Cerati sought to "make a rhythmic and powerful album, unlike Bocanada, which was more subtle and elegant". Developed during Argentina's severe economic crisis of 1998-2002, the project was originally conceived as a double album but was reduced to a single CD. By the end of production, Cerati had selected 17 tracks from approximately 40 songs, some of which were only preliminary demos. The resulting album ran for more than 70 minutes, "an unusual venture for the [Argentine] music industry at that time".

== Music ==
Cerati described the rhythm section to be influenced by hip-hop, "a genre [he] was listening to a lot [at the time]", with the guitars and melodies adopting a more conventional style of rock/pop. The album also explores scratching and Argentinian folk percussion. A variety of guests were brought, including Charly García and other artists who contributed to the experimental sound of the project.

Some of the songs were remixed for the 2003 album, Reversiones: Siempre Es Hoy. These songs were remixed by several guest musicians including Leandro Fresco, Bostich from Nortec Collective, Miranda!, Kinky and DJ Orange, all to various electronic-music styles.

== Track listing ==
All tracks are written by Gustavo Cerati, except where noted.

No.	Title	Writer(s)	Length
1.	"Cosas imposibles" (Impossible Things)	Cerati - Flavio Etcheto	5:05
2.	"No te creo" (I Don't Believe You)		3:46
3.	"Artefacto" (Artifact)	Cerati - Etcheto	4:16
4.	"Nací para esto" (I Was Born for This)		3:09
5.	"Amo dejarte así" (I Love Leaving You Like This)		5:25
6.	"Tu cicatriz en mí" (Your Scar Inside Me)		4:17
7.	"Señales luminosas" (Bright Signals)		3:24
8.	"Karaoke"		3:54
9.	"Sulky"		4:29
10.	"Casa" (House)	Cerati - Etcheto	4:32
11.	"Camuflaje" (Camouflage)		3:55
12.	"Altar" (Shrine)	Cerati - Etcheto - Camilo Castaldi	4:01
13.	"Torre de marfil" (Ivory Tower)		4:38
14.	"Fantasma" (Ghost)		3:19
15.	"Vivo" (Alive)		4:20
16.	"Sudestada"		4:31
17.	"Especie" (Species)		3:42
Total length:			70:48

== Sales and certifications ==
Region	Certification	Certified units/sales
Argentina (CAPIF)	Gold	20,000^{^}
^{^} Shipments figures based on certification alone.
