= Olivia Wald =

Argentinian musical artist

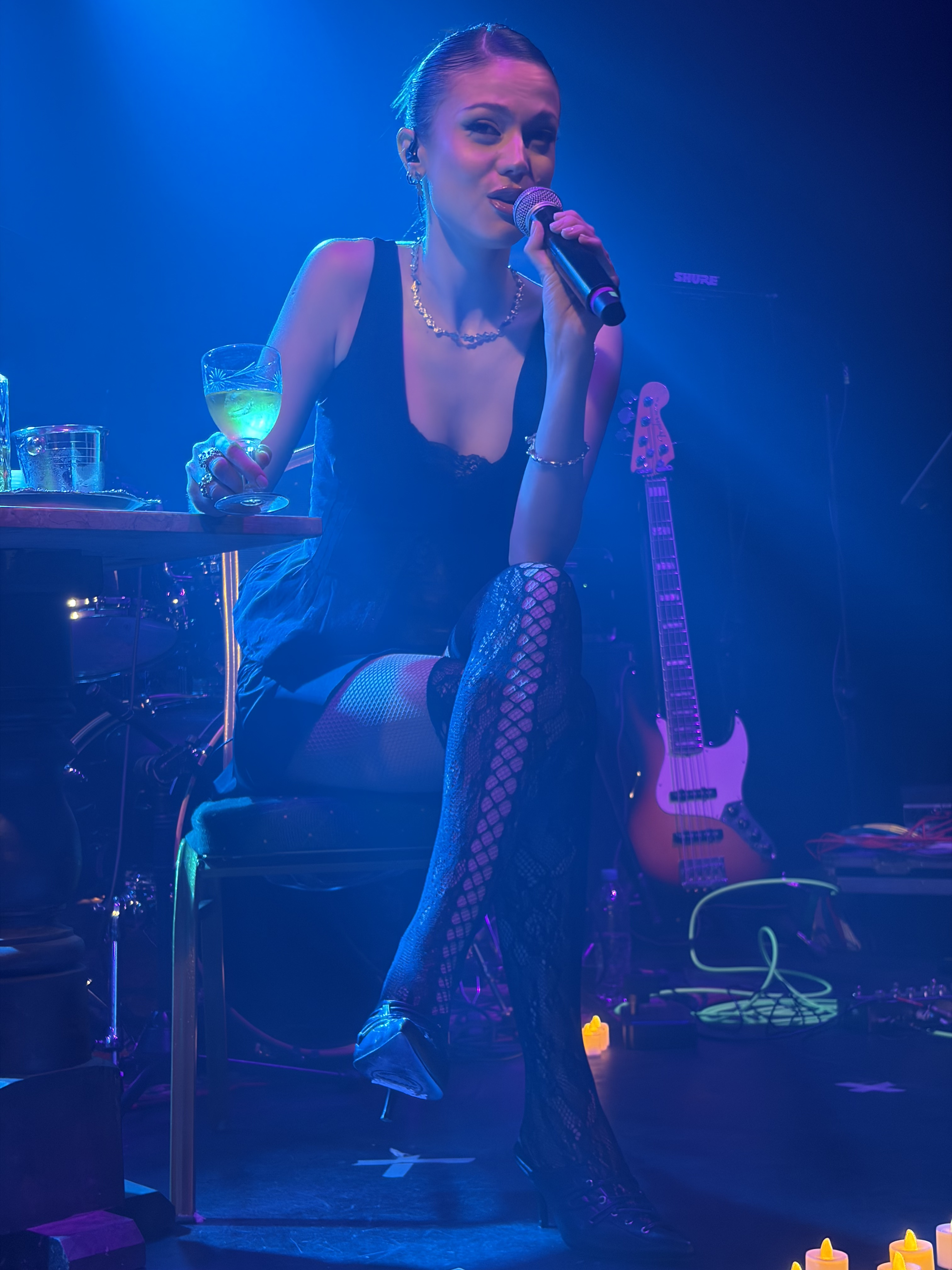
- Wald in Montevideo, August 2026

Background information
- Born: Olivia Grunewald; 3 December 1996 (age 29); Buenos Aires, Argentina
- Origin: Argentina
- Genres: Pop; Latin pop
- Occupations: Singer; songwriter
- Years active: 2016–present
- Label: Universal Music México (since 2023)

Olivia Wald is the stage name of Olivia Grunewald (born 3 December 1996), an Argentine pop singer and songwriter.

== Biography ==
From childhood she showed an interest in singing and songwriting, writing and recording her first song at age 10. Between 2016 and 2018 she was a member of the pop-cumbia band Acantilados. She holds a degree in public relations, studied part of a journalism degree, and worked as a model before pursuing music professionally.

== Career ==
In 2019 she began her solo career with the single "Se Nos Hizo Tarde". Between 2020 and 2023 she released several singles, including "Donde Estés", "777", "Laberinto" and "Llamada".

In 2024 she released the EP Temporada de Canciones Tristes and the single "En la cara", which went viral on TikTok and reached number one on Spotify's charts in Argentina, later reaching the top of the charts in Uruguay as well. That year she performed at the Movistar Arena in Buenos Aires as a guest of Q' Lokura, performing "En la cara" live.

On 4 March 2025 she released her debut studio album, Cuerpo (Universal Music), a ten-track record. In December 2025 she released the single "Pecadora", and on 23 July 2026 released her second studio album, Otra Que Arde.

She has collaborated with artists including Q' Lokura (on "En la cara (En Vivo)" and "La Lokura (Remix)"), Rusherking, Carlos Rivera and Álex Ubago. In 2025 she released the remix "Esto es amor" with Argentine singer Chule, the single "Paladar" (featuring Valentina Olguín and Chule), and the single "Sobria no me aguanto" with Valentina Olguín. She also took part in the remix "Tu Mirada" with Mexican artist E-Lhoy. In 2026 she collaborated with Argentine singer Coti on "Tus Errores", included on Otra Que Arde, and with Córdoba band Los Caligaris on "Hoy te soñé", included on the deluxe edition of their album Caligaris Sí (August 2026).

== Awards and recognition ==
In 2025 she received the Gardel Award for Best New Artist, awarded by CAPIF. In 2026 she received a second Gardel Award nomination, for Best Pop Artist Album (Mejor Álbum Artista Pop), for her debut album Cuerpo. She was also featured by Rolling Stone en Español in its "Future of Music" series.
