= Cecilia Amenábar =

Chilean actress, model and artist (born 1971)

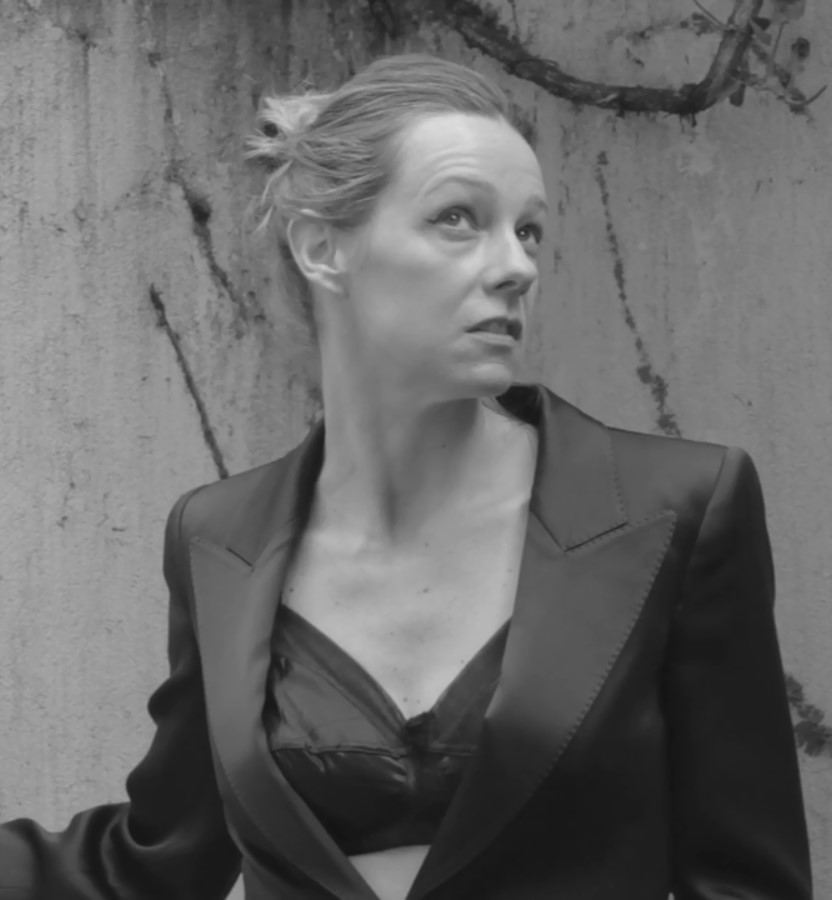
- Born: April 5, 1971 (age 55); Santiago, Chile
- Spouse: Gustavo Cerati (m. 1993–2002)

María Cecilia Amenábar Granella (born 5 april 1971) is a Chilean actress, model, and artist.

After a career in modeling, Amenábar along with model Daniela Benavente, hosted Revolver, a cultural television program for TVN. She has worked on both sides of the camera, as an actress in the 2003 film Sexo con Amor, and as a director for several music videos.

Since 2004, Amenábar has been making appearances as a DJ in several nightclubs around Buenos Aires. As she prefers people to focus on her music rather than on herself, she usually asks to have the lights turned down while she is playing.

Amenábar was married to Argentine musician Gustavo Cerati from 1993 till 2002. They have two children: Lisa and Benito. She collaborated in vocals and double bass in Cerati's first solo album: Amor Amarillo.
