= The Child Will Fly =

Song by Roger Waters, Gustavo Cerati, Shakira, Eric Clapton, Pedro Aznar

Song by Roger Waters featuring Shakira, Eric Clapton, Gustavo Cerati, Pedro Aznar
- Recorded: 2008
- Genre: Rock opera; folk
- Length: 13:00

"The Child Will Fly" is an unreleased charity song by English musician Roger Waters featuring Shakira, Eric Clapton, Gustavo Cerati, and Pedro Aznar. The song was written for the ALAS Foundation by Waters and Cerati. Recorded in 2008, the song leaked in early 2014 and a few months later a fanmade music video for the song went viral.

== Background and composition ==
"It's a 13-minute, mile-long song with a very Floyd-esque feel, like the harmonies. But there are a good number of guests, so I don't know where it's going to end up."

— Roger Waters on "The Child Will Fly".

"The Child Will Fly" was recorded in New York City in 2008 for and about the Latin American non-profit children's ALAS Foundation. It is by English musician Roger Waters, and features four other musicians: Colombian Shakira, Argentine Gustavo Cerati and Pedro Anzar, and English Eric Clapton; all members of the foundation. Cerati and Aznar stayed at Waters' home during the recording process, recording their parts first, and later were recorded those of Shakira and Clapton. The song leaked online in early 2014 and is amongst the last songs Cerati recorded before falling into a coma.

"The Child Will Fly" is a rock opera and South American folk song with a runtime of 13 minutes and has socially charged lyrics. Waters refers to Latin American children, singing about their potential to become figures like Gardel or Gabriel García Márquez if they receive the help they need to "fly". Shakira and Cerati sing in Spanish; her lyrics include references to the favelas of Rio de Janeiro, while his mention the Peruvian Andes. In the instrumental, Clapton is on a guitar solo while Aznar is playing other instruments.

MMX described how “The Child Will Fly” showcases music’s ability to connect artists globally for important causes, in this case uniting talented musicians to promote child development and well-being in Latin America and the Caribbean.

== Music video ==
An unofficial fanmade music video for "The Child Will Fly" uploaded to YouTube in May 2014 was being shared widely on the web, drawing significant attention to the song. The video features clips filmed in Buenos Aires, Argentina for the song, and directed by Argentine Diego Kaplan. It shows Waters' 2012 visit to the Villa 31 slum in Buenos Aires, where he had a music workshop where he together with children made percussion instruments from scavenged garbage, such as water bottles and trash cans, and played them. Kaplan told local media after filming with Waters for five hours, "He's an exceptional person and human being, I have no words to describe it."
