= Colores Santos =

Studio album by Cerati/Melero
- Released: March 25, 1992
- Recorded: 1991–1992
- Studio: Supersónico (Buenos Aires, Argentina)
- Genre: Neo-psychedelia; Madchester; electronic; dream pop; alternative rock; experimental pop
- Length: 50:37
- Label: Sony
- Producer: Gustavo Cerati, Daniel Melero

Singles from Colores Santos
- 1. "Vuelta Por el Universo" Released: 1992; 2. "Hoy Ya No Soy Yo" Released: 1992

Professional ratings
Review scores
Source	Rating
AllMusic	3/5 stars
RateYourMusic.com	3.5/5 stars

Colores Santos (Spanish for "Holy Colors") is an album released by Argentine musicians Gustavo Cerati and Daniel Melero under the name Cerati/Melero in 1992. The album was recorded and released previous to Soda Stereo's album Dynamo (also influenced by Melero's state-of-the-art musical exploration), at the peak of the band's popularity. The album has a strong electronic influence which would inform Dynamo and help kickstart the electronic rock scene in Argentina. AllMusic critic Iván Adaime wrote that "Somehow this album was like a UFO in the Argentine early-'90s rock scene".

== Track listing ==
All tracks are written by Gustavo Cerati and Daniel Melero, except where noted.

No.	Title	Writer(s)	Length
1.	"Vuelta Por el Universo" ("Trip Around the Universe")		6:03
2.	"Marea de Venus" ("Venus' Tide")		4:25
3.	"Cozumel"		3:37
4.	"Quatro"		5:10
5.	"Pudo Ser" ("Could Have Been")		5:26
6.	"Hoy Ya No Soy Yo" ("Today I'm not Myself Anymore")		4:09
7.	"La Cuerda Planetaria" ("Planetary String")	Melero	4:57
8.	"Madre Tierra" ("Mother Earth")		4:30
9.	"Tu Medicina" ("Your Medicine")	Cerati	4:40
10.	"Alborada" ("Dawn")		2:49
11.	"Colores Santos" ("Holy Colors")		4:47
Total length:			50:37

== Personnel ==
- Gustavo Cerati & Daniel Melero - Instruments and vocals
- Flavio Etcheto - Trumpet on Madre Tierra.
- Carola Bony - Vocals on Pudo Ser and Colores Santos.
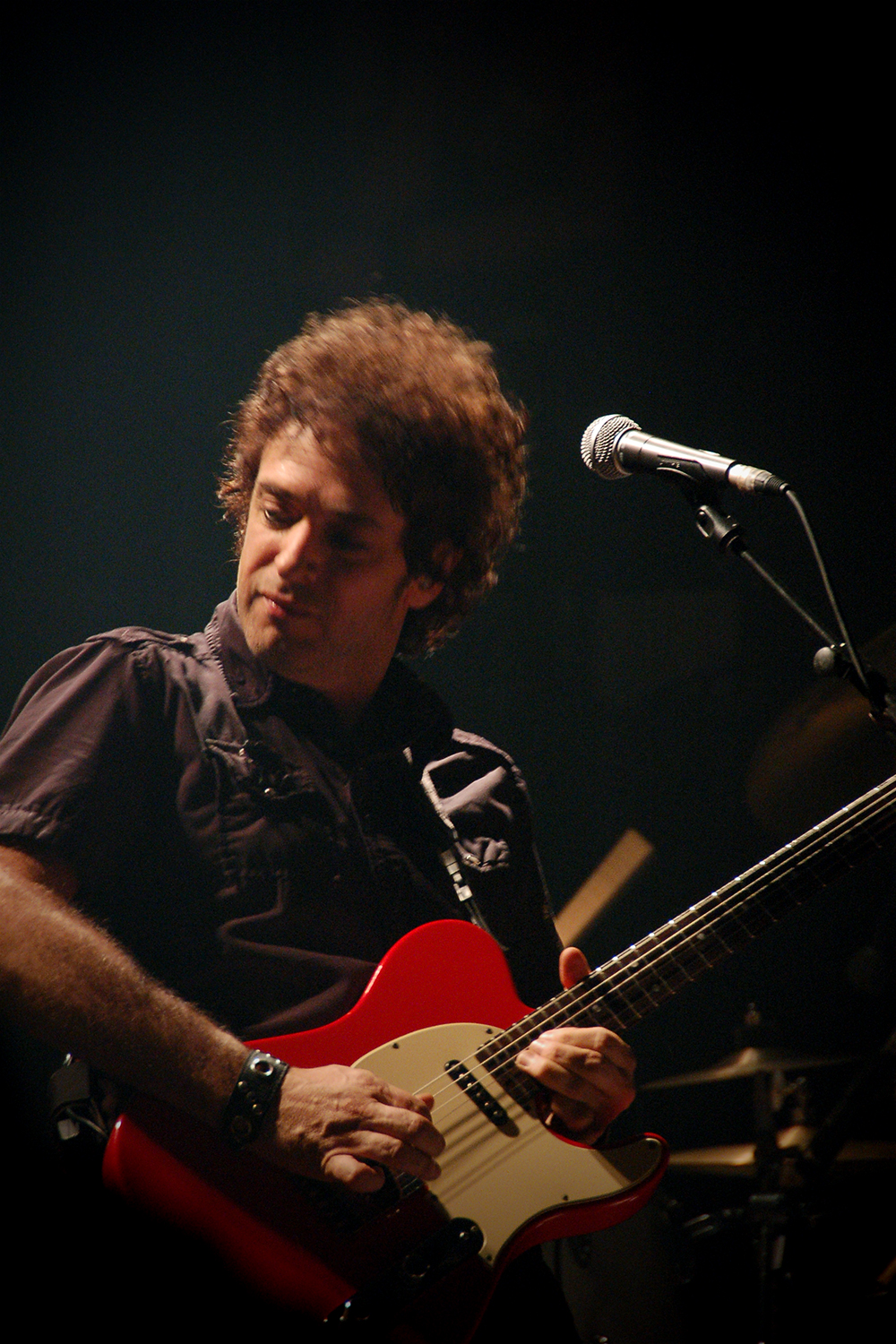
Gustavo Cerati (left) and Daniel Melero (right) co-wrote, produced and recorded Colores santos.
