= The Townhouse =

Coordinates: 53.7467°N 0.3427°W

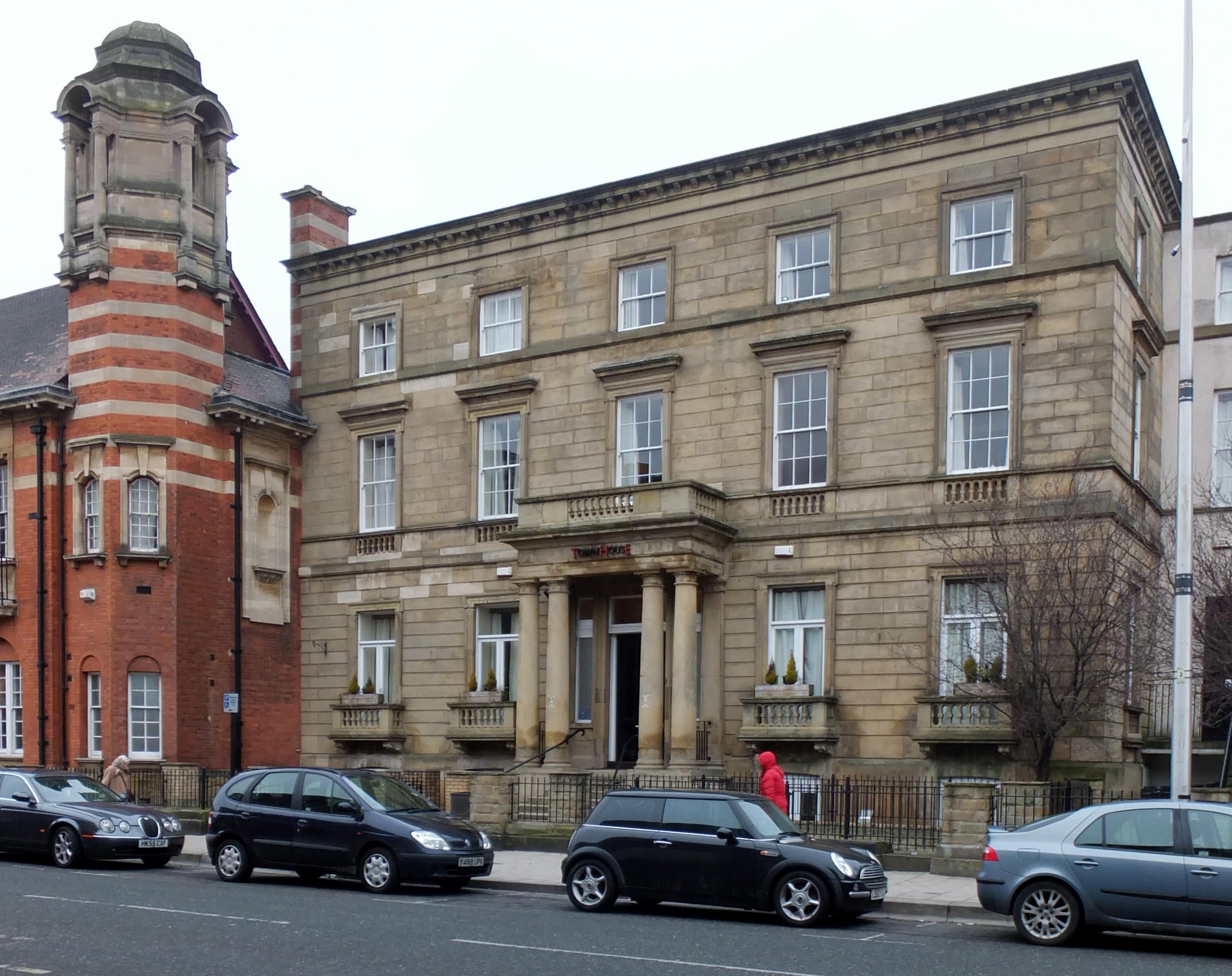
- The Townhouse, Kingston upon Hull

General information
- Type: Private Accommodation
- Address: The Townhouse, Albion Street, Kingston upon Hull
- Country: England
- Completed: 1846

The Townhouse is a Grade II listed building located in the city centre of Kingston upon Hull, East Riding of Yorkshire, England, built in 1846. Formerly a four star hotel, since September 2011, the building has been used as private student accommodation. Its primary residents are students at Hull University.

== History ==
The Townhouse has been developed in one of Hull's finest buildings. Queen Victoria commissioned the building for her personal physician Sir James Alderson in 1846. Before it was converted into a hotel in 2006, it had been used as a nightclub.

Many features of the original building have been maintained, such as the sweeping staircase and ornate pillars. Modern new features include an Italian marble reception area.
