= Gaby Herbstein =

Argentine photographer and artist (born 1969)

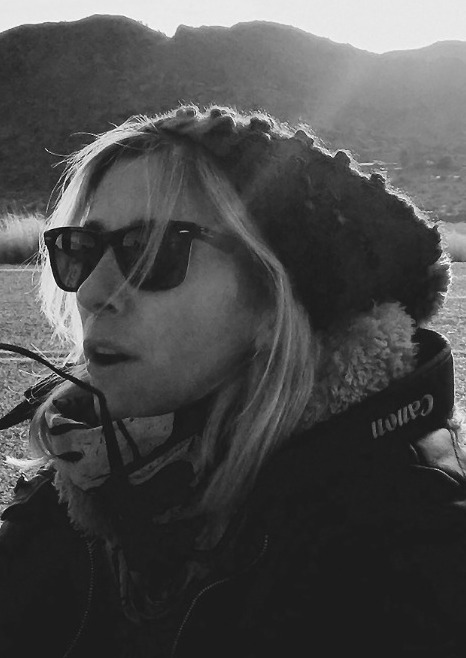
- Herbstein in 2018
- Born: 3 May 1969 (age 57); Buenos Aires
- Occupation: Photographer
- Website: gabyherbstein.com

Gaby Herbstein (born May 3, 1969) is an Argentine visual artist and photographer. Her work has been published in magazines, books, blogs and exhibitions across Latin America, the US, Russia, China and Japan.

== Life and career ==
Growing up she wished to be an Egyptologist, but given the limited opportunity for studying such careers in Argentina she instead chose to study tourism. While studying tourism she joined a friend in a photography class and instantly became hooked. Before she'd even finished her professional training, she started working as a photographer for major fashion magazines in Latin America.

=== Artistic Projects ===
Her first solo exhibition took place in a Buenos Aires nightclub in 1990 and since then she has showcased her work annually in Argentina and abroad.

Herbstein regularly produces and exhibits personal projects that deal with social and environmental issues. These have included:

- Huellas (1999) meant to be an exploration of the identity of native Argentine women.
- Heroínas (2000) a tribute to noted women in Argentine history,
- Huella Ecológica (2009) and La Basura no es Basura (2010) for the Fundación Azara that had environmental themes.

She has also worked on four projects for the Fundación Huésped, photographing Argentine celebrities to raise awareness about the spread and prevention of the HIV virus.

Her first book, Aves del Paraíso (2009), was themed around birds to raise awareness of species extinction.

In 2011, Herbstein created Uno, a series of images that represent humans as being one with nature.

Estados de Conciencia (2013), a series of photographs representing the different states of consciousness in the journey of self-discovery.

Divine Beauty (2015). Thirteen portraits of girls in a photo essay themed on Sacred Geometry.

Creer para Ver, (Believe to See) started in 2016, still in process. A multidisciplinary project that spreads the voice of 12 spiritual leaders of different beliefs, philosophies and cultures from around the world, supported by ONU.

La Diablada (Dance of the Demons) (2017), a production inspired by the Carnival rituals and the Andean traditions.

=== Awards and acknowledgements ===
2017 SRI SRI Award 2017 Nomination to the outstanding woman in art.

2017 CILSA Social Commitment Award.

2017 Winner of the Latin American Photography and Illustration (2017) Contest for La Diablada (Dance of the Demons).

2017 Prize for Creative Woman 2017 awarded by the Circle of Creative Women and the University of Palermo.

2016 Winner at Latin American Photography and Illustration (2016), Phi, from "Divina Belleza".

2015 Silver Medal, Books - Fine Art, Prix de la Photographie. Paris, France.

2015 Gold Medal, Fine Art (People), Concept and Photography, Prix de la Photographie. Paris, France.

2011 Clover Prize, Swarovski. Buenos Aires, Argentina.

2009 First Prize for Best Book of the Year to “Aves del Paraíso”, Cámara Argentina de Publicaciones. Buenos Aires, Argentina.

2002 Fundación Huésped Award, Buenos Aires, Argentina.

=== Fashion and advertising ===
Herbstein has worked on the advertising campaigns for a number of brands.
