= +Bien =

+ bien

Soundtrack album by Gustavo Cerati
- Released: 2001
- Genre: Electronic music, ambient, acoustic music
- Length: 34:14
- Label: Sony International

Gustavo Cerati chronology
Bocanada (1999)	+ bien (2001)	11 Episodios Sinfónicos (2001)

+Bien (or Más Bien) is the eponymous soundtrack for the Argentine-produced film released in 2001. All 11 tracks were composed and performed by Gustavo Cerati for the movie. Cerati also acted in the movie.

== Track listing ==
No.	Title	English translation	Length
1.	"La costura de Dios"	God's seam	2:40
2.	"Kuro"	Black	4:03
3.	"Es sólo una ilusión"	It's just an illusion	3:38
4.	"Paracaídas"	Parachute	3:29
5.	"Regando"	Watering	2:57
6.	"La costura de Dios v2"	God's seam v2	1:48
7.	"Simil paraíso"	Simil paradise	2:59
8.	"Todos duermen"	Everyone sleeps	1:31
9.	"Llegaste"	You arrived	4:03
10.	"Paisaje porcelana"	Porcelain landscape	1:48
11.	"+ Bien"	More Good	5:21
