= Ruth Infarinato =

Argentine actress and journalist

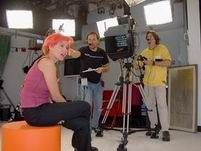
- Infarinato at Conexión MTV studio in 2001
- Born: Ruth Daniela Infarinato Morrizon; Buenos Aires, Argentina
- Occupations: Journalist, actress and TV host

Ruth Daniela Infarinato Morrizon is an Argentine actress, TV host and journalist. She has been known as one of the strongest figures in the Latin-American youth audience for being VJ for more than 10 years in MTV Latin America.

She currently lives in Miami, Florida.

== Career ==
Since early 1990s, Infarinato was regular host of some MTV Latinoamérica's shows, including Conexión, that was one of MTV's outstanding programs.
