= Avenida Theatre =

Theatre in Buenos Aires, Argentina

Coordinates: 34°36′34″S 58°23′02″W

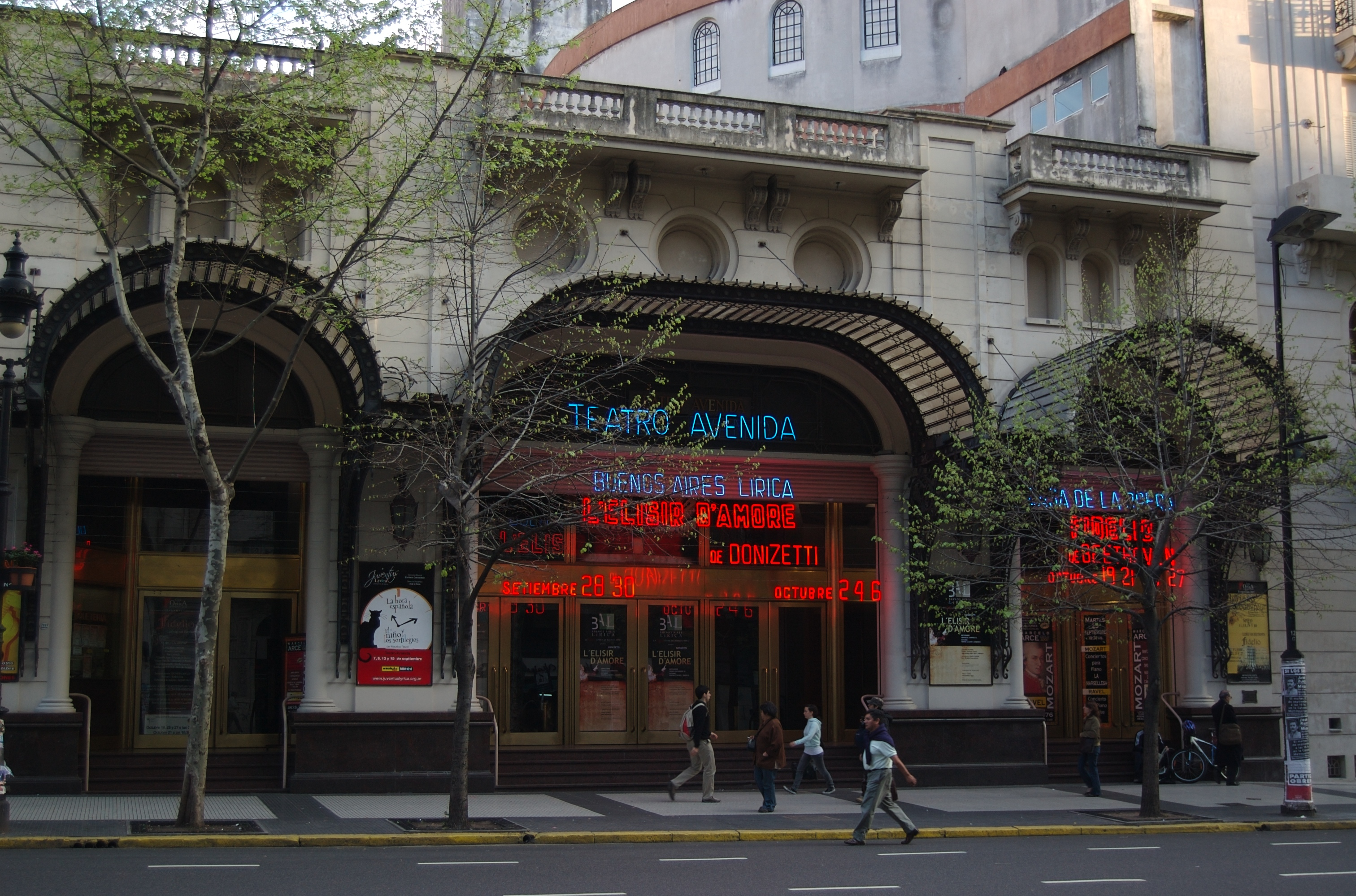
The Avenida Theatre

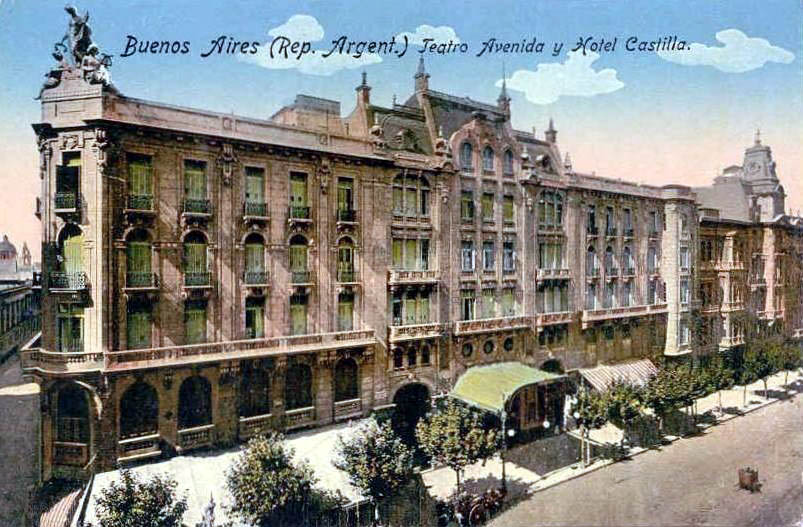
The theatre and the former Hotel Castilla as they appeared around 1910

The Avenida Theatre (Teatro Avenida) is a theatre in Buenos Aires, Argentina.

== Overview ==
The Avenida Theatre was inaugurated on Buenos Aires' central Avenida de Mayo in 1908 with a production of Spanish dramatist Lope de Vega's Justice Without Revenge. The production was directed by María Guerrero, a Spanish Argentine theatre director who popularized classical drama in Argentina during the late 19th century and would establish the important Cervantes Theatre in 1921. The theatre became the chief venue for Spanish theatre in Buenos Aires after the conversion of the Cervantes into the National Comedy Theatre in 1933 and Federico García Lorca's play Bodas de Sangre was staged there that year. It soon earned renown for its varied operettas and zarzuelas (many led by renowned Spanish theatre director Federico Moreno Torroba), as well as for special events, such as a 1939 production of Aida for the benefit of Spanish charities dealing with the aftermath of that country's Civil War.

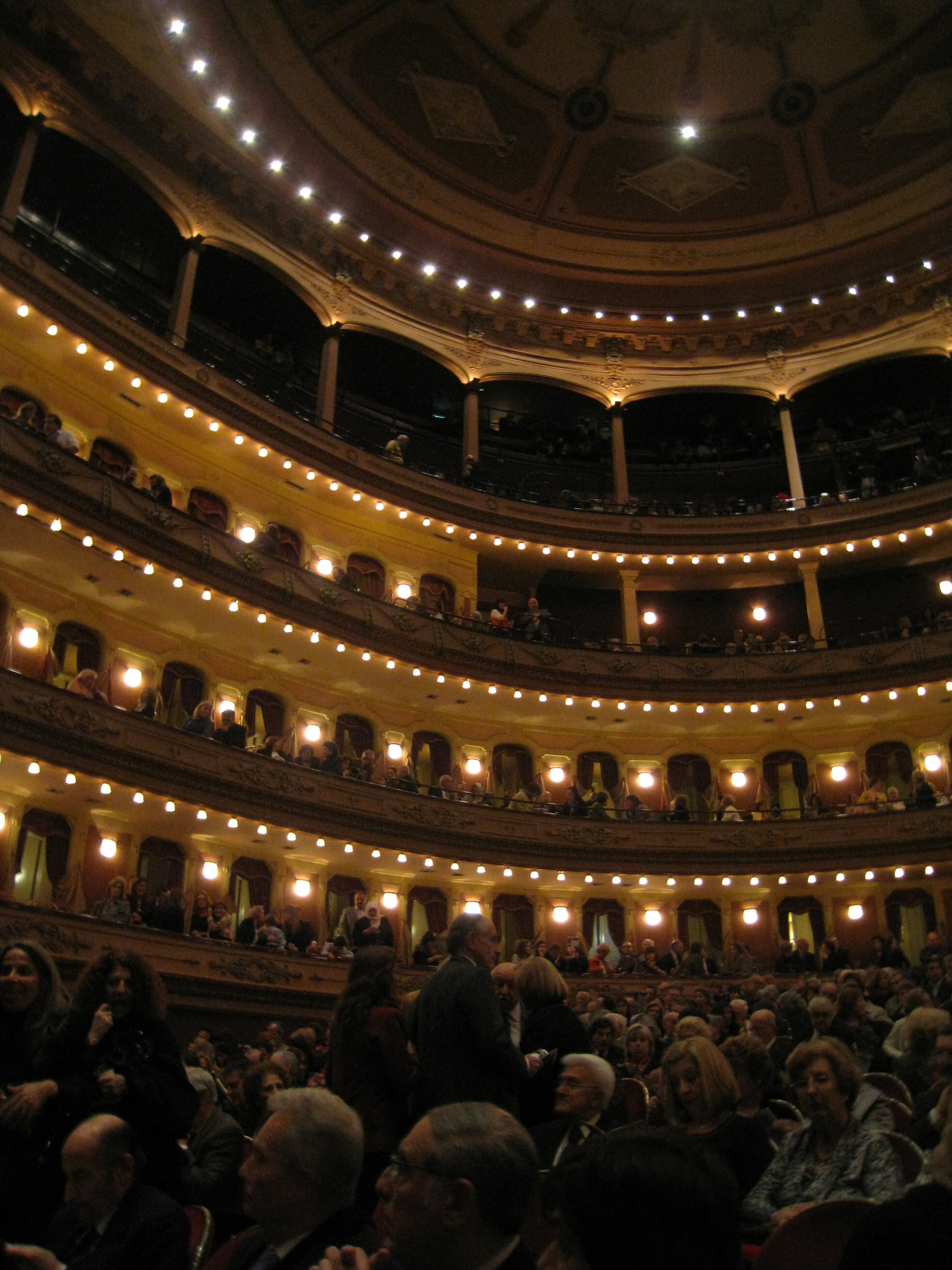
Main auditorium

The production of Spanish theatre at the Avenida declined after 1960, and the Avenida turned to Broadway theatre productions instead. One early success was the local 1963 production of Cole Porter's Kiss Me, Kate. Varying its repertoire, the Avenida featured a production of Giuseppe Verdi's La Traviata in 1967 and the theatre's purchase by local impresario Faustino García helped lead to Moreno Torroba's return in 1970 and a revival of the Avenida's erstwhile standby, the zarzuela, during that decade.

The advent of Argentina's last military dictatorship in 1976 led to an abrupt decline in local theatre activity, leading to the Avenida's closure in 1977. A 1979 fire nearly destroyed the Avenida, and the theatre remained shuttered until its reopening on 19 June 1994. However, the original building's top section, which included the former Hotel Castilla, were not restored.

With the closure of the city's Teatro Colón, which started refurbishment in October 2006, the Avenida picked up its classical opera programming, and in the past few years both Buenos Aires Lírica alongside Juventus Lírica, consisting mostly of promising young voices, staged humble productions of major titles such as Puccini's Madama Butterfly, Bizet's Carmen, Verdi's Aida and La Traviata, Mozart's The Magic Flute and The Marriage of Figaro, Rossini's The Barber of Seville, amongst others.
