= Bocanada =

Studio album by Gustavo Cerati
- Released: 28 June 1999
- Recorded: 1998–1999
- Studios: Casa Submarina (Buenos Aires); Abbey Road Studios (London)
- Genres: Dream pop; trip hop; psychedelia; art rock; downtempo
- Length: 69:19
- Label: BMG International
- Producer: Gustavo Cerati

Gustavo Cerati chronology
Amor Amarillo (1993)	Bocanada (1999)	Siempre es Hoy (2002)

Singles from Bocanada
- 1. "Raíz" Released: May 1999; 2. "Puente" Released: August 1999; 3. "Paseo Inmoral" Released: November 1999; 4. "Tabú" Released: February 2000; 5. "Engaña" Released: June 2000; 6. "Río Babel" Released: October 2000

Professional ratings
Review scores
Source	Rating
AllMusic	4.5/5 stars

Bocanada (Spanish for "Puff") is the second solo album by Argentine musician Gustavo Cerati, released by BMG International on 28 June 1999. Widely regarded by critics and fans as a highlight of Cerati's career, it was ranked by Rolling Stone as the second-greatest Latin rock album of all time. It was his first album following the breakup of Soda Stereo and was recorded after his involvement with the electronic music projects Plan V and Ocio. "Raíz" was the first track from the album to receive radio airplay, while "Puente" was the first to be released as a music video. Bocanada received more music videos than any of Cerati's other albums up to that point.

== Background ==
During the final years of Soda Stereo, as tensions within the band became increasingly apparent and their breakup approached, Gustavo Cerati released his first solo studio album, Amor Amarillo (1993). He described it as a "very impulsive [but] not premeditated" project and stated at the time that he had no plans to pursue a solo career. Cerati later explained that his solo releases before Bocanada had been made purely for "pleasure," as he considered his career already established through Soda Stereo. Nevertheless, while working on Amor Amarillo, he began setting aside ideas for Bocanada, describing "Pulsar" as "the starting point of Bocanada." Following Soda Stereo's breakup and farewell tour, El último concierto, in 1997, Cerati began pursuing a solo career more deliberately. He subsequently regarded Bocanada as his "first solo album," distinguishing it from his earlier releases.

== Recording ==
On Bocanada, Cerati takes a turn towards electronic music, with most of the sound being trip hop, downtempo, and neo-psychedelia. In line with other genre pioneers like Massive Attack and Portishead, many of the songs use one or more samples from various artists. Despite the overall electronic sound, the album's most recognizable single, "Puente," is one of the few songs that eschews electronic music as its foundation, instead featuring a more conventional pop-rock sound. Around the time of Soda Stereo's breakup, Cerati had already composed songs with electronic sounds and using computers, some of which ended up on this album. The album was largely created using an Akai MPC, which was essential for the sampling and composition process. These samples were also processed through a MIDI mutator, and he considered these new computerized elements as important to the production as the guitar. Flavio Etcheto, artist and musician, assisted Cerati in essential ways. He participated in all the songs and co-wrote "Alma" and "Perdonar es divino," in addition to contributing loops, samples, and backing vocals. He also acted as an organizer and advisor for Cerati in the formation of his first solo band.

Cerati used the software Pro Tools to create the album, commenting:

“This album involved a deeper understanding of the computer. I was able to get more out of it. Until Amor Amarillo, I was working without a computer. But when I bought the Macintosh, I started experimenting, and by Sueño Stereo, many of the arrangements were created entirely within the machine. The idea behind that album was "let's put everything into the computer"; it's a natural reaction when you encounter a system and think, "What an incredible number of possibilities!" However, I also noticed that this abundance of possibilities complicates things when you have to make a decision. What's the most creative approach? To choose a couple of things and develop an idea from there.”

— Gustavo Cerati

== Composition ==
Bocanada opens with “Tabú” which introduces sounds with electronica, sampledelia and jazz elements. It demonstrates the ability and prose of the recording techniques and structures of the songs, as proven with “Puente”, an alternative rock and electronica song with a pop sensibility that stretches to other songs on the album. This album also shows Cerati’s desire to explore electronic music as a whole. Bocanada is mainly a dream pop, trip hop, psychedelia and electronica album with strong influences from art rock and downtempo. Other genres appear as influence such as sampledelia, breakbeat, plunderphonics and jazz.

== Track listing ==
All songs written by Gustavo Cerati, except where noted.

No.	Title	Writer(s)	Length
1.	"Tabú" (Taboo)		4:47
2.	"Engaña" (It Deceives)		4:12
3.	"Bocanada" (Puff)	Cerati, Pablo Chaijale	4:07
4.	"Puente" (Bridge)		4:33
5.	"Río Babel" (Babel River)		4:44
6.	"Beautiful"		6:13
7.	"Perdonar es Divino" (Forgiveness is Divine)	Cerati, Flavio Etcheto	5:19
8.	"Verbo Carne" (Flesh Verb)		4:42
9.	"Raíz" (Root)		4:04
10.	"Y Si El Humo Está en Foco..." (And If the Smoke Is in Focus...)		4:56
11.	"Paseo Inmoral" (Immoral Stroll)	Cerati, Francisco Bochatón	5:31
12.	"Aquí & Ahora (Los Primeros Tres Minutos)" (Here & Now [The First Three Minutes])		3:54
13.	"Aquí & Ahora (Y Después)" (Here & Now [And After])		2:38
14.	"Alma" (Soul)	Cerati, Etcheto	4:38
15.	"Balsa" (Raft)		5:05
Total length:			69:23

== Personnel ==
- Gustavo Cerati - lead vocals, guitars, samplers, synthesizers, keyboards, bass guitar, effects, additional instruments, mixing, producer

Additional personnel

- Flavius Etcheto: Sampler in all tracks minus Raiz and Verbo Carne.
- Leo García: Sampler, Backing Vocals in Engaña, Puente and Aqui y Ahora.
- Martín Carrizo: drums.
- Fernando Nalé: Bass guitar in 4, 6, 11. Double Bass in 3, 5. Fretless bass in 13.
- Tweety González: Organ in Beautiful.
- Alejandro Terán: Arranger in Verbo Carne.
- Eduardo Bergallo: Engineer, mixing
- MacKinlay: Second engineer
- Eduardo Iencenella: Assistant
- Clive Goddard: Mixing
- Barry Woodward: Editor, The Townhouse, London
- Bunt Stafford-Clark: Mastering, The Townhouse, London
- Gaby Herbstein: Photography
- Oscar (Roho): Hairstyle
- Sofía Temperley: Photoshop
- ROS: Design direction

The London Session Orchestra

- Gavin Wright: Director
- Peter Cobbin: Engineer
- Joel Gregg: Assistant

== Charts ==
Chart performance for Bocanada
Chart (2025)	Peak position
Argentine Albums (CAPIF)	1

== Certifications ==
Region	Certification	Certified units/sales
Argentina (CAPIF)	Gold	30,000^{^}
Mexico (AMPROFON)	Gold	75,000^{‡}
United States (RIAA)	Gold (Latin)	30,000^{‡}
^{^} Shipments figures based on certification alone.^{‡} Sales+streaming figures based on certification alone.
