= Crimen (song) =

Single by Gustavo Cerati

from the album Ahí vamos
- Released: 2006
- Recorded: October 2005
- Genre: Pop rock; alternative rock
- Length: 3:48 (album version); 3:42 (radio edit)
- Label: Sony BMG
- Songwriter: Gustavo Cerati
- Producer: Gustavo Cerati

Gustavo Cerati singles chronology
| "Artefacto" (2003) | "Crimen" (2006) | "La excepción" (2006) |

"Crimen" (Spanish for Crime) is a song written and recorded by Argentine rock musician Gustavo Cerati. It is one of the most popular songs from his solo career and it's recognized as one of his signature songs. It was released as the twelfth track of the album Ahí vamos (Spanish for There we go), in 2006. The song won the Latin Grammy in 2007 and the MTV Awards in 2006 for Best Rock Song among other awards (See "Crimen" Awards).

== Lyric ==
"Crimen" has been considered one of the great Argentine rock ballads, along with songs such as Almendra's Muchacha (Ojos de papel).

== Music ==
"Crimen" is a slow-paced rock ballad. It begins with a piano, which was unprecedented in Cerati's career. Ironically, this ballad is a large part of what made the largely rock-oriented Ahí vamos so successful.

== Music video ==
The music video was directed by Joaquín Cambre, who also made the video for "Adiós". The video is set in the late 1940s, and Cerati opens saying: "Lately days and nights are too similar; if I've learned anything in this city it is that there are no guarantees; no one is giving away anything. Everything could turn out very badly ... but the case needed to be resolved. "

The video shows a nonlinear story that begins with the end: the discovery of the murder of a private detective (Gustavo Cerati) in his office, at dawn. Then back to the past, where the circumstances of the detective's death are explained. The night before, Cerati begins to investigate the private life of a beautiful and glamorous woman, on behalf of a client. He follows her to photograph evidence of her love affairs, and she catches him. Later in a bar, she seduces the detective in order to access the compromising photos. Both leave the place and drive to Cerati's office. Once there, she closes the door and shoots him repeatedly. The detective falls to the ground, dead, as the day begins to dawn. The video returns to a few seconds before the body was found in the opening sequence of the video (after the preface reported by Cerati).

The staging is highlighted by a game of contrasts between light and shadow, and mastery of blue tone. In addition, the video draws attention to Cerati's radically different hair style. Known for his ruffled curls, in the video Cerati has slicked-back hair, carefully combed to the right side.

== Use in media ==
"Crimen" was featured soundtrack of Chilean channel Canal 13's telenovela Soltera otra vez.

== Awards ==
Latin Grammy

- 2007 | Winner "Best Rock Song": "Crimen"

MTV Awards

- 2006 | Winner "Best Rock Song": "Crimen"
- 2006 | Nomination "Video of the Year": "Crimen"

Carlos Gardel

- 2007 | Winner "Song of the Year": "Crimen"
- 2007 | Winner "Best Music Video": "Crimen"
- 2007 | Winner "Interpretation of the Year": "Crimen"

Rock & Pop Awards

- 2007 | Winner "Live Performance of the Year": "Crimen"
- 2007 | Nomination "Best Music Video": "Crimen"
