= Leo García (singer) =

Argentine singer (born 1971)

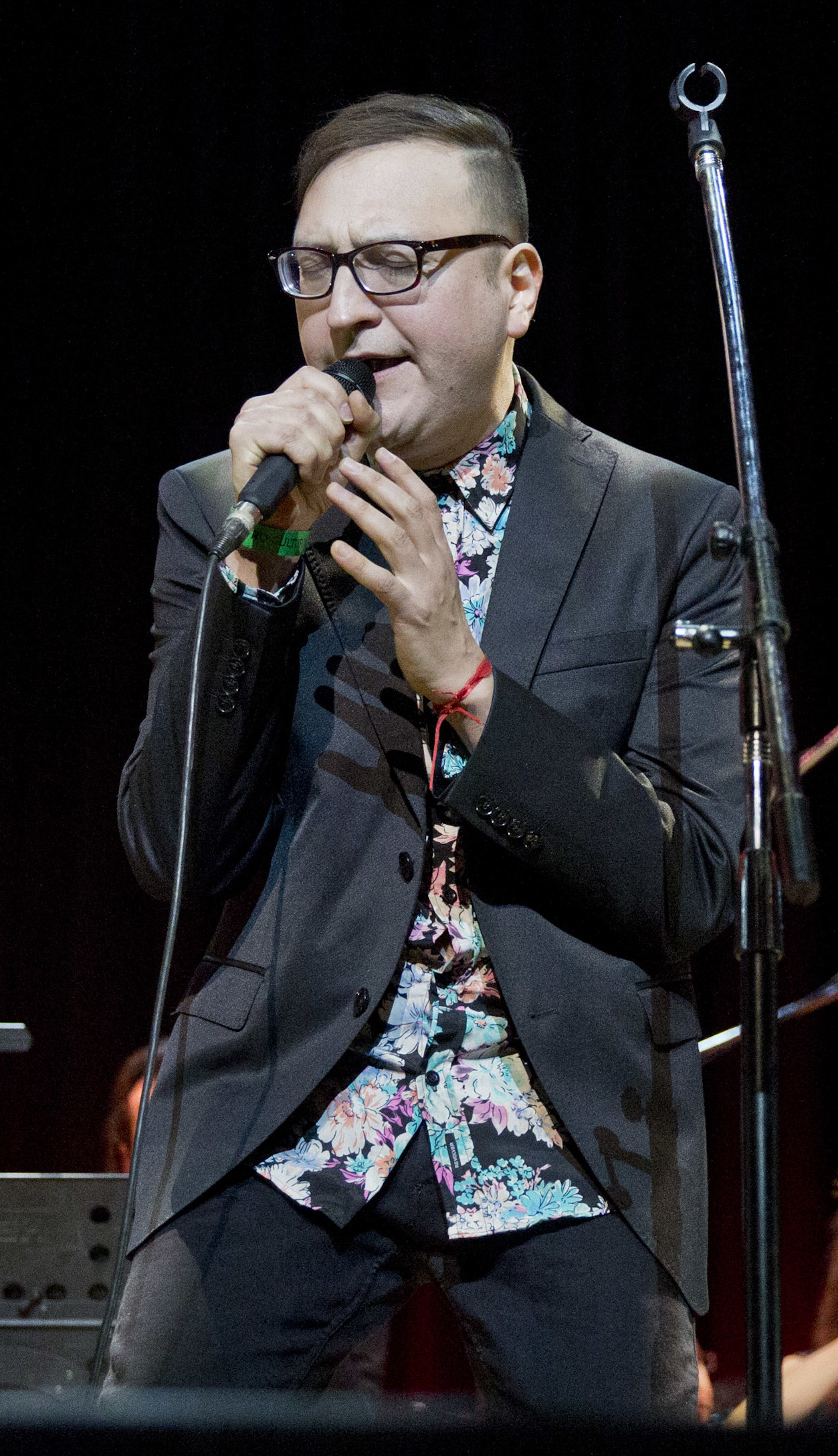

Background information
- Birth name: Leonardo Damián García
- Born: 31 August 1971 (age 53); Moreno, Buenos Aires, Argentina
- Origin: Argentina
- Genres: Rock, pop rock, electronic
- Occupation(s): Singer, musician, songwriter and disc jockey
- Instrument(s): Vocals and guitar
- Years active: 1987–present

Leonardo Damián García (born Moreno, Buenos Aires, 31 August 1971) is an Argentine singer.

== Discography ==
- 1994 – Entre Rosas – Avant Press EP
- 1996 – Avant Press] – Avant Press
- 1998 – Boutique – Avant Press (inédito)
- 1999 – Vital
- 2000 – Clap Beat
- 2000 – Rascacielos EP – Camote galáctico con Gustavo Lamas
- 2000 – Morrisey EP
- 2001 – Mar
- 2001 – Brat Davis EP
- 2003 – Vos
- 2005 – Cuarto creciente
- 2008 – El Milagro del Pop
- 2009 – El Milagro Dance]
- 2010 – Común y Especial
- 2013 – Algo real
