= Amor Amarillo =

Amor amarillo
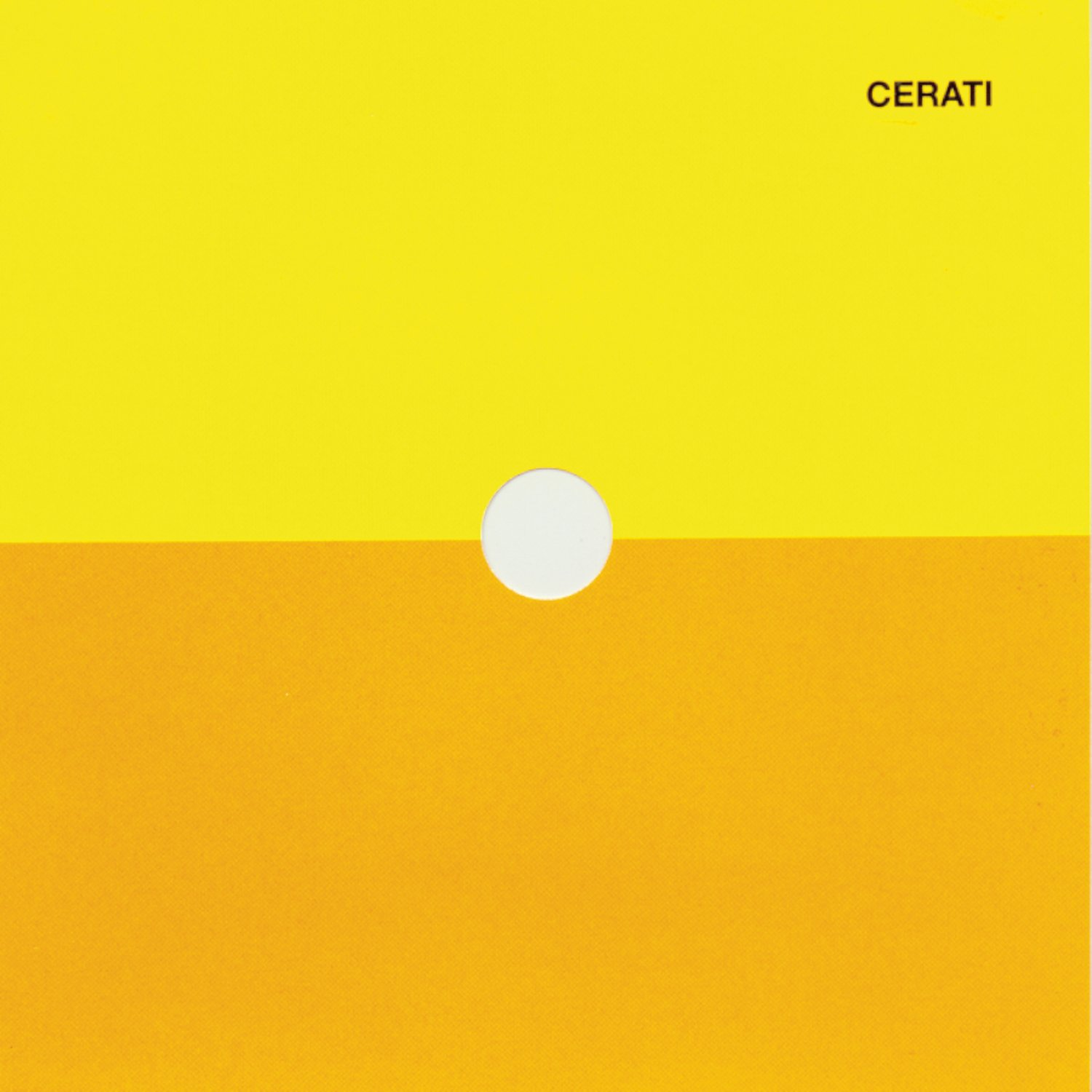

Studio album by Gustavo Cerati
- Released: 1 November 1993
- Recorded: 1992–1993
- Genres: Alternative rock, dream pop, pop rock, neo-psychedelia
- Label: RCA International
- Producers: Gustavo Cerati; Zeta Bosio

Gustavo Cerati chronology
Amor amarillo (1993)	Bocanada (1999)

Singles from Amor amarillo
- 1. "Te llevo para que me lleves" Released: 1993; 2. "Pulsar" Released: 1993; 3. "Lisa" Released: 1994

Professional ratings
Review scores
Source	Rating
Allmusic	3.5/5 stars

Amor Amarillo (Spanish for "Yellow Love") is the debut solo album by Argentine rock musician Gustavo Cerati, recorded as a side project while he was still a member of Soda Stereo.

Amor Amarillo was released on November 1, 1993, during a period of tensions within Soda Stereo. Cerati considered it an intimate album, and its only official presentation was an acoustic performance for FM 100 in 1994. His wife, Cecilia Amenábar, contributed to the album and served as its primary inspiration, alongside the anticipation of the couple's first child. The album features a cover of Luis Alberto Spinetta's "Bajan," originally released on Artaud. "Crema de estrellas," which later appeared on Soda Stereo's Sueño Stereo, was among the songs omitted from the album.

== Recording ==
Following the tour for Soda Stereo's album Dynamo, Gustavo Cerati took a break from the band and moved with his wife to Santiago, Chile, to await the birth of his first child. During this period, he began writing material for what would become his debut solo album. Initial versions of the songs were recorded in a home studio he established at their residence in the Providencia commune, which he named Ámbar Studios. The album was subsequently completed and mixed in Buenos Aires and released 25 days before the birth of his son, Benito Cerati.

== Name ==
According to Cecilia, the album's title was inspired by yellow stones that the couple collected on the beaches of Los Roques during a break in Soda Stereo's Venezuelan tour for Dynamo. Cerati associated the stones' color with energy and the sun, which he considered symbolic of their love.

== Track listing ==
All songs written by Gustavo Cerati, except where noted.

No.	Title	Writer(s)	Note(s)	Length
1.	"Amor amarillo" (Yellow Love)			5:39
2.	"Lisa"			4:28
3.	"Te llevo para que me lleves" (I Take You So You Can Take Me)		Cerati sings a duet with Cecilia Amenábar.	3:44
4.	"Pulsar" (Pulsate)			4:57
5.	"Cabeza de Medusa" (Medusa Head)			5:11
6.	"Avenida alcorta" (Alcorta Avenue)			4:46
7.	"Bajan" ([They] Go Down)	Luis Alberto Spinetta	This track covers a song originally released as part of the album Artaud by Pescado Rabioso, written by Spinetta.	4:12
8.	"Rombos" (Diamonds)			4:25
9.	"Ahora es nunca" (Now is Never)	Cerati, Cecilia Amenábar		4:45
10.	"A Merced" (At Mercy)			6:28
11.	"Torteval" (Released exclusively on the first and third issues of the album.)			6:05
Total length:				54:40

Samples

- "Pulsar" contains samples from "Microphone Poet" by Rob'n'Raz ft. Papa Dee and "Sirius" by The Alan Parsons Project.
- "Rombos" contains a sample from "Texture" by Catherine Wheel.
- "Torteval" contains samples from "Impeach the President" by The Honeydrippers and "You Got the Love" by Rufus ft. Chaka Khan.

== Videoclips ==
- «Te llevo para que me lleves» (1993)
- «Pulsar» (1993)
- «Lisa» (1994)
- «Amor amarillo» (2023)
- «Rombos» (2023)
- «Av. Alcorta» (2023)

== Personnel ==
- Gustavo Cerati - lead vocals, guitars, backing vocals, fretless bass guitar, MPC60, keyboards, wind instrument, effects, percussion and producer.
- Zeta Bosio - keyboards, percussion, bass on "Amor Amarillo" and producer.
- Cecilia Amenábar - vocals, backing vocals, bass on "A Merced".
- Tweety González - programming assistance and audio consultant.

Produced by Gustavo Cerati and Zeta Bosio.

== Certifications ==
Region	Certification	Certified units/sales
Argentina (CAPIF)	Platinum	60,000^{^}
United States (RIAA)	Gold (Latin)	30,000^{‡}
^{^} Shipments figures based on certification alone.^{‡} Sales+streaming figures based on certification alone.
