= Ahí vamos =

Studio album by Gustavo Cerati
- Released: 4 April 2006
- Recorded: October 2005; Unísono (Argentina) Buenos Aires; Masterdisk (United States) New York City, New York
- Genres: Alternative rock, power pop, pop rock, post-grunge, hard rock
- Length: 56:34
- Language: Spanish
- Label: Sony BMG
- Producers: Gustavo Cerati; Tweety González

Gustavo Cerati chronology
Siempre es hoy (2002)	Ahí vamos (2006)	Fuerza natural (2009)

Singles from Ahí vamos
- 1. "Crimen"; 2. "La Excepción"; 3. "Adiós"; 4. "Lago en el Cielo"; 5. "Me Quedo Aquí"

Professional ratings
Review scores
Source	Rating
Allmusic	4/5 stars

Ahí Vamos (Spanish for "There We Go") is the fourth solo studio album by Argentine rock musician Gustavo Cerati, released in 2006. It received positive reviews from critics and achieved commercial success, particularly in Venezuela, Argentina, Chile, Colombia and Mexico. The lead single, "Crimen," began receiving radio airplay in April 2006 and became popular throughout Latin America and Spain. The second single, "La Excepción," was released in September that year. The album was certified Platinum in Argentina based solely on pre-orders and received a gold certification in Mexico.

At the 2006 Latin Grammy Awards, Ahí Vamos won Best Rock Solo Vocal Album, while its single "Crimen" received the award for Best Rock Song. The album was also nominated for Album of the Year but lost to Shakira's Fijación Oral Vol. 1, on which Cerati also appeared.

The album's third single, "Adiós," began receiving radio and television airplay across Latin America in February 2007. Two further singles followed in 2008: "Lago En El Cielo" and "Me Quedo Aquí.”

Cerati toured Latin America, Spain and the United States to promote the album. He also made his London debut, performing at the Forum.

The title "Ahí Vamos" ("There We Go") originated from a phrase frequently repeated during the recording sessions, which became a kind of rallying cry for Cerati.

On August 29, 2007, the album's second single "La Excepción" received two Latin Grammy nominations: Record of the Year and Best Rock Song. It won the latter award, competing against entries by Argentine band La Renga and Uruguayan band Cuarteto de nos, among others.

== Track listing ==
No.	Title	Writer(s)	Length
1.	"Al fin sucede" (It Finally Happens)	Gustavo Cerati	3:38
2.	"La excepción" (The Exception)	Cerati	4:21
3.	"Uno entre 1000" (One in a Thousand)	Cerati - Richard Coleman	4:10
4.	"Caravana" (Caravan)	Cerati - Coleman	4:00
5.	"Adiós" (Goodbye)	Cerati - Benito Cerati	3:55
6.	"Me quedo aquí" (I'll Stay Here)	Cerati	3:40
7.	"Lago en el cielo" (Lake in Heaven)	Cerati	5:12
8.	"Dios nos libre" (God Save Us)	Cerati - Coleman	4:35
9.	"Otra Piel" (Another Skin)	Cerati	4:43
10.	"Médium" (Medium)	Cerati	5:35
11.	"Bomba de Tiempo" (Time Bomb)	Cerati	5:21
12.	"Crimen" (Crime)	Cerati	3:55
13.	"Jugo de luna" (Moon Juice)	Cerati	3:54
Total length:			56:59

== Charts ==
Weekly chart performance for Ahí vamos
Chart (2025)	Peak position
Argentine Albums (CAPIF)	1

== Sales and certifications ==
Region	Certification	Certified units/sales
Argentina (CAPIF)	Platinum	40,000^{^}
^{^} Shipments figures based on certification alone.

== Personnel ==
=== Performing ===
- Gustavo Cerati – lead vocals, backing vocals, lead guitar, bass, piano, kalimba, synthesizer, Moog synthesizer, programming, audio filtering
- Richard Coleman – guitar, effects
- Fernando Nalé – bass
- Leandro Fresco – backing vocals, synthesizer, percussion, strings, laptop
- Tweety González – Rhodes fuzz, organ, glockenspiel, piano, synthesizer
- Fernando Samalea – glockenspiel, drums, percussion, drums, octoban, rototom, tam-tam, bandoneón
- Emmanuel Cauvet – drums
- Pedro Moscuzza – drums
- Bolsa González – drums
- Flavius Etcheto – vocal effects
- Capri – synthesizer
- Loló Gasparini – backing vocals
- Paula Zotalis – backing vocals
- Sofía Medrano – ambient voices
- Dina – ambient voices

=== Technical ===
- Gustavo Cerati – record production, music supervision
- Tweety González – record production, sound recording
- Uriel Dorfman – sound recording
- Héctor Castillo – sound recording, audio mixing
- Nicolás "Parker" Pucci – production assistance
- Pablo Gándara – production assistance
- Howie Weinberg – audio mastering
- Bolsa González – drums advising
- Vasco – Pro Tools advising

=== Additional ===
- Ezequiel de San Pablo&Angeles Altoe;– graphic design
- Oscar Fernández – hair
- Jazmín Calcarami – makeup
- Santiago Contreras – photography, illustrations
- Germán Saez – photography
- Nora Lezano – photography
- Sebastián Arpesella – photography
- Gustavo Cerati&Angeles Altoe – illustrations
- Sofía Medrano – illustrations, wardrobe
- Mayol – wardrobe
