= Fuerza natural =

Studio album by Gustavo Cerati
- Released: 1 September 2009
- Genres: Indie rock, pop rock, indie folk, dream pop, alternative country
- Language: Spanish
- Label: Sony Music
- Producers: Gustavo Cerati; Tweety González

Gustavo Cerati chronology
Ahí vamos (2006)	Fuerza natural (2009)	Cerati Infinito (2015)

Professional ratings
Review scores
Source	Rating
Allmusic	3.5/5 stars

Fuerza natural (Spanish for "Natural Force") is the fifth and final solo studio album by Argentine musician Gustavo Cerati, released on September 1, 2009. The album incorporates folk influences, featuring acoustic guitars and mandolins. Fuerza Natural was certified gold in Argentina after selling 40,000 copies during its first week of release and reportedly sold 500.000 copies worldwide. In 2010, it won the Latin Grammy Award for Best Rock Album.

In May 2010, less than a year after the album's release, Cerati suffered a stroke following a concert in Caracas, Venezuela, which left him in a coma. He died on September 4, 2014.

== Track listing ==
No.	Title	Writer(s)	Note(s)	Length
1.	"Fuerza natural" (Natural Force)	Gustavo Cerati - Benito Cerati		4:49
2.	"Déjà vu"	Cerati		3:24
3.	"Magia" (Magic)	Cerati - Adrián Paoletti		4:28
4.	"Amor sin rodeos" (Love Without Detours)	Cerati - Paoletti		3:53
5.	"Tracción a sangre" (Blood Traction)	Cerati		4:16
6.	"Desastre" (Disaster)	Cerati - B. Cerati		3:36
7.	"Rapto" (Abduction)	Cerati - B. Cerati		3:56
8.	"Cactus"	Cerati		3:54
9.	"Naturaleza muerta" (Dead Nature)	Cerati - Richard Coleman		3:53
10.	"Dominó" (Domino)	Cerati - Coleman		3:18
11.	"Sal" (Salt)	Cerati - Paoletti - B. Cerati		4:17
12.	"Convoy"	Cerati		3:16
13.	"He visto a Lucy" (I Have Seen Lucy)	Cerati		5:31
14.	"# (Numeral)"	Cerati	Hidden track.	3:49
Total length:				56:11

== Performing ==
- Gustavo Cerati: lead vocals except on "Convoy", backing vocals, lead guitar, bass, synthesizer, Moog synthesizer, programming, audio filtering
- Gonzalo Córdoba: second guitar
- Leandro Fresco: piano
- Fernando Nalé: bass
- Fernando Samalea: drums
- Anita Álvarez de Toledo: backing vocals, lead vocals on "Convoy", featured vocals on "He Visto a Lucy"

== Guest musicians ==
- Richard Coleman: guitar

== Charts ==
Chart (2009)	Peak position
US Top Latin Albums (Billboard)	53
US Latin Pop Albums (Billboard)	10

== Certifications and sales ==
Region	Certification	Certified units/sales
Argentina (CAPIF)	Platinum	40,000^{^}
Mexico (AMPROFON)	Platinum	60,000^{‡}
^{^} Shipments figures based on certification alone.^{‡} Sales+streaming figures based on certification alone.
