= La Voz Argentina season 4 =

La Voz Argentina
- Season 4
- Hosted by: Marley; Rochi Igarzabal (Digital host)
- Coaches: Ricardo Montaner; Soledad Pastorutti; Mau y Ricky; Lali Espósito
- Winner: Yhosva Montoya
- Runner-up: Ángela Navarro

Release
- Original network: Telefe
- Original release: 5 June – 12 September 2022

Season chronology
- ← Previous; Season 3

The fourth season of La Voz Argentina premiered on 5 June 2022, on Telefe. Marley reprised his role as the host of the show, while singer and actress Rochi Igarzabal became the digital host.

Soledad Pastorutti, Ricardo Montaner, Mau y Ricky and Lali Espósito returned as coaches.

This season featured a new element: the Block. Added during the Blind auditions, this button allows the coach to block another one from getting an artist. Also, the number of team members was increased from 24 to 28 artists.

On 12 September, Yhosva Montoya was named winner of the season, marking Soledad Pastorutti's third win as a coach.

== Coaches and host ==
Season 4 coaches

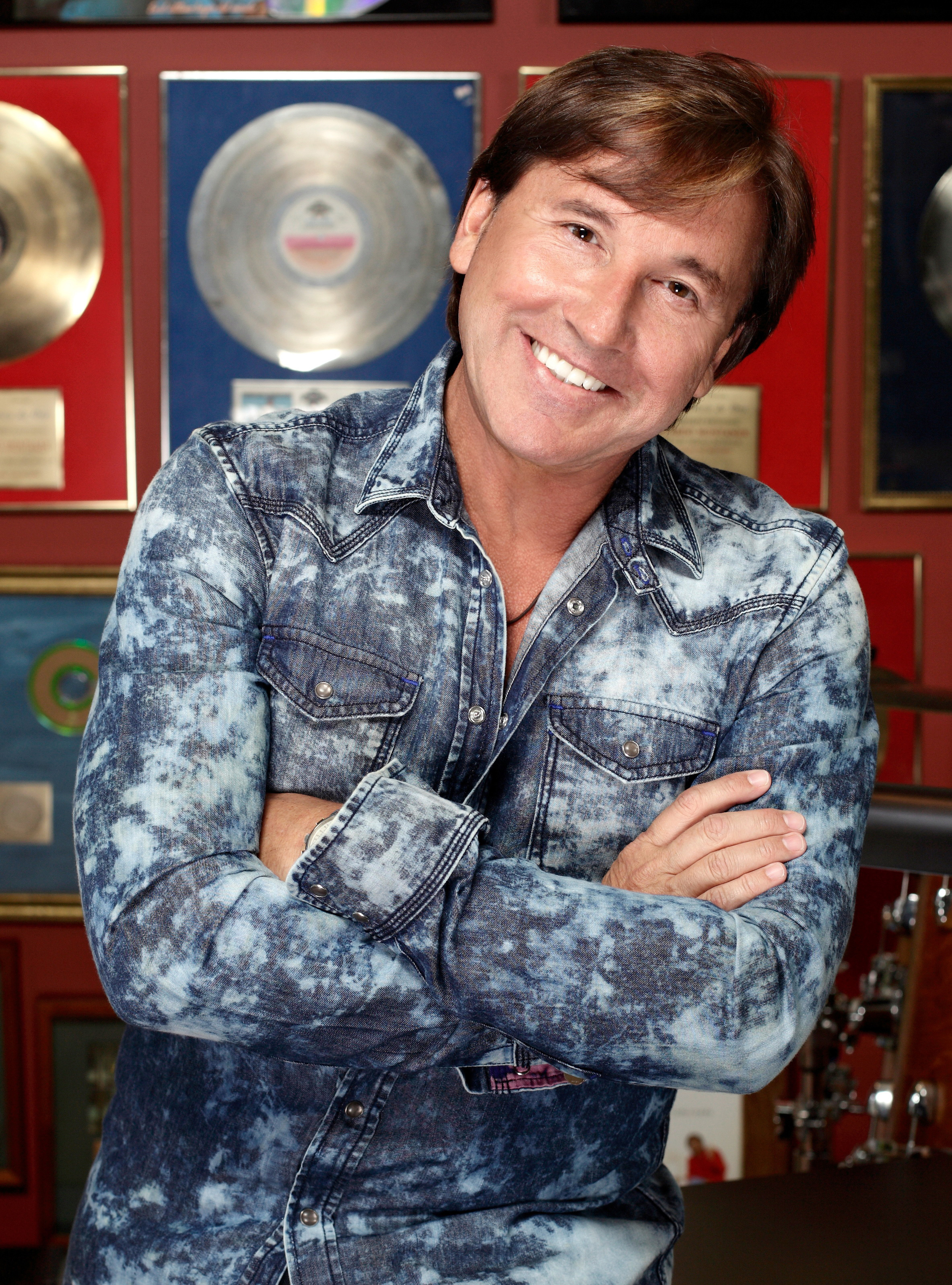
Montaner

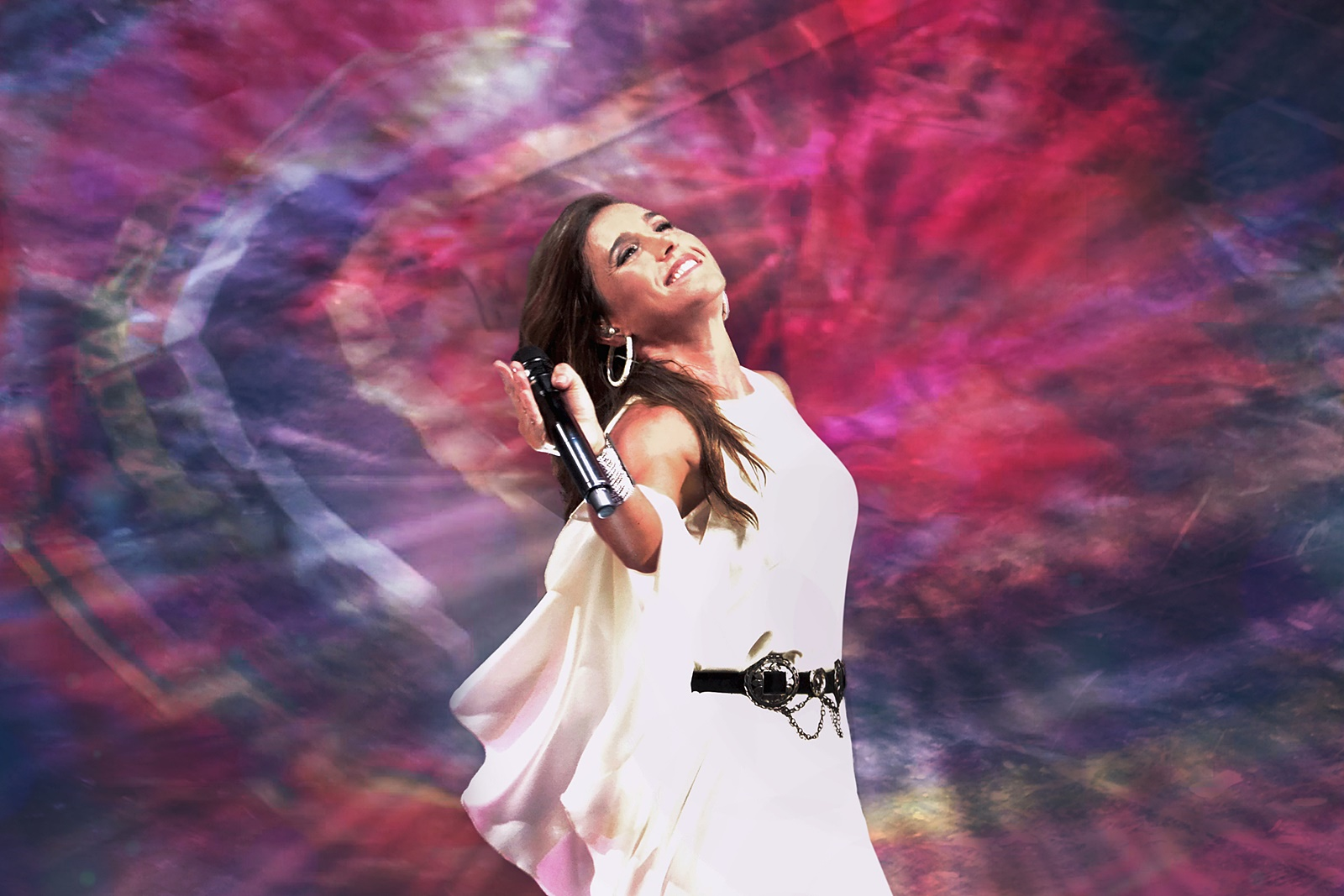
Soledad Pastorutti

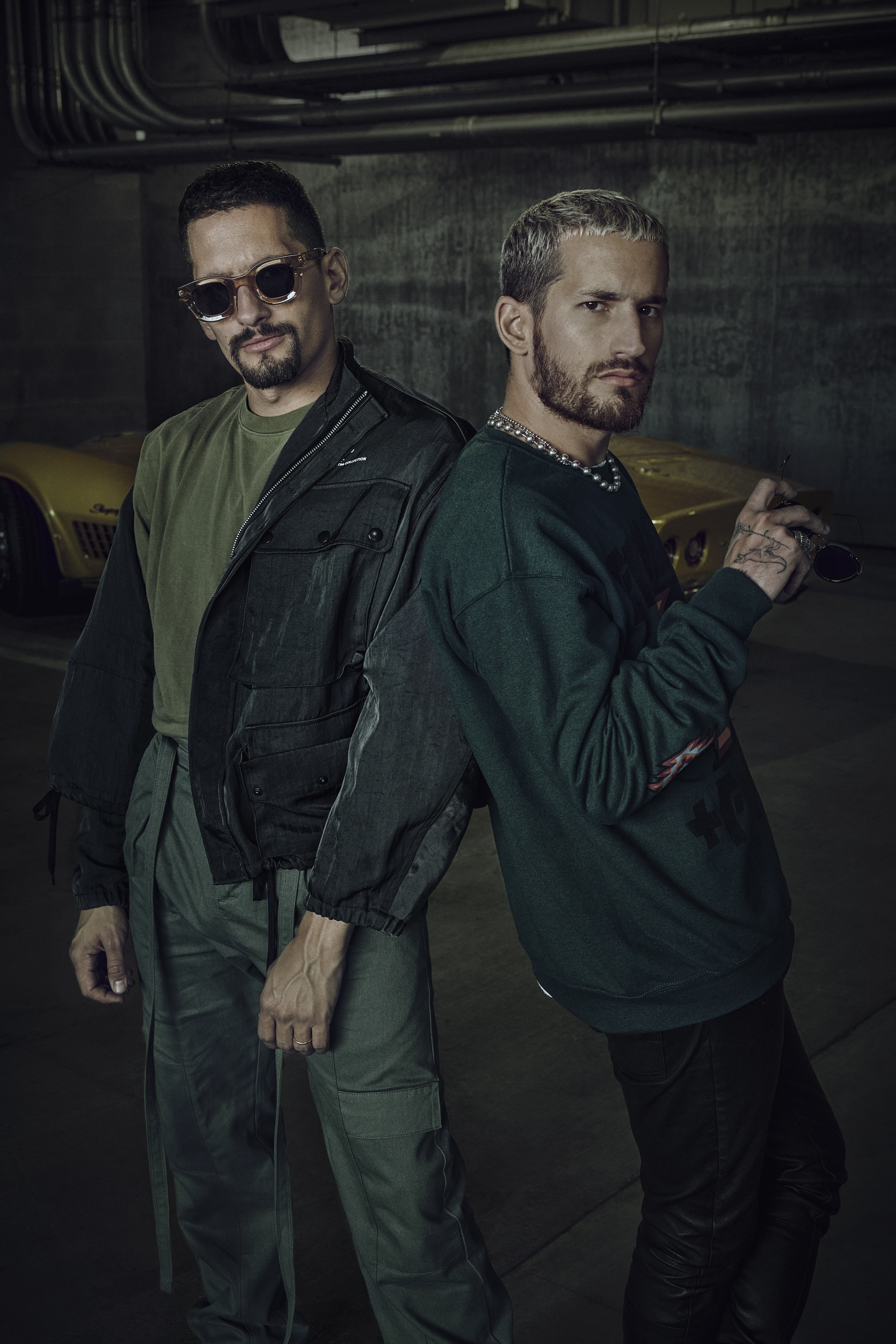
Mau y Ricky

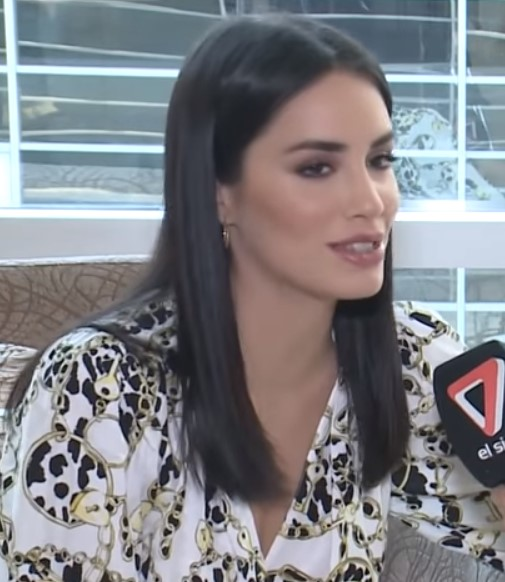
Lali

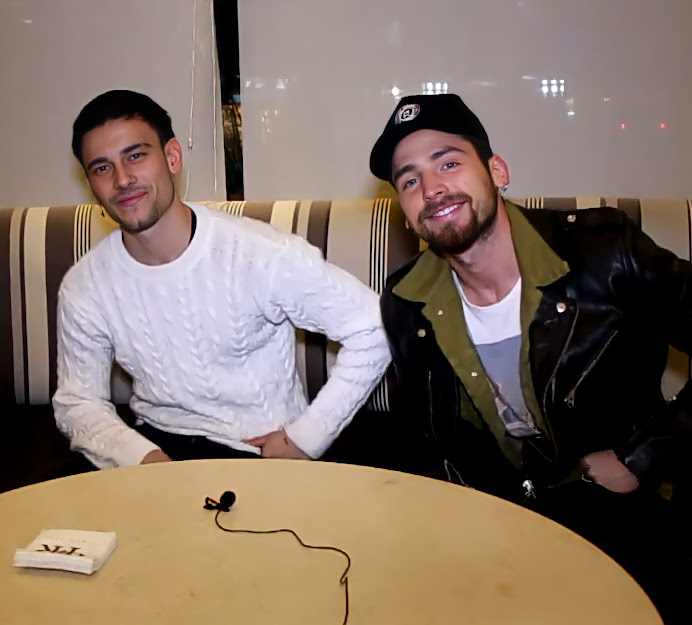
MYA

As in the previous season, Marley is the host of the show. This season introduced singer and actress Rochi Igarzabal as the digital host of the show. All four coaches from the previous season returned: Venezuelan-Argentine singer and songwriter Ricardo Montaner, folk singer Soledad Pastorutti, pop singer Lali Espósito, and Venezuelan Latin pop and reggaeton duo Mau y Ricky. In this season, it was announced that the fifth coach for "The Comeback Stage" would be the Argentine Latin pop duo MYA.

== Teams ==
Main Competition

- Winner
- Runner-up
- Third place
- Fourth place
- Eliminated in the Live shows
- Eliminated in the playoffs
- Eliminated but selected to compete in the Comeback stage
- Stolen in the Knockouts
- Eliminated in the Knockouts
- Stolen in the Battles
- Eliminated in the Battles

The Comeback Stage

- Joined another team
- Eliminated in the Finals
- Eliminated in the Knockouts
- Eliminated in the Second battles
- Eliminated in the First battles

Coaches	Top 124 artists				
Ricardo Montaner					
Ricardo Montaner	Elías Pardal	Naiquén Galizio	Emanuel Cerrudo	Julia Ferrón	Leonardo Jurado
Ricardo Montaner	Alejo Álvarez	Dandara Guinaraes	Julieta Céliz	Sofía Maquieira	Julio García
Ricardo Montaner	Julieta Silberberg	~~Olivia Cuan~~	~~Andrés Cantos~~	~~Mauricio Lastra~~	Eliana Carletta
Ricardo Montaner	Aneley Mattei	Valentina & Emilia Crocitta	Amandicia	Adrián Ocampo	~~Juan Manuel Rubino~~
Ricardo Montaner	Sofía Schiaffino	Elías Muñoz	Victoria Méndez Bello	Pablo García	Franco Casañas
Ricardo Montaner	Brian Sáez	Nicolás Pagnucco	Lilian Mollo	Michelle Alifano	Nuria Dutour
Ricardo Montaner	Soledad Cabrera	Pablo Campos	Alejandro Cena		
Soledad Pastorutti					
Soledad Pastorutti	Yhosva Montoya	Martín Ronconi	Damián Ayala	Huilén Currá	Ignacio Pereira
Soledad Pastorutti	Luciana Araya	Belén del Greco	Alfredo Oviedo	Santiago Quiroz	Juan Manuel González Mir
Soledad Pastorutti	~~Iván Papetti~~	~~Marco Díaz~~	~~Naiquén Galizio~~	Nicolás Reartes	Nicolás Olivieri
Soledad Pastorutti	Andrea Guasch	Carolina Diblasi	Camila Matarazzo	~~Octavio Muratore~~	~~Ezequiel Romano~~
Soledad Pastorutti	Ana & Milagros Oviedo	María del Rosario Escobar	Soledad Gilabert	Emilia Oliveras	Celeste Martino
Soledad Pastorutti	Javier Sosa	Axel Riquelmes	Morena Pereyra	Esteban Muia	Quique Montes
Soledad Pastorutti	Javier Mandatori	Ayelén & Federico López			
Mau y Ricky					
Mau y Ricky	Iván Papetti	Cecilia Mirabile	Francisco Escudero	Octavio Muratore	Juana Bestard Pino
Mau y Ricky	Jazmín Sparta	Morena López Díaz	Stefano Marocco	Micaela Sotera	Olivia Cuan
Mau y Ricky	~~Alfredo Oviedo~~	~~Julieta Céliz~~	~~Renato Barbieri~~	~~Juan Manuel González Mir~~	Ignacio Aguirre
Mau y Ricky	Florencia & Verónica Soaje	Daiana Carrizo	Ezequiel Romano	~~Aneley Mattei~~	~~Luzía Cavallini~~
Mau y Ricky	~~Josefina Zaurdo~~	~~Amandicia~~	~~Polina Piskova~~	Gastón Bell	Bernardita Sonzini
Mau y Ricky	Nicolás Bosetti	Julián Gallo	Margarita Bullrich	Victoria Cuello	Sabrina Carbonel
Mau y Ricky	Johan Ruíz	Melibea Mauriz			
Lali Espósito					
Lali Espósito	Ángela Navarro	Tomás Sagués	Emilia Soler	Juan Manuel Godoy	Renato Barbieri
Lali Espósito	Andrés Cantos	Luzía Cavallini	Florencia Bonavida	Vanesa Magnago	Thomas Spagnol
Lali Espósito	~~Julieta Silberberg~~	Florencia Ronconi	Estef Figueroa	Yanela Toscano	Lucas Bongiovanni
Lali Espósito	Lucía Gutiérrez Escribano	Hugo Ruíz Romero	Josefina Zaurdo	~~Iván Papetti~~	~~Belén del Greco~~
Lali Espósito	~~Salustiano Zavalía~~	Tomás Barani	Elena Guarner	Nicolás Robul	Micaela Sabra
Lali Espósito	Vanesa Henríquez	Adrián Alexandre Tapia	Camila Pérez	Ramiro Carballeda	Luis Aberastain
Lali Espósito	Mora Rivarola	Sofía Brown			
MYA (Comeback Stage)					
MYA (Comeback Stage)	Naiquén Galizio	Isabella Bistmans	Polina Piskova	Marco Díaz	Mauricio Lastra
MYA (Comeback Stage)	María Eugenia Meizoso	Victoria Fernández	José Moncada Márquez	Juan Manuel Rubino	Iván Gette
MYA (Comeback Stage)	Maira Rossetto	Salustiano Zavalía	Ezequiel Hernández	Ornela Taffarel	Jonatan Olivera
MYA (Comeback Stage)	Gonzalo Cepeda	Martín Taormina	Elías Perea		
Note: Italicized names are stolen artists (names struck through within former teams). The underlined name is "The Comeback Stage" winner, who joined another team of their choice.

== Blind auditions ==
Blind auditions color key
✔	Coach hit his/her "QUIERO TU VOZ" button
	Artist defaulted to this coach's team
	Artist elected to join this coach's team
	Artist was eliminated with no coach pressing their button
	Artist was eliminated and was not invited back for "The Comeback Stage"
✘	Coach pressed the "I WANT YOU" button, but was blocked by Montaner from getting the artist
✘	Coach pressed the "I WANT YOU" button, but was blocked by Soledad from getting the artist
✘	Coach pressed the "I WANT YOU" button, but was blocked by Mau & Ricky from getting the artist
✘	Coach pressed the "I WANT YOU" button, but was blocked by Lali from getting the artist

Blind auditions results
Episode	Order	Artist	Age	Hometown	Song	Coach's and artist's choices			
Episode	Order	Artist	Age	Hometown	Song	Montaner	Soledad	Mau & Ricky	Lali
Episode 1 (Sunday, 5 June)
Episode 1 (Sunday, 5 June)	1	Cecilia Mirabile	25	Juana Koslay, San Luis	"Rise Up"	✔	✔	✔	✔
Episode 1 (Sunday, 5 June)	2	Tomás Sagués	23	Bella Vista, Buenos Aires	"Entre Nosotros"	✔	✔	✘	✔
Episode 1 (Sunday, 5 June)	3	Pablo Campos	42	Chivilcoy, Buenos Aires	"María Va"	✔	✔	—	—
Episode 1 (Sunday, 5 June)	4	Bianca Cuscuna	23	GBA, Buenos Aires	"Blank Space"	—	—	—	—
Episode 1 (Sunday, 5 June)	5	Luciana Araya	25	San Salvador de Jujuy, Jujuy	"Me Vas a Extrañar"	✔	✔	—	—
Episode 1 (Sunday, 5 June)	6	Pedro Stratta	23	Santa Fe, Santa Fe	"11 y 6"	—	—	—	—
Episode 1 (Sunday, 5 June)	7	Estef Figueroa	34	Lanús, Buenos Aires	"Sweet Dreams, TN"	✔	—	✔	✔
Episode 2 (Monday, 6 June)
Episode 2 (Monday, 6 June)	1	Dandara Guinaraes	18	San Juan, San Juan	"Jealous"	✔	✔	✘	✔
Episode 2 (Monday, 6 June)	2	Esteban Ríos	28	Coronel Vidal, Buenos Aires	"Mis Sueños"	—	—	—	—
Episode 2 (Monday, 6 June)	3	Martín Ronconi	42	El Palomar, Buenos Aires	"Pride and Joy"	—	✔	—	—
Episode 2 (Monday, 6 June)	4	Florencia Ronconi	18	El Palomar, Buenos Aires	"Mujer Amante"	—	—	—	✔
Episode 2 (Monday, 6 June)	5	Elías Perea	31	Merlo, Buenos Aires	"El Perdón"	—	—	—	—
Episode 2 (Monday, 6 June)	6	Florencia Peruchín	18	Río Cuarto, Córdoba	"Antes de Ti"	—	—	—	—
Episode 2 (Monday, 6 June)	7	Daiana Carrizo	20	Monte Castro, Buenos Aires	"Acaramelao"	✔	—	✔	—
Episode 3 (Tuesday, 7 June)
Episode 3 (Tuesday, 7 June)	1	Lucas Bongiovanni	29	San Juan, San Juan	"Plush"	—	✔	—	✔
Episode 3 (Tuesday, 7 June)	2	Manuel Alonso	18	La Plata, Buenos Aires	"Volaré"	—	—	—	—
Episode 3 (Tuesday, 7 June)	3	Polina Piskova	26	Moscow, Russia	"Seven Nation Army"	✔	✔	✔	✔
Episode 3 (Tuesday, 7 June)	4	Ignacio Vivaldo	24	Ezeiza, Buenos Aires	"Maldito Duende"	—	—	—	—
Episode 3 (Tuesday, 7 June)	5	Octavio Muratore	21	Sgo del Estero, Sgo del Estero	"La Invitación"	✔	✔	✔	✔
Episode 3 (Tuesday, 7 June)	6	Priscila Lamas	24	Caleta Olivia, Santa Cruz	"Don't Know Why"	—	—	—	—
Episode 3 (Tuesday, 7 June)	7	Soledad Cabrera	39	Florida, Buenos Aires	"Sweet Dreams (Are Made of This)"	✔	—	✔	—
Episode 4 (Wednesday, 8 June)
Episode 4 (Wednesday, 8 June)	1	Damián Ayala	24	Rosario, Santa Fe	"Me Muero Lejos de Ti"	✔	✔	✔	✔
Episode 4 (Wednesday, 8 June)	2	Isabella Bistmans	18	Villa del Parque, Buenos Aires	"Eres Para Mí"	—	—	—	—
Episode 4 (Wednesday, 8 June)	3	Salustiano Zavalía	27	Salta, Salta	"Diva"	—	✔	✔	✔
Episode 4 (Wednesday, 8 June)	4	Carla Perillo	20	Concordia, Entre Ríos	"Rolling in the Deep"	—	—	—	—
Episode 4 (Wednesday, 8 June)	5	Franco Casañas	33	Córdoba, Córdoba	"Oye"	✔	✔	—	—
Episode 4 (Wednesday, 8 June)	6	Ignacio Aguirre	23	La Falda, Córdoba	"Riptide"	✔	—	✔	—
Episode 4 (Wednesday, 8 June)	7	Rodrigo Giménez	41	Las Tunas, Buenos Aires	"Porque Yo Te Amo"	—	—	—	—
Episode 5 (Thursday, 9 June)
Episode 5 (Thursday, 9 June)	1	Renato Barbieri	25	La Carlota, Córdoba	"Cheques"	✔	✔	✔	✔
Episode 5 (Thursday, 9 June)	2	Lourdes Carollo	24	Villa Devoto, Buenos Aires	"Out Here on My Own"	—	—	—	—
Episode 5 (Thursday, 9 June)	3	Ignacio Pereira	34	San Martín, Buenos Aires	"La Mano de Dios"	✔	✔	—	—
Episode 5 (Thursday, 9 June)	4	Nicolás Pagnucco	28	Córdoba, Córdoba	"Cuando Te Enamores"	✔	—	—	—
Episode 5 (Thursday, 9 June)	5	Milagros Coronel	29	Bragado, Buenos Aires	"Nada Tengo de Ti"	—	—	—	—
Episode 5 (Thursday, 9 June)	6	Camila Pérez	19	Martínez, Buenos Aires	"Bridge over Troubled Water"	✔	—	✔	✔
Episode 5 (Thursday, 9 June)	7	Franco Llosas	28	La Falda, Córdoba	"Se Parece Más a Ti"	—	—	—	—
Episode 6 (Sunday, 12 June)
Episode 6 (Sunday, 12 June)	1	Yanela Toscano	34	Avellaneda, Buenos Aires	"Wapo Traketero"	—	✔	—	✔
Episode 6 (Sunday, 12 June)	2	Evelyn Romano	24	Mataderos, Buenos Aires	"I Don't Want to Miss a Thing"	—	—	—	—
Episode 6 (Sunday, 12 June)	3	Yhosva Montoya	23	Gaiman, Chubut	"Avanzar"	✔	✔	✔	✔
Episode 6 (Sunday, 12 June)	4	Leonardo Centeno	38	CABA, Buenos Aires	"Tears in Heaven"	—	—	—	—
Episode 6 (Sunday, 12 June)	5	Melibea Mauriz	18	Carapachay, Buenos Aires	"Royals"	✔	—	✔	✔
Episode 6 (Sunday, 12 June)	6	Candelaria Gervasoni	23	Santa Sylvina, Chaco	"Bajo el Cielo de Mantilla"	—	—	—	—
Episode 6 (Sunday, 12 June)	7	Andrés Cantos	26	Rivadavia, San Juan	"El Patio"	✔	✔	—	✔
Episode 6 (Sunday, 12 June)	8	Nadia Pulisich	29	Avellaneda, Buenos Aires	"El Baile del Ladrillo"	—	—	—	—
Episode 7 (Monday, 13 June)
Episode 7 (Monday, 13 June)	1	Emilia Soler	20	San Juan, San Juan	"At Last"	✔	✔	✔	✔
Episode 7 (Monday, 13 June)	2	Alexis Pey	22	Olavarría, Buenos Aires	"Deja de Llorar"	—	—	—	—
Episode 7 (Monday, 13 June)	3	Naiquén Galizio	32	Lincoln, Buenos Aires	"Yo, Dueña de la Noche"	✘	✔	—	—
Episode 7 (Monday, 13 June)	4	Nicolás Requena	—	Saavedra, Buenos Aires	"Modern Love"	—	—	—	—
Episode 7 (Monday, 13 June)	5	Julio García	22	Maturín, Venezuela	"Thinking Out Loud"	✔	✔	✔	—
Episode 7 (Monday, 13 June)	6	Luzía Cavallini	24	Pablo Nogués, Buenos Aires	"Pétalo de Sal"	✔	—	✔	—
Episode 7 (Monday, 13 June)	7	María Eugenia Meizoso	30	CABA, Buenos Aires	"Garota de Ipanema"	—	—	—	—
Episode 8 (Tuesday, 14 June)
Episode 8 (Tuesday, 14 June)	1	Sabrina Carbonel	18	Pte Derqui, Buenos Aires	"Episodios"	✔	✔	✔	—
Episode 8 (Tuesday, 14 June)	2	Carlos D'Annibalel	30	González Catán, Buenos Aires	"Chacarera Para Mi Vuelta"	—	—	—	—
Episode 8 (Tuesday, 14 June)	3	Adrián Ocampo	44	Flores, Buenos Aires	"I Was Born to Love You"	✔	✔	✔	✔
Episode 8 (Tuesday, 14 June)	4	Zoe Audisio	24	Río Cuarto, Córdoba	"Mary Poppins y el Deshollinador"	—	—	—	—
Episode 8 (Tuesday, 14 June)	5	Martín Taormina	23	Córdoba, Córdoba	"Blackbird"	—	—	—	—
Episode 8 (Tuesday, 14 June)	6	Nicolás Robul	21	Rosario, Santa Fe	"Wadu Wadu"	—	✔	—	✔
Episode 8 (Tuesday, 14 June)	7	Mariana Merlino	46	Lanús, Buenos Aires	"Qué Tango Hay Que Cantar"	—	—	—	—
Episode 9 (Wednesday, 15 June)
Episode 9 (Wednesday, 15 June)	1	Ayelén & Federico López	23-44	San Luis, San Luis	"Chiquitita"	—	✔	—	—
Episode 9 (Wednesday, 15 June)	2	Lucila Romero	27	Río Cuarto, Córdoba	"Amor Prohibido"	—	—	—	—
Episode 9 (Wednesday, 15 June)	3	Elías Pardal	26	San Lorenzo, Santa Fe	"Durazno Sangrando"	✔	✔	✔	—
Episode 9 (Wednesday, 15 June)	4	Zoe Tremsal	21	Moreno, Buenos Aires	"Girl"	—	—	—	—
Episode 9 (Wednesday, 15 June)	5	Hugo Ruíz Romero	41	Las Lajitas, Salta	"Tonada de un Viejo Amor"	—	—	—	✔
Episode 9 (Wednesday, 15 June)	6	Amandicia	25	Santa Fe, Santa Fe	"Stayin' Alive"	✔	✔	✔	✘
Episode 9 (Wednesday, 15 June)	7	Jesabel Peranzi	22	La Plata, Buenos Aires	"Black Hole Sun"	—	—	—	—
Episode 10 (Thursday, 16 June)
Episode 10 (Thursday, 16 June)	1	Trinidad Den Toom	18	Tigre, Buenos Aires	"Traitor"	—	—	—	—
Episode 10 (Thursday, 16 June)	2	Aneley Mattei	29	Quilmes, Buenos Aires	"Se Me ha Perdido un Corazón"	✔	✔	✔	✔
Episode 10 (Thursday, 16 June)	3	Nicolás Olivieri	22	Albardón, San Juan	"Pucha, Cómo es la Gente"	—	✔	—	—
Episode 10 (Thursday, 16 June)	4	Jano Ariagno	25	General Pico, La Pampa	"Guapa"	—	—	—	—
Episode 10 (Thursday, 16 June)	5	Leonardo Jurado	28	San Salvador de Jujuy, Jujuy	"Tarot"	✔	✔	—	—
Episode 10 (Thursday, 16 June)	6	Fabio Rivarola	19	Alcorta, Santa Fe	"Puerto Pollensa"	—	—	—	—
Episode 10 (Thursday, 16 June)	7	Micaela Sabra	27	CABA, Buenos Aires	"Landlord"	—	—	—	✔
Episode 11 (Sunday, 19 June)
Episode 11 (Sunday, 19 June)	1	Georgina Elevoff	27	Santa Rosa, Mendoza	"Te Necesito"	—	—	—	—
Episode 11 (Sunday, 19 June)	2	Juan Manuel Rubino	22	Tandil, Buenos Aires	"Canción de Amor"	✔	—	✔	—
Episode 11 (Sunday, 19 June)	3	Cintia Vallenari	31	Río Grande, Tierra del Fuego	"Prohibido Nuestro Amor"	—	—	—	—
Episode 11 (Sunday, 19 June)	4	Julián Gallo	19	Morteros, Córdoba	"La Boca"	✔	✔	✔	—
Episode 11 (Sunday, 19 June)	5	Julieta Silberberg	22	Montevideo, Uruguay	"Kiss Me"	✔	—	—	✔
Episode 11 (Sunday, 19 June)	6	Quique Montes	36	Torrevieja, España	"Me Falta el Aliento"	—	✔	—	—
Episode 11 (Sunday, 19 June)	7	Guido Taquini	29	Belgrano, Buenos Aires	"How Am I Supposed to Live Without You"	—	—	—	—
Episode 12 (Monday, 20 June)
Episode 12 (Monday, 20 June)	1	Ángela Navarro	22	Berazategui, Buenos Aires	"Cuando Nadie Me Ve"	✔	✔	✔	✔
Episode 12 (Monday, 20 June)	2	Franco Boffa	30	Rufino, Santa Fe	"Bailemos"	—	—	—	—
Episode 12 (Monday, 20 June)	3	Alejandro Cena	36	Colonias Unidas, Chaco	"Me Va a Extrañar"	✔	✔	✔	—
Episode 12 (Monday, 20 June)	4	Marco Díaz	31	Monte Grande, Buenos Aires	"Loco (Tu Forma de Ser)"	—	✔	—	—
Episode 12 (Monday, 20 June)	5	Antonella Podestá	18	Santa Fe, Santa Fe	"Con la Miel en los Labios"	—	—	—	—
Episode 12 (Monday, 20 June)	6	Juan Manuel González Mir	20	El Quebrachal, Salta	"Adiós"	—	✔	✔	—
Episode 12 (Monday, 20 June)	7	Juan Segundo Dorsi	25	Pico Truncado, Santa Cruz	"The House of the Rising Sun"	—	—	—	—
Episode 13 (Tuesday, 21 June)
Episode 13 (Tuesday, 21 June)	1	Jazmín Sparta	19	Quilmes, Buenos Aires	"El Adivino"	✘	✔	✔	✔
Episode 13 (Tuesday, 21 June)	2	Marilyn Targhetta	21	Río Cuarto, Córdoba	"Creo en Ti"	—	—	—	—
Episode 13 (Tuesday, 21 June)	3	Benjamín Assenato & Joaquín Sánchez	22-26	Salta, Salta	"Eterna en Mí"	—	—	—	—
Episode 13 (Tuesday, 21 June)	4	Michelle Alifano	27	Miami, United States	"Where Is the Love?"	✔	—	—	✔
Episode 13 (Tuesday, 21 June)	5	Santiago Quiroz	25	Moreno, Buenos Aires	"El Corralero"	—	✔	—	✔
Episode 13 (Tuesday, 21 June)	6	Wayra Iglesias	18	Parque Avellaneda, Buenos Aires	"Amor es Presente"	—	—	—	—
Episode 13 (Tuesday, 21 June)	7	Juan Pablo Cruceño	—	San Luis, San Luis	"Favorito"	—	—	—	—
Episode 14 (Wednesday, 22 June)
Episode 14 (Wednesday, 22 June)	1	Valentina & Emilia Crocitta	24-20	Lanús, Buenos Aires	"Así es el Calor"	✔	✔	—	—
Episode 14 (Wednesday, 22 June)	2	Andrea Guasch	24	Paraguay	"Confieso"	—	✔	✔	✔
Episode 14 (Wednesday, 22 June)	3	Gonzalo Cepeda	22	Pergamino, Buenos Aires	"No Llores por Mí Argentina"	—	—	—	—
Episode 14 (Wednesday, 22 June)	4	Sofía Brown	18	Austin, Texas	"A Sunday Kind of Love"	—	—	—	✔
Episode 14 (Wednesday, 22 June)	5	Joaquín Pérez Verona	19	Mar del Plata, Buenos Aires	"Set Fire to the Rain"	—	—	—	—
Episode 14 (Wednesday, 22 June)	6	Alfredo Oviedo	24	Margarita Island, Venezuela	"The Lazy Song"/"Three Little Birds"	✔	✔	✔	—
Episode 14 (Wednesday, 22 June)	7	Cristian Pertile	27	San Agustín, Córdoba	"Pateando Sapos"	—	—	—	—
Episode 15 (Thursday, 23 June)
Episode 15 (Thursday, 23 June)	1	Thomas Spagnol	18	Gualeguaychú, Entre Ríos	"Cabildo y Juramento"	✔	✔	✔	✔
Episode 15 (Thursday, 23 June)	2	Victoria Fernández	21	Lanús, Buenos Aires	"Heart of Glass"	—	—	—	—
Episode 15 (Thursday, 23 June)	3	Nuria Dutour	31	Villa Devoto, Buenos Aires	"Love Again"	✔	✘	—	✔
Episode 15 (Thursday, 23 June)	4	Gustavo Churruarín	45	Rosario, Santa Fe	"Se nos Rompió el Amor"	—	—	—	—
Episode 15 (Thursday, 23 June)	5	Micaela Sotera	25	Villa del Parque, Buenos Aires	"Por una Cabeza"	—	—	✔	—
Episode 15 (Thursday, 23 June)	6	Celeste Martino	31	CABA, Buenos Aires	"Sway"	—	✔	—	—
Episode 15 (Thursday, 23 June)	7	Agustín Reyna	24	Rosario, Santa Fe	"I Will Always Love You"	—	—	—	—
Episode 16 (Sunday, 26 June)
Episode 16 (Sunday, 26 June)	1	Mauricio Flores	19	Formosa, Formosa	"Lamento Mataco"	—	—	—	—
Episode 16 (Sunday, 26 June)	2	Lucía Gutiérrez Escribano	27	Rada Tilly, Chubut	"All I Want"	✔	✔	✔	✔
Episode 16 (Sunday, 26 June)	3	Victoria Cuello	24	Santa Fe, Santa Fe	"Plegarias"	✔	—	✔	—
Episode 16 (Sunday, 26 June)	4	Pablo Pasquali	36	Núñez, Buenos Aires	"Y Tú Te Vas"	—	—	—	—
Episode 16 (Sunday, 26 June)	5	Olivia Cuan	19	Tigre, Buenos Aires	"Just the Way You Are"	✔	—	✔	—
Episode 16 (Sunday, 26 June)	6	Emilia Oliveras	24	Córdoba, Córdoba	"Skyfall"	✔	✔	—	—
Episode 16 (Sunday, 26 June)	7	Juan Martín Biedma	29	San Isidro, Buenos Aires	"Live Is Life"	—	—	—	—
Episode 17 (Monday, 27 June)
Episode 17 (Monday, 27 June)	1	Morena Pereyra	22	Burzaco, Buenos Aires	"Don't Let Me Be Lonely Tonight"	✔	✔	✔	✘
Episode 17 (Monday, 27 June)	2	Kevin Castarlenas	29	Mendoza, Mendoza	"Con Cada Beso"	—	—	—	—
Episode 17 (Monday, 27 June)	3	Mauro Ojea	40	San Clemente, Buenos Aires	"Cachita"	—	—	—	—
Episode 17 (Monday, 27 June)	4	Ramiro Carballeda	22	Haedo, Buenos Aires	"Las Tardes del Sol, Las Noches del Agua"	—	—	—	✔
Episode 17 (Monday, 27 June)	5	Lilian Mollo	—	Valentín Alsina, Buenos Aires	"Arráncame la Vida"	✔	✔	—	—
Episode 17 (Monday, 27 June)	6	Macarena Tropea	27	Rosario, Santa Fe	"Tú"	—	—	—	—
Episode 18 (Tuesday, 28 June)
Episode 18 (Tuesday, 28 June)	1	Vanesa Magnago	29	Monte Maíz, Córdoba	"Ain't No Sunshine"	✔	✔	—	✔
Episode 18 (Tuesday, 28 June)	2	Jazmín Albarenga	25	Pilar, Buenos Aires	"Sin Vergüenza"	—	—	—	—
Episode 18 (Tuesday, 28 June)	3	Sofía Segovia	20	Caballito, Buenos Aires	"Todo se Transforma"	—	—	—	—
Episode 18 (Tuesday, 28 June)	4	Pablo García	34	Luján de Cuyo, Mendoza	"Sobrio"	✔	—	✔	—
Episode 18 (Tuesday, 28 June)	5	Fabricio Enrique	30	Entre Ríos	"Come Together"	—	—	—	—
Episode 18 (Tuesday, 28 June)	6	Francisco Escudero	25	San Rafael, Mendoza	"Soltar"	✔	✔	✔	✔
Episode 18 (Tuesday, 28 June)	7	Agustina Riavec	18	San Martín, Buenos Aires	"Fruta Amarga"	—	—	—	—
Episode 19 (Thursday, 30 June)
Episode 19 (Thursday, 30 June)	1	Maira Rossetto	30	Campo Quijano, Salta	"Si Me Ves Llorar por Ti"	—	—	—	—
Episode 19 (Thursday, 30 June)	2	Eliana Carletta	31	Parque Patricios, Buenos Aires	"Tainted Love"	✔	✔	—	—
Episode 19 (Thursday, 30 June)	3	Lisandro Machado	—	Charata, Chaco	"Puerto Tirol"	—	—	—	—
Episode 19 (Thursday, 30 June)	4	Bernardita Sonzini	24	Córdoba, Córdoba	"Dance Monkey"	—	✔	✔	✔
Episode 19 (Thursday, 30 June)	5	Uriel Ruíz	18	Guernica, Buenos Aires	"Que Me Alcance la Vida"	—	—	—	—
Episode 19 (Thursday, 30 June)	6	Esteban Muia	32	Olavarría, Buenos Aires	"Indio Toba"	—	✔	✔	✔
Episode 19 (Thursday, 30 June)	7	Martina Terzian	20	Villa Crespo, Buenos Aires	"Silencio"	—	—	—	—
Episode 19 (Thursday, 30 June)	8	Vanesa Henríquez	24	Caleta Olivia, Santa Cruz	"Soledad y el Mar"	—	—	—	✔
Episode 20 (Friday, 1 July)
Episode 20 (Friday, 1 July)	1	Brian Sáez	18	Tunuyán, Mendoza	"Te Esperaba"	✔	✔	—	—
Episode 20 (Friday, 1 July)	2	Jonatan Olivera	28	Garupá, Misiones	"Háblame de Ti"	—	—	—	—
Episode 20 (Friday, 1 July)	3	María del Rosario Escobar	50	Corrientes, Corrientes	"Alma Guaraní"	—	✔	—	—
Episode 20 (Friday, 1 July)	4	María Sol Moreno	18	San Martín, Mendoza	"Mi Buen Amor"	—	—	—	—
Episode 20 (Friday, 1 July)	5	Stefano Marocco	30	Rosario, Santa Fe	"My Heart Will Go On"	✔	✔	✔	—
Episode 20 (Friday, 1 July)	6	Mayra Castillo	23	Rosario, Santa Fe	"Talking to the Moon"	—	—	—	—
Episode 20 (Friday, 1 July)	7	Juan Manuel Godoy	30	San Miguel, Buenos Aires	"Ya Me Enteré"	✔	✔	—	✔
Episode 20 (Friday, 1 July)	8	Bryan Muñoz	22	Venezuela	"Make It Rain"	—	—	—	—
Episode 21 (Sunday, 3 July)
Episode 21 (Sunday, 3 July)	1	Elías Muñoz	23	San Juan, San Juan	"Coleccionista de Canciones"	✔	✔	—	—
Episode 21 (Sunday, 3 July)	2	Nahuel Lemes	25	Paysandú, Uruguay	"Será Que No Me Amas"	—	—	—	—
Episode 21 (Sunday, 3 July)	3	Nicolás Reartes	26	Córdoba, Córdoba	"Chacarera del Sufrido"	✔	✔	✘	✔
Episode 21 (Sunday, 3 July)	4	Mora Rivarola	19	Béccar, Buenos Aires	"A Cada Hombre, A Cada Mujer"	—	✔	—	✔
Episode 21 (Sunday, 3 July)	5	Candela Casella	21	Gral Pacheco, Buenos Aires	"Killing Me Softly with His Song"	—	—	—	—
Episode 21 (Sunday, 3 July)	6	Nicolás Bosetti	28	Villa del Rosario, Córdoba	"Un Mísil en Mi Placard"	—	—	✔	—
Episode 21 (Sunday, 3 July)	7	Ángeles Cociffi	23	Acassuso, Buenos Aires	"Cristina"	—	—	—	—
Episode 22 (Monday, 4 July)
Episode 22 (Monday, 4 July)	1	Belén del Greco	22	San Lorenzo, Santa Fe	"Crazy"	✘	—	✔	✔
Episode 22 (Monday, 4 July)	2	Alejandro Polero	51	San Miguel del Monte, Buenos Aires	"No Saber de Ti"	—	—	—	—
Episode 22 (Monday, 4 July)	3	Braian Orce	21	Alta Gracia, Córdoba	"Let It Go"	—	—	—	—
Episode 22 (Monday, 4 July)	4	Javier Sosa	40	Zárate, Buenos Aires	"Mediterráneo"	✔	✔	—	—
Episode 22 (Monday, 4 July)	5	Malena Serrano	21	Carmen de Areco, Buenos Aires	"Tú"	—	—	—	—
Episode 22 (Monday, 4 July)	6	Margarita Bullrich	18	CABA, Buenos Aires	"Aprender a Volar"	✔	✔	✔	✔
Episode 22 (Monday, 4 July)	7	Ramiro Frías	22	Tucumán, Tucumán	"Something"	—	—	—	—
Episode 23 (Tuesday, 5 July)
Episode 23 (Tuesday, 5 July)	1	Emmanuel Medina	23	Puerto Madryn, Chubut	"Saturno"	—	—	—	—
Episode 23 (Tuesday, 5 July)	2	Luis Aberastain	38	Guaymallén, Mendoza	"Carta a un Cuyano"	—	—	—	✔
Episode 23 (Tuesday, 5 July)	3	María Villamonte	31	Balvanera, Buenos Aires	"Como Mirarte"	—	—	—	—
Episode 23 (Tuesday, 5 July)	4	Victoria Méndez Bello	20	CABA, Buenos Aires	"Tu Nombre"	✔	—	—	—
Episode 23 (Tuesday, 5 July)	5	José Moncada Márquez	31	Venezuela	"Un Amor de la Calle"	—	—	—	—
Episode 23 (Tuesday, 5 July)	6	Soledad Gilabert	24	Rincón de Los Sauces, Neuquén	"Fue Culpa de los Dos"	—	✔	✔	—
Episode 23 (Tuesday, 5 July)	7	Gastón Recalde	20	Sgo del Estero, Sgo del Estero	"El Mar"	—	—	—	—
Episode 24 (Thursday, 7 July)
Episode 24 (Thursday, 7 July)	1	Emanuel Cerrudo	39	Isidro Casanova, Buenos Aires	"Y, ¿Si Fuera Ella?"	✔	—	✔	—
Episode 24 (Thursday, 7 July)	2	Víctor Volaño	—	Brinkmann, Córdoba	"Así Fue"	—	—	—	—
Episode 24 (Thursday, 7 July)	3	Marisol de Arriba	37	Vera, Santa Fe	"La Última Lágrima"	—	—	—	—
Episode 24 (Thursday, 7 July)	4	Juana Bestard Pino	19	CABA, Buenos Aires	"Una Luna de Miel en la Mano"	—	—	✔	—
Episode 24 (Thursday, 7 July)	5	Aldana Eve	25	Santa Fe, Santa Fe	"Del Otro Lado"	—	—	—	—
Episode 24 (Thursday, 7 July)	6	Huilén Currá	31	Villa Insuperable, Buenos Aires	"El Cantor de Buenos Aires"	✔	✔	✔	✔
Episode 24 (Thursday, 7 July)	7	Sergio Colazo	38	Rosario, Santa Fe	"Al Diablo"	—	—	—	—
Episode 25 (Sunday, 10 July)
Episode 25 (Sunday, 10 July)	1	Sofía Schiaffino	32	Ramos Mejía, Buenos Aires	"One and Only"	✔	✔	—	✘
Episode 25 (Sunday, 10 July)	2	Agustín Billordo	19	Empedrado, Corrientes	"Eres Tú"	—	—	—	—
Episode 25 (Sunday, 10 July)	3	Julieta Céliz	20	Caballito, Buenos Aires	"Buenos Aires"	✔	—	✔	—
Episode 25 (Sunday, 10 July)	4	Santiago Torres	28	Alta Gracia, Córdoba	"Cactus"	—	—	—	—
Episode 25 (Sunday, 10 July)	5	Javier Mandatori	39	Catamarca, Catamarca	"Paisajes de Catamarca"	—	✔	—	—
Episode 25 (Sunday, 10 July)	6	Ornela Taffarel	—	Gualeguaychú, Entre Ríos	"Canción del Jardinero"	—	—	—	—
Episode 25 (Sunday, 10 July)	7	Lola Taboada	28	Villa Gesell, Buenos Aires	"Amor Completo"	—	—	—	—
Episode 26 (Monday, 11 July)
Episode 26 (Monday, 11 July)	1	Mauricio Lastra	25	Tucumán, Tucumán	"Aire"	✔	—	—	—
Episode 26 (Monday, 11 July)	2	Manuela Bervejillo	22	Montevideo, Uruguay	"Put Your Records On"	—	—	—	—
Episode 26 (Monday, 11 July)	3	Florencia & Verónica Soaje	21	Alta Gracia, Córdoba	"El Niño y el Canario"	✔	✘	✔	—
Episode 26 (Monday, 11 July)	4	Tomás Barani	20	Córdoba, Córdoba	"Billie Jean"	✔	✔	✔	✔
Episode 26 (Monday, 11 July)	5	Ezequiel Romano	31	La Plata, Buenos Aires	"Zafar"	—	✔	—	—
Episode 26 (Monday, 11 July)	6	Azul Politi	19	Santa Fe, Santa Fe	"Ya Te Olvidé"	—	—	—	—
Episode 27 (Tuesday, 12 July)
Episode 27 (Tuesday, 12 July)	1	Luis Carrizo	28	San Carlos, Mendoza	"Fábulas de Amor"	—	—	—	—
Episode 27 (Tuesday, 12 July)	2	Elena Guarner	30	Cuba	"And I Am Telling You I'm Not Going"	✔	✔	✔	✔
Episode 27 (Tuesday, 12 July)	3	Javier Alexandre	38	Comodoro Rivadavia, Chubut	"Doña Ubenza"	—	—	—	—
Episode 27 (Tuesday, 12 July)	4	Morena López Díaz	20	Río Cuarto, Córdoba	"22"	—	—	✔	—
Episode 27 (Tuesday, 12 July)	5	Leandro Molle	36	La Plata, Buenos Aires	"Así No Te Amará Jamás"	—	—	—	—
Episode 27 (Tuesday, 12 July)	6	Carolina Diblasi	38	Caballito, Buenos Aires	"La Distancia"	✔	✔	—	—
Episode 27 (Tuesday, 12 July)	7	Sol Varak	36	Florida, Buenos Aires	"Los Libros de la Buena Memoria"	—	—	—	—
Episode 28 (Wednesday, 13 July)
Episode 28 (Wednesday, 13 July)	1	Sofía Maquieira	26	Tigre, Buenos Aires	"Make You Feel My Love"	✔	—	—	—
Episode 28 (Wednesday, 13 July)	2	Germán Olivares	28	Junín, Mendoza	"Pisando Nubes"	—	—	—	—
Episode 28 (Wednesday, 13 July)	3	Axel Riquelmes	20	Plottier, Nequén	"Te Escribo Desde el Sur"	—	✔	—	—
Episode 28 (Wednesday, 13 July)	4	Florencia Bonavida	26	Montevideo, Uruguay	"Cha Cha, Muchacha"	✔	✔	✔	✔
Episode 28 (Wednesday, 13 July)	5	Juana Chiesa	19	El Palomar, Buenos Aires	"Cuídame"	—	—	—	—
Episode 28 (Wednesday, 13 July)	6	Josefina Zaurdo	20	San Fernando, Buenos Aires	"Can't Take My Eyes Off You"	✔	—	✔	—
Episode 28 (Wednesday, 13 July)	7	Diego Silva	27	Punta Alta, Buenos Aires	"Estadio Azteca"	—	—	—	—
Episode 29 (Thursday, 14 July)
Episode 29 (Thursday, 14 July)	1	Camila Matarazzo	21	Villa Ballester, Buenos Aires	"Llorar"	—	✔	—	—
Episode 29 (Thursday, 14 July)	2	Iván Gette	28	Moreno, Buenos Aires	"Sólo le pido a Dios"	—	—	—	—
Episode 29 (Thursday, 14 July)	3	Julia Ferrón	39	Arrecifes, Buenos Aires	"La Cima del Cielo"	✔	—	—	—
Episode 29 (Thursday, 14 July)	4	Sofía Casanova	30	Córdoba, Buenos Aires	"Dame"	—	—	—	—
Episode 29 (Thursday, 14 July)	5	Gastón Bell	38	Cipolletti, Río Negro	"Love of My Life"	✔	✔	✔	✔
Episode 29 (Thursday, 14 July)	6	Iván Papetti	18	San Antonio de Padua, Buenos Aires	"Love Me Tender"	—	✘	—	✔
Episode 29 (Thursday, 14 July)	7	Carolina Obregón	21	Tigre, Buenos Aires	"Té para tres"	—	—	—	—
Episode 30 (Sunday, 17 July)
Episode 30 (Sunday, 17 July)	1	Gaia García Arbelo	21	Don Torcuato, Buenos Aires	"Me Gustas Mucho"	—	—	—	—
Episode 30 (Sunday, 17 July)	2	Ana & Milagros Oviedo	23-21	Mendoza, Mendoza	"Piel de Canela" / "Tutu"	✔	✔	—	—
Episode 30 (Sunday, 17 July)	3	Ezequiel Hernández	26	Uruguay	"Seré"	—	Team full	—	—
Episode 30 (Sunday, 17 July)	4	Johan Ruíz	28	Peru	"Suele Dejarme Solo"	—	Team full	✔	✔
Episode 30 (Sunday, 17 July)	5	Camila Díaz Paz	28	Tucumán, Tucumán	"Tu Falta de Querer"	—	Team full	Team full	—
Episode 30 (Sunday, 17 July)	6	Adrián Alexandre Tapia	21	Comodoro Rivadavia, Chubut	"Vienes y Te Vas"	✔	Team full	Team full	✔
Episode 30 (Sunday, 17 July)	7	Alejo Álvarez	20	Llavallol, Buenos Aires	"El Mismo Aire"	✔	Team full	Team full	Team full

== Battles ==
The battles began airing on 18 July 2022. The advisors for this round were Palito Ortega for Team Montaner, Karina for Team Soledad, Manuel Turizo for Team Mau & Rikcy, and Álex Ubago for Team Lali.

In this round, the coaches pit two of their artists in a singing match and then select one of them to advance to the next round. Losing artists may be "stolen" by another coach, becoming new members of their team.

Battles color key
Artist won the Battle and advanced to the Knockouts
Artist lost the Battle, but was stolen by another coach, and, advanced to the Knockouts
Artist lost the Battle and was eliminated
Artist lost the Battle but got a second chance to compete in "The Comeback Stage"

Battles results
Episode	Coach	Order	Winner	Song	Loser	'Steal' result			
Episode	Coach	Order	Winner	Song	Loser	Montaner	Soledad	Mau & Ricky	Lali
Episode 31 (Monday, 18 July)	Lali	1	Ángela Navarro	"Girl on Fire"	Sofía Brown	–	–	–	N/A
Episode 31 (Monday, 18 July)	Mau & Ricky	2	Francisco Escudero	"Best Part"	Luzía Cavallini	–	–	N/A	✔
Episode 31 (Monday, 18 July)	Montaner	3	Adrián Ocampo	"Esclavo de Sus Besos"	Alejandro Cena	N/A	–	–	–
Episode 31 (Monday, 18 July)	Soledad	4	Luciana Araya	"Nunca es Suficiente"	Ayelén & Federico López	–	N/A	–	–
Episode 32 (Tuesday, 19 July)	Mau & Ricky	1	Cecilia Mirabile	"Diamonds"	Melibea Mauriz	–	–	N/A	–
Episode 32 (Tuesday, 19 July)	Soledad	2	Nicolás Reartes	"La Simple"	Javier Mandatori	–	N/A	–	–
Episode 32 (Tuesday, 19 July)	Lali	3	Vanesa Magnago	"En la Ciudad de la Furia"	Mora Rivarola	–	–	–	N/A
Episode 32 (Tuesday, 19 July)	Montaner	4	Andrés Cantos	"No Se Tú"	Pablo Campos	N/A	–	–	–
Episode 33 (Wednesday, 20 July)	Lali	1	Hugo Ruíz Romero	"Canción para Carito"	Luis Aberastain	–	–	–	N/A
Episode 33 (Wednesday, 20 July)	Montaner	2	Julio García	"Shallow"	Soledad Cabrera	N/A	–	–	–
Episode 33 (Wednesday, 20 July)	Soledad	3	Marco Díaz	"19 días y 500 noches"	Quique Montes	–	N/A	–	–
Episode 33 (Wednesday, 20 July)	Mau & Ricky	4	Juana Bestard Pino	"Verte"	Johan Ruíz	–	–	N/A	–
Episode 34 (Thursday, 21 July)	Soledad	1	Damián Ayala	"Eterno Amor"	Esteban Muia	–	N/A	–	–
Episode 34 (Thursday, 21 July)	Mau & Ricky	2	Daiana Carrizo	"Hasta los Dientes"	Sabrina Carbonel	–	–	N/A	–
Episode 34 (Thursday, 21 July)	Montaner	3	Olivia Cuan	"Imaginame Sin Ti"	Nuria Dutour	N/A	–	–	–
Episode 34 (Thursday, 21 July)	Lali	4	Lucas Bongiovanni	"Beat It"	Ramiro Carballeda	–	–	–	N/A
Episode 35 (Sunday, 24 July)	Mau & Ricky	1	Ignacio Aguirre	"Somebody That I Used to Know"	Victoria Cuello	–	–	N/A	–
Episode 35 (Sunday, 24 July)	Soledad	2	Carolina Diblasi	"Quién Dijo"	Morena Pereyra	–	N/A	–	–
Episode 35 (Sunday, 24 July)	Lali	3	Florencia Bonavida	"Rehab"	Camila Pérez	–	–	–	N/A
Episode 35 (Sunday, 24 July)	Montaner	4	Dandara Guinaraes	"Telepatía"	Michelle Alifano	N/A	–	–	–
Episode 36 (Monday, 25 July)	Lali	1	Tomás Sagués	"Me Has Dejado"	Belén del Greco	✔	✔	✔	N/A
Episode 36 (Monday, 25 July)	Montaner	2	Julia Ferrón	"Sabor a Nada"	Lilian Mollo	N/A	–	–	–
Episode 36 (Monday, 25 July)	Soledad	3	Yhosva Montoya	"Amutuy"	Axel Riquelmes	–	N/A	–	–
Episode 36 (Monday, 25 July)	Mau & Ricky	4	Stefano Marocco	"What About Us"	Polina Piskova	–	–	N/A	–
Episode 37 (Tuesday, 26 July)	Soledad	1	Martín Ronconi	"Penumbras"	Javier Sosa	–	N/A	–	–
Episode 37 (Tuesday, 26 July)	Lali	2	Estef Figueroa	"Elvis Presley's Medley" (Note: Songs: "Suspicious Minds"/ "Don't Ask Me Why" / "Jailhouse Rock".)	Iván Papetti	–	✔	✔	N/A
Episode 37 (Tuesday, 26 July)	Montaner	3	Valentina & Emilia Crocitta	"Indigo"	Nicolás Pagnucco	N/A	Team full	–	–
Episode 37 (Tuesday, 26 July)	Mau & Ricky	4	Jazmín Sparta	"The Scientist"	Margarita Bullrich	–	Team full	N/A	–
Episode 38 (Wednesday, 27 July)	Montaner	1	Emanuel Cerrudo	"Mañana, Mañana"	Brian Sáez	N/A	Team full	–	–
Episode 38 (Wednesday, 27 July)	Lali	2	Emilia Soler	"The Shoop Shoop Song"	Salustiano Zavalía	–	Team full	–	N/A
Episode 38 (Wednesday, 27 July)	Soledad	3	Huilén Currá	"La Pulpera de Santa Lucía"	Celeste Martino	–	Team full	–	–
Episode 38 (Wednesday, 27 July)	Mau & Ricky	4	Morena López Díaz	"Una y Mil Veces"	Julián Gallo	–	Team full	N/A	–
Episode 39 (Thursday, 28 July)	Soledad	1	Nicolás Olivieri	"Mujer, Niña y Amiga"	Octavio Muratore	–	Team full	✔	–
Episode 39 (Thursday, 28 July)	Montaner	2	Eliana Carletta	"Sure Know Something"	Franco Casañas	N/A	Team full	–	–
Episode 39 (Thursday, 28 July)	Lali	3	Juan Manuel Godoy	"Si No Te Hubieras Ido"	Adrián Alexandre Tapia	–	Team full	–	N/A
Episode 39 (Thursday, 28 July)	Mau & Ricky	4	Renato Barbieri	"Easy"	Nicolás Bosetti	–	Team full	N/A	–
Episode 40 (Sunday, 31 July)	Lali	1	Yanela Toscano	"Mafiosa"	Vanesa Henríquez	–	Team full	–	N/A
Episode 40 (Sunday, 31 July)	Soledad	2	Andrea Guasch	"All of Me"	Emilia Oliveras	–	Team full	–	–
Episode 40 (Sunday, 31 July)	Montaner	3	Alejo Álvarez	"Vaina Loca"	Juan Manuel Rubino	N/A	Team full	–	–
Episode 40 (Sunday, 31 July)	Mau & Ricky	4	Micaela Sotera	"Time After Time"	Bernardita Sonzini	–	Team full	N/A	–
Episode 41 (Monday, 1 August)	Mau & Ricky	1	Julieta Céliz	"A Natural Woman"	Amandicia	✔	Team full	N/A	–
Episode 41 (Monday, 1 August)	Soledad	2	Santiago Quiroz	"La Magia de Tus Ojos"	Soledad Gilabert	–	Team full	–	–
Episode 41 (Monday, 1 August)	Lali	3	Julieta Silberberg	"Baby Can I Hold You"	Micaela Sabra	–	Team full	–	N/A
Episode 41 (Monday, 1 August)	Montaner	4	Leonardo Jurado	"Tu Enemigo"	Pablo García	N/A	Team full	–	–
Episode 42 (Tuesday, 2 August)	Mau & Ricky	1	Florencia & Verónica Soaje	"Salvapantallas"	Josefina Zaurdo	–	Team full	N/A	✔
Episode 42 (Tuesday, 2 August)	Lali	2	Thomas Spagnol	"Me Siento Mucho Mejor"	Nicolás Robul	–	Team full	–	Team full
Episode 42 (Tuesday, 2 August)	Montaner	3	Elías Pardal	"Volver a Empezar"	Victoria Méndez Bello	N/A	Team full	–	Team full
Episode 42 (Tuesday, 2 August)	Soledad	4	Naiquén Galizio	"Apuesta por el Amor"	María del Rosario Escobar	–	Team full	–	Team full
Episode 43 (Wednesday, 3 August)	Montaner	1	Mauricio Lastra	"Resumiendo"	Elías Muñoz	N/A	Team full	–	Team full
Episode 43 (Wednesday, 3 August)	Soledad	2	Ignacio Pereira	"Un Montón de Estrellas"	Ezequiel Romano	–	Team full	✔	Team full
Episode 43 (Wednesday, 3 August)	Lali	3	Lucía Gutiérrez Escribano	"Love on the Brain"	Elena Guarner	–	Team full	Team full	Team full
Episode 43 (Wednesday, 3 August)	Mau & Ricky	4	Juan Manuel González Mir	"Déjà vu"	Gastón Bell	–	Team full	Team full	Team full
Episode 44 (Thursday, 4 August)	Lali	1	Florencia Ronconi	"Sweet Child o' Mine"	Tomás Barani	–	Team full	Team full	Team full
Episode 44 (Thursday, 4 August)	Montaner	2	Sofía Maquieira	"Corazón Prohibido"	Sofía Schiaffino	N/A	Team full	Team full	Team full
Episode 44 (Thursday, 4 August)	Mau & Ricky	3	Alfredo Oviedo	"La Fama"	Aneley Mattei	✔	Team full	Team full	Team full
Episode 44 (Thursday, 4 August)	Soledad	4	Camila Matarazzo	"Ex de Verdad"	Ana & Milagros Oviedo	Team full	Team full	Team full	Team full

== Knockouts ==
The Knockouts will be airing on 7 August 2022. The mentors for this season's knockouts will be Alejandro Lerner for Team Montaner, Diego Torres for Team Soledad, FMK for Team Mau & Ricky, and Mateo Sujatovich for Team Lali.

In this round, each coach pairs two of their artists in a singing match. The artists themselves will select the song they will sing in the round. The coach will then select one of the artists to advance to the Live Playoffs. Each coach can steal two losing artist from another team during the Knockouts.

Knockouts color key
Artist won the Knockout and advanced to the Live Playoffs
Artist lost the Knockout but, was stolen by another coach, and advanced to the Live Playoffs
Artist lost the Knockout and was eliminated
Artist lost the Knockout and was eliminated, but got a second chance to compete in "The Comeback Stage"

Knockouts results
Episode	Coach	Order	Ganador/a		Perdedor/a		'Steal' result			
Episode	Coach	Order	Canción	Artista	Artista	Canción	Montaner	Soledad	Mau & Ricky	Lali
Episode 45 (Sunday, 7 August)	Montaner	1	"Ciudad de pobres corazones"	Elías Pardal	Adrián Ocampo	"Invéntame"	N/A	–	–	–
Episode 45 (Sunday, 7 August)	Lali	2	"Elastic Heart"	Emilia Soler	Josefina Zaurdo	"Disparo al Corazón"	–	–	–	N/A
Episode 45 (Sunday, 7 August)	Mau & Ricky	3	"Mía"	Octavio Muratore	Ezequiel Romano	"Zamba y acuarela"	–	–	N/A	–
Episode 46 (Monday, 8 August)	Soledad	1	"Corazón Hambriento"	Luciana Araya	Camila Matarazzo	"Vas a Quedarte"	–	N/A	–	–
Episode 46 (Monday, 8 August)	Mau & Ricky	2	"Kiss from a Rose"	Francisco Escudero	Renato Barbieri	"Wicked Game"	✔	✔	N/A	✔
Episode 46 (Monday, 8 August)	Montaner	3	"Right to Be Wrong"	Sofía Maquieira	Amandicia	"Con Los Años Que Me Quedan"	N/A	–	–	–
Episode 46 (Monday, 8 August)	Lali	4	"Todo Mi Amor"	Juan Manuel Godoy	Hugo Ruíz Romero	"El Secreto de Tu Vida"	–	–	–	N/A
Episode 47 (Tuesday, 9 August)	Lali	1	"Happier"	Luzía Cavallini	Julieta Silberberg	"Querida Rosa"	✔	–	–	N/A
Episode 47 (Tuesday, 9 August)	Montaner	2	"Separate Lives"	Julio García	Valentina & Emilia Crocitta	"Mi Persona Favorita"	N/A	–	–	–
Episode 47 (Tuesday, 9 August)	Soledad	3	"La Gata Bajo la Lluvia"	Huilén Currá	Naiquén Galizio	"Simplemente Amigos"	–	N/A	–	–
Episode 48 (Wednesday, 10 August)	Montaner	1	"La Quiero a Morir"	Emanuel Cerrudo	Mauricio Lastra	"Sólo Importas Tú"	N/A	–	–	–
Episode 48 (Wednesday, 10 August)	Soledad	2	"Intento"	Ignacio Pereira	Carolina Diblasi	"Te Doy Una Canción"	–	N/A	–	–
Episode 48 (Wednesday, 10 August)	Mau & Ricky	3	"Hecha Pa' Mi"	Cecilia Mirabile	Julieta Céliz	"Cry Me a River"	✔	–	N/A	–
Episode 49 (Thursday, 11 August)	Mau & Ricky	1	"Hurt"	Jazmín Sparta	Juan Manuel González Mir	"Óleo de una Mujer Con Sombrero"	Team full	✔	N/A	–
Episode 49 (Thursday, 11 August)	Soledad	2	"El Arriero"	Martín Ronconi	Marco Díaz	"Sola"	Team full	N/A	–	–
Episode 49 (Thursday, 11 August)	Lali	3	"Listen to Your Heart"	Vanesa Magnago	Lucía Gutiérrez Escribano	"Que Lloro"	Team full	–	–	N/A
Episode 50 (Sunday, 14 August)	Lali	1	"Mi Soledad y Yo"	Thomas Spagnol	Lucas Bongiovanni	"Entre Dos Tierras"	Team full	–	–	N/A
Episode 50 (Sunday, 14 August)	Montaner	2	"Amigos Con Derechos"	Alejo Álvarez	Aneley Mattei	"A Un Milímetro de Ti"	Team full	–	–	–
Episode 50 (Sunday, 14 August)	Mau & Ricky	3	"Stay"	Morena López Díaz	Daiana Carrizo	"Lay Me Down"	Team full	–	N/A	–
Episode 51 (Monday, 15 August)	Montaner	1	"Lucía"	Leonardo Jurado	Andrés Cantos	"Ahora Quién"	Team full	✔	✔	✔
Episode 51 (Monday, 15 August)	Soledad	2	"Vuelve"	Santiago Quiroz	Andrea Guasch	"En Cambio No"	Team full	–	N/A	Team full
Episode 51 (Monday, 15 August)	Lali	3	"Beautiful Girls"	Tomás Sagués	Yanela Toscano	"High (Remix)"	Team full	–	–	Team full
Episode 52 (Tuesday, 16 August)	Soledad	1	"Mi Estrella Predilecta"	Yhosva Montoya	Nicolás Olivieri	"Aire de Nostalgia"	Team full	N/A	–	Team full
Episode 52 (Tuesday, 16 August)	Lali	2	"All About That Bass"	Florencia Bonavida	Estef Figueroa	"Oh, Pretty Woman"	Team full	–	–	Team full
Episode 52 (Tuesday, 16 August)	Mau & Ricky	3	"Tú Me Dejaste De Querer"	Micaela Sotera	Florencia & Verónica Soaje	"Amapola"	Team full	–	N/A	Team full
Episode 52 (Tuesday, 16 August)	Montaner	4	"Stone Cold"	Dandara Guinaraes	Olivia Cuan	"How Deep Is Your Love"	Team full	–	✔	Team full
Episode 53 (Wednesday, 17 August)	Soledad	1	"El Cielo del Albañil"	Damián Ayala	Nicolás Reartes	"La Pomeña"	Team full	N/A	–	Team full
Episode 53 (Wednesday, 17 August)	Montaner	2	"Amores Extraños"	Julia Ferrón	Eliana Carletta	"Inevitable"	Team full	–	–	Team full
Episode 53 (Wednesday, 17 August)	Mau & Ricky	3	"Take Me to Church"	Juana Bestard Pino	Ignacio Aguirre	"Alma Dinamita"	Team full	–	N/A	Team full
Episode 54 (Thursday, 18 August)	Soledad	1	"Over the Rainbow"	Belén del Greco	Iván Papetti	"The Way You Look Tonight"	Team full	N/A	✔	Team full
Episode 54 (Thursday, 18 August)	Mau & Ricky	2	"Llorar y Llorar"	Stefano Marocco	Alfredo Oviedo	"Te Soñé"	Team full	✔	Team full	Team full
Episode 54 (Thursday, 18 August)	Lali	3	"You and I"	Ángela Navarro	Florencia Ronconi	"Fue Amor"	Team full	Team full	Team full	Team full

== Playoffs ==
During each of the four Playoff nights, the ten artists from each team will perform. At the end of each round, each coach will choose four artists to advance and the other four will be saved by the public. The top 32 artists advanced to the next round.

Playoffs color key
Artist was saved by the public's vote
Artist was saved by his/her coach
Artist was eliminated

Playoffs results
Episode	Coach	Order	Artist	Song	Result
Episode 55 (Sunday, 21 August)	Montaner	1	Elías Pardal	"Mi Historia Entre Tus Dedos"	Public's vote
Episode 55 (Sunday, 21 August)	Montaner	2	Julio García	"¿Quién Te Dijo Eso?"	Eliminated
Episode 55 (Sunday, 21 August)	Montaner	3	Julieta Silberberg	"I'd Rather Go Blind"	Eliminated
Episode 55 (Sunday, 21 August)	Montaner	4	Dandara Guinaraes	"¡Corre!"	Public's vote
Episode 55 (Sunday, 21 August)	Montaner	5	Emanuel Cerrudo	"No Tengo Nada"	Public's vote
Episode 55 (Sunday, 21 August)	Montaner	6	Julia Ferrón	"Sin Ti"	Ricardo's choice
Episode 55 (Sunday, 21 August)	Montaner	7	Alejo Álvarez	"Se Acaba"	Ricardo's choice
Episode 55 (Sunday, 21 August)	Montaner	8	Julieta Céliz	"Vivir Sin Aire"	Ricardo's choice
Episode 55 (Sunday, 21 August)	Montaner	9	Leonardo Jurado	"Aprendiz"	Ricardo's choice
Episode 55 (Sunday, 21 August)	Montaner	10	Sofía Maquieira	"Ya No Hay Forma de Pedir Perdón"	Public's vote
Episode 56 (Monday, 22 August)	Lali	1	Juan Manuel Godoy	"Nunca Voy a Olvidarte"	Public's vote
Episode 56 (Monday, 22 August)	Lali	2	Emilia Soler	"Good Woman"	Lali's choice
Episode 56 (Monday, 22 August)	Lali	3	Thomas Spagnol	"Crimen"	Eliminated
Episode 56 (Monday, 22 August)	Lali	4	Ángela Navarro	"Me Quedo Contigo"	Lali's choice
Episode 56 (Monday, 22 August)	Lali	5	Renato Barbieri	"Sugar"	Public's vote
Episode 56 (Monday, 22 August)	Lali	6	Tomás Sagués	"Shape of My Heart"	Lali's choice
Episode 56 (Monday, 22 August)	Lali	7	Andrés Cantos	"Mucho Más Allá"	Public's vote
Episode 56 (Monday, 22 August)	Lali	8	Luzía Cavallini	"It's a Man's Man's Man's World"	Lali's choice
Episode 56 (Monday, 22 August)	Lali	9	Florencia Bonavida	"...Baby One More Time"	Public's vote
Episode 56 (Monday, 22 August)	Lali	10	Vanesa Magnago	"Yo Vengo a Ofrecer Mi Corazón"	Eliminated
Episode 57 (Tuesday, 23 August)	Soledad	1	Luciana Araya	"Mi Tierra"	Soledad's choice
Episode 57 (Tuesday, 23 August)	Soledad	2	Juan Manuel González Mir	"Seguir Viviendo Sin Tu Amor"	Eliminated
Episode 57 (Tuesday, 23 August)	Soledad	3	Ignacio Pereira	"Fuego y Pasión"	Soledad's choice
Episode 57 (Tuesday, 23 August)	Soledad	4	Belén del Greco	"Cuando Ya Me Empiece a Quedar Solo"	Public's vote
Episode 57 (Tuesday, 23 August)	Soledad	5	Damián Ayala	"La Mitad"	Public's vote
Episode 57 (Tuesday, 23 August)	Soledad	6	Martín Ronconi	"Hoy Tengo Ganas de Ti"	Public's vote
Episode 57 (Tuesday, 23 August)	Soledad	7	Yhosva Montoya	"Pájaro Cantor"	Soledad's choice
Episode 57 (Tuesday, 23 August)	Soledad	8	Huilén Currá	"Afiches"	Soledad's choice
Episode 57 (Tuesday, 23 August)	Soledad	9	Alfredo Oviedo	"Un Beso y Una Flor"	Public's vote
Episode 57 (Tuesday, 23 August)	Soledad	10	Santiago Quiroz	"Devuélveme El Corazón"	Eliminated
Episode 58 (Wednesday, 24 August)	Mau & Ricky	1	Stefano Marocco	"Víveme"	Public's vote
Episode 58 (Wednesday, 24 August)	Mau & Ricky	2	Cecilia Mirabile	"Bichota"	Mau & Ricky's choice
Episode 58 (Wednesday, 24 August)	Mau & Ricky	3	Iván Papetti	"Never Gonna Give You Up"	Public's vote
Episode 58 (Wednesday, 24 August)	Mau & Ricky	4	Octavio Muratore	"Me Voy Quedando"	Mau & Ricky's choice
Episode 58 (Wednesday, 24 August)	Mau & Ricky	5	Morena López Díaz	"Don't Dream It's Over"	Public's vote
Episode 58 (Wednesday, 24 August)	Mau & Ricky	6	Olivia Cuan	"Bésame"	Eliminated
Episode 58 (Wednesday, 24 August)	Mau & Ricky	7	Micaela Sotera	"I Say a Little Prayer"	Eliminated
Episode 58 (Wednesday, 24 August)	Mau & Ricky	8	Francisco Escudero	"La Tortura"	Mau & Ricky's choice
Episode 58 (Wednesday, 24 August)	Mau & Ricky	9	Juana Bestard Pino	"The Only Exception"	Mau & Ricky's choice
Episode 58 (Wednesday, 24 August)	Mau & Ricky	10	Jazmín Sparta	"God Is a Woman"	Public's vote

== The Comeback Stage ==
For this season, the show again added a phase of competition called The Comeback Stage, exclusive to MiTelefe mobile app, La Voz Argentina YouTube channel, Instagram TV, Facebook, Twitter, and Telefe.com. Fifth coach MYA selected artists who did not turn a chair during the Blind auditions as well as eliminated artists from later rounds of the competition.

Comeback Stage color key
Artist was chosen to advance to the next round
Artist was initially chosen to advance, but did not
Artist was eliminated
Artist received majority of the public's votes and wins The Comeback

=== First round ===
During the first round of competition, the twelve selected artists went head to head, two artists per episode, and MYA selected a winner to move on to the next round.

Episode (Digital)	Coach	Song	Artists		Song
Episode 1 (Sunday, 19 June)	MYA	"Lo Que Construimos"	Isabella Bistmans	Elías Perea	"Manos de Tijera"
Episode 2 (Sunday, 26 June)	MYA	"Burbujas de Amor"	María Eugenia Meizoso	Martín Taormina	"Chega de Saudade"
Episode 3 (Sunday, 3 July)	MYA	"Como Yo Nadie Te Ha Amado"	Victoria Fernández	Gonzalo Cepeda	"When We Were Young"
Episode 4 (Sunday, 10 July)	MYA	"Señor Amante"	Maira Rossetto	Jonatan Olivera	"Te Vi Venir"
Episode 5 (Sunday, 18 July)	MYA	"Toda Una Vida"	José Moncada Márquez	Ornela Taffarel	"Zamba de Usted"
Episode 6 (Sunday, 24 July)	MYA	"Balderrama"	Iván Gette	Ezequiel Hernández	"El Día Que Me Quieras"

=== Second round ===
In the second round, MYA brought back three artists who were eliminated during the main competition Battles, giving them a chance to re-enter in the competition. These artists faced off against the six artists from the first round.

Episode (Digital)	Coach	Winner		Losers	
Episode (Digital)	Coach	Song	Artist	Artists	Songs
Episode 7 (Sunday, 31 July)	MYA	"Creo en Mi"	María Eugenia Meizoso	Salustiano Zavalía	"Vete"
Episode 7 (Sunday, 31 July)	MYA	"Creo en Mi"	María Eugenia Meizoso	Maira Rossetto	"Uno"
Episode 8 (Sunday, 7 August)	MYA	"City of Stars"	Isabella Bistmans	Iván Gette	"Hasta Que Me Olvides"
Episode 8 (Sunday, 7 August)	MYA	"City of Stars"	Isabella Bistmans	Juan Manuel Rubino	"Entre tu amor y mi amor"
Episode 9 (Sunday, 14 August)	MYA	"Born This Way"	Polina Piskova	Victoria Fernández	"Hello"
Episode 9 (Sunday, 14 August)	MYA	"Born This Way"	Polina Piskova	José Moncada Márquez	"Amarte Es un Placer"

=== Third round ===
In the third round, the three remaining artists and three artists who were eliminated during the main competition Knockouts performed in front of MYA and four were selected to perform in a fourth round.

Episode (Digital)	Coach	Order	Artist	Song
Episode 10 (Thursday, 18 August)	MYA	1	Isabella Bistmans	"Barro Tal Vez"
Episode 10 (Thursday, 18 August)	MYA	2	María Eugenia Meizoso	"Sabor a Mí"
Episode 10 (Thursday, 18 August)	MYA	3	Polina Piskova	"Por Siempre Tu"
Episode 10 (Thursday, 18 August)	MYA	4	Naiquén Galizio	"Quién Como Tú"
Episode 10 (Thursday, 18 August)	MYA	5	Marco Díaz	"Depende"
Episode 10 (Thursday, 18 August)	MYA	6	Mauricio Lastra	"Amarte Así"

=== Fourth round ===
In the fourth round, the four remaining artists performed in front of MYA and three were selected to perform in a fifth and final round. However, at the end of the competition the four artists were chosen to return.

Episode (Digital)	Coach	Order	Artist	Song
Episode 11 (Sunday, 21 August)	MYA	1	Polina Piskova	"Héroe"
Episode 11 (Sunday, 21 August)	MYA	2	Isabella Bistmans	"Trátame Suavemente"
Episode 11 (Sunday, 21 August)	MYA	3	Marco Díaz	"Cómo Le Digo"
Episode 11 (Sunday, 21 August)	MYA	4	Naiquén Galizio	"Me Va a Extrañar"

=== Final round (Lives' Round of 33) ===
The contestants performed in the first night of the round of 33 for the main competition, with the winner officially joining one of the four main teams. Naiquén Galizio was chosen as the winner by the public's vote and she decided to join Ricardo Montaner's team.

Episode	Coach	Order	Artist	Song
Episode 56 (Thursday, 25 August)	MYA	1	Naiquén Galizio	"Fuera de Mi Vida"
Episode 56 (Thursday, 25 August)	MYA	2	Polina Piskova	"La Curiosidad"
Episode 56 (Thursday, 25 August)	MYA	3	Marco Díaz	"Me Estás Atrapando Otra Vez"
Episode 56 (Thursday, 25 August)	MYA	4	Isabella Bistmans	"Procuro Olvidarte"

== Live shows ==
Live shows color key
Artist was saved by the public's vote
Artist was eliminated

=== Round of 33 ===
Round of 33 results
Episode	Coach	Order	Artist	Song	Result
Episode 59 (Thursday, 25 August)	Soledad	1	Luciana Araya	"Juana Azurduy"	Public's vote
Episode 59 (Thursday, 25 August)	Soledad	2	Martín Ronconi	"Unchain My Heart"	Public's vote
Episode 59 (Thursday, 25 August)	Soledad	3	Ignacio Pereira	"Usted No Sabe"	Public's vote
Episode 59 (Thursday, 25 August)	Soledad	4	Yhosva Montoya	"Para Decir Adiós"	Public's vote
Episode 59 (Thursday, 25 August)	Soledad	5	Alfredo Oviedo	"Waitin'"	Eliminated
Episode 59 (Thursday, 25 August)	Soledad	6	Huilén Currá	"Nostalgias"	Public's vote
Episode 59 (Thursday, 25 August)	Soledad	7	Belén del Greco	"I Wanna Dance with Somebody"	Eliminated
Episode 59 (Thursday, 25 August)	Soledad	8	Damián Ayala	"Estudiante del Interior"	Public's vote
Episode 60 (Sunday, 28 August)	Lali	1	Florencia Bonavida	"Hablando a Tu Corazón"	Eliminated
Episode 60 (Sunday, 28 August)	Lali	2	Juan Manuel Godoy	"Sueña"	Public's vote
Episode 60 (Sunday, 28 August)	Lali	3	Ángela Navarro	"Unstoppable"	Public's vote
Episode 60 (Sunday, 28 August)	Lali	4	Andrés Cantos	"La Estrella Azul"	Public's vote
Episode 60 (Sunday, 28 August)	Lali	5	Tomás Sagués	"Fresco"	Public's vote
Episode 60 (Sunday, 28 August)	Lali	6	Luzía Cavallini	"Vete de Mi"	Eliminated
Episode 60 (Sunday, 28 August)	Lali	7	Emilia Soler	"Survivor"	Public's vote
Episode 60 (Sunday, 28 August)	Lali	8	Renato Barbieri	"El 38"	Public's vote
Episode 61 (Monday, 29 August)	Montaner	1	Julia Ferrón	"One Moment in Time"	Public's vote
Episode 61 (Monday, 29 August)	Montaner	2	Alejo Álvarez	"Porque Aún Te Amo"	Public's vote
Episode 61 (Monday, 29 August)	Montaner	3	Dandara Guinaraes	"Burbujas de Amor"	Public's vote
Episode 61 (Monday, 29 August)	Montaner	4	Elías Pardal	"Los Mareados"	Public's vote
Episode 61 (Monday, 29 August)	Montaner	5	Sofía Maquieira	"You Know I'm No Good"	Eliminated
Episode 61 (Monday, 29 August)	Montaner	6	Naiquén Galizio	"A Mi Manera"	Public's vote
Episode 61 (Monday, 29 August)	Montaner	7	Leonardo Jurado	"Nada Personal"	Public's vote
Episode 61 (Monday, 29 August)	Montaner	8	Julieta Céliz	"Contigo en la Distancia"	Eliminated
Episode 61 (Monday, 29 August)	Montaner	9	Emanuel Cerrudo	"Como Yo Te Amé"	Public's vote
Episode 62 (Tuesday, 30 August)	Mau & Ricky	1	Iván Papetti	"It's Not Unusual"	Public's vote
Episode 62 (Tuesday, 30 August)	Mau & Ricky	2	Morena López Díaz	"Te Felicito"	Eliminated
Episode 62 (Tuesday, 30 August)	Mau & Ricky	3	Stefano Marocco	"Blinding Lights"	Eliminated
Episode 62 (Tuesday, 30 August)	Mau & Ricky	4	Octavio Muratore	"Allá Donde Fui Feliz"	Public's vote
Episode 62 (Tuesday, 30 August)	Mau & Ricky	5	Cecilia Mirabile	"I Kissed a Girl"	Public's vote
Episode 62 (Tuesday, 30 August)	Mau & Ricky	6	Juana Bestard Pino	"Dakiti"	Public's vote
Episode 62 (Tuesday, 30 August)	Mau & Ricky	7	Francisco Escudero	"Thriller"	Public's vote
Episode 62 (Tuesday, 30 August)	Mau & Ricky	8	Jazmín Sparta	"Si Tú No Estás"	Public's vote

Non-competition performances
Order	Performers	Song
59.1	Soledad and MYA	"Yo No Te Pido La Luna"

=== Round of 25 ===
Round of 25 results
Episode	Coach	Order	Artist	Song	Result
Episode 63 (Wednesday, 31 August)	Soledad	1	Yhosva Montoya	"La Maza"	Public's vote
Episode 63 (Wednesday, 31 August)	Soledad	2	Martín Ronconi	"Rock and Roll"	Public's vote
Episode 63 (Wednesday, 31 August)	Soledad	3	Luciana Araya	"Lágrimas y Flores"	Eliminated
Episode 63 (Wednesday, 31 August)	Soledad	4	Damián Ayala	"Frío Frío"	Public's vote
Episode 63 (Wednesday, 31 August)	Soledad	5	Huilén Currá	"¿A Quién Le Importa?"	Public's vote
Episode 63 (Wednesday, 31 August)	Soledad	6	Ignacio Pereira	"Señora de las Cuatro Décadas"	Eliminated
Episode 64 (Thursday, 1 September)	Lali	1	Tomás Sagués	"Heartbreak Anniversary"	Public's vote
Episode 64 (Thursday, 1 September)	Lali	2	Ángela Navarro	"Seminare"	Public's vote
Episode 64 (Thursday, 1 September)	Lali	3	Renato Barbieri	"Rebel Yell"	Eliminated
Episode 64 (Thursday, 1 September)	Lali	4	Emilia Soler	"Por Quien Merece Amor"	Public's vote
Episode 64 (Thursday, 1 September)	Lali	5	Andrés Cantos	"Corazón Partío"	Eliminated
Episode 64 (Thursday, 1 September)	Lali	6	Juan Manuel Godoy	"Mientes Tan Bien"	Public's vote
Episode 65 (Sunday, 4 September)	Montaner	1	Alejo Álvarez	"Dejaría Todo"	Eliminated
Episode 65 (Sunday, 4 September)	Montaner	2	Emanuel Cerrudo	"Cielito Lindo"	Public's vote
Episode 65 (Sunday, 4 September)	Montaner	3	Dandara Guinaraes	"No One"	Eliminated
Episode 65 (Sunday, 4 September)	Montaner	4	Elías Pardal	"Ángel"	Public's vote
Episode 65 (Sunday, 4 September)	Montaner	5	Julia Ferrón	"Pero Me Acuerdo de Ti"	Public's vote
Episode 65 (Sunday, 4 September)	Montaner	6	Leonardo Jurado	"Dónde está el Amor"	Eliminated
Episode 65 (Sunday, 4 September)	Montaner	7	Naiquén Galizio	"Alfonsina y el Mar"	Public's vote
Episode 66 (Monday, 5 September)	Mau & Ricky	1	Cecilia Mirabile	"Despechá"	Public's vote
Episode 66 (Monday, 5 September)	Mau & Ricky	2	Octavio Muratore	"Un Hombre Normal"	Public's vote
Episode 66 (Monday, 5 September)	Mau & Ricky	3	Iván Papetti	"Mambo No. 5"	Public's vote
Episode 66 (Monday, 5 September)	Mau & Ricky	4	Juana Bestard Pino	"Running Up That Hill"	Eliminated
Episode 66 (Monday, 5 September)	Mau & Ricky	5	Jazmín Sparta	"Parte de Mí"	Eliminated
Episode 66 (Monday, 5 September)	Mau & Ricky	6	Francisco Escudero	"Tu Recuerdo"	Public's vote

Non-competition performances
Order	Performers	Song
63.1	Soledad and her team (Yhosva, Martín, Luciana, Damián, Huilén and Ignacio)	"Vivir Es Hoy"
64.1	Lali and her team (Tomás, Emilia, Juan Manuel, Ángela, Andrés and Renato)	"Como tú"
65.1	Ricardo Montaner and his team (Dandara, Elías, Alejo, Leonardo, Naiquén, Emanuel and Julia)	"Quisiera"
66.1	Mau & Ricky and their team (Cecilia, Octavio, Iván, Juana, Jazmín and Francisco)	"Desconocidos"

=== Quarterfinals ===
Quarterfinals results
Episode	Coach	Order	Artist	Song	Result
Episode 67 (Tuesday, 6 September)	Lali	1	Emilia Soler	"Par mil"	Eliminated
Episode 67 (Tuesday, 6 September)	Lali	2	Ángela Navarro	"The Show Must Go On"	Public's vote
Episode 67 (Tuesday, 6 September)	Lali	3	Tomás Sagués	"Un pacto"	Public's vote
Episode 67 (Tuesday, 6 September)	Lali	4	Juan Manuel Godoy	"Amarte así"	Eliminated
Episode 67 (Tuesday, 6 September)	Montaner	1	Elías Pardal	"Tengo"	Public's vote
Episode 67 (Tuesday, 6 September)	Montaner	2	Emanuel Cerrudo	"Tan enamorados"	Eliminated
Episode 67 (Tuesday, 6 September)	Montaner	3	Naiquén Galizio	"Qué ganas de no verte nunca más"	Public's vote
Episode 67 (Tuesday, 6 September)	Montaner	4	Julia Ferrón	"The Power of Love"	Eliminated
Episode 68 (Wednesday, 7 September)	Soledad	1	Yhosva Montoya	"Hoy"	Public's vote
Episode 68 (Wednesday, 7 September)	Soledad	2	Huilen Currá	"Como dos extraños"	Public's vote
Episode 68 (Wednesday, 7 September)	Soledad	3	Damián Ayala	"Oración del remanso"	Eliminated
Episode 68 (Wednesday, 7 September)	Soledad	4	Martín Ronconi	"La leyenda del hada y el mago"	Eliminated
Episode 68 (Wednesday, 7 September)	Mau & Ricky	1	Francisco Escudero	"Heaven"	Eliminated
Episode 68 (Wednesday, 7 September)	Mau & Ricky	2	Iván Papetti	"I Dreamed a Dream"	Public's vote
Episode 68 (Wednesday, 7 September)	Mau & Ricky	3	Cecilia Mirabile	"Million Reasons"	Eliminated
Episode 68 (Wednesday, 7 September)	Mau & Ricky	4	Octavio Muratore	"Como pájaros en el aire"	Public's vote

Non-competition performances
Episode	Artists	Song
68	Mau & Ricky	"No puede ser"

=== Semifinals ===
Episode	Coach	Artists	
Episode 69 (Thursday, 8 September)	Montaner	Elías Pardal	Naiquén Galizio
Episode 69 (Thursday, 8 September)	Soledad	Yhosva Montoya	Huilen Currá
Episode 69 (Thursday, 8 September)	Mau & Ricky	Iván Papetti	Octavio Muratore
Episode 69 (Thursday, 8 September)	Lali	Ángela Navarro	Tomás Sagués

=== Finale ===
Episode	Coach	Artist	Result
Episode 70 (Sunday, 11 September)	Montaner	Elías Pardal	Fourth place
Episode 70 (Sunday, 11 September)	Soledad	Yhosva Montoya	Advanced to round 2
Episode 70 (Sunday, 11 September)	Mau & Ricky	Iván Papetti	Third place
Episode 70 (Sunday, 11 September)	Lali	Ángela Navarro	Advanced to round 2
Episode 71 (Monday, 12 September)	Soledad	Yhosva Montoya	Winner
Episode 71 (Monday, 12 September)	Lali	Ángela Navarro	Runner-up

== Elimination chart ==
=== Color key ===
Artist's info

- Team Montaner
- Team Soledad
- Team Mau y Ricky
- Team Lali

Result details

- Winner
- Runner-up
- Third place
- Fourth place
- Saved by the public
- Eliminated

=== Overall ===
Live shows' results
Artists	Round of 33	Round of 25	Quarterfinals	Semifinals	Finale
Yhosva Montoya	Safe	Safe	Safe	Safe	Winner
Ángela Navarro	Safe	Safe	Safe	Safe	Runner-up
Iván Papetti	Safe	Safe	Safe	Safe	Third place
Elías Pardal	Safe	Safe	Safe	Safe	Fourth place
Tomás Sagués	Safe	Safe	Safe	Eliminated	Eliminated (semifinals)
Octavio Muratore	Safe	Safe	Safe	Eliminated	Eliminated (semifinals)
Huilén Currá	Safe	Safe	Safe	Eliminated	Eliminated (semifinals)
Naiquén Galizio	Safe	Safe	Safe	Eliminated	Eliminated (semifinals)
Cecilia Mirabile	Safe	Safe	Eliminated	Eliminated (quarterfinals)	
Francisco Escudero	Safe	Safe	Eliminated	Eliminated (quarterfinals)	
Damián Ayala	Safe	Safe	Eliminated	Eliminated (quarterfinals)	
Martín Ronconi	Safe	Safe	Eliminated	Eliminated (quarterfinals)	
Julia Ferrón	Safe	Safe	Eliminated	Eliminated (quarterfinals)	
Emanuel Cerrudo	Safe	Safe	Eliminated	Eliminated (quarterfinals)	
Emilia Soler	Safe	Safe	Eliminated	Eliminated (quarterfinals)	
Juan Manuel Godoy	Safe	Safe	Eliminated	Eliminated (quarterfinals)	
Juana Bestard Pino	Safe	Eliminated	Eliminated (round of 25)		
Jazmín Sparta	Safe	Eliminated	Eliminated (round of 25)		
Alejo Álvarez	Safe	Eliminated	Eliminated (round of 25)		
Dandara Guinaraes	Safe	Eliminated	Eliminated (round of 25)		
Leonardo Jurado	Safe	Eliminated	Eliminated (round of 25)		
Renato Barbieri	Safe	Eliminated	Eliminated (round of 25)		
Andrés Cantos	Safe	Eliminated	Eliminated (round of 25)		
Ignacio Pereira	Safe	Eliminated	Eliminated (round of 25)		
Luciana Araya	Safe	Eliminated	Eliminated (round of 25)		
Morena López Díaz	Eliminated	Eliminated (round of 33)			
Stefano Marocco	Eliminated	Eliminated (round of 33)			
Julieta Celiz	Eliminated	Eliminated (round of 33)			
Sofía Maquieira	Eliminated	Eliminated (round of 33)			
Luzía Cavallini	Eliminated	Eliminated (round of 33)			
Florencia Bonavida	Eliminated	Eliminated (round of 33)			
María Belén del Greco	Eliminated	Eliminated (round of 33)			
Alfredo Oviedo	Eliminated	Eliminated (round of 33)			
