= Monte Partido =

Monte Partido de San Miguel del Monte
- Department
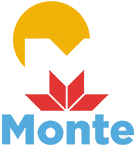
- Logo

- location of Partido de San Miguel del Monte in Buenos Aires Province
- Coordinates: 35°27′S 58°47′W
- Country: Argentina
- Established: November 18, 1779
- Founded by: Virrey Vértiz
- Seat: Monte

Government
  - Intendant: José Matildo Castro (UCR)

Area
  - Total: 1,847 km^{2} (713 sq mi)

Population
  - Total: 17,488
  - Density: 9.468/km^{2} (24.52/sq mi)
- Demonym: montense
- Postal Code: B7220
- IFAM: BUE083
- Area Code: 02271
- Website: www.monte.gov.ar

Monte Partido (also known as San Miguel del Monte) is a partido in the eastern part of Buenos Aires Province in Argentina.

The provincial subdivision has a population of about 17,500 inhabitants in an area of 1,847 km^{2} (713 sq mi), and its capital city is Monte, 110 km (68 mi) from Buenos Aires on the banks of the Salado River.

== Geography ==
The northwest course of the Salado borders with the Partidos of Roque Pérez and General Belgrano. Monte lies in the Humid Pampa, a flat rich-soiled agricultural zone. Drainage is insufficient due to the minimal sloping of the land which causes frequent floods in the area.

=== Climate ===
Monte has a temperate climate, with average temperatures of 17 °C (63 °F). The median temperature of the warmest month is 25 °C (77 °F) and the coldest is 10 °C (50 °F). Annual precipitation is 1,000 mm (39.4 in).

=== Borders ===
- Northeast with Cañuelas
- West with Roque Pérez
- Southwest with General Belgrano
- South with General Paz

== Settlements ==
- Abbott
- San Miguel del Monte
- Zenón Videla Dorna

== Tourism ==
=== Fishing and water sports ===
- Laguna de Monte: 7.2 km^{2} (1,800 acres) lake
- Laguna de Las Perdices: 12 km^{2} (3,000 acres) lake
- Other lakes: 16 km^{2} (4,000 acres) lake

=== Ranches ===
- Estancia "El Rosario": Antonio Dorna, a rancher built his ranch in the late 18th century on the banks of the Salado River. It is open to the public.
