= Virus (Argentine band) =

Argentine new wave music band

- Origin: La Plata, Argentina
- Genres: Argentine rock, new wave, synthpop, post-punk, rock en español
- Years active: 1979–1990; 1994–present
- Label: Sony Music
- Members: Marcelo Moura; Julio Moura; Daniel Sbarra; Ariel Naon; Fernando Monteleone; Nicolás Ménde
- Past members: Federico Moura; Ricardo Serra; Pablo Mugica; Enrique Mugetti; Mario Serra; Aitor Graña; Ludo Isod; Patricio Fontana

Virus is an Argentine new wave music band founded in 1979, led by Federico Moura until his death on December 21, 1988, from AIDS-related complications. His brother Marcelo then became lead singer, until the band gave its final performance on September 29, 1990, in a support slot to David Bowie. An instant hit, they represented along Soda Stereo and other upcoming bands from the moment the New Wave sound which contrasted with the previous staple rock genres of the preceding decades.

Roberto Jacoby wrote the group's lyrics from its beginning. Some of their best-known songs are "Amor Descartable," "Wadu Wadu," "Hay que salir del agujero interior," "Una luna de miel en la mano," "¿Qué hago en Manila?," "Sin Disfraz," "Imágenes paganas," and "Mirada Speed."

== History ==
=== Beginnings ===
The history of the Virus band dates back to 1979, when the Marabunta band decided to merge with the Las Violetas band to create a new group called "Duro", a band made up of Laura Gallegos (vocals), Julio Moura (guitar and backing vocals), Ricardo Serra (guitar), Marcelo Moura (percussion and backing vocals), Mario Serra (drums) and Enrique Mugetti (bass).

While they were satisfied with the sound of their music, they believed that they should have a male singer, so they started looking for a new singer. Federico Moura joined as the new singer and leader of the group. Later Federico, decided to return to Argentina. Laura Gallegos left the position of singer in the band, and Marcelo Moura went from percussion to keyboards; however, Mario Serra continued to be the band's drummer. Before going to look for Federico Moura in Brazil, Julio and Moura worked as qualified painters in the more affluent area of La Plata.

With Federico as singer, the band decided to change the name "Duro" to "Virus". The new name arose because Julio Moura had contracted a strong case of the flu on a trip and his friends joked with him, saying "Virus". The band rehearsed intensively for a year, and officially debuted on January 11, 1980, at a club in the city of La Plata, just the same day that Marcelo turned 20.

On September 21, 1981, Virus made their first public presentation at the Prima Rock Festival, in Ezeiza, Buenos Aires. At that festival, the sound and aesthetics of Virus were not well received by the audience that attended (who were almost entirely hippies). The attendees began to throw oranges at them and turned their backs on them. As Federico kicked the oranges aimed at him, he provoked the audience by saying, "I'll lift' my ass off the floor, and we danced a bit. Show how you make your legs shake!". According to Marcelo Moura's stories, I walk down the stage crying Federico told him: "Boludo (phrase commonly used in Argentina), didn't you realize that while they threw oranges at us they were dancing?."

Virus reunited in 1994 and has had some sporadic activity, without recovering its previous popularity. Their latest album, Caja Negra (2006) features live versions of their classics, together with five new studio tracks, with invited artists influenced by the band: Ale Sergi (Miranda!), Adrián Dárgelos (Babasónicos), Pity Álvarez (Intoxicados) and Ciro Pertusi (Attaque 77).

== Members ==
Current members

- Marcelo Moura — lead vocals (1987–present), keyboards, synthesizers, piano, percussion, vocals (1980-2004), bass, guitar (1995-2006)
- Julio Moura — guitar, percussion, vocals (1980–present), keyboards (1980-2009)
- Daniel Sbarra — guitar, keyboards, synthesizers, percussion, backing vocals (1984–1988, 1994–present)
- Ariel Naon — bass, contrabass, backing vocals (2006–present), guitar, keyboards (2009–present)
- Fernando Monteleone — keyboards, synthesizers, programming, backing vocals (2006–present)
- Nicolás Méndez — drums, percussion (2009–present)

Former members

- Federico Moura — lead vocals, guitar, bass, keyboards, synthesizers, percussion (1980-1988, died 1988)
- Ricardo Serra — guitar, backing vocals (1980-1984)
- Pablo Mugica — bass, percussion, backing vocals (1989-1990)
- Enrique Mugetti — bass (1980-1989, 1994–2004), keyboards, synthesizers, backing vocals (1980-2004), guitar (1995-2004)
- Mario Serra — drums, percussion, backing vocals (1980-1995)
- Aitor Graña — drums, percussion, programming (1995-2006)
- Ludo Isod — drums, percussion (2006-2009)
- Patricio Fontana — keyboards, synthesizers (1994-1995), bass, guitar (1995-2004)

== Discography ==
Studio albums

- Wadu-Wadu (1981)
- Recrudece (1982)
- Agujero interior (1983)
- Relax (1984)
- Locura (1985)
- Virus vivo (1986)
- Superficies de placer (1987)
- Tierra del fuego (1989)
- 9 (1998)

== Sources ==
- Argentine Rock Website (in Spanish)
