= Roberto Jacoby =

Argentine artist (born 1944)

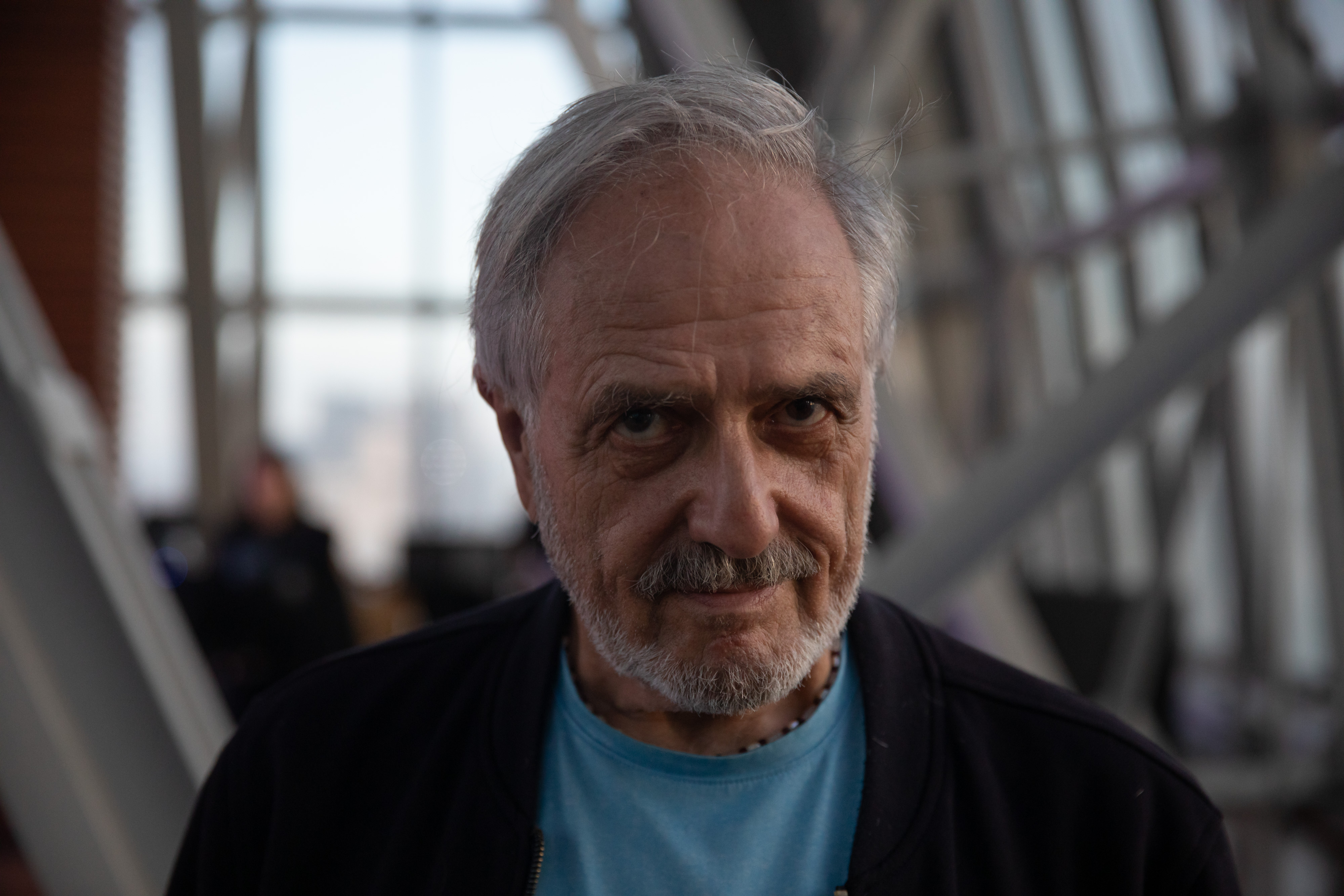
- Born: 29 July 1944 (age 81); Buenos Aires, Argentine
- Education: Colegio Nacional de Buenos Aires (CNBA) University of Buenos Aires
- Occupation(s): artist, sociologist
- Known for: Conceptual art, political influence
- Notable work: Happening para un jabalí difunto (Happening for a Dead Boar) Message in the Di Tella (Mensaje en el Di Tella)
- Movement: Conceptualism

Roberto Jacoby (born 1944) is an Argentine artist and sociologist. Known for his conceptual art and social activism in Argentine politics, most of his work is collaborative such as his displays in Experiencias and participation in Tucumán Arde.

== Biography ==
Jacoby was born to immigrants in Buenos Aires in 1944. He graduated from Colegio Nacional de Buenos Aires (CNBA) and studied sociology at the University of Buenos Aires. He is a member of the so-called "generación del Di Tella" and is considered one of the first conceptual artists in the world. He is particularly known for his participation in many controversial and political exhibitions, such as "Experiencias 68" and "Tucumán Arde".

In 1966, along with Eduardo Costa and Raúl Escari, he worked to promote the use of alternate mediums for art such as communications media. His work reflects this, including a vast array of mediums such as installations, performances, drawings, viewer participation, comics, photographs, videos, and more, with very few of his works holding any visual similarities to each other.

Later, he largely left the Argentine art scene to engage in more directly political subjects such as social conflict and political epistemology. He would later write a book, though it currently remains unpublished- Storming Heaven (El asalto al cielo)- containing information about the research he did on those. To counter the rising fear over political crisis in Argentina, he began to make some artistic contributions once again, such as writing for the Argentine band Virus that began a new Argentine rock wave on the 1980s.

Happening for a Dead Boar

Together with Costa and Escari, the three artists collaborated to make Happening para un jabalí difunto (Happening for a Dead Boar) in 1966. Inspired by Oscar Masotta's declaration that 'the medium is the message', their purpose was to use mass media as their primary art medium so as to question its power in society.

In a piece that would later be seen as crucial in Jacoby's conceptualist works, he published his essay Against the Happening which called into question the reliability of media narrative. The trio spread word of a 'Happening' distributed through traditional media outlets, only to reveal months later, that there was not, in fact, any such event. Their art seemed to render not only the object medium of art, but any art event superfluous, a new 'genre' of art they referred to as Arte de los Medios de Comunicación de Masas (art of the mass media). This 'exhibition' was meant to draw public attention to the failings of media- specifically photographic media- and the dangers of assuming its honesty or accuracy.

Experiencias del '68

In 1967, a man named Romero Brest decided to try and change the barriers or wealth required to enjoy art in the Instituto Torcuato Di Tella (ITDT); he decided to try and do this with Experiencias. These works, like many beginning conceptualist works at the time, were meant to be pieces where the viewer could see the fusion of life and art. Brest wanted the viewers to directly interact the artist's experiences rather than view those experiences through the lens of their art. Roberto Jacoby was one artist chosen to participate in this exhibition. The project fit well into his values – especially that of using and allowing art to reach wide audiences – displaying Message in the Di Tella (Mensaje en el Di Tella) in the '68 exhibition. The piece criticized art world standards and culture, and predicted that in the near future that art and life would not stay segregated: "The future is linked not to the creation of works but to the design of new forms of life". When the exhibition was censured, he, along with his fellow artists, destroyed their work in the streets before Di Tella to protest police intervention in what would be seen as the breaking point between the artists and the Di Tella art institution.

Tucumán Arde

Tucumán Arde (Tucumán is Burning) was an art exhibition that took place in 1968 meant to protest the Argentinian government and create political conversations about the events and tragedies occurring at the time. The exhibition consisted of a group of artists spreading knowledge and insight into the misfortunes and social injustices which threatened the Argentine public at the time. took place in Rosario and then later in Buenos Aires. Due to the controversial nature of the exhibition, shortly after it began, many of the works were removed or destroyed in order to protect the identities of those who participated. Much of this erasure happened before the art exhibit was recorded; as a result, while it is commonly acknowledged that Jacoby participated in Tucumán Arde, very little is known about what his artistic contribution to the exhibition was exactly.

Departure From Art

Near the end of 1968, Jacoby left the art scene. He believed that art had explored all possible avenues possible in order to make a meaningful impact in politics. He said that the artists of Argentina had worn art to the limits, both as a way to create cultural change, and in terms of what could be thought. Jacoby felt that his work for the Happening and with Masotta himself "had reached a sort of maximum degree of abstraction", so there was nothing left for it to say.

However, despite his withdrawal from the art scene, Jacoby was far from finished with the political sphere. Around 1969, he started working with the Centro de Investigación en Ciencias Sociales (Center for Research in the Social Sciences) or CISCO in an attempt to bridge the gaps between knowledge and action.

Strategy of Joy

Nearing the end of the dictatorship, Jacoby began to engage in artistic avenues once again. This was a part of his so-called "Strategy of Joy". In his own words:

“...the strategy of joy was directly tied to a superabundance of fear. At that time, I first understood how wonderful it was that there were people dancing and making such joyous music… I realized that that’s infectious… Joy keeps you going when you are in situations steeped in terror, which we had been in, right?”

Jacoby hoped that by promoting joy, people would begin to overcome the pervading fear within the populace. His strategy was about the celebration of being alive and disobeying disciplinary norms. To this end, he collaborated with singer Federico Moura to wrote songs and helped design shows- including small, subversive details, like standing and dancing during the concert, which was outside of the norm at the time- for Moura's Argentine rock band known as Virus. The music and shows were not without political impact however, and often contained criticisms of the régime.

== Works ==
- Maqueta de una obra (Scale Model of an Artwork), 1966

A pre-working for a sculpture that was never produced. This piece includes a sketch, a text, and a scale model, but the point of the piece was that it was never finished. Instead, the viewer must become an active participant and use their imagination to "finish" the work.

- Mao y Perón, un solo corazón (Mao and Perón, A Single Heart), 1967

During gathering in Central Park, Jacoby pinned photographs of Mao Zedong and of Juan Perón (who the Argentine Left believed would lead a socialist revolution upon his return from exile) to his chest. Based on a school rally chant, Jacoby's title joins the two historical figures through rhyme, seemingly mocking the 'surety' of Perón's adherence to Leftist ideologies.

- Mensaje en el Di Tella (Message in the Di Tella), 1968

In three parts, this work consisted of a manifesto poster, a teletype receiving real-time news from France in May 1968, and a photograph of an anti-war protester. The work was meant to emphasize Jacoby's belief that the action and ideas, not the medium, of political art was important.

- Yo tengo Sida (I have AIDS), 1993

An awareness campaign done in collaboration with Mariana "Kiwi" Sainz, "I have AIDS" was something of a performance piece which consisted of celebrities such as the singer Andres Calamaro wearing printed shirts with this phrase on it. The campaign was designed to be a stand against the discrimination faced by HIV-positive people.

- Other works

== Exhibitions ==
- Roberto Jacoby: El deseo nace del derrumbe (The desire is born of the collapse), 25 February – 25 May 2011
- Roberto Jacoby & Alejandro Ros: Abertura, 1 August – 1 September 2013
