= Roque Pérez =

- Location in Argentina
- Coordinates: 35°25′S 59°19′W
- Country: Argentina
- Province: Buenos Aires
- Partido: Roque Pérez
- Founded: 21 September 1884
- Elevation: 26 m (85 ft)

Population (2001 census [INDEC])
  - Total: 10,902
- CPA Base: B 7245
- Area code: +54 2227
- Website: http://www.rperez.mun.gba.gob.ar/

Roque Pérez is a town in Buenos Aires Province, Argentina. It is the administrative headquarters for Roque Pérez Partido.

== Notable people ==
- Jorge Dalto, pianist (1948–1987)
- Ricardo Villa, football coach and former professional midfielder, most notably for Tottenham Hotspur (born 1952)
