= Una luna de miel en la mano =

Single by Virus

from the album Locura
- Language: Spanish
- B-side: "Destino circular"
- Released: 1985
- Recorded: 1985
- Studio: Estudios SIC Americana, Buenos Aires; Sound Ideas Studios, New York City
- Genre: Synthpop; new wave
- Length: 5:17 (album version); 3:59 (single version)
- Label: CBS
- Songwriter(s): Federico Moura; Eduardo Costa
- Producer(s): Virus; Oscar López

Virus singles chronology
"Pronta entrega" (1985)	"Una luna de miel en la mano" (1985)	"Imágenes paganas" (1986)

"Una luna de miel en la mano" (pronounced [una ˈluna ðe ˈmjel en la ˈmano]; Spanish for "a honeymoon in the hand")—often referred to as "Luna de miel"—is a song by Argentine new wave band Virus, taken from their fifth studio album Locura.

== Background and production ==
"Una luna de miel en la mano" was the last song written for Locura. Virus had already recorded seven tracks for the album, but the label demanded that eight was the minimum. It was composed on a plane as the band headed to New York City, where they worked on the album's mixing. In 2015, Marcelo Moura recalled: "As we had recorded in Buenos Aires, when we travelled to New York to mix, on the plane (when you could still smoke in a sector) we went with Julio and Federico [Moura] with a guitar and we made a base, we composed the missing song. [...] It was something very improvised and is, nothing more and nothing less, the most famous track in Virus' history." Having arrived to New York, Federico's friend Eduardo Acosta wrote the song's lyrics. He would later also write the lyrics for "Encuentro en el río musical", a song from the band's 1987 album Superficies de placer.

== Composition ==
In 2012, the Argentine edition of Rolling Stone considered the song's lyrics to be an example of the band's characteristic use of ambiguity and provocation. Like other compositions from Locura, it features sexual metaphors, although in a less explicit manner than songs like "Pronta entrega" or "Sin disfraz". The song's lyrics are an ode to masturbation that use intricate metaphors. They are inspired by a fictional play that appears in James Joyce's 1922 novel Ulysses, composed by character Buck Mulligan and titled Everyman His Own Wife Or, A Honeymoon in the Hand: A National Immorality in Three Orgasms.

== Credits and personnel ==
Credits adapted from the liner notes of Locura.

Virus

- Federico Moura – vocals
- Marcelo Moura – keyboard
- Julio Moura – guitar
- Enrique Mugetti – bass
- Daniel Sbarra – guitar and keyboard
- Mario Serra – percussion

Production

- Virus – artistic production, arrangement, production
- Toby Scott – engineer (at Sound Ideas Studios, New York)
- Osbel – engineer (at Estudios SIC Americana, Buenos Aires)
- Oscar López – production

== See also ==
- Argentine rock
- 1985 in music
- LGBT music
