= Zenón Videla Dorna =

- Location within Buenos Aires Province
- Coordinates: 35°33′S 58°53′W
- Country: Argentina
- Province: Buenos Aires
- Partido: Monte

Population (2010 Census)
  - Total: 76
- Time zone: UTC−3 (ART)
- CPA Base: B 2271
- Climate: Dfc

Zenón Videla Dorna is a locality located in the Monte Partido of Buenos Aires Province in Argentina.
