= Abbott, Argentina =

Abbott
- Location within Buenos Aires Province
- Coordinates: 35°19′S 58°46′W
- Country: Argentina
- Province: Buenos Aires
- Partido: Monte

Population (2010 Census)
  - Total: 603
- Time zone: UTC−3 (ART)
- CPA Base: B 2271
- Climate: Dfc

Abbott is a locality located in the Monte Partido of Buenos Aires Province in Argentina.
