= Roque Pérez Partido =

Roque Pérez Partido de Roque Pérez
- Department
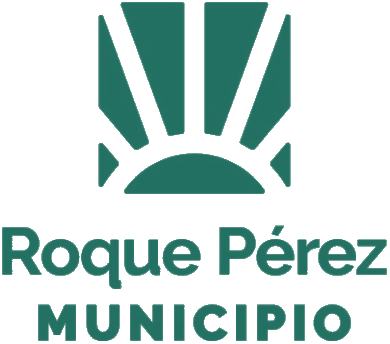

- location of Roque Pérez in Buenos Aires Province
- Coordinates: 35°25′S 59°19′W
- Country: Argentina
- Established: June 24, 1913
- Founder: provincial law
- Seat: Roque Pérez

Government
  - Intendant: Maximiliano Sciaini (Union for the Homeland)

Area
  - Total: 1,600 km^{2} (620 sq mi)

Population
  - Total: 10,902
  - Density: 6.8/km^{2} (18/sq mi)
- Demonym: roqueperense
- Postal Code: B7245
- IFAM: BUE106
- Area Code: 02227
- Patron saint: John the Baptist
- Website: www.rperez.mun.gba.gob.ar

Roque Peréz Partido is a partido of Buenos Aires Province in Argentina.

The provincial subdivision has a population of about 11,000 inhabitants in an area of 1,600 km^{2} (620 sq mi), and its capital city is Roque Pérez, which is around 135 km (84 mi) from Buenos Aires.
