= Federico Moura =

Argentine singer, songwriter and fashion designer

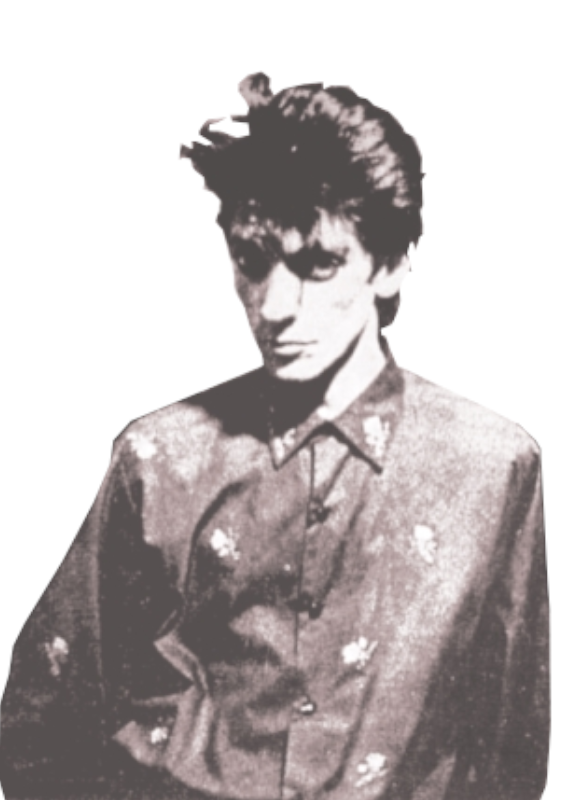
- Moura in 1985
- Born: Federico José Moura; 23 October 1951; Berisso, Buenos Aires Province, Argentina
- Died: 21 December 1988 (aged 37); Buenos Aires, Argentina
- Education: Colegio Nacional de La Plata
- Alma mater: National University of La Plata
- Occupations: Singer; songwriter; record producer; fashion designer
- Years active: 1967–1988
- Musical career
- Genres: Argentine rock, synth pop, new wave
- Instruments: Vocals; guitar; bass; synthesiser
- Label: Sony Music

Federico José Moura (23 October 1951 – 21 December 1988) was an Argentine singer, songwriter, record producer, fashion designer and lead vocalist of the new wave rock band Virus, formed with his brothers Julio and Marcelo in 1981. Moura is now regarded as one of the most recognizable and influential musicians of Spanish-language rock.

== Early life ==
Federico José Moura was born on 23 October 1951 in La Plata in Buenos Aires Province, Argentina. His father was Pico Moura, a lawyer, and his mother was Velia Oliva, a schoolteacher and amateur pianist. He was the youngest of four brothers; his eldest brother, Jorge, was an active member of the People's Revolutionary Army (ERP), and was kidnapped and disappeared in 1977 by the last military dictatorship in Argentina (1976–1983).

Federico showed interest in music from a young age, and he began playing guitar and piano aged four. He finished high school at the Colegio Nacional de La Plata and enrolled at the National University of La Plata. Like his older brothers, in his youth he played rugby at the La Plata Rugby Club.

Like his brother Jorge, Federico was involved in the siloist movement, founded by Mario Rodríguez Cobos, who would later form the Humanist Movement.

== Musical career ==
In his teenage years, Moura played the bass in Dulcemembriyo, a rock group with which he toured across Latin America. He then formed part of Las Violetas and Marabunta. Toward the end of the 1970s, Moura was enlisted by his brothers Julio and Marcelo to be the lead vocalist of their band Duro; Julio played the guitar and Marcelo the keyboard, alongside Enrique Muguetti (bass) and the brothers Ricardo (second guitar) and Mario Serra (drums). The group started going by Virus in 1981. In January of that year, the band had their first gig at the Asociación Universal in La Plata. In September 1981, Virus had their first major presentation in Ezeiza, and a week later, they began recording at CBS Records. The band's first EP, Wadu-Wadu, was released that same year. In a time wherein social commentary and serious topics dominated the lyrics of Argentine rock, Virus were accused of being too frivolous, releasing danceable songs with irony-filled lyrics. Federico's flamboyant poise and his open homosexuality earned reactions from both the public and the media, and, as the band's most visible member, Virus quickly became identifiable for Federico.

In 1982, during the Falklands War, Virus were invited by the military regime alongside other major acts in the local rock scene (such as León Gieco, Luis Alberto Spinetta and Charly García) to participate in the Festival de la Solidaridad Latinoamericana ("Latin American Solidarity Festival"), but the band refused to partake. The song El Banquete ("The Banquet"), included in their album Recrudece (1982) and released after the Argentine defeat in the war and the resignation of General Galtieri, addressed the incident.

Virus's breakout moment came with the 1984 album Agujero interior, and they reached their peak popularity in 1985 with Locura, the latter of which includes a number of veiled references and commentary, such as the lyrics of Sin disfraz ("Without Disguise"), which playfully retorts a CBS executive who had allegedly suggested Federico hide his homosexuality to avoid losing some of the band's female fans. According to Roberto Jacoby, the sociologist who wrote many of the band's lyrics during this era and author of Sin disfraz, the song became a sort of "work anthem" for male prostitutes.

In 1987, while the band was stationed in Rio de Janeiro recording Superficies de placer, Moura began feeling ill and, upon a family physician's recommendation, he was tested for HIV/AIDS. He tested positive. Some of the songs in Superficies de placer, released that year, reference Moura's awareness of his poor condition and the proximity of his own death. He is credited as the lyricist for Rumbos secretos, Ausencia and Transeúnte sin identidad. The band's last live show with Federico took place on 21 May 1988 at the Teatro Fénix in Flores, later on Federico retired to spend the next following months in peace away from the media.

== Death ==
In mid-October 1988, Moura was hospitalized at the CEMIC in Recoleta, Buenos Aires. He died on 21 December of that year in his San Telmo apartment from a respiratory arrest; He only weighted 36 kg. (79 pounds). He was accompanied by his mother Velia. He was interred at the Chacarita Cemetery. In 2004, Federico's remains were exhumed by his brothers Marcelo and Julio, to be cremated and his ashes scattered at the Río de la Plata.

== Discography ==
With Virus

- Wadu-Wadu (1981)
- Recrudece (1982)
- Agujero interior (1983)
- Relax (1984)
- Locura (1985)
- Virus vivo (1986)
- Superficies de placer (1987)

As soloist

- "A Mí Me Dicen el Tonto" (with Daniel Sbarra), from Leda Valladares' album, Grito en el Cielo Vol. 1 (1989)
- "En Atamisqui" (with Daniel Sbarra), from Leda Valladares' album, Grito en el Cielo Vol. 2 (1990)
