= San Miguel del Monte =

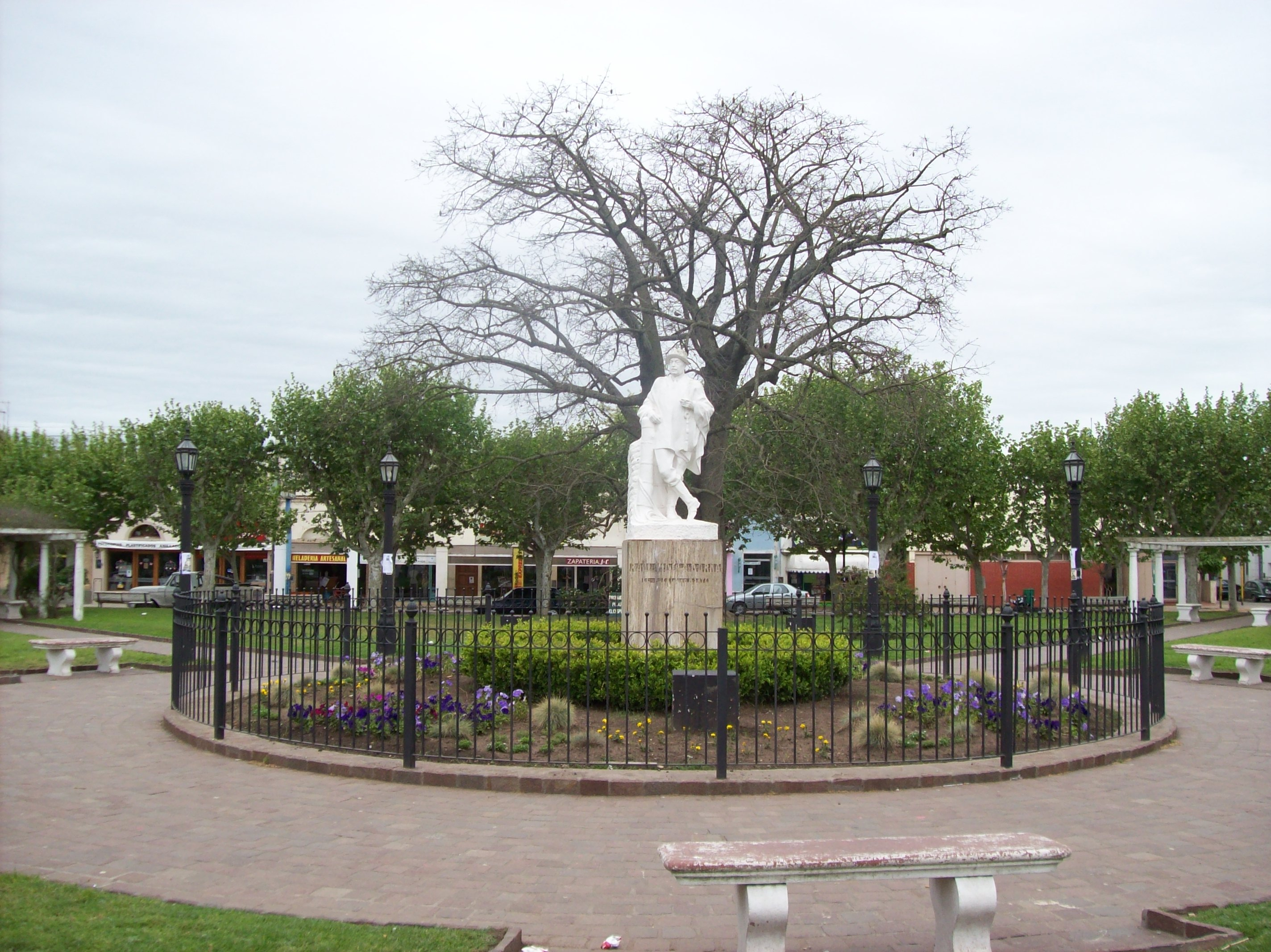
- Monument to Raúl Videla Dorna, Adolfo Alsina Square
- Interactive map of San Miguel del Monte
- Coordinates: 35°26′30″S 58°48′30″W
- Country: Argentina
- Province: Buenos Aires
- Partido: Monte
- Established: 1864

Population (2001 census [INDEC])
  - Total: 13,384
- CPA Base: B 7220
- Area code: +54 2271

San Miguel del Monte (also known as Monte) is a town in Buenos Aires Province, Argentina. It is the county seat of Monte Partido, and was established in 1864.

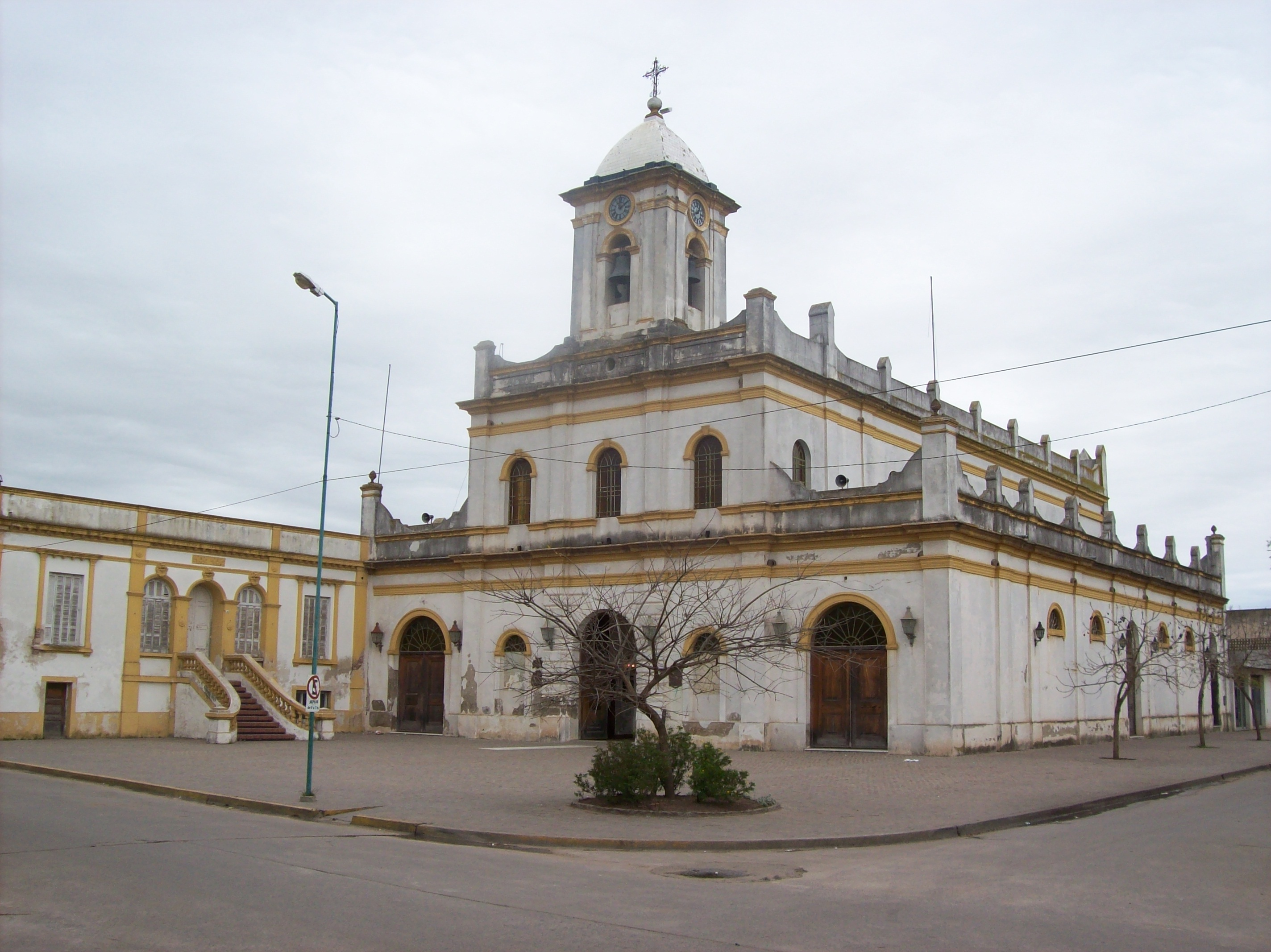
Parish of St. Michael the Archangel

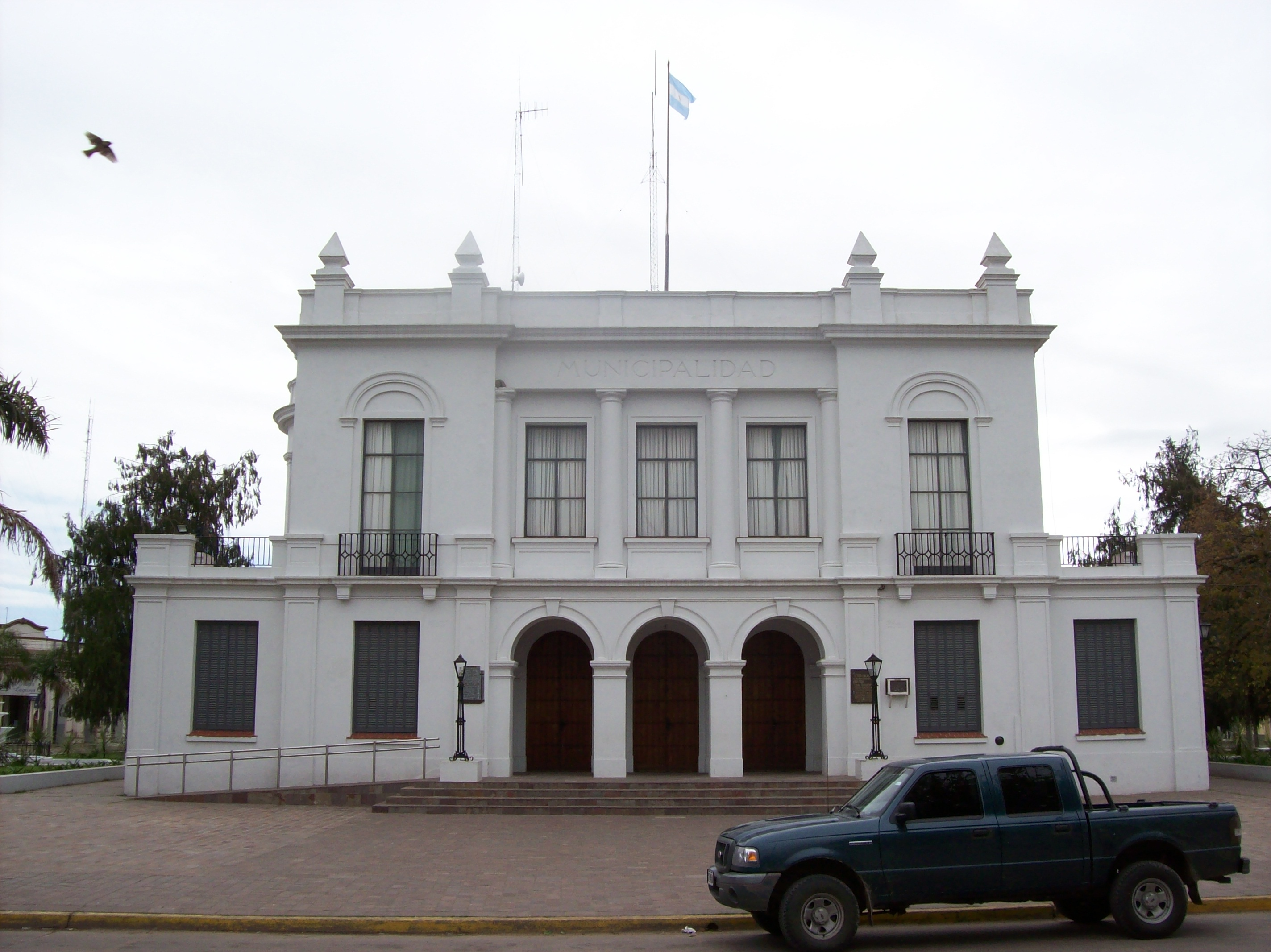
City Hall

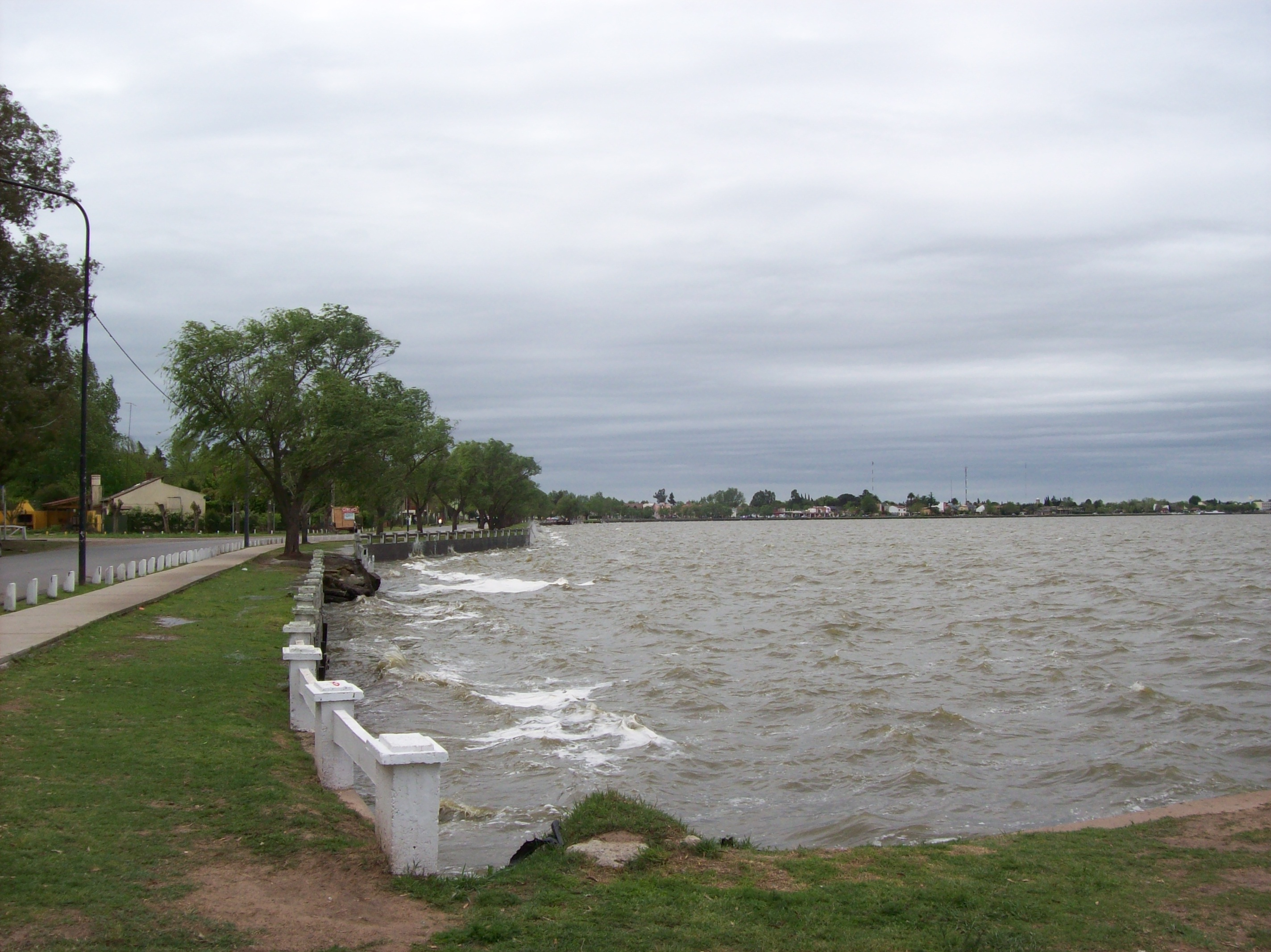
Laguna del Monte
