= Dynamo (Soda Stereo album) =

Studio album by Soda Stereo
- Released: 26 October 1992
- Recorded: Buenos Aires, 1992
- Genres: Shoegaze, alternative dance
- Length: 56:27
- Labels: Sony Music; Columbia
- Producers: Gustavo Cerati; Zeta Bosio

Soda Stereo chronology
Rex Mix (1991)	Dynamo (1992)	Zona de Promesas (1993)

Singles from Dynamo
- 1. "Primavera 0" Released: 1992; 2. "Luna roja" Released: 1992; 3. "Ameba" Released: 1993; 4. "En remolinos" Released: 1993

Professional ratings
Review scores
Source	Rating
AllMusic	3/5 stars

Dynamo (pronounced [ˈdi.na.mo]) is the sixth studio album by Argentinian rock band Soda Stereo. It was first released in Argentina on 26 October 1992 by Sony Music Argentina.

Considered the band's "most eclectic, most ignored and most experimental work", as well as "the least popular and the most pretentious", they made heavy use of the sampler and set the sound treatment carefully, while still retaining the pop structure. Daniel Melero co-wrote some of the songs and played keyboards, but the strong influence he had over the band was reaching an end. Some fans didn't catch up with the band's intention, while others took it as a landmark of pop experimentation. Shortly after the release of Dynamo, Soda Stereo switched labels, moving from Sony Music to BMG. This fact conspired against the album's diffusion.

== Background and recording ==
Following the release of Soda Stereo's critically acclaimed fifth studio album Canción Animal in 1990, Soda had shot to international recognition, particularly with their rock anthem "De Música Ligera", which received vast airplay across Argentina. Shortly after the album's release, Soda embarked on an 81-show tour around Latin America and Spain, called Gira Animal.

In 1991, lead singer, guitarist and frontman Gustavo Cerati began a musical partnership with Daniel Melero of Argentine band Los Encargados, a longtime friend of Cerati's, previous collaborator of Soda Stereo's and lover of electronic music. Cerati found the change in genre especially constructive for composing songs and began honing the art of sampling, buying an Akai MPC and composing sample-based songs with Melero in Estudios Supersónico. This partnership would eventually culminate in the release of the Rex Mix EP (1991), as well as a Cerati-Melero collaboration, Colores Santos, in 1992, both of which draw heavy sonic influence from electronic music, the Madchester scene in the United Kingdom, and neo-psychedelia.

Guitarist and singer Gustavo Cerati (pictured) performing with Soda Stereo in Mexico City, 1993

Tired of playing their old material, Soda had already begun working on new music towards the tailend of the Gira Animal tour, after a brief pause in touring. Cerati said, "We made the decision to distance ourselves a little, to do other things, to open our heads a little bit, to travel and to get together when it was right. That's how it was." On top of Cerati's aforementioned influences coming into songwriting sessions, Soda also grew interested in alternative rock, impressed by the works of British shoegazing and dream pop bands such as My Bloody Valentine, Ultra Vivid Scene, Sonic Youth, Ride, Primal Scream, Spiritualized, and Lush. Immediately following the culmination of the tour in May 1992 by way of six shows in Spain, Soda Stereo began work on a new album, tentatively titled Gol, but renamed Dynamo after Melero made a comment about old bicycles having dynamos. Two of the three songs composed exclusively by Cerati, "En remolinos" and "Primavera 0", had allegedly already been written by the time the group returned to Buenos Aires. According to Cerati, much of the album's material was composed in jams and rehearsals, with the audio recorded in stereo and saved onto DAT's. Other songs, such as "Texturas", were based on old songs from the band's beginnings. Eventually, Cerati states, "twenty-something" songs were written for the album. Many of the rejects for Dynamo ended up on other albums; the song "Rombos", from Cerati's solo album "Amor Amarillo" (1993), was first written by Cerati for Dynamo, and documentary footage by Boy Olmi taken from the recording sessions shows Cerati playing the song to Bosio on his MPC. Other songs, such as "Zona de promesas", "Ángel eléctrico", and "Planeador", ended up on subsequent Soda projects.

Recording began in August 1992 in Estudios Supersónico in Buenos Aires, near Belgrano. Most of the lyrics were written in-studio, to the melodies. Meticulous about the album's sound, Cerati wished to "deform" the album sonically by constructing shoegaze-reminiscent walls of sound, while keeping the vocals in the foreground and executing powerful choruses characteristic of Soda's "heroic" trademark sound. In turn, he dominated the atmosphere of the studio vision-wise. In keeping with the album's electronic theme, songs such as "Camaleón", "Sweet Sahumerio", "Ameba", "Nuestra Fe", and "Claroscuro" were built around loops, synthesisers, and samplers such as Cerati's MPC60. Cerati, Bosio, and Melero contributed extensively to the album's artistic production. The recording sessions for the album took a notably experimental direction compared to past albums; for inspiration, the crew recorded raga rock track "Sweet Sahumerio" by holding an impromptu yoga class in the studio with Cerati's personal yoga trainer, and for the first time, enlisted the help of a local Hindu music band for instrumentation, including tabla, tambura, and sitar. Track 5, "Camaleón", was recorded in an unusual setup, with Cerati on bass guitar and Bosio on electric guitar (minus the solo at the end). Recording for the album culminated the following month with the recording of fifth single "Claroscuro".

== Composition ==
=== Music ===
When compared to past albums, Dynamo could perhaps be the most extreme one [we've] ever made, on account of the fact that there are so many elements from past albums that we took to the extreme here: from the sonic "maps" to the destructuring of the songs; from deeming playing with a song's sonic elements as being more important than its chords, to changing the way we approach vocals in a song or, for example, placing a guitar in front of an amplifier and seeing what happens.

— Gustavo Cerati, 1992

Dynamo showed a complete turnaround in the band's sound, headed towards a more alternative style. It is primarily a shoegaze and alternative rock album, while at the same time delving into neo-psychedelia, dream pop, noise rock, alternative dance, baggy, raga rock, and electronic music. The band wanted Dynamo to be eclectic in style, and tried to accentuate it by being as daring as possible with the genres they implemented, structuring the songs so that they contrasted with each other. Cerati saw this musical contrast as an allegory of the band's relationship at the moment the album was recorded.

According to Cerati, the sudden departure in style of Dynamo from the more accessible hard rock of Canción Animal came as a result of internal strains within the band stemming from the album's massive success. Cerati states that the band, "... decided to change [its] direction because we didn't want to keep inflating the monster that we'd created. We were fed up with the band, and I personally had little desire to continue, but after Spain we decided to face the challenge of not losing desire to keep making music."

"En Remolinos"
A section of "En Remolinos". Dynamo uses effects such as harmonisers and distortion to create a more "shoegaze-y" sound in comparison to its counterparts.

== Release ==
Dynamo was released in October 1992 in Latin America on cassette, compact disc, and vinyl. The Gira Dynamo began on 27 November 1992 with a presentation on the Argentine talk show Fax, and venue shows began in December 1992 in Buenos Aires. Throughout their shortened 31-show tour, Soda played in five countries: Argentina, Chile, Mexico, Paraguay, and Venezuela. Likely due to the album's low profile, television exposure of the shows was limited, and few audio and video recordings exist of the tour. Following news that Cerati's then-girlfriend Cecilia Amenábar was expecting their first child, the rest of the tour was cut short after a concert in Mexico City on 21 March 1993, as Cerati moved to Santiago to be with Amenábar and record Amor Amarillo, his first solo venture. This initiated an extended two-year hiatus of the band, which would only be interrupted by the 1995 release of Sueño Stereo, the band's final studio album. Shortly following the end of the tour, Soda Stereo became embroiled in a bitter legal battle with its label, Sony Music, and eventually left the label to sign with Ariola (then a subsidiary of BMG).

In 1993, Soda released Zona de Promesas, their third and final EP. The album contains several outtakes and remixes from Dynamo, including the titular B-side and several concert remixes of their past tracks.

The cover art and album design for Dynamo was created by Argentine graphic designers Gabriela Malerba and Alejandro Ros, who had been responsible for all of the band's cover art from Rex Mix onward. On the cover, the letters in Soda Stereo's name are stylised with numbers. According to Ros, the distinctive "heart" on the cover is actually a flower stand pinched to resemble a heart. Malerba and Ros made sure to particularly stress the album's theme of love in the art, with Ros stating that, "The idea of this album was love, the universe, conflict, and the pain that love entails." Ros states that the duo also wished to play with the idea of perspective, particularly how the latter can change one's perception and understanding of things and emotions. Ros attributes the duo's implementation of miniature planets to this concept.

== Track listing ==
All lyrics are written by Gustavo Cerati, except for "Toma la Ruta" by Cerati and Daniel Melero.

No.	Title	Writer(s)	Length
1.	"Secuencia Inicial" (Initial Sequence)	Cerati; Bosio	3:27
2.	"Toma la Ruta" (Take the Route)	Cerati; Bosio; Melero	4:30
3.	"En Remolinos" (In Swirls)	Cerati	4:42
4.	"Primavera 0" (Spring 0)	Cerati	3:36
5.	"Camaleón" (Chameleon)	Cerati; Bosio; Melero	4:43
6.	"Luna Roja" (Red Moon)	Cerati; Bosio	5:31
7.	"Sweet Sahumerio"	Cerati; Bosio; Alberti; Melero	6:03
8.	"Ameba" (Amoeba)	Cerati; Melero	4:16
9.	"Nuestra Fe" (Our Faith)	Cerati; Melero	6:37
10.	"Claroscuro" (Chiaroscuro)	Cerati; Bosio; Melero	4:05
11.	"Fue" ([It] Was)	Cerati	3:52
12.	"Texturas" (Textures)	Cerati; Bosio; Alberti	4:45

== Personnel ==
Soda Stereo

- Gustavo Cerati – lead vocals / guitars / bass guitar (on "Camaleón") / MPC60 / keyboards / producer / programming
- Zeta Bosio – bass guitar / guitar (on "Camaleón") / backing vocals / producer
- Charly Alberti – drums / percussion

Additional personnel

- Daniel Melero: sampler and keyboards, collaboration producer
- Tweety González: sampler
- Flavio Etcheto: trumpet
- Sanjay Bhadoriya: tabla and padhant (on "Sweet Sahumerio")
- Eduardo Blacher: tambura (on "Sweet Sahumerio")
- Roberto Zuczer: sitar

== Charts and sales ==
=== Year-end charts ===
Year-end chart performance for Dynamo
Chart (1992)	Position
Argentina (CAPIF)	15

=== Sales ===
Region	Certification	Certified units/sales
Argentina (CAPIF)	4× Platinum	>240,000
