= MTV Unplugged =

American television series

- Created by: Jim Burns; Robert Small
- Country of origin: United States

Production
- Running time: 60 minutes

Original release
- Network: MTV; MTV Live
- Release: November 26, 1989 – present

MTV Unplugged is an American television series on MTV. It showcases recorded live performances of popular music artists playing acoustic or "unplugged" variations of songs. The show aired regularly from 1989 to 1999. From 2000 to 2009, it aired less frequently and was usually billed as MTV Unplugged No. 2.0. Since 2009, MTV Unplugged specials have aired occasionally, sometimes through online or subscription only. Episodes and specials have tended to showcase one artist or group, playing a combination of their hit songs and covers.

Many of the artists who appeared on the show in the 1990s released their Unplugged session as an album, and some of these albums were commercial and critical hits. Eric Clapton's Unplugged (1992) sold 26 million copies worldwide and became the best-selling live album of all time. Albums such as Mariah Carey's MTV Unplugged (1992), Nirvana's MTV Unplugged in New York (1994) and Alice in Chains' Unplugged (1996) became notable hits of the program. Other Unplugged albums that went platinum include Rod Stewart's Unplugged...and Seated (1993), 10,000 Maniacs' MTV Unplugged (1993), Tony Bennett's MTV Unplugged (1994), Page and Plant's No Quarter (1994), Shakira's MTV Unplugged (1999), Lauryn Hill's MTV Unplugged No. 2.0 (2001), Alicia Keys' Unplugged (2005) and Ricky Martin's MTV Unplugged (2006). Some of these albums produced successful singles as well, including Mariah Carey's No. 1 hit cover of "I'll Be There".

The show received the George Foster Peabody Award and three Primetime Emmy nominations, in its original form. A limited-run reboot of MTV Unplugged came in 2009, featuring six acts, which won the Emmy Award for Best New Approach. Directed by Matthew C. Mills and produced by Spacestation in New York, the season featured Katy Perry, Adele, Paramore, Vampire Weekend, Silversun Pickups and All Time Low. It is the only season of MTV Unplugged to win an Emmy Award. As of 2021, several episodes are available to watch on Paramount+.

== Unplugged ==
The term "unplugged" has come to refer to music that would usually be played on electrified instruments (such as an electric guitar or synthesizer) but is rendered instead on instruments that can be played without electricity, for example acoustic guitar or traditional piano, although a microphone is still used. In most cases, the bass (or bass guitar) is amplified, and a Hammond organ is sometimes used.

MTV launched MTV Unplugged in 1989. The show featured musicians performing unplugged versions of their electric repertoire. Many of these performances were subsequently released as albums, often featuring the title Unplugged. It was believed that the show was inspired by a 1989 MTV Video Music Awards acoustic performance by Jon Bon Jovi and Richie Sambora; however, the show was already in production. Although the showrunners have admitted that prior to the influence of that performance, the show was initially meant to be only for "young, up-and-coming artists" rather than the "big, stadium, electric-arena-type acts".

== Launch of Unplugged ==
The MTV show titled Unplugged, drawing on this phenomenon, was created by producers Robert Small and Jim Burns. Songwriter Jules Shear hosted the first 13 episodes. The pilot and first seven episodes were produced by Bruce Leddy, after which Associate Producer Alex Coletti took over for the remainder of the series, producing the show through 2001. After the first 13 episodes, the role of host was eliminated. The show was produced by Viacom and RSE Inc and was most frequently directed by Milton Lage and Beth McCarthy.

The first episode of MTV Unplugged was taped on October 31, 1989, and aired about a month later on November 26.

== Selected list of artists ==
=== 1989–1992 ===
- The series first aired November 26, 1989, featuring Squeeze, Syd Straw and Elliot Easton. The first 13 episodes were hosted by American singer-songwriter Jules Shear and featured Aerosmith, Elton John, Sinéad O'Connor, Poison, Joe Satriani and Stevie Ray Vaughan among others.
- Joe Walsh appeared on the show in 1989 with Dr. John. According to the book I Want My MTV: The Uncensored Story of the Music Video Revolution by Rob Tannenbaum and Craig Marks, Walsh wanted to perform the Eagles classic "Desperado", but Joel Gallen received a three-page fax from Don Henley denying permission to use the song. MTV invited Henley to perform on the show, but Henley wanted to have a show featuring only himself. At that point, MTV was sharing the time between different artists. Dr. John was not originally scheduled to be part of the episode. With only Walsh booked, producers went next door where a VH1 morning show was being taped with Dr. John, and asked if he would be willing to join Walsh on Unplugged. Henley performed his solo episode in 1990.
- The Cure performed their MTV Unplugged session in their London studios on January 24, 1991. Their playlist featured classic songs such as "The Walk", "If Only Tonight We Could Sleep", "Just Like Heaven" and a new song, "A Letter to Elise", which would be released on their next album.
- Paul McCartney's 1991 appearance was later released on the Unplugged (The Official Bootleg) album.
- On March 5, 1991, Sting performed a set mostly centered around songs by The Police or from his album The Soul Cages. Sting enjoyed the experience to the extent that the following month he did a similar set in his home town of Newcastle at the tiny Buddle Arts Centre.
- On April 10, 1991, Unplugged aired its first ever acoustic rap show. The special kicked off with individual performances by LL Cool J along with MC Lyte (Cappucino), De La Soul (Ring Ring Ring), and A Tribe Called Quest ("Can I Kick It?") and a five-piece back-up band, Pop's Cool Love. The highlight of the show was LL Cool J's energetic renditions of "Jingling Baby" and "Mama Said Knock You Out".
- In 1992, Mariah Carey performed a cover version of The Jackson 5's hit "I'll Be There" along with backup singer Trey Lorenz. That live version was released as a single and went to No. 1 on the Billboard Hot 100, as well as in Canada, New Zealand, Netherlands, and became a hit elsewhere. Due to high demand, the performance was released as an EP, MTV Unplugged, which eventually sold over 10 million copies worldwide. The performance was released in video form as well, achieving success particularly in the US, Europe, Japan, and Australia.
- In 1992, Eric Clapton recorded an Unplugged performance at Bray Studios in London. He rearranged many of his classic songs for the acoustic context, and the resulting Unplugged album went on to become the best selling Unplugged album in the US and worldwide with sales of 10 million in the US and 26 million worldwide. Clapton earned six Grammy Awards for the album, including Record of the Year, Album of the Year, Song of the Year ("Tears in Heaven"), Best Male Pop Vocal Performance, Best Rock Male Vocal Performance and Best Rock Song.
- While MTV has filmed over 101 Unplugged performances, fewer than 30 of them have been released as albums. Pearl Jam's March 1992 set was not released until 2009 as a DVD for their reissue of their debut album, Ten. This has been referred to as a breakout moment for the band during a time when the Seattle grunge scene was in high demand. Intense performances of the songs "Black" and "Porch" highlight this show with the latter featuring lead singer Eddie Vedder writing PRO CHOICE on his arm with a Sharpie.
- On April 27, 1992, Seattle-based heavy metal band Queensrÿche filmed their Unplugged performance, playing such songs as "Silent Lucidity", "The Lady Wore Black", "I Will Remember", "The Killing Words", and a cover of "Scarborough Fair".
- On July 3, 1992, Annie Lennox played an Unplugged show at the Montreux Jazz Festival. Nine of the twelve songs performed were released as part of the single series "Cold. Colder. Coldest." Each CD featured the studio version of Lennox's "Cold" as well as three songs from the MTV Unplugged show. Cold consisting of songs from Diva, Colder songs Lennox has recorded with Eurythmics and Coldest cover versions of songs originally by Ike & Tina Turner, The Detroit Emeralds and The Beatles.

=== 1993–1994 ===
- On January 9, 1993, Swedish duo Roxette recorded the show at Stockholm Circus. During the show, they covered songs from other artists such as Aretha Franklin, Neil Young and The Byrds.
- In December 1992, Neil Young attempted to record an episode at the Ed Sullivan Theater in New York but abandoned the performance after numerous false starts and disagreements with his backing band. Young eventually recorded a performance in February 1993 at Universal Studios in Los Angeles that was broadcast on MTV in March 1993 and released that June as his Gold selling Unplugged album.
- On April 20, 1993, Midnight Oil recorded an episode at Sony Music Studios in New York City. They recorded a 17-song set which included many of their hits and an encore cover of "We Gotta Get Out of This Place" originally recorded by Eric Burdon and the Animals. The set was broadcast edited in the US while Australia received a longer 9-song set. The full set was released on DVD in 2017. "One Country" was attempted in their session but was not finished and not released.
- On April 21, 1993, Soul Asylum performed their set two months before the release of "Runaway Train" music video. Lulu was the special guest who sang "To Sir With Love" in a duet with Dave Pirner, who was introduced to actress Winona Ryder backstage and they dated for the next three years.
- The MTV Unplugged special featuring Uptown Records artists, known as "Uptown Unplugged," aired on May 31, 1993 in the United States. It was taped at Universal Studios in Los Angeles and featured performances by Jodeci, Mary J. Blige, Father MC, Heavy D & The Boys, and Christopher Williams. The set of Jodeci ended with Stevie Wonder's "Lately". The group's version of the song was later released as a promotional single, claiming the number one spot on the US Billboard Hot R&B/Hip-Hop Singles & Tracks chart as the group's fourth number one R&B hit.
- Rod Stewart performed a session with Ronnie Wood on February 5, 1993, at Universal Studios, Los Angeles. Selections from this recording aired in May and were released on the album Unplugged...and Seated.
- On November 17, 1993, British rock group Duran Duran filmed their acoustic performance after a brief hiatus from their world tour due to lead singer Simon Le Bon's vocal straining after 11 months on the road. They played many of their classic hits as well as their 1990 single "Serious".
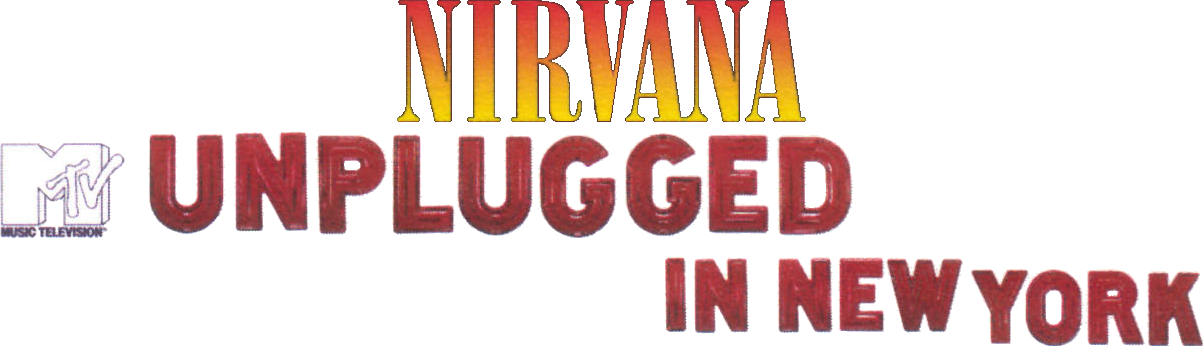
- The logo for Nirvana's MTV Unplugged in New York
  Nirvana's performance on Unplugged was one of the last televised performances by Kurt Cobain, recorded on November 18, 1993, about five months before Cobain's death. Nirvana's set list consisted of some of their lesser known originals, and covers of songs by the Meat Puppets, Lead Belly, David Bowie and The Vaselines. The only real "hits" played during this performance were "Come as You Are", "Polly" and "All Apologies". This contrasts with other Unplugged performances, where artists largely perform their hit singles and other original material. Nirvana's performance was released a year later as MTV Unplugged in New York, about seven months after Cobain's death. It sold over 5 million copies and won Best Alternative Music Performance at the 38th Grammy Awards in 1996. It was also released on DVD in 2007.
- In 1993, Stone Temple Pilots filmed a 26-minute episode of MTV Unplugged, where they debuted the song "Big Empty" prior to the release of their 1994 album Purple. Other songs included "Creep", "Plush", and a unique acoustic rendition of "Wicked Garden". This performance was never released as an official standalone album release, although it does appear on the deluxe reissue of Core.
- Bruce Springsteen's 1993 performance included a twist in where most of his set was performed with amplified instruments. The show was released later on album and video as In Concert/MTV Plugged.
- 10,000 Maniacs performed their last televised concert with vocalist Natalie Merchant in 1993. The performance was released as the album MTV Unplugged. Their cover of the Patti Smith/Bruce Springsteen song "Because the Night" was released as a single. David Byrne was a guest vocalist.
- Bob Dylan recorded an Unplugged concert in 1994 over two nights that was combined into one show.
- The Eagles' 1994 acoustic reunion concert was broadcast on MTV as a one-off special called Hell Freezes Over. Nevertheless, the show, which was produced by the Unplugged team, is generally regarded as part of the MTV Unplugged series. The concert was released on CD (with four new studio tracks), VHS, and DVD, as Hell Freezes Over.
- On September 29, 1994, Los Fabulosos Cadillacs performed the first Latin/Spanish show at the MTV Miami studios. The playlist included covers of The Clash's "The Guns of Brixton" and reggae artist Keith & Tex's "Stop That Train".
- On October 14, 1994 (recorded in August 1994), the long-awaited reunion between Jimmy Page and Robert Plant occurred on a 90-minute "UnLedded" project, recorded in Morocco, Wales, and London, which rated highly on network television. It was not a reunion of Led Zeppelin, however, as former bassist and keyboardist John Paul Jones was not present. In fact, Jones was not even told about the reunion by his former bandmates. In addition to acoustic numbers, the album features a reworking of Led Zeppelin classics, along with four Middle Eastern- and Moroccan-influenced songs: "City Don't Cry," "Yallah" (or "The Truth Explodes"), "Wonderful One," and "Wah Wah". The resulting album, No Quarter: Jimmy Page and Robert Plant Unledded, was certified Platinum in the US and elsewhere.
- In 1994, Lenny Kravitz performed with his band on MTV Unplugged along with an orchestra.
- On October 21, 1994, Phil Collins Unplugged aired. Because of his diminishing popularity in the US it only aired in Europe.
- In 1994, a compilation album was released called The Unplugged Collection, Volume One.
- On September 1, 1994, at the Fountain Studios in London, Icelandic artist Björk recorded her MTV Unplugged special. She was accompanied by the band that played on her Debut tour, plus other musicians such as Corky Hale, Oliver Lake and Evelyn Glennie. Her performance aired on November 7, 1994. It was released on DVD in 2002 in the MTV Unplugged / Live video, and in audio form, originally as part of her Live Box compilation and then separately as Debut Live in 2004.

=== 1995–1999 ===
- On February 14, 1995, Hole recorded a live acoustic performance in front of an audience at the Brooklyn Academy of Music in New York City. Along with a string ensemble, Courtney Love, Eric Erlandson, Patty Schemel and Melissa Auf der Maur played 13 songs, a mix of hits off Live Through This, new material, covers by Duran Duran and Donovan, and the unreleased Nirvana track "You Know You're Right." The show first aired on April 18, 1995.
- On February 14, 1995, the Cranberries recorded a nine song-set accompanied by Electra Strings quartet, at the Brooklyn Academy of Music. The performance aired on April 18, 1995.
- On February 15, 1995, Live performed a nine-song set of their own material and a cover of Vic Chesnutt's "Supernatural".
- On May 4, 1995, Argentine musician Charly Garcia appeared at the MTV studios, bringing together his "Cassandra Lange" band for his third live album. Garcia included some of his classics and the result was issued as a live album, after Garcia re-recorded some of the material.
- On August 9, 1995, Kiss performed on an episode that would lead to the reunion of the original members. Paul Stanley and Gene Simmons invited former members Peter Criss and Ace Frehley to participate in the show. Fan reaction was so positive that the following year the original Kiss lineup officially reunited, together for the first time since 1979. The recording of the episode was released as the album Kiss Unplugged.
- On August 10, 1995, Chris Isaak performed a set on an episode, including his hit song "Wicked Game".
- On September 14, 1995, Chilean band Los Tres held an MTV Unplugged performance in Miami Beach, Florida. It was attended by Antonio Restucci and Cuti Aste, two Chilean musician friends of the band. This was the first unplugged album of a Chilean group for MTV and (according to MTV technicians) is the only truly unplugged concert that has been performed at some distance from each instrument as only the dynamic range of analog microphones were used. The resulting album, MTV Unplugged, went quadruple platinum and was the most popular album in Chile in 1995. The recording was made just a few months after the death of Chilean musician Roberto Parra, an important inspiration for the band. Because of this, the group dedicated the concert and album to the memory of "Uncle Robert" and played two cuecas, "El arrepentido" and "La vida que yo he pasado", as well as the popular foxtrot "Quien es la que viene alli". The latter song became a success of great proportions, possibly the most important in the career of the band. The new song on the album, "traje desastre", was also touted as a single from the album, and featured a video directed by Chilean film director German Bobe. The album contains 15 songs, of which 12 are their own compositions and three of Roberto Parra.
- On March 12, 1996, Soda Stereo was invited to Miami to record a session for MTV Unplugged. After a few refusals by the band, they convinced the network to accept an offer where the band would play plugged in, but with modifications such as orchestration including new arrangements of some of their classic songs. The result was an eclectic mix of music, some electric, some acoustic, but all bearing Gustavo Cerati's signature style. A highlight of the album was a soaring rendition of "En la Ciudad de la Furia," where the chorus was sung by Andrea Echeverri of the Colombian rock band Aterciopelados. The recording of the performance was partially released on the album Comfort y Música Para Volar (Comfort and Music to Fly By) and in its entirety on a new version of Comfort in 2007. The album contained four new tracks from the recording sessions as well as an interactive CD-ROM with pictures and videos from the show.
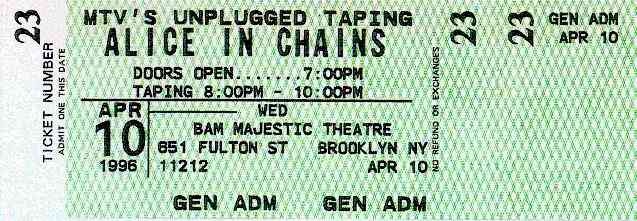
- An admissions ticket for the April 10, 1996 recording of Alice in Chains' Unplugged in Brooklyn, New York
  On April 10, 1996, Alice in Chains gave their first performance in three years and one of their last concerts as a group for nine years. During the show, lead singer Layne Staley looked visibly weak due to his ongoing drug addictions, but was able to deliver a strong performance.
- Oasis were due to tape the show at the Royal Festival Hall on August 23, 1996, when lead singer Liam Gallagher pulled out at the last minute, citing a sore throat. The band performed despite this, with songwriter and guitarist Noel Gallagher handling the vocals, earning much critical praise. Liam watched the performance and heckled the group from a balcony. Their performance of "Round Are Way" later appeared on the 20th anniversary edition of their album (What's the Story) Morning Glory?
- In 1996, pop artist George Michael gave an Unplugged performance for a crowd of 200-300 people. He performed a few select tracks from his album Older and a few from his earlier recordings (including one from his Wham! days). He also did a cover of "I Can't Make You Love Me". The performance was critically acclaimed and was the last performance his mother saw, as she died the following year.
- In 1997, neo-soul singer Maxwell performed Kate Bush's "This Woman's Work" and Nine Inch Nails' "Closer" on the show to high acclaim.
- On September 26, 1997, Bryan Adams performed on Unplugged at the Hammerstein Ballroom in New York City and released an album of the performance. Adams was joined by Irish piper Davy Spillane and Michael Kamen (who wrote orchestrations for many of the songs and brought students from the Juilliard School to play them). Three new songs were included: "Back To You", "When You Love Someone" and "A Little Love". The song "If Ya Wanna Be Bad – Ya Gotta Be Good" made its debut on the album. The record sold over 5 million units worldwide.
- On March 23, 1999, Mexican rock group Maná recorded their MTV Unplugged performance at MTV's Miami studios. The concert was released on CD and DVD on June 22, 1999 in the Americas and Spain. It includes exclusive covers of the José Alfredo Jiménez song "Te Solte La Rienda", the Rubén Blades song "Desapariciones", and "Se Me Olvidó Otra Vez" by Juan Gabriel. The recording received a nomination for a Grammy Award for Best Latin Pop Album.
- In 1997, Argentine musician Luis Alberto Spinetta performed on MTV Unplugged with his band Los Socios del Desierto (with some invited musicians like Juan "Mono" Fontana on keyboard). This performance was atypical as Spinetta performed longer that an hour, playing seven new songs and mostly ignoring his past hits. This was released as Estrelicia MTV Unplugged later that year.
- On September 8, 1999, Canadian singer-songwriter Alanis Morissette performed on MTV Unplugged, later released in November as Alanis Unplugged. Twelve tracks were included on the album, but Morissette performed several others, including "Baba", "Thank U" (both from 1998's Supposed Former Infatuation Junkie) and "Your House" (the hidden track on 1995's Jagged Little Pill). In addition to material from Morissette's first two US albums, MTV Unplugged featured performances of "No Pressure over Cappuccino" and "Princes Familiar", two previously unreleased songs from her tours, a cover of The Police song "King of Pain", and "These R the Thoughts", a previously released B-side.
- Performed In August 1999 in New York City and released in February 2000, Colombian singer-songwriter Shakira's MTV Unplugged release was particularly successful in introducing Shakira into the English-speaking world; it charted at number one in the Billboard Latin Charts and became the first Latin Unplugged album to win a Grammy Award.
- In October 1999, Irish band The Corrs performed live on MTV Unplugged (recorded in Wicklow, Ireland). The concert was recorded and published an album in November 1999.

=== 2000–2009 ===
The MTV Unplugged 2.0 logo used for the show's return in the 2000s

Since 2000, the Unplugged format has been revived on a number of occasions for specials.

- In 2001, Spanish singer Alejandro Sanz performed on MTV Unplugged and released an album of the performance on November 20, 2001.
- In 2001, Hikaru Utada became the youngest singer and the third Japanese (the first and second being Chage and Aska) to be featured on MTV Unplugged.
- Lauryn Hill unveiled her much-anticipated new material on a 2002 MTV Unplugged special and later released it on the album MTV Unplugged No. 2.0. It had been three years since the release of Hill's The Miseducation of Lauryn Hill. Hill appeared with her hair cut off and performed in a stripped-down, minimalist style. Her set included her playing an acoustic guitar, spoken word segments, and occasionally breaking down in tears.
- American rock band Staind performed on MTV Unplugged on July 16, 2001, and released a DVD of the performance including songs not included in the original MTV broadcast. Cold guitarist Terry Balsamo also appears as a guest performer. The DVD was certified Gold in 2003, selling over 500,000 copies. The performance has yet to be released on CD, digital markets, or streaming platforms.
- Chilean rock band La Ley performed on MTV Unplugged in 2001, and released an album of the performance, which went on to win a Grammy award. This is the band's best selling album. After the album's success, La Ley was finally able to internationalize themselves and they make their way to foreign countries such as the United States. The album contains older songs from previous albums plus three new songs.
- Jay-Z recorded a performance of Unplugged on November 18, 2001, with The Roots serving as his backing band. The subsequent album sold over 600,000 copies and made it to No. 20 on the Billboard 200 chart.
- Dashboard Confessional recorded an Unplugged show in New York in 2002, and became the first band without a platinum record to do so. The band released the show as MTV Unplugged 2.0 on CD and DVD.
- MTV Unplugged was first introduced in Italy on June 16, 2005, with Italian singer Giorgia's own successful Unplugged experiment.
- Queens of the Stone Age participated in their first Unplugged special in Berlin in June 2005 and performed a number of tracks from their album Lullabies to Paralyze.
- Alicia Keys' Unplugged special aired on MTV on September 23, 2005. It was the first Unplugged in nearly three years, and special guests for Keys' performance included Mos Def, Common, Damian Marley and Maroon 5's Adam Levine. The show was released on CD and DVD in October 2005. The album debuted at No. 1 (see Unplugged).
- On August 17, 2006, Puerto Rican singer Ricky Martin performed on MTV Unplugged and released the album of the performance on November 7, 2006 as MTV Unplugged. The album reached number 1 of the Billboard Latin Charts, selling more than 2 million copies worldwide and winning several awards, including two Latin Grammy.
- On December 9, 2006, Korn performed on Unplugged with guests Amy Lee, Robert Smith, and Simon Gallup (the former of Evanescence and the latter duo of The Cure) on some of their well-known songs, along with others. The performance was released on a CD entitled MTV Unplugged: Korn on March 6, 2007, where it debuted on the U.S. Billboard 200 at #9.
- In 2009, Nagase Tomoya (from the rock/pop band Tokio) performed on MTV Unplugged as the sixth Japanese performer to hold a performance on the program after artists such as Chage and Aska and Hikaru Utada.
- During the summer of 2009, MTV.com officially revived the Unplugged franchise with a six episode season produced and directed by Matthew C. Mills of Spacestation. This particular season won an Emmy Award for Best New Approach, was nominated for another Emmy (Sound Recording), and was a Webby Award Honoree. Artists in this incarnation were Adele, Silversun Pickups, All Time Low, Paramore, Vampire Weekend and Katy Perry. Both Katy Perry and All Time Low released albums of their performances. The shows debuted on unplugged.mtv.com while single song excerpts appear on MTV and Palladia/MTV Live in video rotation. Adele Unplugged premiered on Palladia June 26 and Silversun Pickups August 1.

=== 2010–2019 ===
- An MTV Unplugged performance featuring German rapper Sido was recorded on January 28, 2010 in Berlin.
- MTV revived the show on March 10, 2010 with Adam Lambert.
- In 2010, American musician B.o.B recorded an Unplugged performance.
- In October 2010, Mexican rock band Panda recorded their MTV Unplugged performance in Mexico City. It aired on November 23, 2010.
- In March 2011, K-os performed an MTV Unplugged in Toronto that was recorded for a future album and DVD.
- On March 4, 2011, an MTV Unplugged performance featuring Lykke Li debuted on MTV.com.
- In May 2011, Los Tigres del Norte MTV Unplugged was aired on MTV Tr3s. They became the first Regional Mexican group to ever record an Unplugged.
- On May 13, 2011, Thirty Seconds to Mars recorded an Unplugged performance at Sony Music Studios in New York City. The band's set list consisted of songs extracted from their third studio album, This Is War (2009) and cover versions of songs by U2 and The Police. The performance was later released as a four-track extended play with a video accompaniment package. The Unplugged version of "Hurricane" won the MTV Award for Best Live Performance.
- On June 12, 2011, Lil Wayne performed acoustic versions of his catalog, being the first rapper to have a televised Unplugged since 2001, when Jay-Z recorded with The Roots. The special was labeled MTV2 Presents: Lil Wayne Unplugged, premiering on MTV2, MTV and MTV.com.
- In April 2012, Florence and the Machine starred in an MTV Unplugged special.
- In May 2012, 9mm Parabellum Bullet performed at Billboard Live in Tokyo. A DVD was released with unbroadcasted songs.
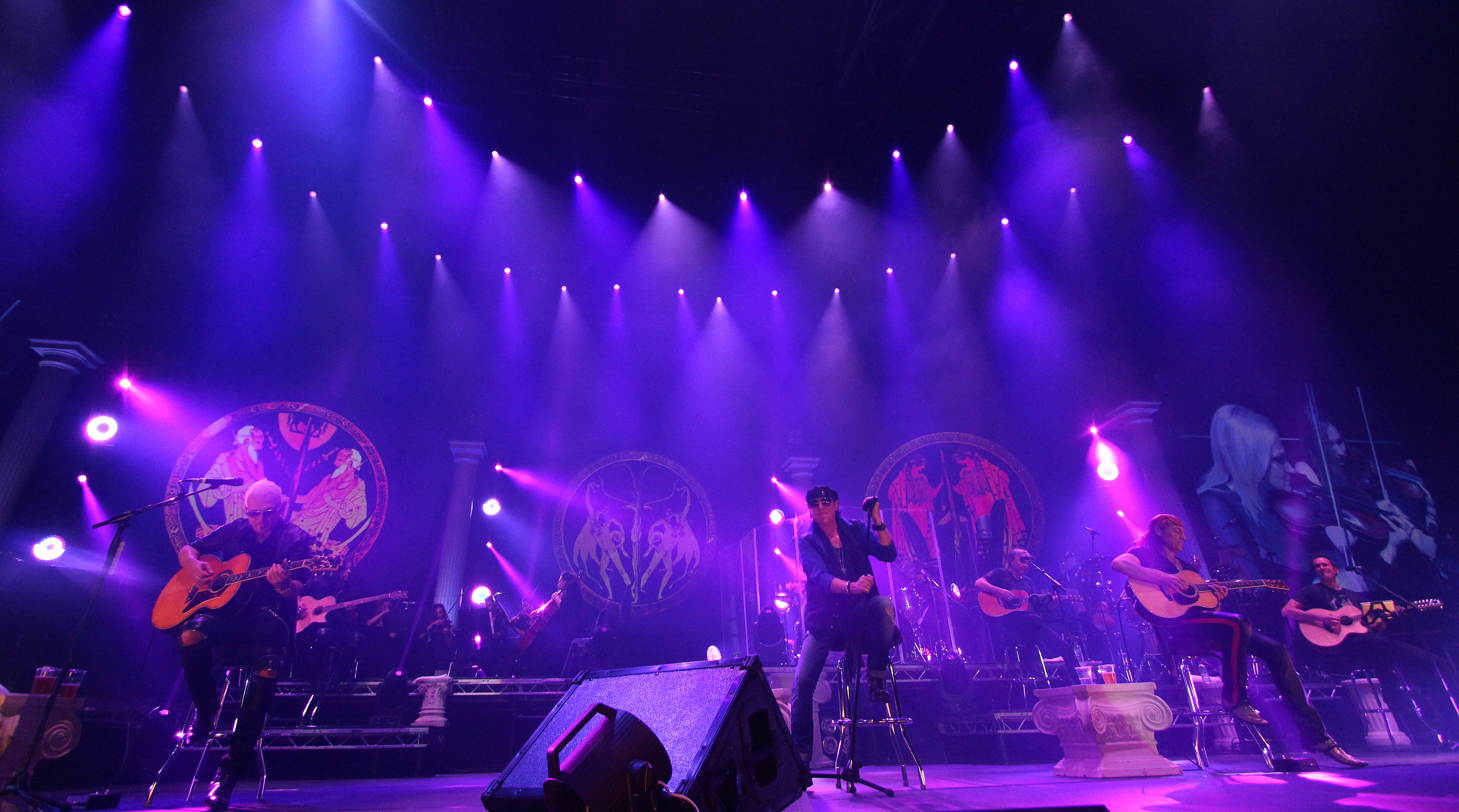
- Scorpions performing an Unplugged set in Athens, Greece
  In September 2013, Scorpions performed and taped three nights in Athens, Greece for a future MTV Unplugged episode. The recordings were later released as the album MTV Unplugged – Live in Athens released in November of that year.
- On January 28, 2014, American actress and recording artist Miley Cyrus performed an Unplugged show in Los Angeles. The show aired the next day on MTV. Cyrus performed several songs from her album Bangerz. She also performed a duet with Madonna, performing a mash-up of "We Can't Stop" and "Don't Tell Me".
- On November 7, 2014, German reggae artist Gentleman released his album MTV Unplugged which included 28 songs featuring Ky-Mani Marley, Milky Chance, Shaggy, Christopher Martin and more. This was the first time MTV Unplugged had a reggae artist after 25 years.
- In 2015, Revolverheld recorded an MTV Unplugged album with guests Annett Louisan, Rea Garvey, Heinz Strunk, Das Bo, Marta Jandova, Mark Forster, Johannes Oerding, and Michael Van Diek.
- In 2015, Cro recorded the album de:MTV Unplugged: Cro with songs from his albums Melodie and Raop. He was the youngest artist to record a MTV Unplugged album.
- MTV Unplugged is a live album by the English alternative rock band Placebo. It was released on 27 November 2015 and was recorded on 19 August 2015 at The London Studios.
- In 2016, former MTV president Sean Atkins announced the show would return reimagined to the flagship network. In 2017, MTV announced the program would return on September 8, with Shawn Mendes performing in the season premiere.
- In 2017, Norwegian band a-ha recorded the MTV Unplugged – Summer Solstice album and DVD/Blu-ray. The album and DVD/Blu-ray were released on 6 October 2017. It was recorded live at the Harbour Hall at Ocean Sound Recordings in Giske, Norway on 22 and 23 June 2017. MTV had first approached a-ha 10 years earlier, but the band had put it off several times. The performance includes a selection of guest artists, including Lissie, Alison Moyet, Ian McCulloch and Ingrid Helene Håvik.
- On September 15, 2017, Bleachers recorded 11 tracks for MTV Unplugged. The album was released on November 11, 2017, and features additional vocals from Carly Rae Jepsen and Lorde.
- In April 2018, a SaMTV Unplugged was recorded on the ship MS Bleichen in Hamburg Harbor by German rapper Samy Deluxe.
- In 2018, MTV produced MTV Unplugged Melbourne, featuring weekly episodes filmed in Australia with local Australian artists including Courtney Barnett, Amy Shark, The Rubens and Gang of Youths to name a few.
- In 2017, Scottish rock band Biffy Clyro recorded an MTV Unplugged performance in London that aired in 2018.
- In 2019, MTV Unplugged recorded a special show in Warsaw featuring Polish artist Brodka. The show was recorded on February 19, 2019.
- In 2019, MTV Unplugged returned to the UK with an August 2019 performance by Liam Gallagher at Hull City Hall; it aired in September 2019. The performance was also later released on CD, vinyl and digital download on June 12, 2020 as MTV Unplugged (Live at Hull City Hall).

=== 2020–present ===
- In 2020, during the COVID-19 global pandemic, MTV launched MTV Unplugged at Home; the series featured 14 online episodes.
- On February 23, 2021, MTV released a performance by BTS, the first South Korean band to appear on Unplugged.
- On July 2, 2021, Tony Bennett and Lady Gaga gave a performance in front of an intimate studio audience in New York City. The recorded performance aired on MTV Unplugged on December 16, 2021.
- In 2021, British band Bastille recorded an MTV Unplugged performance in Porchester Hall.
- On June 9, 2022, American alternative rock duo Twenty One Pilots performed new versions of several songs (both old and new) on MTV Unplugged.
- In 2022, Polish band Lady Pank recorded an MTV Unplugged performance in Warsaw, which was released as a CD, vinyl, and video on the Player streaming platform.

== Performances using the "Unplugged" format ==
The rock band Tesla performed an all-acoustic live set on July 2, 1990 that was released under the title Five Man Acoustical Jam in November of that year, following the format established the previous year by MTV Unplugged.

MTV's sister channel VH1 airs VH1 Storytellers, interspersing mostly acoustic performances with the artists discussing the history, meaning and memories of the songs.

Bon Jovi performed unplugged in 2007 on CMT. The Police, Mary J. Blige, Kenny Chesney and John Mayer were scheduled to perform.

The fourth season of Canadian Idol featured an Unplugged night which was held at Toronto's Masonic Temple. This episode of Canadian Idol was a tribute to MTV in two ways: a direct tribute to the Unplugged format, and to celebrate the recent licensing of the new MTV Canada which was located in the Masonic Hall until 2012.

On July 30, 2020, Code Orange performed a livestreamed acoustic set on Twitch spoofing MTV Unplugged under the title of "MUDTV Mudbanger's Ball" during the COVID-19 pandemic. The band described it as "conceptually akin to classic MTV Unplugged performances, but with nightmarish digital twists and turns." The performance was later remastered and released on September 4, 2020, as their album Under the Skin.
