= Drop Everything =

Studio album by Lady Pank
- Released: 1 March 1985 (U.S.); 17 June 1985 (UK)
- Studio: Tonpress; Pollen Studio
- Genre: Rock
- Length: 38:16
- Label: MCA Records; Klub Płytowy Razem (Poland)

Lady Pank chronology
Ohyda (1984)	Drop Everything (1985)	O Dwóch Takich Co Ukradli Księżyc (1986)

Drop Everything is a 1985 album by Polish rock band Lady Pank. The record was the first and the only album the band recorded in English and was aimed at international markets, being released in United States, UK, Mexico, Brazil and Argentina. Drop Everything was also released in Poland through a Polish record company called Klub Płytowy Razem.

All song featured on the album were originally released in 1983 on the band's debut album Lady Pank. Drop Everything features original instrumental tracks from Lady Panks debut effort with the original vocal tracks replaced by a rerecorded English version.

A music video for "Minus Zero" was made. The video was shot in Jersey City, New Jersey and is the first music video by a Polish artist to ever appear on MTV.

== Track listing ==
All songs written by Jan Borysewicz, with original lyrics written by Andrzej Mogielnicki. English lyrics written/translated by Tom Wachtel

Side one
No.	Title	Length
1.	"Minus Zero" (Mniej niż zero)	3:54
2.	"Hustler" (Kryzysowa narzeczona)	3:56
3.	"Hero" (Zamki na piasku)	4:10
4.	"The Zoo That Has No Keeper" (Fabryka małp)	3:40
5.	"Be Good" (Vademecum skauta)	3:56
Total length:		19:46

Side two
No.	Title	Length
6.	"Do, Do" (Du, Du)	3:54
7.	"Someone's 'Round The Corner" (Pokręciło mi się w głowie)	3:58
8.	"Disturbance Of The Order" (Zakłócenie porządku) (Instrumental)	1:30
9.	"Stranger" (Wciąż bardziej obcy)	5:34
10.	"My Kilimanjaro" (Moje Kilimandżaro)	3:44
Total length:		18:40

== Personnel ==
- Jan Borysewicz — lead guitar, lead vocals on "Stranger"
- Janusz Panasewicz — lead vocals
- Edmund Stasiak — rhythm guitar, lead guitar on "Do, Do"
- Paweł Mścisławski — bass
- Jarosław Szlagowski — drums
