= El Último Concierto =

1997 live album by Soda Stereo

- El Último Concierto A cover

Live album by Soda Stereo
- Released: December 16, 1997
- Recorded: 20 September 1997
- Genres: Latin rock; alternative rock; new wave; post-punk; hard rock; shoegaze; neo-psychedelia; experimental rock; electronic rock
- Length: 100:55
- Labels: BMG Argentina/Ariola, Sony Argentina
- Producers: Gustavo Cerati & Zeta Bosio

Soda Stereo chronology
Comfort y Música Para Volar (1996)	El Último Concierto (1997)	Me Verás Volver (2007)

El Último Concierto B cover

El Último Concierto

Video by Soda Stereo
- Released: 2005
- Recorded: 20 September 1997
- Genres: Latin rock; alternative rock; new wave; post-punk; hard rock; shoegaze; neo-psychedelia; experimental rock; electronic rock
- Length: 172 minutes
- Label: Sony
- Director: Alfredo Lois
- Producers: Sergio Diadizo, Daniel Kon

Soda Stereo chronology
Una Parte de la Euforia (2004)	El Último Concierto (2005)	Comfort y Música Para Volar (2007)

Professional ratings
Review scores
Source	Rating
AllMusic	4/5 stars

El Último Concierto (Spanish for The Last Concert) is a live album recorded by Argentine rock band Soda Stereo. The album was released in 1997 as two different albums, El Último Concierto A and El Último Concierto B. The album features live tracks, mostly taken from their concert on 20 September 1997 at the River Plate Stadium, Buenos Aires. It was the last concert by the band before their definitive break up. The DVD of the concert was released in 2005.

Some of the songs played are missing on both formats ("Sobredosis de TV" and "Juego de seducción"). The DVD is more thorough, featuring the two missing songs from the CDs, but excluding one ("Claroscuro").

== CD track listing ==
=== El Último Concierto A ===
1. En la Ciudad de la Furia (Cerati) – 6:38
2. El Rito (Cerati) – 7:05
3. Hombre al Agua (Cerati / Melero) – 6:29
4. (En) el Séptimo Día (Cerati) – 4:56
5. Canción Animal (Cerati / Melero) – 4:19
6. Trátame Suavemente (Melero) – 4:04
7. Paseando por Roma (Bosio / Cerati) – 3:42
8. Lo que Sangra (la Cúpula) (Cerati) – 5:17
9. Zoom (Cerati) – 3:33
10. Signos (Cerati) – 4:31
11. Ella usó mi cabeza como un revólver (Bosio / Cerati / Ficicchia) – 4:39

=== El Último Concierto B ===
1. Disco Eterno (Alberti / Cerati / Bosio) – 7:35
2. Planeador (Bosio / Cerati / Ficicchia) – 4:25
3. Luna Roja (Cerati) – 5:36
4. Té para 3 (Cerati) – 2:32
5. Cuando pase el temblor (Cerati) – 4:54
6. Claroscuro (Bosio / Cerati / Melero) – 5:36
7. Persiana Americana (Cerati / Daffunchio) – 4:43
8. Un Millón de Años Luz (Cerati) – 5:55
9. Primavera 0 (Cerati) – 4:25
10. Cae el sol (Cerati / Melero) – 4:50
11. De Música Ligera (Bosio / Cerati) – 4:53

== El Último Concierto C (DVD track listing) ==
All tracks are written by Gustavo Cerati, except where noted.

1. En la Ciudad de la Furia
2. El Rito
3. Hombre al Agua (Lyrics: Cerati-Melero)
4. (En) El Séptimo Día
5. Canción Animal (Lyrics: Cerati-Melero)
6. Juego de Seducción
7. Paseando por Roma (Music: Cerati-Bosio-Alberti)
8. Lo que Sangra (la Cúpula)
9. Signos
10. Zoom
11. Ella usó mi cabeza como un revólver (Music: Cerati-Bosio-Alberti)
12. Disco Eterno (Music: Cerati-Bosio-Alberti)
13. Planeador (Music: Cerati-Bosio-Alberti)
14. Luna Roja (Music: Cerati-Bosio)
15. Te para Tres
16. Sobredosis de TV
17. Trátame Suavemente (Music and lyrics: Daniel Melero)
18. Cuando pase el temblor
19. Persiana Americana (Lyrics: Cerati-Daffunchio)
20. Un Millón de Años Luz
21. Primavera 0
22. Cae el Sol (Lyrics: Daniel Melero)
23. De Música Ligera (Music: Cerati-Bosio)

== Personnel ==
Soda Stereo

- Gustavo Cerati – lead guitar, lead vocals.
- Zeta Bosio – bass guitar, backing vocals.
- Charly Alberti – drums, percussion.

Additional personnel

- Richard Coleman – additional guitar.
- Alejandro Terán – additional guitar, viola, percussion, tenor saxophone.
- Daniel Sais – keyboards.
- Fabián Quintero – keyboards.
- Tweety Gonzalez – keyboards.
- Axel Krygier – keyboards, accordion, percussion, flute.
- Andrea Alvarez – percussion.

== Certifications ==
Region	Certification	Certified units/sales
Mexico (AMPROFON)	Platinum	250,000^{‡}
United States (RIAA)	Gold (Latin)	30,000^{‡}
^{‡} Sales+streaming figures based on certification alone.
