= Tacy sami =

Studio album by Lady Pank
- Released: 1988
- Genre: New wave, pop rock
- Length: 41:15; 45:25 (2007 bonus track)
- Label: Polskie Nagrania Muza

Lady Pank chronology
O dwóch takich, co ukradli księżyc cz. 2 (1988)	Tacy sami (1988)	Zawsze tam, gdzie ty (1990)

Tacy sami is a 1988 album by Polish rock band Lady Pank. It combines elements of heavy metal and synth-pop music. The album includes the hit song, "Tacy sami" meaning "The same" in English.

== Track listing ==
Side one
No.	Title	Length
1.	"Tacy Sami" (eng. The same)	4:23
2.	"Oglądamy Film" (eng. We're watching a film)	4:49
3.	"John Belushi"	4:02
4.	"Mała Wojna" (eng. Little war)	4:42
5.	"Giga-Giganci" (eng. Gia-giants)	4:37
Total length:		22:33

Side two
No.	Title	Length
6.	"To Co Mam" (eng. What I have)	4:13
7.	"Zostawcie Titanica" (eng. Leave the Titanic)	4:48
8.	"Ratuj Tylko Mnie" (eng. Rescue only me)	4:47
9.	"Martwy Postój" (eng. The dead stopover)	4:54
Total length:		18:42; 41:15

2007 CD reissue bonus track
No.	Title	Length
10.	"Zasypiam nad ranem" (eng. I fall asleep in the morning)	4:10
Total length:		45:25

== Personnel ==
- Jan Borysewicz - lead guitar, vocals
- Janusz Panasewicz - vocals
- Edmund Stasiak - rhythm guitar
- Paweł Mścisławski - bass guitar
- Wiesław Gola - drums (only track 5 and 8)
- Jerzy Suchocki - keyboards
- Rafał Paczkowski - keyboards, drum machine

Lyrics by:

- Grzegorz Ciechowski ("Oglądamy film", "Zostawcie Titanica", "Ratuj tylko mnie", "Zasypiam nad ranem")
- Zbigniew Hołdys ("John Belushi", "Mała wojna", "Giga-giganci")
- Jacek Skubikowski ("Tacy sami")
- Marek Dutkiewicz ("To co mam", "Martwy postój")
