= Ohyda =

Studio album by Lady Pank
- Released: 1984 (Poland)
- Genre: Pop rock
- Length: 38:05
- Label: Savitor

Lady Pank chronology
Lady Pank (1983)	Ohyda (1984)	Drop Everything (1985)

Ohyda is the second album released by Lady Pank in 1984, on the Savitor label.

== Track listing ==
Side one
No.	Title	Length
1.	"Zabij To" (eng. Kill it)	3:25
2.	"Tango Stulecia" (eng. Tango of the century)	5:00
3.	"Czas Na Mały Blues" (eng. Time for a little blues)	4:20
4.	"Rolling Son"	4:05
5.	"Zabij To Cz. II" (eng. Kill it pt. 2)	3:30
Total length:		20:10

Side two
No.	Title	Length
6.	"To Jest Tylko Rock And Roll" (eng. This is only rock and roll)	3:40
7.	"Hotelowy Kram" (eng. A hotel shebang)	3:45
8.	"A To Ohyda" (eng. It's a gross)	3:50
9.	"Swojski Brodłej" (eng. The Familiar Broadway)	4:00
10.	"Szakal Na Brodłeju" (eng. The Jackal on the Broadway)	2:30
Total length:		17:45

== Personnel ==
- Jan Borysewicz – guitar, vocals
- Janusz Panasewicz – vocals
- Edmund Stasiak – guitar
- Paweł Mścisławski – bass guitar
- Jarosław Szlagowski – drums

== Production ==
- Recording director – Sławomir Wesołowski
- Sound operator – Mariusz Zabrodzki
- Music – Jan Borysewicz
- Lyrics – Andrzej Mogielnicki
