= Video (band) =

Polish band

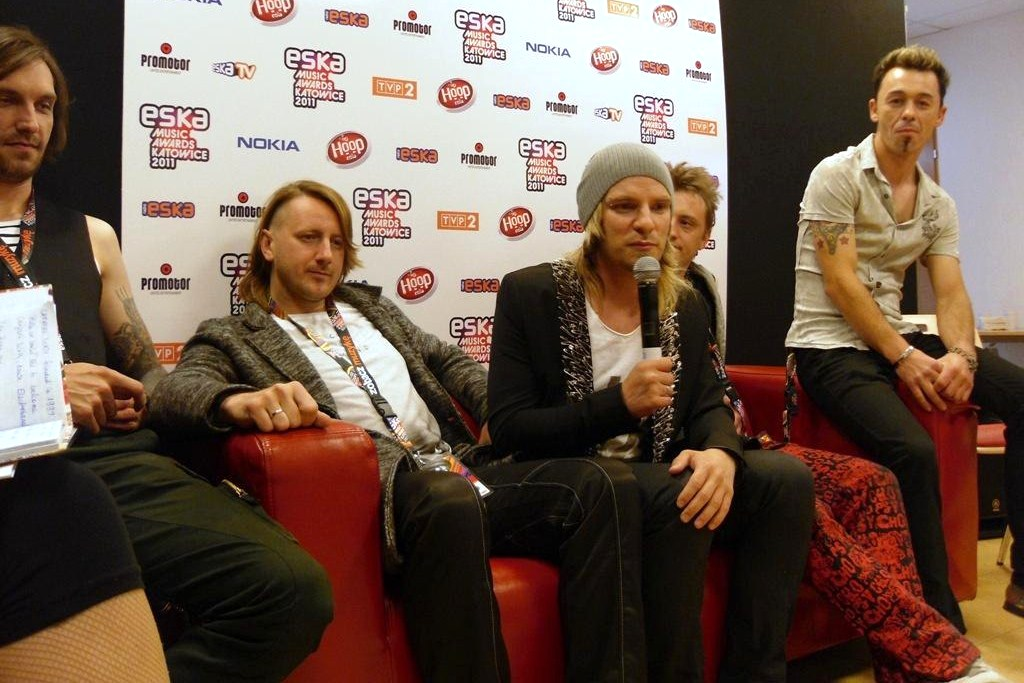
- Members of Video at the Eska Music Awards 2011

Background information
- Origin: Łódź, Poland
- Genres: Pop, pop rock, rock
- Years active: 2007–present
- Labels: Sony BMG, EMI Music Poland, Universal Music Poland
- Members: Wojciech Łuszczykiewicz; Daniel Tyszkiewicz; Bartek Szymański; Piotr Kowalewski; Paweł Stępień
- Past members: Tomasz Lubert; Piotr Siadul; Marek Błaszczyk; Emilian Waluchowski; Darek Światłowski
- Website: video.art.pl

ViVid is a Polish pop rock band formed in April 2007 by Maciej Durczak, Wojciech Łuszczykiewicz and Tomasz Lubert.

== History ==
In 2008 the band released its debut single, "Bella". The song was submitted to the Polish national selection for the Eurovision Song Contest 2008 (Piosenka dla Europy 2008), but did not qualify for the televised final. The track appeared on the group's debut studio album, Video gra, released in late March the same year.

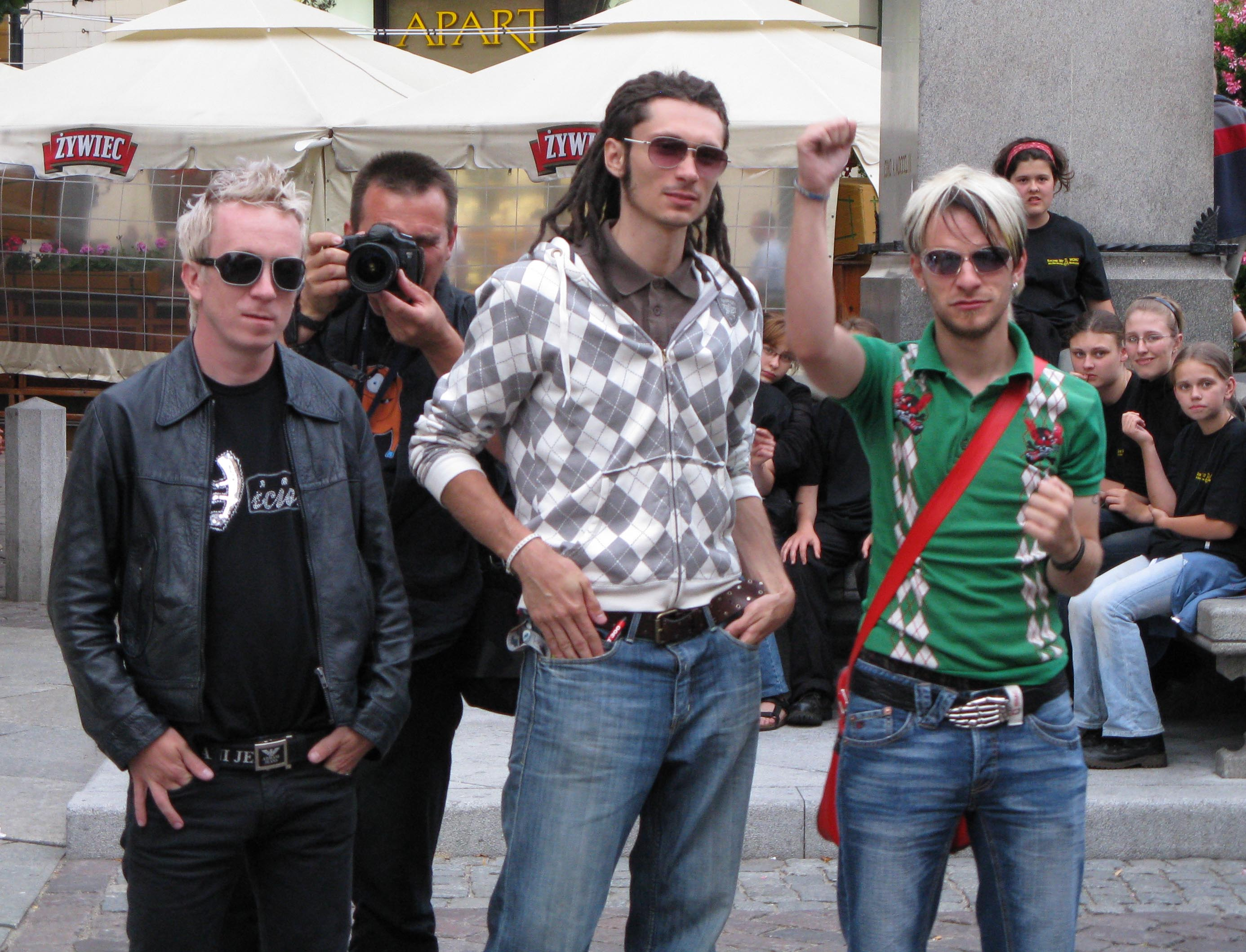
The band in 2008

In February 2009, co-founder Tomasz Lubert left the band.

In 2010, the group competed for the title of Polish Hit of the Summer 2010 at the Bydgoszcz Hit Festival, ultimately placing twelfth with 3.01% of the viewers’ votes.

The single "Papieros" ("Cigarette") reached no. 5 on the Polish Airplay Chart and no. 1 on the Polish Video Chart.

In 2011 the band won Group of the Year at the Eska Music Awards. One day earlier, its second studio album, Nie obchodzi nas rock, had been released.

On 7 February 2015, during the 6th "Gwiazdy Dobroczynności" Charity Ball, the band received the award in the Culture category for supporting the deaf and hard of hearing. Noticing barriers to cultural access, the group collaborated with Młodzi Migają Muzykę to produce a sign-language video for "Dobrze, że jesteś". The song previewed their third studio album, Doskonale wszystko jedno. Subsequent singles included "Kryzysowy" (featuring Jan Borysewicz), "Wszystko jedno", and "Ktoś nowy". The latter’s video depicted a same-sex wedding.

On 26 August 2016, Video performed "Ktoś nowy" at the Eska Music Awards 2016, where they received their third statuette for Best Band.

== Members ==
Current

- Wojciech Łuszczykiewicz ("Zee Zee Woo") – vocals, guitar (2007–present)
- Bartek Szymański ("Budyń") – guitar (2009–present)
- Piotr Kowalewski ("Funky Koval") – bass guitar (2009–present)
- Paweł Stępień – drums (2010–present)
- Daniel Tyszkiewicz ("Daniel Love") – acoustic guitar, tech (guitar 2008–2013; keyboards 2014–2019; 2022–present)

Former

- Tomasz Lubert ("Tom-X") – guitar (2007–2009)
- Piotr Siadul ("Shy Dull") – bass guitar (2007–2009)
- Marek Błaszczyk ("Marc Bee") – keyboards (2007–2009)
- Emilian Waluchowski ("Jamaica") – drums (2007–2010)
- Darek Światłowski ("Eduardo") – keyboards (2010)
- Marek Kisieliński ("Kisiel") – guitar, keyboards (2013–2015; 2016–2018; 2019–2021)

== Discography ==
=== Studio albums ===
Year	Title	Peak chart	Certification
2008	Video gra: Released: 24 March 2008; Label: Sony BMG	38	
2011	Nie obchodzi nas rock: Released: 31 May 2011; Label: EMI Music Poland	36	
2015	Doskonale wszystko jedno: Released: 21 August 2015; Label: Universal Music Poland	40	POL: Gold

=== Singles ===
Year	Single	POL Airplay	WiR	RMF FM Poplista	Certification	Album
2008	"Bella"	–	1	4		Video gra
2008	"Idę na plażę"	–	1	–		Video gra
2008	"Soft" (feat. Anna Wyszkoni)	–	2	2		Video gra
2009	"Będzie piekło"	–	10	3		Video gra
2009	"Fantastyczny lot"	–	1	2		Nie obchodzi nas rock
2010	"Szminki róż"	86	1	4		Nie obchodzi nas rock
2011	"Papieros"	3	1	2		Nie obchodzi nas rock
2011	"Środa czwartek"	57	2	1		Nie obchodzi nas rock
2013	"Kryzysowy" (feat. Jan Borysewicz)	–	5	–		Doskonale wszystko jedno
2014	"Dobrze, że jesteś"	–	–	–		Doskonale wszystko jedno
2015	"Wszystko jedno"	4	–	1	POL: Platinum	Doskonale wszystko jedno
2015	"Ktoś nowy"	8	–	1	POL: Platinum	Doskonale wszystko jedno
2016	"Alay 2016"	9	5	2		Doskonale wszystko jedno
"–" denotes a single that did not chart or was not released in that territory.

== Awards and nominations ==
Year	Ceremony	Category	Result
2008	TOPtrendy Festival	Trendy Artist	Nominated
2008	TOPtrendy Festival	Journalists’ Award	Won
2008	Sopot Festival	Audience Nightingale	Nominated
2008	Sopot Festival	Amber Nightingale	Nominated
2008	VIVA Comet 2008	Band of the Year	Nominated
2008	VIVA Comet 2008	Debut of the Year	Nominated
2008	Famka 2008	Discovery of the Year	Won
2010	Festiwal Piosenki Rosyjskiej	Golden Samovar	Nominated
2010	Bydgoszcz Hit Festival	Polish Hit of the Summer	12th place
2011	Eska Music Awards 2011	Group of the Year	Won
2011	OGAE Video Contest 2011 – Poland’s representative	Video ("Szminki róż")	Nominated
2012	VIVA Comet 2012	Band of the Year	Won
2012	VIVA Comet 2012	Album of the Year (Nie obchodzi nas rock)	Won
2012	VIVA Comet 2012	Hit of the Year	Nominated
2012	VIVA Comet 2012	Ringtone of the Year	Nominated
2012	VIVA Comet 2012	Artist of the Year (Wojciech Łuszczykiewicz only)	Won
2015	Eska Music Awards 2015	Best Band	Won
2016	Eska Music Awards 2016	Best Band	Won
