= Strach się bać =

Studio album by Lady Pank
- Released: 28 May 2007
- Genre: Rock
- Length: 39:13
- Label: Sony BMG
- Producer: Jan Borysewicz

Lady Pank chronology
Teraz (2004)	Strach się bać (2007)	Maraton (2011)

Strach się bać is an album released on 28 May 2007 by Polish rock band Lady Pank.

== Track listing ==
No.	Title	Length
1.	"Strach Się Bać" (eng. Fear to fear)	4:06
2.	"Wenus, Mars" (eng. Venus, Mars)	4:20
3.	"Jeśli Coś Tam Kochasz" (eng. If you love something)	4:08
4.	"Wspinaczka, Czyli Historia Pewnej Rewolucji" (eng. Climbing, or the story of a certain revolution)	4:45
5.	"Leprechaun"	2:53
6.	"Naprawdę Piękny Dzień" (eng. A truly beautiful day)	3:42
7.	"Pole Minowe" (eng. Minefield)	3:39
8.	"Dobra Konstelacja" (eng. Good constellation)	4:23
9.	"Wielki Supermarket" (eng. The big supermarket)	4:03
10.	"Nie Mam Nic, Prócz Ciebie" (eng. I have nothing except you)	3:22

== Musicians ==
=== Lady Pank ===
- Jan Borysewicz – guitar, backing vocals
- Janusz Panasewicz – lead vocals
- Krzysztof Kieliszkiewicz – bass
- Kuba Jabłoński – drums

=== Others ===
- Wojtek Olszak – keyboards (some tracks)
- Michał Sitarski – rhythm guitar (some tracks)
- Mariusz Georgia Pieczara – backing vocals (some tracks)
