= Jim Burns (television producer) =

American television producer (1952–2017)

James Burns (c. 1952 – December 26, 2017) was an American television producer and writer who co-created MTV Unplugged with Robert Small in 1989.

Unplugged, which originally aired on MTV from 1989 to 1999, featured well-known musicians performing acoustic versions of their songs. The show, which was also produced by Burns and Small, earned three Primetime Emmy Awards during its initial ten-year run. Artists appearing on the series included Nirvana, Mariah Carey, Eric Clapton, LL Cool J, and 10,000 Maniacs.

In 1989, Burns and television producer Robert Small joined together to co-create and produce MTV Unplugged, a new series featuring artists performing acoustic, stripped down versions of their songs. According to Robert Small, Burns believed that a show like Unplugged would create another venue for reaching audiences besides music videos, which were highly popular at the time. Small told the New York Post that Burns thought, "How can we create another avenue for artists?....It allowed for artists to show another side, for instance, a lot of hip-hop artists had the chance to be more lyrical and poetic."

MTV Unplugged debuted on MTV on November 26, 1989. The first season featured Elton John, Aerosmith, and Stevie Ray Vaughan. By the early 1990s, the show, helmed by Burns and Small, became a bonafide television and music industry hit.

Since leaving the Unplugged series, Burns had largely switched from television production to theater. He also worked as an executive producer and writer during his decades-long career.

Burns was struck by a taxi cab while crossing the corner of 87th Street and Fifth Avenue with his dog, on the Upper East Side on Saturday, December 23, 2017. He lived in the area. He suffered severe head injuries and was taken to New York Presbyterian-Weill Cornell Medical Center in critical condition. Burns died from his injuries at NewYork–Presbyterian Hospital in New York City hospital on Tuesday, December 26, 2017, at the age of 65.

Following Burns's death, MTV released a statement reading, "MTV was deeply saddened to learn of Jim Burns’s passing. As co-creator of the beloved 'Unplugged' franchise, his groundbreaking work continues to resonate with audiences around the world. Our thoughts and prayers go out to his family and loved ones." Robert Small, Burns's collaborator on Unplugged, also paid tribute, saying: "He was a terrific human being. He could make fun of people without making them feel bad. He just had a knack for making people happy."

In September 2017, just months before Burns's death, MTV Unplugged returned to television with new performances Shawn Mendes, Bleachers, and A-ha.
