= Rex Mix =

Remix album by Soda Stereo
- Released: November 29, 1991
- Genre: Alternative rock
- Length: 41:17
- Label: Sony Music Argentina/Columbia

Soda Stereo chronology
Canción Animal (1990)	Rex Mix (1991)	Dynamo (1992)

Singles from Rex Mix
- 1. "No necesito verte (Para saberlo)" Released: 1991

Rex Mix is an EP remix recorded by Argentine rock band Soda Stereo. It was their second effort EP and was released by Sony Music in 1991. The EP contains remixes and new arrangements of previous songs, two songs recorded live at Gran Rex Theatre in Buenos Aires (Hombre al agua, and No Existes), and one new track: No necesito verte (para saberlo). Daniel Melero, then a frequent collaborator of the band, played an important role in this EP, doing remixes and bringing new concepts to the band.

== Track listing ==
1. Hombre Al Agua (Cerati – Melero)
2. No Existes (Cerati)
3. En Camino – Viva la Patria Mix (Cerati – De Sebastian – Ficicchia)
4. No Necesito Verte (Para Saberlo) (Cerati – Melero) (I Don't Need To See You [To Know It])
5. No Necesito Verte (Para Saberlo) – Krupa Mix
6. En Camino – Veranek Mix
7. No Necesito Verte (Para Saberlo) – Candombe Mix

Track listing was different in all 3 formats (12", cassette and CD), with four songs on the 12" and six on tape. All seven tracks were included on the CD.

It was the last Soda Stereo record to be commercially released on vinyl in Argentina. Any Argentinian Soda vinyl releases after this one were pressed in minimal quantities as promos.

== Personnel ==
Soda Stereo

- Gustavo Cerati: lead vocals, guitar, keyboards and programming
- Zeta Bosio: bass and backing vocals
- Charly Alberti: drums and percussion

Additional personnel

- Tweety González: keyboards and acoustic guitar
- Daniel Melero: keyboards and chorus, voice in No Necesito Verte (Para Saberlo)
- Andrea Álvarez: percussion, chorus en Hombre Al Agua
- Produced by Gustavo Cerati & Zeta Bosio
