= Robert Small (producer) =

American producer

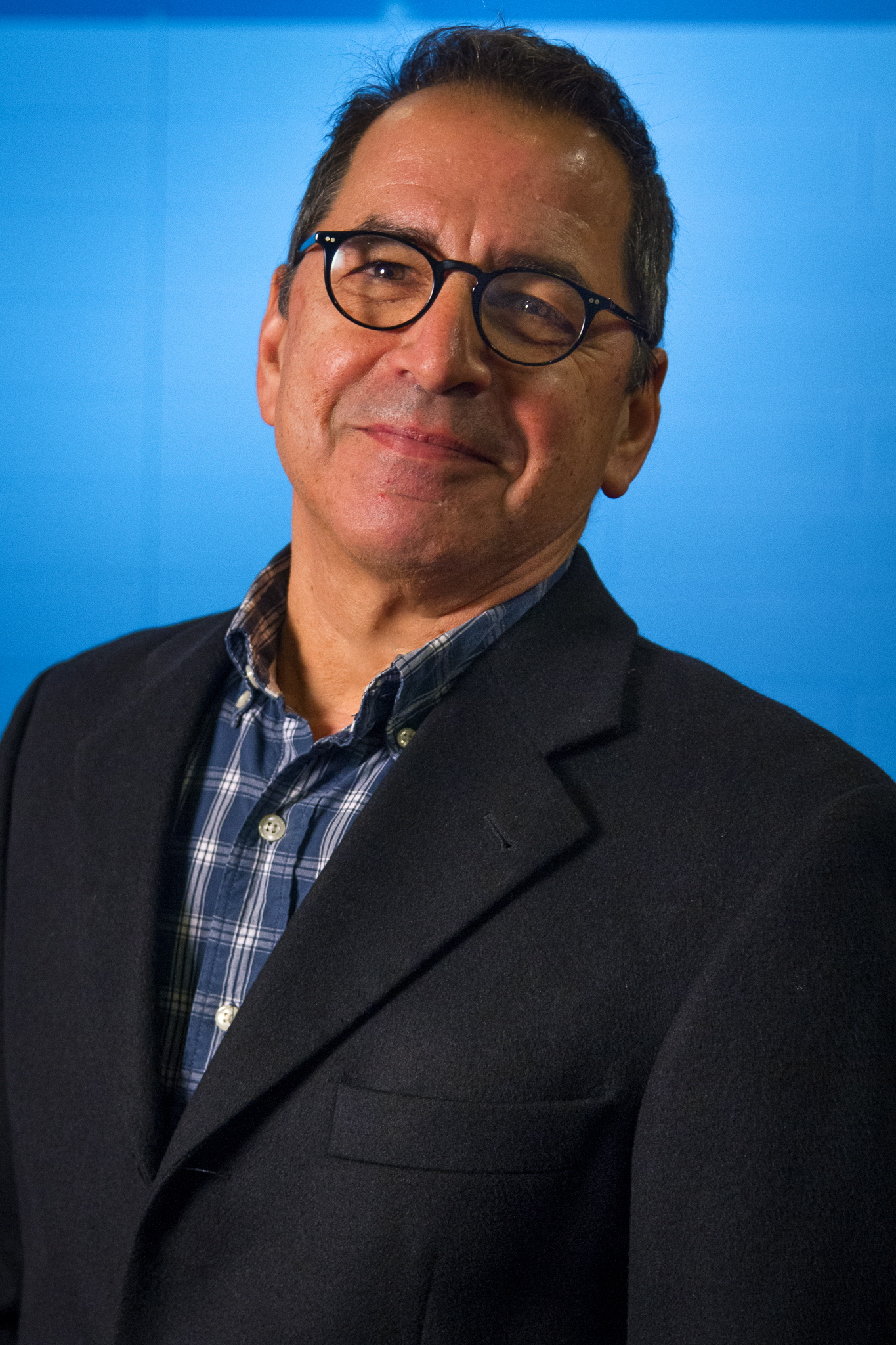
Robert Small, 2014

Robert Small is an American television, film and event producer who co-created MTV Unplugged with Jim Burns in 1989. He is the president and executive producer of RSE, Robert Small Entertainment, a media production company based in New York City. In 2013 Small began developing his new company, Small Industries, to focus on digital content creation and special projects exploring virtual reality, augmented reality and holographic entertainment.

== Career ==
In 1989, Small and then partner Jim Burns co-created the music series MTV Unplugged, which they then executive produced. He was an executive producer for the Pulp Comics series for Comedy Central, which integrated short films and standup material in the same half hour format. It ran from 1996 to 2000. Pulp Comics featured artists such as Louis C.K., Margaret Cho and Dave Attell. RSE also produced specials for HBO with Denis Leary and others in addition to A&E television worldwide.

Small is also credited as an executive producer on projects including MTV's The Spoken Word, AETN's Bio series, TV Land's Top Ten, and VH1's Hard Rock Live. In the summer of 2009, Small teamed up with Worldwide Biggies as an executive producer for the First Annual Worldwide Fido Awards for Nick at Nite. RSE continues its work in comedy, music, biographies and documentary production.

In 2009, Small wrote and directed his first independent documentary feature, Something Out of Nothing, which discusses the world of urban theater. In 2010 it was featured at HBO's Urban World Film Festival, DeadCENTER Film Festival, Black Soil Film Festival, ITVFest (Independent Television Festival), Texas Black Film Festival and the San Francisco Black Film Festival. He has directed the feature-length documentaries and television specials Back from Hell: A Tribute to Sam Kinison (2010) and I Ain't Scared of You: A Tribute to Bernie Mac (2012).

In 2013, Small became the producer of the Woodstock Comedy Festival, an annual three-day charity event featuring films, stand-up performances, panels and discussion about comedy past and present. Small is the director of The Macaulay Honors College New Media Lab in New York City, part of City University of New York. The Macaulay Honors College is CUNY's honors program.

== Awards and honors ==
For his work on MTV Unplugged, Small won the Peabody Award, and was nominated for Emmy Awards in 1994, 1995 and 1996.

He has also won 12 Telly Awards, ASCAP's Deems Taylor Award and 11 International Film Television Awards for various projects. He received the MTV Video Music Award.
