= Primavera 0 =

Song by Soda Stereo

Single by Soda Stereo

from the album Dynamo
- Language: Spanish
- English title: Spring 0
- Released: September 14, 1992
- Recorded: 1992
- Studio: Estudios Supersónico, Buenos Aires
- Genre: Shoegaze
- Length: 3:36
- Label: Sony
- Songwriter: Gustavo Cerati
- Producers: Gustavo Cerati, Zeta Bosio

"Primavera 0" is a song by Soda Stereo written by Gustavo Cerati and released on September 14, 1992, as the lead single from their sixth studio album, Dynamo. The song is a key example of the shoegaze sound on the album, a dramatic departure from the band's previous alternative rock-oriented album, Canción Animal.

== Composition and recording ==
"Primavera 0" was one of two tracks on the album composed by Cerati before the band returned to Buenos Aires to record the album. In an interview with El Musiquero, Cerati described the song as having a "circular" feel and a complex chord structure. He stated that it was the most complicated track in terms of song structure that the band had written up to that point.

== Reception and legacy ==
Upon its release, "Primavera 0" achieved significant radio success. Chilean newspaper La Tercera reported that the song was one of the five most requested on radio stations for several weeks in 1992. In a 2014 interview, Cerati described the song as having "the circular idea that the whole album has," due to its influence on the sound of the tracks that were written after it during the album's writing sessions.
