= Zona de Promesas =

Remix album by Soda Stereo
- Released: 1993
- Genre: Alternative rock, electronic
- Label: Sony Music

Soda Stereo chronology
Dynamo (1992)	Zona de Promesas (1993)	Sueño Stereo (1995)

Singles from Zona de Promesas
- 1. "Zona de promesas" Released: 1993

Zona de Promesas: mixes 1984-1993 (Spanish for Zone of Promises) is an album recorded by Argentine rock band Soda Stereo. Their tenth album, it was released by Sony Music Entertainment in 1993. The album is composed of a series of remixes recorded by Soda Stereo between 1984 and 1993 and "Zona de promesas", a track left in the cutting room of the band's previous album, Dynamo. This was the last album released through the Sony label. It was certified Gold by the Argentine Chamber of Phonograms and Videograms Producers.

== Track listing ==
1. "Zona de Promesas" (Cerati) (Zone of Promises)
2. "Primavera 0 [Bonzo Mix]"
3. "En la Ciudad de la Furia [Dance Mix]"
4. "Nada Personal [Rémix]"
5. "Luna Roja [Soul Mix]"
6. "Cuando Pase el Temblor [Oíd Mortales Mix]"
7. "Mundo de Quimeras"
8. "No Necesito Verte (Para Saberlo) [Krupa Mix]"
9. "Sobredosis de TV [Rémix]"
10. "Lo Que Sangra (La Cúpula) [Versión Rémix]"

== Personnel ==
Soda Stereo

- Gustavo Cerati: vocals, guitar and programming
- Zeta Bosio: bass and backing vocals
- Charly Alberti: drums and percussion
