= Lady Pank (album) =

Studio album by Lady Pank
- Released: June 20, 1983
- Recorded: 1982 – early 1983
- Studios: Teatr Stu and Wawrzyszew
- Genres: Rock, new wave
- Length: 39:35 (LP); 64:16 (CD)
- Labels: Tonpress, Koch International, Starling S.A., Tomi, Andromeda, MTJ
- Producer: Sławomir Wesołowski

Lady Pank chronology
Lady Pank (1983)	Ohyda (1984)

Singles from Lady Pank
- 1. "Mniej niż zero" Released: 1983 (7"); 2. "Wciąż bardziej obcy" Released: 1983 (7")

Lady Pank is the debut studio album by Polish pop rock band Lady Pank. It was released on June 20, 1983 in Poland through Tonpress (LP version), and been re-released by different record labels.

Lady Pank is considered to be one of the most important albums in the history of Polish rock.

== Track listing ==
No.	Title	Length
1.	"Mniej niż zero" (eng. Less than zero)	4:04
2.	"Kryzysowa narzeczona" (eng. Crisis fiancee)	4:01
3.	"Fabryka małp" (eng. Factory of apes)	3:43
4.	"Pokręciło mi się w głowie" (eng. My head was dizzy)	3:36
5.	"Du du" (eng. Doo doo)	4:00
6.	"Zakłócenie porządku" (eng. Disturbance of the order)	1:33
7.	"Zamki na piasku" (eng. Castles on the sand)	4:32
8.	"Wciąż bardziej obcy" (eng. Still more a stranger)	5:31
9.	"Vademecum skauta" (eng. Vademecum of a Scout)	4:14
10.	"Moje Kilimandżaro" (eng. My Kilimanjaro)	4:21

=== Bonus Tracks ===
No.	Title	Length
12.	"Minus 10 w Rio" (eng. Minus 10 in Rio)	4:51
13.	"Mała Lady Punk" (eng. Little Lady Punk)	3:25
14.	"Raport z N" (eng. Report from N.)	3:19
15.	"Rysunkowa postać" (eng. Cartoon character)	3:40
16.	"Sly"	4:10
17.	"This is only Rock'n'Roll"	4:01
18.	"Tańcz, głupia, tańcz" (eng. Dance, silly, dance)	4:41
19.	"Mniej niż zero (hardrock version)"	2:52
20.	"Vademecum skauta (reggae version)"	4:05

== Personnel ==
- Jan Borysewicz – lead guitar, guitar, vocal, music
- Janusz Panasewicz – vocal
- Edmund Stasiak – guitar
- Paweł Mścisławski – bass guitar
- Jarosław Szlagowski – drums
- Andrzej Mogielnicki – lyrics
- Mariusz Zabrodzki – co-producer, Moog syntheziser
- Cezary Szlazak – saxophone
- Aleksander Januszewski – artwork
- Andrzej Karczewski – photography

== Release history ==
Year	Label	Format	Country	Out of Print?	Notes
1983	Tonpress	LP	Poland	Yes	original LP release
1984	Tonpress	CC	Poland	Yes	original CC release
1991	Tonpress	CD	Poland	Yes	CD reissue; bonus tracks
1999	Koch International	CD	Poland	Yes	CD reissue; remastered
2000	Starling S.A.	CD	Poland	Yes	CD reissue; bonus tracks; remastered
2000	Tomi	CD	Poland	Yes	CD reissue; bonus tracks; remastered
2002	Andromeda	CD	Poland	Yes	Box release; bonus tracks; remastered
2003; 2007; 2008	MTJ	CD	Poland	No	Box release; CD reissue; bonus tracks; remastered
