= Lady Pank =

Polish rock band

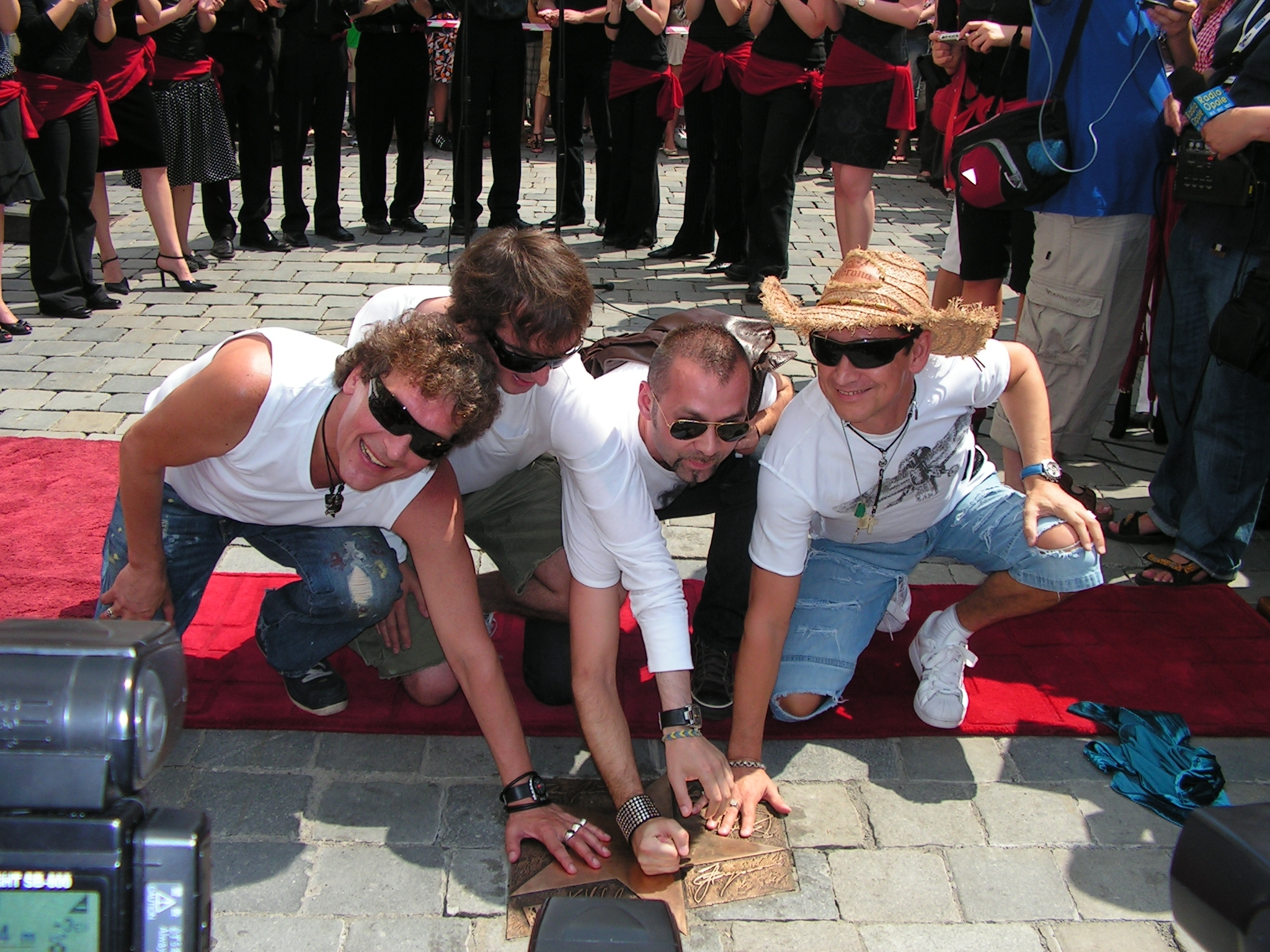
- Lady Pank in 2007

Background information
- Origin: Wrocław, Poland
- Genre: Rock
- Years active: 1981–1986; 1987–1991; 1994–present
- Labels: Starling S.A., Negro, Agencja Artystyczna MTJ, BMG Poland, Intersonus, MCA, Klub płytowy "Razem", Koch International, Sony BMG Music Entertainment Poland, Universal Music Poland, Sony Music Entertainment Poland, TMM Polska, Zic Zac, Tonpress, Tomi, Andromeda, Polskie Nagrania Muza, Digiton, GM Records, Poljazz, Savitor, Zbigniew Mamok & Jan Borysewicz, Bo Production, Ania Box Music, Silverton, Sky Media / Presspublica Sp z o.o., ZPR-Records, Polska the Times
- Members: Jan Borysewicz; Janusz Panasewicz; Kuba Jabłoński; Krzysztof Kieliszkiewicz
- Website: Official Website

Lady Pank is a Polish rock band, started in 1981 in Wrocław by Jan Borysewicz and Andrzej Mogielnicki. One of the most popular groups in history of Polish rock. Its first hit was “Mała Lady Punk” ("Little Lady Punk").

Lady Pank garnered some attention in the United States in 1985, when MTV placed the video for the band's single "Minus Zero" on rotation. The title was somewhat changed for the English language release; the original Polish title “Mniej niż zero” means "less than zero".

The video for one of the band's greatest hits “Zawsze tam gdzie ty” is set on Chicago's 'L', the Quincy Station in particular.

== Lineups and musicians ==
Jan Borysewicz and Janusz Panasewicz have been with the group since the beginning, and have maintained a specific and recognizable sound for the quintet. Most of the lead vocals are done by Panasewicz, and occasionally by Borysewicz.

The original members of band were:

- Jan Borysewicz - solo guitar
- Janusz Panasewicz - vocals
- Paweł Mścisławski - bass guitar
- Edmund Stasiak - guitar
- Jarosław Szlagowski - drums

The band's current line up is:

- Jan Borysewicz - solo guitar/vocals
- Janusz Panasewicz - vocals
- Kuba Jabłoński - drums
- Krzysztof Kieliszkiewicz - bass guitar
- Michał Sitarski - guitar

The band's most popular songs are: Tańcz głupia, tańcz ("Dance, stupid, dance"), Mniej niż zero ("Less than zero"), Wciąż bardziej obcy ("More and more of a stranger"), Kryzysowa narzeczona ("Crisis fiancée"), Zamki na piasku ("Castles on the sand"), Tacy sami ("Just the same"), Zostawcie Titanica ("Leave the Titanic alone"), Mała wojna ("Little war"), Zawsze tam gdzie ty ("Always there, where you are"), Znowu pada deszcz ("It's raining again"), Na granicy ("On the border"), Stacja Warszawa ("Warsaw Station").

== Live performances ==
In 1983 alone, the group performed live 369 times. After another three years the total number of live shows grew to over 800 — a record at the time in Poland.

On 30 November 2000, Lady Pank played a jubilee concert in Wrocław, celebrating the group's 18th birthday.

In 2007, they were celebrating their 25th birthday and promoting the album Strach się bać during the tour.

In 2008, they started playing symphonic concerts with Orkiestra Symfoników Gdańskich.

In 2012, they played several symphonic concerts, celebrating their 30th jubilee.

In 2014–15 they went on an acoustic tour over Poland, recording material for the album Akustycznie.

In late 2015, they started their "The Best of" Tour.

In years 2016–2017 they played a tour, promoting their album Miłość i władza celebrating their 35 years on stage.

In 2018, they played LP1 Tour, promoting their album LP1.

In 2021, they started a tour promoting album LP40, celebrating their 40th birthday. The tour ended in Warsaw on 17 December 2022. On 22 June 2022 they recorded their "MTV Unplugged" concert.

== Instruments ==
Borysewicz and the other guitar players prefer Fender Stratocaster guitars, although he also uses guitars such as Gibson, Ibanez or Charvel. His favourite guitar in years 2000-2018 was Fender Stratocaster Lone Star in candy apple red colour with his daughter's hand reflected in white paint. Since 2018 he is playing a Fender Stratocaster Jeff Beck Signature models. In 2020, he released his signature model of Laboga Diamond Sound combo amp series. His sound on the first Lady Pank album is most of 1978 Fender Stratocaster, Marshall Amplification amps, BOSS CE-1 Chorus and BOSS CS-1 Compressor.

== Discography ==
=== Studio albums ===
Title	Album details	Peak chart positions	Sales	Certifications
Title	Album details	POL	Sales	Certifications
Lady Pank	Released: June 20, 1983; Label: Tonpress; Formats: LP, CD, CS, digital download	—		POL: Gold
Ohyda	Released: May 14, 1984; Label: Savitor; Formats: LP, CD, CS, digital download	—		
Drop Everything	Released: March 1, 1985; Label: MCA, Klub Płytowy Razem; Formats: LP, CD, CS, digital download	—		
LP 3	Released: September 22, 1986; Label: Polskie Nagrania Muza; Formats: LP, CD	—		
O dwóch takich, co ukradli księżyc	Released: June 16, 1986; Label: PolJazz; Formats: LP, CD, CS, digital download	—		
O dwóch takich, co ukradli księżyc cz. 2	Released: 1988; Label: PolJazz; Formats: LP	—		
Tacy sami	Released: October 10, 1988; Label: Polskie Nagrania Muza; Formats: LP, CD, digital download	—		
Zawsze tam – gdzie ty	Released: August 20, 1990; Label: ZPR Records; Formats: LP, CD, CS, digital download	—		
Na na	Released: September 12, 1994; Label: Koch International; Formats: CD, CS, digital download	—	POL: 200,000+	POL: Platinum
Międzyzdroje	Released: July 15, 1996; Label: Starling S.A.; Formats: CD, digital download	—		
Zimowe graffiti	Released: 1996; Label: Starling S.A.; Formats: CD, digital download	—		
W transie	Released: October 13, 1997; Label: Starling S.A.; Formats: CD, digital download	—		
Łowcy głów	Released: June 22, 1998; Label: Starling S.A.; Formats: CD, digital download	—		
Nasza reputacja	Released: September 11, 2000; Label: Zic Zac; Formats: CD	18		
Teraz	Released: June 28, 2004; Label: BMG Poland; Formats: CD	3		
Strach się bać	Released: May 28, 2007; Label: Sony BMG; Formats: CD	3	POL: 15,000+	POL: Gold
Maraton	Released: June 20, 2011; Label: Sony Music; Formats: CD, digital download	1	POL: 15,000+	POL: Gold
Miłość i władza	Released: 15 April 2016; Label: Universal Music; Formats: CD, LP, digital download	2	POL: 15,000	POL: Gold
Zimowe graffiti 2	Released: 10 November 2017; Label: Universal Music; Formats: CD, LP digital download	8		
LP1	Released: 15 June 2018; Label: Agora S. A.; Formats: CD, LP, digital download	3	POL: 30,000+	POL: Platinum
LP40	Released: 12 March 2021; Label: Agora S. A.; Formats: CD, LP, digital download	2		
45	Released: 2025			
"—" denotes a recording that did not chart or was not released in that territory.
