= De Música Ligera =

Single by Soda Stereo

from the album Canción Animal
- Released: October 15, 1990
- Recorded: 1990
- Studio: Criteria Studios (Miami, Florida)
- Genre: Rock
- Length: 3:33
- Label: Sony Music
- Composers: Gustavo Cerati; Zeta Bosio
- Lyricist: Gustavo Cerati
- Producers: Gustavo Cerati; Zeta Bosio

Soda Stereo singles chronology
| "Canción Animal" (1990) | "De Música Ligera" (1990) | "Cae el Sol" (1990) |

"De Música Ligera" is a song by the Argentine rock band Soda Stereo, released as a promotional single for their fifth studio album Canción Animal (1990). It is widely considered to be Soda Stereo's most popular song. It has become an anthem of rock en español and one of the most recognized compositions of Argentine rock. The single was the last song performed at their farewell concert "El Último Concierto" in 1997.

== Composition ==
=== Music ===
The title and spirit of the song was taken from some albums Gustavo Cerati's parents had, which were named Clásicos ligeros de todos los tiempos ("Light classics of all times").

Gustavo said, "The idea was to create instrumentation like that, very classical, of a band, and at the same time that had a light spirit."

Like the lyrics, the music is deceptive: simple and complex simultaneously. The whole song is built from the riff and supported by the sequence carried out by the guitar. Four chords (Bm, G, D, A), emphasize the progression from G to D, where the power of the song is concentrated. The complexity of the harmony stems from the fact that the drop from D to G occurs in the middle of each verse, and not the beginning or end as the effect could suggest at first glance. And it is exactly this lack of coordination between the singing and harmony which gives rise to the irresistible attraction that has become one of the most successful songs in the history of Latin rock.

Cerati has said that "De Música Ligera is one of the most instant hits that I did with Soda Stereo."

Charly Alberti remembered that:

We recorded it in a single take, in a studio in Miami. This is unusual, because usually it takes like fifteen takes to record. We later recorded two additional versions, to try out different things, but they didn't stick. The version that is heard on the album is the first take we did.

=== Lyrics ===
The lyrics of the song consist of a total of twelve lines; a first verse, a chorus, a second verse, and a final chorus. Effectively it is his desire for and disdain of a pop music hit analogized as a relationship with a woman. The word choice leads to meanings that are cryptic and intentionally ambiguous: "musica ligera" means both "Light music" as in easy listening, as well as "fast music" as in pop music. "Masas" was late 80's to early 90's Argentine slang for a rhythmic pounding, both in sexual intercourse and as a physical altercation.

Cerati recalls this love of "musica ligera" as something completely obsessive ("nada más queda" (nothing else remains)), and also permanent ("nada nos libra" (nothing frees us)).

In the first two verses, Cerati sings "ella durmió al calor de las masas, y yo desperté queriendo soñarla" (she slept to the heat of the pounding, and I woke up wanting to dream of her). The expression is both beautiful and complex: it expresses a clash of states that are worlds apart (sleep and wakefulness), but also the desire to dream of that which has awakened him, to be reunited with her in his own dream. It also expresses her in sated post pounding slumber, contraposed with his lucidity, he cannot help seeing things and her as they sordidly are.

Then he sings "algún tiempo atrás pensé en escribirle" (some time ago I thought about writing) "Que nunca sorteé las trampas del amor" (that I never sorted out the traps of love). The lyrics then conclude telling everyone that he will not send "cenizas de rosas" (ashes of roses), and "ni pienso evitar un roce secreto" (nor he will avoid a secret caress), confirming the duality of "de aquel amor de música ligera" (of that love of pop music).

Regarding the theme and the lyrics, Gustavo Cerati once said:

The first thing I always write is the chorus, which here was: "de aquel amor de música ligera" ("of that love of light/fast music"). The lyrics talk about music itself: "She slept in the heat of the masses and I woke up wanting to dream of her." That's it, it's the music talking! Between us, we felt and knew that this song was going to explode. Sometimes you feel that. And because of the way it came out so instantly, it was as if ten thousand groups had played it before. Perhaps it was not like that... ten thousand groups played it after!

The song has been widely played by hundreds of bands, in different octaves and variations.

== Music video ==
The accompanying music video to the song was directed by Alfredo Lois and shows the band performing the song behind a colorful background

== Charts ==
| Chart (2014) | Peak position |
|---|---|
| US Latin Digital Song Sales (Billboard) | 18 |

== Certifications ==
| Region | Certification | Certified units/sales |
|---|---|---|
| Mexico (AMPROFON) | 4× Diamond+Platinum+Gold | 1,290,000^{‡} |
| Spain (Promusicae) Remastered Version | Gold | 30,000^{‡} |
^{*} Sales figures based on certification alone.^{‡} Sales+streaming figures based on certification alone.
