= En la Ciudad de la Furia =

Single by Soda Stereo

from the album Doble Vida
- Released: July 1988
- Recorded: June 1988
- Venue: Sorcerer Sound, New York City
- Genre: New wave
- Length: 5:52
- Label: Sony
- Songwriter: Gustavo Cerati
- Producer: Carlos Alomar

Soda Stereo singles chronology
"Prófugos" (1986)	"En la Ciudad de la Furia" (1988)	"Lo Que Sangra (La Cúpula)" (1989)

Music video
- "En la Ciudad de la Furia" on YouTube

"En la Ciudad de la Furia" (Spanish for "In the City of Fury") is a song by Argentine rock band Soda Stereo, written by lead vocalist and guitarist Gustavo Cerati. It was released in 1989 as the first single from their 1988 album Doble Vida. The music video, released in 1989, was a finalist for the International Viewer's Choice in the 1990 MTV Video Music Awards.

== Lyrics ==
The lyrics refer to the Argentine capital of Buenos Aires, the "city of fury" that is referenced in the song. It is told from the perspective of an undefined narrator, an elusive, mythical winged man who flies through the city only at night and seeks shelter before its citizens wake up. He claims no one except the woman he addresses can see him or knows about him, but that he is nevertheless part of all of them. He is, in essence, the spirit of the city itself; sexual, daring, elusive but perhaps also fearful, like the citizens themselves. Their faces are mentioned in two stanzas: one describing their fear ("En sus caras veo el temor") and their anger which is ever present in their faces, as their destiny for living in the city ("Ese destino de furia es lo que en sus caras persiste).

The chorus returns to a hopeful and longing mood in a melancholic melody, where the narrator says he will be welcomed by the woman and he will sleep wrapped in her legs. Then she, as both a lover and accomplice, will help to hide him and to disappear in the fog, before the city awakens again.

== Music ==
The music style can be described as an alternative/gothic rock sound with some new wave elements and shows the new sound that the band had adopted, changing from their previous albums. This song is a "harbinger" of the sound that the band was about to adopt as its own, especially alternative rock, the style in which this song was performed.

The song starts with a riff that Gustavo Cerati created when he was 14 years old. When Cerati begins to sing, the guitar stops, and the drums are alone with the bass guitar so that it makes a strong chord. After a while, the riff comes back.

== Music video ==
The music video, which was directed by Alfredo Lois, was photographed in ambient black and white. Filmed in Buenos Aires (that appears to be "the city of fury" mentioned in the lyrics), it shows several downtown areas and buildings and people moving in that landscape.

The story revolves around an ordinary man who walks among the crowd, plagued by the conflicts created by urban life. This man is shown locked in a cage as a metaphor for being unable to escape from his issues. At the end of the video the locked-up man turns out to be Cerati, then the full band appears, all playing in the same cage.

== Notable live performances ==
The song has been played in most of the concerts by the band. One of the most significant performances was as the opening song of the last concert (El Último Concierto) by Soda Stereo on 20 September 1997, having a strong, distinctive final guitar solo.

In the presentation at the MTV studios in Miami on 25 September 1996, recorded as the live album Comfort y Música Para Volar, the band completely changed the original version, with a blues style, being much slower and complex musically. This performance had Colombian singer Andrea Echeverri as a guest singer in the chorus.

In the extensive Gira Me Verás Volver of 2007 (You'll See Me Come Back tour), in which the band reunited after 10 years of not playing together, this song was performed at every concert.

== Remix version ==
A remix version is included in the remix album Zona de Promesas, called "En la Ciudad de la Furia [Dance Mix]".

== Charts ==
Chart (2014)	Peak position
US Latin Digital Song Sales (Billboard)	41

== Certifications ==
Region	Certification	Certified units/sales
Mexico (AMPROFON)	Gold	30,000^{*}
^{*} Sales figures based on certification alone.
