= Comfort y Música Para Volar =

1996 album by Soda Stereo

MTV Unplugged: Comfort y Música Para Volar

Live album / Studio Album by Soda Stereo
- Released: 25 September 1996
- Recorded: 12 March 1996
- Studios: Post Edge (Miami, US)
- Genres: Alternative rock, space rock, psychedelic rock
- Label: BMG Argentina/Ariola

Soda Stereo chronology
Sueño Stereo (1995)	MTV Unplugged: Comfort y Música Para Volar (1996)	El Último Concierto (1997)

Comfort y Música Para Volar

Video by Soda Stereo
- Released: 22 January 2007
- Recorded: 12 March 1996
- Studios: Post Edge (Miami, US)
- Genres: Alternative rock, neo-psychedelia, electronic music, acoustic rock, chamber pop
- Label: Sony

Soda Stereo chronology
El Último Concierto (2005)	Comfort y Música Para Volar (2007)	Gira Me Verás Volver (2008)

MTV Unplugged: Comfort y Música Para Volar (Spanish for Comfort and music for flying) is a part-live, part-studio album recorded by Argentine rock band Soda Stereo. The first seven tracks were recorded live at MTV Studios in Miami, Florida, for the show MTV Unplugged. The remaining four tracks were outtakes from the Sueño Stereo album recorded in studio. The album was released by BMG Argentina in 1996. For most of the televised set, the band used conventional "plugged" instruments rather than acoustic "unplugged" ones. This contradiction is alluded to in the fading "Un" prefix of the word "Unplugged" depicted in the album cover. Soda Stereo was the second Latin band to depart from the use of only acoustic instruments, the first being Caifanes in 1994.

== Track listing ==
1. En la Ciudad de la Furia (Vocals by Andrea Echeverri)
2. Un misil en mi placard
3. Entre caníbales
4. Té para 3 (Contains a fragment of Cementerio Club by Luis Alberto Spinetta)
5. Ángel eléctrico
6. Ella usó mi cabeza como un revólver
7. Sonoman (Banda de sonido) (Keyboard by Iain Baker)
8. Planeador
9. Coral
10. Superstar

== 2007 Release ==
October 2007 saw the re-release of Comfort y Música Para Volar in both CD and DVD formats, featuring the complete MTV performance on audio and video respectively but without the Sueño Stereo outtakes included in the original release. The new tracks include the cover of Vox Dei's song Genesis, which aired on the MTV network but was not included on the first edition.

1. Un misil en mi placard
2. En la ciudad de la furia
3. Entre caníbales
4. Pasos
5. Zoom
6. Cuando pase el temblor
7. Té para 3
8. Ángel eléctrico
9. Terapia de amor intensiva
10. Disco eterno
11. Ella usó mi cabeza como un revólver
12. Paseando por Roma
13. Génesis

== Personnel ==
Soda Stereo

- Gustavo Cerati: lead vocals and backing vocals, guitars
- Zeta Bosio: bass, electric-acoustic guitar and backing vocals
- Charly Alberti: hybrid drums

Additional personnel

- Tweety González: synthesizers, electric piano and sampler
- Pedro Fainguersch: viola
- Diego Fainguersch: cello
- Ezequiel Fainguersch: bassoon
- Andrea Echeverri: backing vocals on "En la ciudad de la furia"
- Iain Baker: synthesizers in track 8

== Certifications ==
Region	Certification	Certified units/sales
Mexico (AMPROFON)	Gold	100,000^{‡}
United States (RIAA)	Platinum (Latin)	60,000^{‡}
^{‡} Sales+streaming figures based on certification alone.
