= Sueño Stereo =

Studio album by Soda Stereo
- Released: 21 June 1995
- Recorded: 1994–1995
- Studios: Estudios Supersónico, Buenos Aires, Argentina; Matrix, London, UK
- Genres: Alternative rock; art rock; experimental rock; neo-psychedelia; Britpop
- Length: 53:08
- Labels: Sony BMG; Ariola
- Producers: Gustavo Cerati; Zeta Bosio

Soda Stereo chronology
Zona de Promesas (1993)	Sueño Stereo (1995)	Comfort y Música Para Volar (1996)

Singles from Sueño Stereo
- 1. "Ella usó mi cabeza como un revólver" Released: 1995; 2. "Zoom" Released: 1995; 3. "Disco eterno" Released: 1996; 4. "Paseando por Roma" Released: 1996

Professional ratings
Review scores
Source	Rating
AllMusic	4/5 stars

Sueño Stereo (Spanish for Stereo Dream) is the seventh and final studio album recorded by Argentine rock band Soda Stereo. It was released by BMG Argentina in 1995. It is considered one of the most important alternative rock records in Spanish and one of the most successful by the band. Rolling Stone considered it the fourth-best in Latin rock history.

In just fifteen days of sales in Latin America, the album went platinum. The album was the centerpiece of the extensive Sueño Stereo tour that the band undertook in Venezuela, Colombia, Peru, Chile, Honduras, Panama, Costa Rica, Mexico and the United States, which began on September 8, 1995, in Buenos Aires, Argentina, and ended on 24 April 1996 in Santiago, Chile.

During the 1996 MTV Video Music Awards, the music video for "Ella usó mi cabeza como un revólver", directed by Stanley Gonczanski, won the Award for International Viewer's Choice in the MTV Latin America category, the first award of the kind given to Latin music.

== Background ==
Although Soda Stereo were known by mixing many styles and genres inside a same album, this record goes beyond and it has many more different sounds and influences, like pop, pop rock, alternative rock, dream pop, Britpop, electronic, shoegaze, progressive rock, psychedelic pop or ambient pop. Sueño Stereo was heavily inspired by the Beatles' Revolver (1966) and contains many references to it, such as the colors on the album cover; a song with the word "Revolver" in it, the lead single "Ella usó mi cabeza como un revólver"; and songs like "Paseando por Roma", which has a bass line based on "Taxman" and strings in the chorus based on "Got to Get You into My Life", as well as the B-side "Superstar" which is based on "She Said She Said". In 1995 they traveled to London, UK, to make the final mix of the album, and in an interview they spoke about the Beatles influence throughout their career.

Tracks 9 through 12 in the second half of the album – "Crema de Estrellas", "Planta", "X-Playo", and "Moirè" – are musically strung together, forming a medley likened by Cerati to a "little concept album". The lyrics of the song refer to a drug trip, inspired by Cerati's experiences with ayahuasca, and follow each other chronologically.

== Track listing ==
All lyrics are written by Gustavo Cerati.

No.	Title	Writer(s)	Length
1.	"Ella Usó Mi Cabeza Como un Revólver" (She Used My Head as a Revolver)	Cerati; Zeta Bosio; Charly Alberti	4:32
2.	"Disco Eterno" (Eternal Disk)	Cerati; Bosio; Alberti	5:46
3.	"Zoom"	Cerati	3:27
4.	"Ojo de la Tormenta" (Eye of the Storm)	Cerati	4:33
5.	"Efecto Doppler" (Doppler Effect)	Cerati	5:03
6.	"Paseando por Roma" (Passing Through Rome)	Cerati; Bosio; Alberti	3:35
7.	"Pasos" (Steps)	Cerati	3:54
8.	"Ángel Eléctrico" (Electric Angel)	Cerati; Bosio; Alberti	4:36
9.	"Crema de Estrellas" (Star Cream)	Cerati	4:37
10.	"Planta" (Plant)	Cerati; Bosio	4:52
11.	"X-Playo"	Cerati	4:07
12.	"Moirè"	Cerati	4:02
Total length:			53:08

== Personnel ==
Soda Stereo:

- Gustavo Cerati – lead vocals, guitar, fretless bass guitar, Rhodes piano, synthesizers, producer
- Zeta Bosio – bass guitar, backing vocals, synthesizers, harmonica, producer
- Charly Alberti – drums, percussion

Additional personnel:

- Alejandro Terán – viola
- Janos Morel – first violin
- Mauricio Alves – second violin
- Pablo Flumetti – cello
- Roy Málaga – piano
- Flavio Etcheto – trumpet

== Certifications ==
Region	Certification	Certified units/sales
Argentina (CAPIF)	2× Platinum	120,000^{^}
United States (RIAA)	Gold (Latin)	30,000^{‡}
^{^} Shipments figures based on certification alone.^{‡} Sales+streaming figures based on certification alone.
