= Jan Borysewicz =

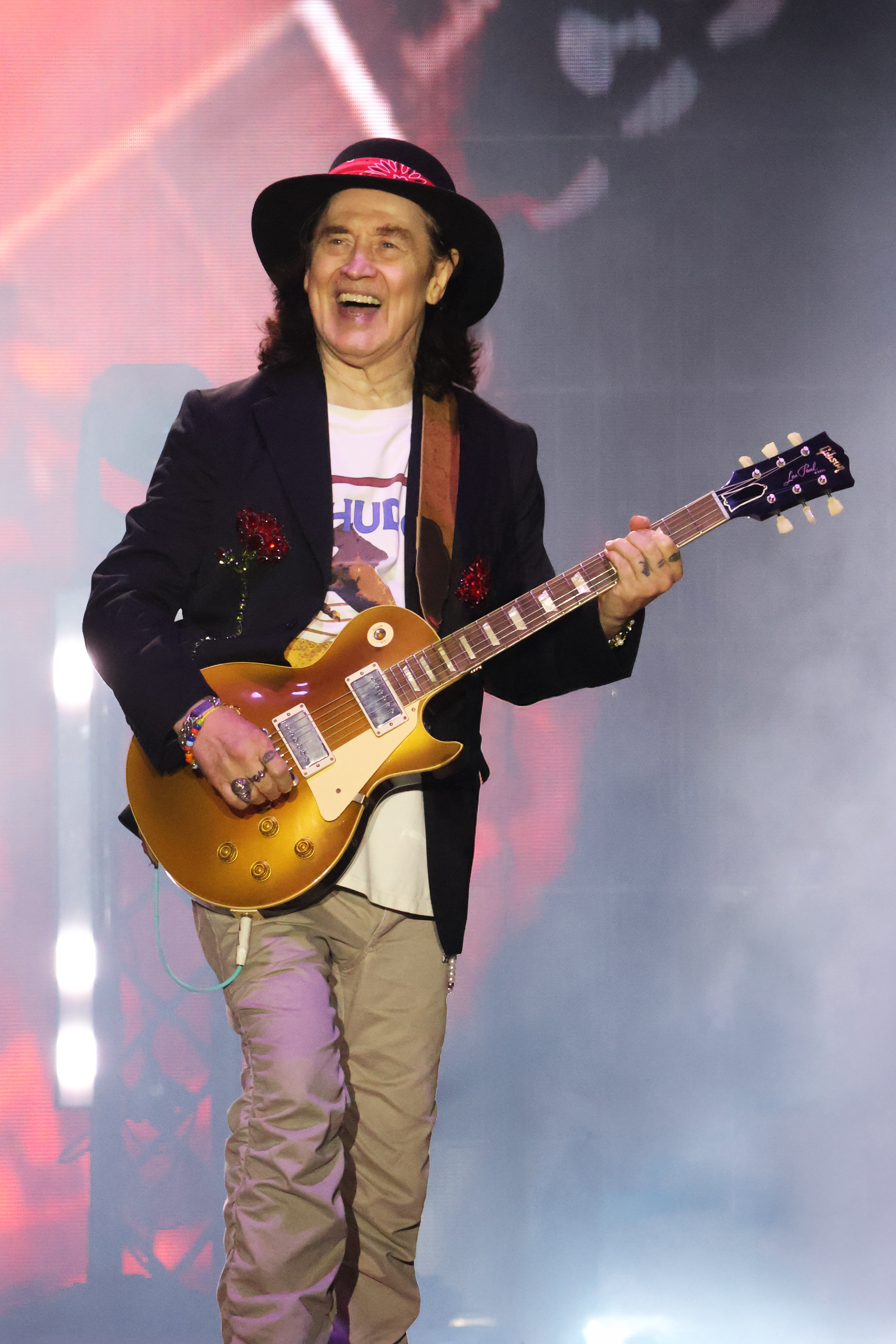
- Jan Borysewicz, 2025

Background information
- Born: 17 April 1955 (age 71); Wrocław, Poland
- Genres: Pop, rock, pop rock
- Occupation: Musician
- Instruments: Main: Guitars, vocals Occasional: keyboards, bass guitar, drums
- Labels: BMG Poland, Sony Music Entertainment Poland

Jan Józef Borysewicz (born April 17, 1955) is the co-founder and guitar player of Lady Pank, a Polish rock band. He composed all but two of their songs.

Borysewicz was born in Wrocław. In the 1970s, he played for Izabela Trojanowska and Budka Suflera. Borysewicz formed Lady Pank in the spring of 1982.

== Discography ==
=== Studio albums ===
Title	Album details	Peak chart positions
Title	Album details	POL
Królowa ciszy	Released: 1988; Label: PolJazz; Formats: CD, LP, CS, digital download	—
Wojna w mieście	Released: 1992; Label: Bo Production; Formats: CD, CS, digital download	—
Moja wolność	Released: 1995; Label: Starling S.A.; Formats: CD, CS, digital download	—
Miya	Released: February 15, 2010; Label: Sony Music Entertainment Poland; Formats: CD	26
"—" denotes a recording that did not chart or was not released in that territory.

=== Collaborative albums ===
Title	Album details	Peak chart positions	Sales	Certifications
Title	Album details	POL	Sales	Certifications
Borysewicz & Kukiz (with Paweł Kukiz)	Released: February 24, 2003; Label: BMG Poland; Formats: CD	1	POL: 35,000+	POL: Gold
Bal maturalny (with Rozbójnik Alibaba)	Released: November 14, 2014; Label: Step Records; Formats: CD, digital download	4	POL: 30,000+	POL: Platinum
"—" denotes a recording that did not chart or was not released in that territory.
