= Víctimas del Vaciamiento =

Studio album by Hermética
- Released: March 1994
- Recorded: August–September 1993
- Studio: Estudios del Abasto, Buenos Aires
- Genre: Thrash metal
- Label: Radio Trípoli Discos

Hermética chronology
En vivo 1993 Argentina (1993)	Víctimas del Vaciamiento (1994)	Lo último (1995)

Víctimas del Vaciamiento (Spanish: [ˈbiɣ̞.t̪i.mas d̪el ba.sjaˈmjẽn̪.t̪o], lit. 'Victims of the Emptiness') is the third and last studio album of Argentine thrash metal band Hermética, released in 1994 by Radio Trípoli Discos. It was certified gold, and the band broke up a few months after promoting the album at the Estadio Obras Sanitarias, an arena in Buenos Aires, Argentina.

== Background ==
Hermética's first drummer, Tony Scotto, left the band in 1991 and was replaced by Claudio Strunz, right before they recorded Ácido Argentino. The album was certified gold by the Argentine Chamber of Phonograms and Videograms Producers (CAPIF) for its sales in Argentina. The label, Radio Tripoli, proposed them to make the new album in a studio of Miami or Los Angeles. The leader Ricardo Iorio rejected the proposal, preferring to stay in the country.

== Production ==
Drummer Claudio Strunz had better recording conditions than on Ácido Argentino, as he had both more time to practice the songs and experience with the band. Unlike the previous album, the new one had more varied song structures and a higher coordination with the guitar style of Antonio Romano. The working name for the album was Desde adentro (lit. 'From the inside'); it was later changed to Víctimas del Vaciamiento, a song from their first album, Hermética. The band asked the plastic artist Marina Devesa to do the artwork, based on ideas of Iorio, who wanted a cover similar to the style of 15th-century Dutch painter Hieronymus Bosch. The artwork was rejected because it turned out to be similar to that of a Spanish band. She made a new version, which was also rejected. Then the band asked Christian Heredia, a painter that designed banners for the band, to rework Devesa's last artwork, creating the definitive cover.

Ricardo Iorio wrote all the lyrics of the album. Unlike previous albums, where songs addressed several topics, each song of the new album was focused on a specific topic. For example, "Otro día para ser" is about environmentalism, "Olvídalo y volverá por más" is about the corruption scandals involving the mayor of Buenos Aires Carlos Grosso, "Hospitalarias realidades" is about health care in Argentina, "Buscando razón" is about musicians who change their music genres, and "Del colimba" is about conscription in Argentina. The album also includes a song, "Moraleja", a folklore song in stark contrast with the thrash metal of the rest of the album. The band clarified in interviews that this song was composed during tours as a joke.

== Promotion and break-up ==
The band initially considered promoting the album with a concert in Stadium, the venue where they recorded En vivo 1993 Argentina. The idea was discarded, as the place was not large enough to accommodate their growing audience. Instead, they made a concert at the Estadio Obras Sanitarias. They recorded a live album, including a thrash metal cover version of the song De los pagos del tiempo by folk singer José Larralde. As the album was certified gold, they arranged to receive the award on-stage, during the concert.

The band broke up a few months later. The relations among the members of the band became more conflictual. The singer Claudio O'Connor said that Iorio shifted "from leader to tyrant, but we could not go on without him because the name is his and the lyrics are his. He had a lot of clout inside the band". He also claimed that the money was distributed unevenly among the members of the band, with Iorio keeping 40% of the band's earnings. After the breakup, Iorio started the band Almafuerte with guitarist Claudio Marciello and drummer Claudio Cardacci. The other members of Hermética stayed together as Malón.

== Reception ==
In a 2023 review of Iorio's work, Sebastián Chaves of Rolling Stone considered Victimas del Vaciamiento one of the best last albums of any band, possibly because no other Hermética albums were made after it. He noted that the album's context was highly influenced by the presidency of Carlos Menem.

== Track listing ==
No.	Title	Lyrics	Music	Length
1.	"Soy de la Esquina"	Ricardo Iorio	Antonio Romano	3:07
2.	"Otro Día Para Ser"	Ricardo Iorio	Antonio Romano	5:02
3.	"Traicion"	Ricardo Iorio	Antonio Romano	3:10
4.	"Olvidalo y Volvera Por Mas"	Ricardo Iorio	Antonio Romano	3:58
5.	"Hospitalarias Realidades"	Ricardo Iorio	Antonio Romano	3:22
6.	"Buscando Razon"	Ricardo Iorio	Ricardo Iorio	3:39
7.	"Cuando Duerme La Ciudad"	Ricardo Iorio	Ricardo Iorio	4:46
8.	"Ayer Deseo, Hoy Realidad"	Ricardo Iorio	Ricardo Iorio	3:19
9.	"Del Colimba"	Ricardo Iorio	Ricardo Iorio	4:09
10.	"Moraleja"	Ricardo Iorio	Ricardo Iorio/Traditional	2:45
11.	"Tano Solo"	(instrumental)	Antonio Romano	5:55

== Personnel ==
Band

- Claudio O'Connor – lead vocals
- Antonio Romano – guitar
- Ricardo Iorio – bass guitar, lead vocals on "Olvídalo y volverá por más" and "Del colimba", fragment on "Moraleja" and introduction on "Otro día para ser"
- Claudio Strunz – drums

Others

- Alvaro Villagra – Sound engineer, keyboards on "Otro día para ser" and "Cuando duerme la ciudad", piano on "Moraleja"
- Sergio Fasanelli – Executive producer
- Christian Heredia – cover art
- Gonzalo Dobleg – graphic design
- Andrés Violante – photography

== Sales ==
Region	Certification	Certified units/sales
Argentina	—	30,000

== Bibliography ==
- Blumetti, Frank; Mora, Miguel (October 1993). "Hermética: el sonido de la gente" [Hermética: the sound of the people]. Madhouse Extra (in Spanish) (2). Buenos Aires: Editorial Llamoso.
