= En vivo 1993 Argentina =

First live album by Hermética

Live album by Hermética
- Released: 1993
- Recorded: May 15, 1993
- Venue: Stadium, Buenos Aires
- Genre: Thrash metal, heavy metal
- Label: Radio Trípoli Discos

Hermética chronology
Ácido Argentino (1991)	En vivo 1993 Argentina (1993)	Víctimas del Vaciamiento (1994)

En vivo 1993 Argentina (Spanish: Live 1993 Argentina) is the first live album of Argentine heavy metal band Hermética, self-released in 1993.

It was recorded on May 15, 1993 at "Stadium", a venue in Buenos Aires.

A video version of the album (VHS) was also commercialized.

== Reception ==
The album was ranked as the third-best album of the year in the annual survey of the Madhouse magazine for 1993. "Si se calla el cantor", the new song included in the album, was ranked fifth-best song of the year in the aforementioned survey.

== Track listing ==
All songs written and composed by Ricardo Iorio, except where noted.

No.	Title	Writer(s)	Length
1.	"Evitando el ablande"	Antonio Romano, Ricardo Iorio	3:30
2.	"Deja de robar"	Ricardo Iorio, Antonio Romano	3:05
3.	"Predicción"	Antonio Romano, Ricardo Iorio	3:51
4.	"Atravesando todo límite"	Ricardo Iorio, Ana Mourín	4:04
5.	"Sepulcro civil"	Ricardo Iorio, Antonio Romano	4:10
6.	"Ideando la fuga" (V8)	Ricardo Iorio, Osvaldo Civile, Alberto Zamarbide, Gustavo Rowek	3:12
7.	"Desde el oeste"		2:50
8.	"Cráneo candente"	Ricardo Iorio, Antonio Romano	4:16
9.	"Memoria de siglos"		6:07
10.	"Para que no caigas"		3:18
11.	"Del camionero"		4:49
12.	"Tú eres su seguridad"		4:54
13.	"Si se calla el cantor" (Horacio Guarany)	Horacio Guarany	2:48

== Personnel ==
- Ricardo Iorio - Bass, vocals
- Claudio O'Connor - Lead vocals
- Antonio Romano - Guitar
- Claudio Strunz - Drums
