= Argentine heavy metal =

The Argentine heavy metal is a heavy metal music movement that originated in Argentina in the 1980s. The first popular artist was Pappo, who created the band Riff influenced by the contemporary new wave of British heavy metal. V8 was formed at that time as well, and most of its members created notable bands after their respective departures from the band: Ricardo Iorio and Walter Giardino, currently in Almafuerte and Rata Blanca, are still popular. The second half of the 1980s saw the success of hard rock bands such as Kamikaze, Alakran and Rata Blanca, with an aesthetic similar to the contemporary glam metal. Thrash metal bands, such as Hermética, Horcas and Lethal, appeared in the late 80s and early 90s.

Rata Blanca declined its popularity in the 1990s and eventually broke up. Hermética became more popular than V8 during its short existence, and broke up in a controversy between the leader Ricardo Iorio and the other members. Iorio created a new band, Almafuerte, and the former members of Hermética stayed together for some time as Malón. Rata Blanca had a revival later, and the band was rejoined.

== History ==
The Argentine Rock of the late 1970s included bands such as Pappo's Blues, El Reloj, Vox Dei, Billy Bond y La Pesada del Rock and Roll, and Pescado Rabioso. The fans of those bands eventually created the first heavy metal bands. There was no specialized press at the time, and bands and concerts were scarce. Pappo, who was already a famous musician and had been in Europe for some time, created a band influenced by the new wave of British heavy metal, Riff. V8, a relatively lesser-known band, mixed heavy metal and punk rock, and gained attention during an incident at the "Buenos Aires Rock" concert.

The end of the national reorganization process in 1983 allowed an increased activity. Metal was the first heavy metal magazine in Argentina, published in 1983, and "Cuero Pesado" (Spanish: Heavy leather) the first radio program. Many bands, like V8, could release their first full-length albums. However, activity decreased a short time later. Riff broke up when a concert at the Ferrocarril Oeste stadium ended with widespread vandalism, and V8 tried to emigrate to Brazil.

Riff returned in 1985, and V8 returned as well with a new lineup. The international success of Glam metal increased the interest in heavy metal music as well. A new magazine, Riff Raff, appeared and the discos Halley and Cemento became important venues for concerts. The activity decreased again in 1989, during a national economic crisis caused by an hyperinflation.

Glam metal itself never caught on in Argentina, but some hard rock bands used the glam visual style, such as Alakran, Kamikaze and Escocia. The most successful of those bands was Rata Blanca, who made a concert at the José Amalfitani Stadium, the highest attended concert of an Argentine heavy metal band to date. Those bands appeared in Argentina in the late eighties and the initial nineties, some years after the international boom of glam metal; and so did the first thrash metal bands as well. Some of those bands were Horcas, Lethal and Nepal; the most popular one was Hermética, led by ex-V8 bass player Ricardo Iorio. The Argentine Currency Board established in 1991 eased the imports of foreign albums and the tours of international bands.

As of 1995, the popularity of Rata Blanca had declined, and Hermética broke up, with their members starting the rival bands Almafuerte (with Iorio) and Malón (the rest of the band). A.N.I.M.A.L. was popular among the fans of 1990s heavy metal, and they defended their homage to their country.

Horcas increased their popularity with singer Walter Meza. The number of thrash metal bands declined, and the number of power metal bands increased; with Imperio being the most popular in the genre. Malón broke up years later, and Almafuerte regained and increased the popularity of Hermética.

The genre had a huge drawback in the early 2000s, first with the 2001 economic crisis, which forced many small bands to break up. The República Cromañón nightclub fire forced most nightclubs to increase their security; most of them had to close and the remaining ones became too expensive for heavy metal bands. The genre had a slow recovery since then. As of 2014, the most popular bands are Rata Blanca and Almafuerte.
