= Lo último =

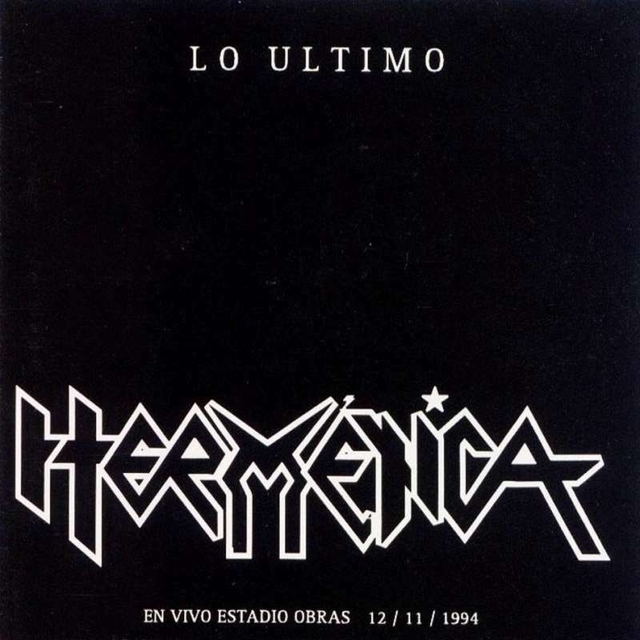

Live album by Hermética
- Released: 1995
- Recorded: November 12, 1994
- Venues: Estadio Obras Sanitarias, Buenos Aires
- Genres: Thrash metal, heavy metal
- Label: DBN

Hermética chronology
Víctimas del Vaciamiento (1994)	Lo último (1995)	En concierto, I & II (1995)

Lo último (in Spanish: "the last") is the second live album of Argentine thrash metal band Hermética, released in 1995 by the DBN label.

It was recorded at the Estadio Obras Sanitarias (Buenos Aires) on November 12, 1994. The band broke up in early 1995, shortly after the concert, so the sleeve shows both a black cover and a title that suggest that it would be the last CD of Hermética.

== Tracklist ==
1. Tano solo
2. Vientos de poder
3. Traición
4. Gil trabajador
5. Otro día para ser
6. Víctimas del vaciamiento
7. Robó un auto
8. Del colimba
9. La revancha de América
10. Vida impersonal
11. Ayer deseo, hoy realidad
12. Cuando duerme la ciudad
13. Soy de la esquina

== Personnel ==
- Ricardo Iorio - Bass, vocals
- Claudio O'Connor - Lead vocals
- Antonio Romano - Guitar
- Claudio Strunz - Drums
