= Mundo guanaco =

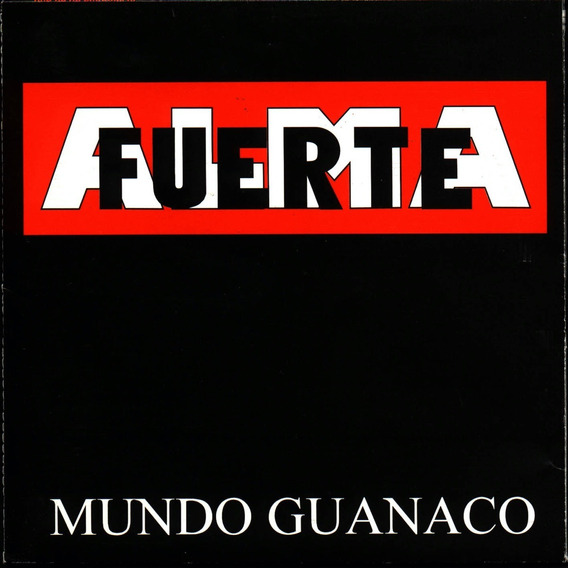

Studio album by Almafuerte
- Released: 1995
- Recorded: 1995
- Genre: Heavy metal

Almafuerte chronology
Mundo guanaco (1995)	Del entorno (1996)

Mundo guanaco is the first album released by the Argentine heavy metal band Almafuerte. This is the first album by Ricardo Iorio after the dissolution of Hermética.

The song "Buitres" is dedicated to his former bandmates, then members of Malón. The song "El Amasijo de un gran sueno" is about Hermetica's dissolution and how this affected Iorio. Most of the songs on this album would be part of a future album by Hermetica. The rest of the material is covers from Argentina folk artists Jose Larralde, Pedro Bonifacio Palacios, Cátulo Castillo and Anibal Troilo.

The first drummer of Almafuerte was Juan Esposito from El Reloj (one of the pioneering rock bands in Argentina). Due to his commitment with El Reloj, he couldn't continue with Almafuerte, and was replaced by Claudio Cardacci.

== Track listing ==
All lyrics by Ricardo Iorio except where noted.

1. Dijo el droguero al drogador [The Dealer Said to the Drug Addict]
2. Desencuentro [Disagreement] - (Anibal Troilo, Cátulo Castillo)
3. El pibe tigre [The Tiger Boy]
4. Como los bueyes [Like The Bullocks] - (Pedro Bonifacio Palacios)
5. Voy a enloquecer [I'm Going Crazy] - (Ricardo Moreno, Ricardo Iorio)
6. El amasijo de un gran sueño [The Murder of a Great Dream]
7. De los pagos del tiempo [From the Lands of Time] - (Jose Larralde)
8. Buitres [Vultures]
9. Sentir indiano [Indian Feeling]
10. Zamba de resurrección [Resurrection Zamba]

== Personnel ==
- Ricardo Iorio - vocals, bass
- Claudio Marciello - guitars
- Claudio Cardacci - drums
