= Espíritu Combativo =

First studio album by Malón

Studio album by Malón
- Released: 1995
- Genre: Thrash metal
- Label: EMI

Malón chronology
Espíritu Combativo	Justicia o Resistencia

Espíritu Combativo (Spanish: Combative spirit) is the debut album by Argentine thrash metal band Malón; it was released in 1995.

== Reception ==
Espíritu combativo was selected as the Argentine album of the year by the readers of the Madhouse magazine. They also included three songs in the top six songs of the year: "Castigador por herencia" (ranked #2), "Malón Mestizo" (ranked #3) and "Síntoma de la infección" (ranked #5, in a tie with "Sentir Indiano" by Almafuerte). It was also ranked #1 in the art cover, and the Argentine videoclip for "Castigador por Herencia".

== Track list ==
1. Malón mestizo
2. Culto siniestro
3. Síntoma de la infección
4. Castigador por herencia
5. Cancha de lodo
6. Espíritu combativo
7. Ciegos del mundo
8. Gatillo fácil
9. Mendigos
10. Fábula del avestruz y el jabalí

== Personnel ==
- Claudio O'Connor - vocals
- Antonio Romano - guitar
- Claudio Strunz - drums
- Karlos Cuadrado - bass
