= En Vivo Obras 2001 =

Live album by Almafuerte
- Released: 2001
- Recorded: 2001
- Genres: Heavy metal, thrash metal, speed metal
- Label: Dejesu Records
- Producer: Ricardo Mollo

Almafuerte chronology
Piedra Libre (1996)	En Vivo Obras 2001 (2001)	Ultimando (2003)

En Vivo Obras 2001 is the third live album by Argentine band Almafuerte recorded and released in 2001. It was recorded at the Estadio Obras Sanitarias in Buenos Aires.

== Track listing ==
1. Introducción
2. Almafuerte
3. Las aguas turbias suben esta vez
4. Homenaje
5. Hombre peste
6. 1999
7. Convide rutero
8. El visitante
9. Los delirios del de facto
10. Amanecer en Open Door
11. Del más allá
12. De un mañana bajo tierra
13. El pibe tigre
14. Lucero del alba
15. A vos amigo
16. Popurrí
17. Libre de temor

== Personnel ==
- Ricardo Iorio - vocals, bass
- Claudio Marciello - guitars
- Bin Valencia - drums
