= O'Connor (band) =

Argentinean hard rock band founded in 1998

- logo of O'Connor

Background information
- Origin: Argentina
- Genres: Hard rock
- Years active: 1998 – present
- Labels: Tockadiscos; Sony Music; PopArt Discos
- Members: Voice: Claudio O'Connor (1998–); Bass: Hernán García (1998–); Guitar: Iván Iñiguez (2011–); Fernando Cosenza (2008-2009, 2015-); Drums: Pablo Naydón (1998–1999, 2002–)
- Past members: Guitar: Pato Pedernera (1998–1999); Alejandro Cota (1999–2007); Lisardo Álvarez (2 shows in 2010); Antonio "Tano" Romano (2 shows in 2010); Darío Casciaro (2010–2011); Drums: Christian Vai (1999–2001); Javier Dorado (2002)

O'Connor is an Argentinean hard rock band founded on 1998 by Claudio O'Connor and Hernán García after leaving the band Malón.

== History ==
O'Connor was created in February 1998 when Claudio O'Connor was still member of Malón as his first idea was to have a parallel personal project to Malón. For unknown factors occurred that year, O'Connor decided to leave Malón and started to give life to the project of his new band; "The project was always very well thought, very consistent, I always had in mind to make progress on this project", Claudio commented. The idea was clear but it needed musicians until Ariel Malizia, former sound operator of Hermética and Malón contacted Claudio with the bassist Hernán García (ex Alakran, Bang bang and Razz) and they started the work on the new material. The rest of the members were "guests" to give life to the project.

In April 1999 they debuted on the stage announced as "the first presentation of Claudio O'Connor after his separation from Malón". They recorded their first album "Hay un lugar". After a while Pablo naydón is replaced by Christian Vai. Christian also proposed Alejandro Cota on the guitar defining a new lining in the band: Claudio O'Connor, voice; Hernán García, bass; Alejandro Cota, guitar; Christian Vai, drums

In the beginning of 2000 O'Connor signed with their current manager Andrés Vignolo. A new album comes with this: "Yerba Mala Nunca Muere", recorded with a new company, Fogón Música. Both this material and "Hay un lugar" was a take off from earlier works, not in differences in the music strength but ideologies, sectarian thematics, the intolerance to other bands and styles. Meaning that the change was not only on the music notes but also on noting the values the musicians had and where they put them. "Yerba Mala Nunca Muere" was officially presented at "Cemento" on April 13, 2000 at full capacity.

Almost two years later, in January 2002, they recorded their third album "Dolarización" at "Panda studios". After their successful presentation in Montevideo, Uruguay the band edited the album simultaneously in Mexico and Brasil. The album was presented in Argentina in "Cemento" again at full capacity. On May 24, 2003 they recorded their first live album "Vive siempre" at "El Teatro". In 2004, after concluding their tour on the Argentine coastline including their presentation with Iron Maiden at Velez Sarsfield stadium, O'Connor recorded its fourth study work titled "El tiempo es tan pequeño" at "Panda studios".

In the year 2006 the band records "Estamos pariendo", their sixth studio disc, this time on a new company, "Del cielito records". Released August 24, 2006, the first cut was "Rock del suicida" and was on rotation on radios and music TV channels.

In 2008 they recorded "Naturaleza muerta", released November 27, 2008 with the first cut being "Jungla". On January 21 and 22, 2010 O'Connor played on two shows with Metallica at River Plate Stadium.

On November 19, 2010 they released "Río extraño" presenting it officially at "La Trastienda Club" on May 7, 2011. Shortly after that, they released "Un lugar que nunca muere vol.1 and 2" on July 22, 2010. Both were a re-edition of the first two studio albums of the band.

On March 26, 2011 O'Connor performed with Ozzy Osbourne at GEBA Stadium

Their latest work was released in March 2012. It is a cover's album titled "Un poco de respeto" containing 10 new songs.

== Discography ==
=== Studio albums ===
- Hay un lugar – 1999
- Yerba mala nunca muere – 2000
- Dolorización – 2002
- El tiempo es tan pequeño – 2004
- Estamos pariendo – 2006
- Naturaleza muerta – 2008
- Río extraño – 2010
- Un poco de respeto (Covers album) – 2012.
- La grieta – 2016

=== Live albums ===
- Vive siempre... – 2003
- Ladécada Tour 1998-2008 – 2008
- Un lugar que nunca muere vol. 1 – 2011
- Un lugar que nunca muere vol. 2 – 2011
