= Ácido Argentino =

Studio album by Hermética

Studio album by Hermética
- Released: December 1991
- Recorded: 1991
- Studios: Estudios Aguilar, Buenos Aires
- Genres: Thrash metal, heavy metal
- Label: Radio Trípoli Discos
- Producer: Hermética

Hermética chronology
| Intérpretes (1990) | Ácido Argentino (1991) | En vivo 1993 Argentina (1993) |

Ácido Argentino is the second studio album by Argentine thrash metal band Hermética, released in 1991 by Trípoli Discos. It is the first album with the drummer Claudio Strunz. The songs were written by Ricardo Iorio and Antonio Romano, and the lyrics by Iorio. It was recorded in 500 hours, and was certified platinum within a few months of its release.

== Background and recording ==
As of 1991, Hermética was growing in popularity. They ceased to make concerts at Arlequines, as the pub was too small for their growing audience, and moved to Cemento, a nightclub that was moving away from its origins in disco music and hosting rock concerts instead. They made all the remaining concerts of the year in that nightclub. During the year they played with Todos Tus Muertos, Pobres Pibes, Nepal, Militia, Devastación, Rapier, Resistencia Nativa, etc.

The drummer Tony Scotto resigned from the band, in disagreement over the way to manage it. His replacement was Claudio Strunz, drummer of Heinkel. The band already knew him, because Strunz owned their rehearsal room, and he had already played with the band in rehearsals a few times Scotto could not attend and in the sound tests before Scotto's last concert with the band. Their first concert was in a music festival in Sunchales, Santa Fe. Strunz had to learn all the songs of the band in a pair of weeks before going on a tour, and after it he had to learn all the new songs for the new album, also in a pair of weeks.

The band had a limited recording time, of only 150 hours. Strunz had only six hours to record all the drums, and Iorio had to finish some lyrics in the studios.

The cover is an illustration by José Laluz. Iorio proposed to place it within a distinctive bright orange frame. Sergio Fasanelli, director of Tripoli, praised the idea: it helped the album to visually stand out among other albums, such as in shop windows. Iorio once commented that he also proposed to add lysergic acid to the cover, but it is unclear if that was a real proposal or just a joke made during an interview. The cover also has a UV lacquer treatment, even though most albums had ceased doing so. The cover features Uncle Sam abousing of a woman with a phrygian cap, police attacking the Mothers of Plaza de Mayo, ravens around a destroyed church, and other images lifted from the lyrics of the songs.

As it was usual with the band, Iorio proposed songs composed with a classical guitar, which were refined later by Romano into proper Thrash Metal songs. Usually, the songs proposed by Romano had a little higher complexity, while songs proposed by Iorio were more straightforward, as Iorio gave priority to the lyrics. Romano compared two fan-favorite songs from the album, "Vientos de Poder" and Memoria de Siglos". "Vientos de Poder", with music by Romano, has twisted riffs, while he considered that "Memoria de Siglos" may be monotonous and even boring if played as an instrumental song; the reason of its popularity is in its lyrics.

The album was released in 1991, when LP records began to be replaced by CD-ROM albums.

== Reception ==
Within a few months, the album sold more than 60,000 copies and was certified platinum. It was the first album of the band with massive sales and, as of 2022, it is still being sold.

The magazine Rolling Stone lists it as the most essential album of Argentine heavy metal. They described it as an album that defines an era, and the ultimate album of the most influential band in the country.

== Track listing ==
| No. | Title | Lyrics | Music | Length |
|---|---|---|---|---|
| 1. | "Robo Un Auto" | Ricardo Iorio | Ricardo Iorio |
| 2. | "La Revancha de America" | Ricardo Iorio | Ricardo Iorio |
| 3. | "Memoria de Siglos" | Ricardo Iorio | Ricardo Iorio |
| 4. | "Prediccion" | Ricardo Iorio | Antonio Romano |
| 5. | "Atravesando Todo Limite" | Ana Mourin | Ricardo Iorio |
| 6. | "Horizonte Perdido" | (instrumental) | Ricardo Iorio |
| 7. | "Vientos de Poder" | Ricardo Iorio | Antonio Romano |
| 8. | "Del Camionero" | Ricardo Iorio | Ricardo Iorio |
| 9. | "Gil Trabajador" | Ricardo Iorio | Ricardo Iorio |
| 10. | "Evitando El Ablande" | Ricardo Iorio | Ricardo Iorio |
| 11. | "En Las Calles de Liniers" | Ricardo Iorio | Antonio Romano |
| 12. | "De Pismanta a Bauchaceta" | (instrumental) | Ricardo Iorio |

== Personnel ==
Band

- Claudio O'Connor - lead vocals
- Antonio Romano - guitar
- Ricardo Iorio - bass guitar, vocals on "En las calles de Liniers" and intro verse on "Del Camionero"
- Claudio Strunz - drums

Others

- Martin Menzel - Recording Technician
- J. Laluz - Album Artwork

== Bibliography ==
- Blumetti, Frank; Mora, Miguel (October 1993). "Hermética: el sonido de la gente". Madhouse Extra (in Spanish) (2). Buenos Aires: Editorial Llamoso.
