= En vida =

Live album by Almafuerte
- Released: 1997
- Recorded: 1997
- Genre: Heavy metal Thrash metal Speed metal
- Label: Polygram
- Producer: Ricardo Mollo

Almafuerte chronology
Del entorno (1996)	En vida (1997)	Almafuerte (1998)

En vida is the first live album by Argentine band Almafuerte recorded and released in 1997.

== Track listing ==
1. De los pagos del tiempo
2. El pibe tigre
3. Lanzando al mundo
4. Atravesando todo límite (Cover of Hermética)
5. Desencuentro
6. 1999
7. Buitres
8. Por nacer
9. Sentir indiano
10. Mal bicho
11. De mandadores y mandados
12. Gil trabajador (Cover of Hermética)
13. Moraleja (Cover of Hermética)
14. Ayer deseo, hoy realidad (Cover of Hermética)
15. Zamba de resurrección
16. Dijo el droguero al drogador
17. Por tu suerte
18. Del más allá

== Personnel ==
- Ricardo Iorio – vocals, bass
- Claudio Marciello – guitars
- Walter Martinez – drums
