= Antonio Romano (musician) =

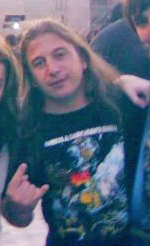
- Antonio Romano, at a 2009 concert

Background information
- Also known as: Tano Romano
- Born: August 6, 1962 (age 62); Caseros, Buenos Aires
- Genres: Thrash metal
- Instrument: Guitar
- Years active: 1984–present

Antonio Romano (born August 6, 1962) is an Argentine thrash metal guitarist. He has worked in Cerbero, Hermética, Malón, Visceral and Razones Concientes.

== Biography ==
Born in Caseros, Buenos Aires, son of Italian immigrants, Romano became a heavy metal musician after hearing an LP of Black Sabbath. He began his work in the 1980s, in a black metal band named "Cerbero". The band did not record any LP. He was considered a possible guitarist for V8 when Osvaldo Civile left that band, but he was not selected. Still, when V8's bassist Ricardo Iorio broke up the band in 1989, he hired Romano for his new band, Hermética, along with singer Claudio O'Connor and drummer Fabián Spataro. Romano composed the music of several songs of the new band. Hermética recorded three studio albums, and received a golden record for the sales of Ácido Argentino and Víctimas del Vaciamiento.

Hermética broke up in 1994, in controversial circumstances. Iorio created a new band, Almafuerte, with new musicians. Romano stayed with the other members of the band, O'Connor and Claudio Strunz (a new drummer that joined the band in 1991), and created a new band, Malón, with a similar music style. The bassist of this new band was Carlos Kuadrado, the former bassist of Cerbero. Malón recorded two studio albums. Romano commented that he considered Iorio to be better than Kuadrado writing lyrics, but praised instead Kuadrado as a bass player.

Claudio O'Connor left Malón in 1998, to begin a solo career, and the band broke up. Romano stayed with Kuadrado and called Willy Caballero, the third member of Cerbero. Still, the new band did not use the old name, and was named "Visceral" instead. It would not be a black metal band, as in the 1980s, but a thrash metal band as the recent ones of Romano. The band recorded only one of the old songs of Cerbero, "Misa Negra" (Spanish: Black mass).

Malón was reunited in 2001, without Claudio O'Connor, who was replaced by Eduardo Ezcurra. Strunz left this new incarnation of Malón shortly afterwards, and Romano stayed in it, renamed as "Razones concientes". Antonio Romano celebrated his 25 years in music in 2011 with a music festival; he clarified that he counted the years since Cerbero was an established band with regular plays. Malón was reunited in 2011, this time with all the initial members.

== Discography ==
With Hermética

- Hermética – 1989
- Intérpretes – 1990
- Ácido Argentino – 1991
- En Vivo 1993 Argentina – 1993 (live)
- Víctimas del Vaciamiento – 1994
- Lo Último – 1995
- En Concierto I&II – 1996

With Malón

- Espíritu Combativo – 1995
- Justicia o Resistencia – 1996
- Resistencia Viva – 1997
- Malón (EP) – 2002
- El regreso más esperado (DVD) – 2012

With Visceral

- Visceral – 1999
- Arrancados Del Sistema – 2000

With Razones Concientes

- Razones concientes (Demo) – 2003
- Industria Argentina – 2005
- Dejando Huella – 2007
- Razones concientes (Demo) – 2008

Solo

- 25 Años – 2011 (live) (With invited guests: Walter Meza, Pato Strunz, Larry Zavala, Willy Caballero, Guillermo Romero, Carlos Cabral, Christian Bertoncelli, Mario Ian, Juan Soto, Tito Garcia: also Tony Scotto was present)
- 30 Años (2016)
- Uno (2017)

== Bibliography ==
- Blumetti, Frank; Mora, Miguel (October 1993). Madhouse Extra (in Spanish) (2). Buenos Aires: Editorial Llamoso.
