= Hermética (album) =

- 1991 re-issue including Intérpretes EP

Studio album by Hermética
- Released: 1989
- Recorded: May–June 1989
- Studios: Estudios Sonovisión, Buenos Aires
- Genres: Heavy metal, thrash metal
- Length: 40:45 (Original); 56:13 (Re-issue 1991)
- Label: Radio Trípoli Discos
- Producer: Ricardo Iorio

Hermética chronology
Hermética (1989)	Intérpretes (1990)

Professional ratings
Review scores
Source	Rating
AllMusic	4.5/5 stars

Hermética is the self-titled debut studio album by Argentine thrash metal band Hermética. Following failed negotiations with EMI, Hermética signed with the independent label Radio Trípoli. The band recorded the album at Estudios Sonovisión and released it in November 1989. The cover art, created by Franco Médici under band leader Ricardo Iorio's direction, features symbolic imagery representing Argentine society. Aiming to replicate the international success of Brazil's Sepultura, Radio Trípoli attempted to translate Hermética's songs into English, but abandoned the idea after a testing recording.

== Background ==
V8, one of the leading bands of Argentine heavy metal, disbanded in 1987. After a pair of failed projects, bassist and leader Ricardo Iorio started a new thrash metal band, Hermética, with guitarist Antonio Romano (from Cerbero), drummer Fabián Spataro and singer Claudio O'Connor (both from Mark). Although V8's guitarist Osvaldo Civile started Horcas first, Hermética was the first band of a former member of V8 to play live. Fabián Spataro left the band a short time later, and was replaced by Tony Scotto. The first songs composed by the band were "Sepulcro Civil" ("Civil burial"), "Masa Anestesiada" ("Anesthetized mob") and "Cráneo Candente" ("Glowing skull").

The band toured across the Greater Buenos Aires for a couple of years, and decided to release an album a pair of years later. However, the final years of the presidency of Raúl Alfonsín saw a severe economic crisis, caused by rampant hyperinflation.

== Production ==
Hermética received a proposal of Luis Alacran, editor of the fanzine Rebelion Rock, to record the album independently. It would be sold at the Parque Centenario fair, and sent to buyers from distant locations by mail. Iorio rejected this proposal. He also negotiated with EMI, to no avail. Eventually he settled with Radio Trípoli, a new independent record label. The band began the recording of the album a pair of months later, at Estudios Sonovisión, and released it in November 1989. Iorio said that the band had a very short time to record the album, but could do it without problems because they had been playing the songs for a long time and were familiar with them.

The cover art was done by Franco Médici, an artist from the D'Artagnan anthology comic. Following instructions by Iorio, he made a cover that resembles oil paintings, while making subtle references to the lyrics of the songs. The cover shows a carriage carried by horses, similar to the Charon of Greek mythology. The carriage carries a military man armed with a sword, a priest giving a blessing, and a man wearing a top hat; a number of peasants are chained to the carriage and forced to follow it. The military man represents the armed forces of Argentina, the priest represents the Catholic church, and the man with the top hat the wealthy sectors of the economy.

Although Claudio O'Connor sings most songs in the album, Ricardo Iorio sings the song "Desde el oeste" ("From the west"). It was the first song that Iorio sang in an album.

The Brazilian band Sepultura signed a contract with Roadrunner Records and became an international act, beyond the Brazilian scene. Radio Trípoli attempted to emulate that success. However, Hermética made songs in Spanish, unlike Sepultura, whose songs were in English. To emulate the success of Sepultura, it would be required to record the songs in English. Ana Mourín, wife of Iorio, translated the lyrics alongside people from the label. The translations were of poor quality: for example, the opening verse of "Cráneo candente" says "esquivando patrullas", which was translated as "escaping on the patrol" rather than "dogging patrols". Besides, Claudio O'Connor had little fluency in the English language. After a testing recording of "Desterrando a los oscurantistas" in English, the results were considered a failure and the label abandoned the idea.

The band released a cover album EP the next year, Intérpretes. Phonograph records came out of use shortly afterwards, replaced by compact discs. Radio Trípoli re-issued both albums, Hermética and Intérpretes, as a single CD.

== Track listing ==
No.	Title	Lyrics	Music	Length
1.	"Cráneo Candente"	Ricardo Iorio	Antonio Romano	4:14
2.	"Masa Anestesiada"	Ricardo Iorio	Antonio Romano / Iorio	4:42
3.	"Desterrando a los Oscurantistas"	Ricardo Iorio	Ricardo Iorio	2:31
4.	"Víctimas del Vaciamiento"	Ricardo Iorio	Ricardo Iorio	3:46
5.	"Tú Eres Su Seguridad"	Ricardo Iorio	Ricardo Iorio	5:00
6.	"Sepulcro Civil"	Ricardo Iorio	Antonio Romano	2:55
7.	"Vida Impersonal"	Ricardo Iorio	Ricardo Iorio	3:22
8.	"Desde el Oeste"	Ricardo Iorio	Ricardo Iorio	3:19
9.	"Para Que No Caigas"	Ricardo Iorio	Ricardo Iorio	3:01
10.	"Deja de Robar"	Ricardo Iorio	Antonio Romano	3:11
11.	"Yo No Lo Haré"	Ricardo Iorio	Ricardo Iorio	3:54

== Personnel ==
Band

- Claudio O'Connor – lead vocals.
- Ricardo Iorio – bass guitar, vocals on ″Vida Impersonal″, ″Desde El Oeste″ and "Yo No Lo Haré".
- Antonio Romano – guitar.
- Tony Scotto – drums.

Others

- Nestor "Pajaro" Randazzo – sound engineer
- Cristian Jeroncic – assistant
- Marcelo Tommy Moya – management
- Franco Medici – artwork

== Bibliography ==
- Blumetti, Frank; Mora, Miguel (October 1993). "Hermética: el sonido de la gente". Madhouse Extra (in Spanish) (2). Buenos Aires: Editorial Llamoso.
