= Siglo XX =

Siglo XX (Spanish for "Twentieth Century") may refer to:

- Siglo XX (band), Belgian band
- Siglo XX Cambalache, Argentine television program
- Siglo XX mine, tin mine in Bolivia
