= Almafuerte (album) =

Studio album by Almafuerte
- Released: 1998
- Recorded: 1998
- Genre: Heavy metal
- Length: 40:04
- Label: Polygram
- Producer: Ricardo Mollo

Almafuerte chronology
En Vida (1997)	Almafuerte (1998)	Profeta en su tierra (1998)

Almafuerte is the third studio album by heavy metal band Almafuerte released in 1998. The album contains several covers of Ricardo Iorio former band Hermética.

== Track listing ==
All lyrics by Ricardo Iorio. Music by Claudio Marciello.

1. Mano Brava- [Brave Hand]
2. Almafuerte
3. Triunfo - [Triumph]
4. Sé vos - [Be Yourself]
5. Niño jefe - [Boss Kid]
6. Memoria de siglos - [Memory of Centuries]
7. Ser humano junto a los míos - [Be Human With Mines]
8. Desde el oeste - [From The West]
9. Del más allá - [From Beyond]
10. Tu eres su seguridad - [You're His Security]
11. Ceibo

== Personnel ==
- Ricardo Iorio - Vocals/Bass
- Claudio Marciello - Guitars
- Walter Martinez - Drums
