= Trillando la fina =

Studio album by Almafuerte
- Released: 2012
- Recorded: 2012
- Genres: Hard rock, folk, heavy metal
- Label: Dejesu

Almafuerte chronology
En Vivo En Obras 2008 (2009)	Trillando la fina (2012)

Trillando la fina is the eighth and final studio album by Argentine hard rock and heavy metal band Almafuerte released in 2012.

== Track listing ==
All lyrics by Ricardo Iorio. Music composed by Claudio Marciello.

1. Muere, monstruo muere
2. Trillando la fina
3. Pa' Pelusa
4. Si Me Ves Volver
5. Pa'l Recuerdo
6. Ciudad de Rosario
7. Mi Credo
8. La Llaga (metal version)
9. Glifosateando
10. Mamuil Mapu
11. Caballo Negro (instrumental)

== Personnel ==
- Ricardo Iorio - Vocals
- Claudio Marciello - Guitars
- Adrián Valencia - Drums
- Roberto Ceriotti - Bass
