= Lethal (Argentine band) =

Argentine thrash metal band

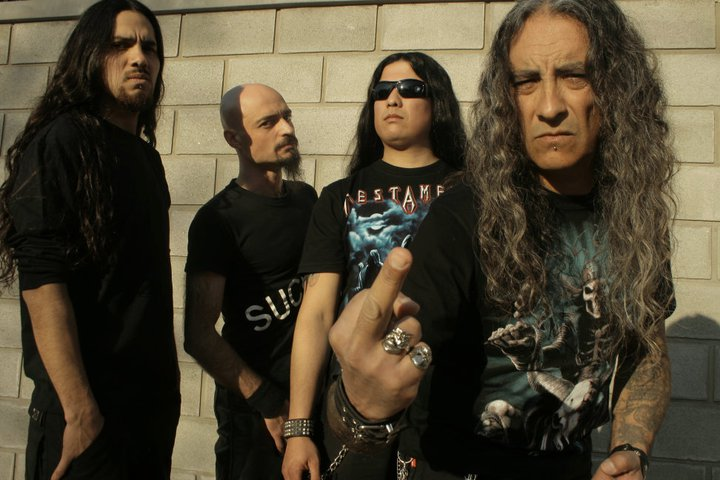

Background information
- Origin: Buenos Aires, Argentina
- Genre: Thrash metal
- Years active: 1988–2000; 2007–present
- Label: Roadrunner Records
- Members: Tito García (voice); Ramón Lopez (guitar); Eddie Walker (bass); Sergio Gomez (drums)

Lethal is an Argentine thrash metal band founded in 1988 by members of the band Legión.

== History ==
The group formed in Villa Martelli, Buenos Aires in 1988 as a traditional heavy metal band that switched to thrash metal. Their debut album was Bienvenidos a mi reino in 1990, recorded almost entirely in English and including the track "King of the Ring". The song was elected the best Argentine song of the year in a Madhouse magazine survey.

In 1993, the band released a live album in Lisandro Olmos prison, the disc Radio Olmos, along with some Argentine bands, such as Hermética, Pilsen, Attaque 77, Massacre and A.N.I.M.A.L., as well as the British U.K. Subs. They also played as an opening act for Sepultura, Pantera and Anthrax

They released two hit albums, "Maza" and "Efecto Tequila". Their original guitarist, Charly Guillén, left the band in 1996 and died of HIV/AIDS on that same year. The band took a break and in 1999, released their fifth album, entitled "Lethal 5.0", which was not widely publicized, so the band announced their separation a year later.

In 2007, the band reformed and later released their sixth studio material, titled "Inyección Lethal" with a new lineup in 2010. In 2015, they released their seventh album called "Hasta la muerte".. In 2021, their guitarist, Lucas Bravo, featured as a guest on 1917's album 'Omnicrisis'.

== Discography ==
=== Studio albums ===
- 1990: Bienvenidos a mi reino
- 1992: Warriors
- 1994: Maza
- 1996: Efecto tequila
- 1999: Lethal 5.0
- 2010: Inyección Lethal
- 2015: Hasta la muerte
- 2023: Somos thrash

=== Live albums ===
- 1993: Radio Olmos
- 2012: En vivo a través de los años (DVD)
- 2024: En vivo... a través de los años
- 2026: Vivo somos thrash

== See also ==
- Argentine heavy metal
