= Metal (magazine) =

Argentine heavy metal music magazine

- 1994 issue, after the breakup of Hermética.
- Editor: Hebe Blanco
- Categories: Heavy metal
- Frequency: By-monthly
- Publisher: Magendra
- First issue: 1984
- Final issue: 1995
- Country: Argentina
- Based in: Buenos Aires
- Language: Spanish

Metal was an Argentine heavy metal music magazine edited from 1984 to 1995.

It was published by Magendra, which also published the Pelo magazine, devoted to mainstream rock and pop. Metal was the first heavy metal magazine published in Argentina.

The initial interviews were taken from foreign magazines, but years later they got their own ones with correspondents, or by telephone interviews. The magazine started as a black and white publication with a few pages in color. More color pages were included as years went by.

Metal also released an LP/cassette compilation in 1990 with songs of Argentine bands of the time: Pappo & Widowmaker, Horcas, Lethal, El Dragón, JAF, Hermética, Kamikaze, Alakrán, Tarzen, 2112, and El Reloj.

Another heavy metal music magazine published since 1989, Madhouse, had a greater success. Metal was discontinued in 1995.
