= Intérpretes =

EP by Hermética
- Released: 1990
- Recorded: October 1990
- Studios: Estudios Aguilar, Buenos Aires
- Genres: Heavy metal, thrash metal
- Length: 17:21
- Label: Radio Trípoli Discos
- Producer: Ricardo Iorio

Hermética chronology
Hermética (1989)	Intérpretes (1990)	Ácido Argentino (1991)

Intérpretes is an E.P. released in 1990 by heavy metal band Hermética. It is an album of covers, including songs from artists like Motörhead, V8 and Manal, among others.

== Production ==
Intérpretes is the second work produced by Hermética after the 1989 Hermética album. At that point, the label Trípoli Discos could provide only 27 hours of recording time. The band accepted the proposal. Lacking new songs, the band recorded a cover album. Bassist Ricardo Iorio commented that they were not really interested in receiving royalties and thus had no problems in recording covers.

One of the songs is a thrash metal version of the tango Cambalache. Iorio commented that the lyrics of the song, written in the 1930s, were still evident and close to the lyrics of Hermética. He also played the song as an homage to Enrique Santos Discépolo, a tango artist who influenced him, and pointed out that the song is well known in neighbouring countries.

The band recorded as well "Destrucción" and "Ideando la fuga", two songs of V8, Iorio's previous band. Iorio commented that he does not like the songs as V8 recorded them because the albums (Luchando por el Metal and Un Paso Mas En La Batalla, respectively) had a weak production. He recorded them in Intérpretes because he considered that Hermética could play them better. Both songs were already included in the band's regular set of songs.

The album had similarities with the contemporary Metallica's cover album The $5.98 E.P. – Garage Days Re-Revisited. Iorio pointed out that he was a fan of Budgie when he was aged 11 and saw with great pride that a prominent heavy metal band played one of their songs. The band also included a cover of Motörhead's song No Class. It was the only English song recorded by Hermética.

== Track listing ==
No.	Title	Writer(s)	Length
1.	"Vencedores vencidos (Patricio Rey y sus Redonditos de Ricota)"	Skay Beilinson, Indio Solari	2:40
2.	"Ideando la fuga (V8)"	Ricardo Iorio, Osvaldo Civile, Alberto Zamarbide, Gustavo Rowek	2:53
3.	"Cambalache"	Enrique Santos Discépolo	2:34
4.	"Destrucción (V8)"	Ricardo Iorio, Osvaldo Civile, Alberto Zamarbide, Gustavo Rowek	2:11
5.	"No Class (Motörhead)"	Eddie Clarke, Lemmy Kilmister, Phil Taylor	2:10
6.	"Porque hoy nací (Manal)"	Javier Martínez	4:56
Total length:			17:24

== Personnel ==
Band

- Claudio O'Connor – vocals
- Ricardo Iorio – bass, vocals on "Cambalache"
- Antonio Romano – guitars
- Tony Scotto – drums

,Others

- Nestor "Pajaro" Randazzo – sound engineer
- Cristian Jeroncic & Ricki – assistants
- Sergio Assabi – photography
- Gustavo Deferrari – executive producer
- Walter Kolm & Sergio Fasanelli – general producers
- Marcelo Tommy Moya – management
- Martin Gimeno – press/promotion
