= Santos Vega (1971 film) =

- Directed by: Carlos Borcosque Jr.
- Written by: Ricardo Gutiérrez (novel); Rafael Obligado (poem); Arturo Pillado Mathew
- Starring: José Larralde; Ana María Picchio; Walter Vidarte
- Cinematography: Julio Duplaquet
- Edited by: Gerardo Rinaldi
- Release date: 22 July 1971
- Running time: 85 minutes
- Country: Argentina
- Language: Spanish

Santos Vega is a 1971 Argentine historical film directed by Carlos Borcosque Jr. and starring José Larralde, Ana María Picchio and Walter Vidarte. It was the fourth film to be based on the story of Santos Vega.

== Cast ==
- José Larralde as Santos Vega
- Ana María Picchio
- Walter Vidarte
- Juan Carlos Galván
- Carlos Carella
- Néstor Paternostro
- Romualdo Quiroga
- Chela Jordán

== Bibliography ==
- Plazaola, Luis Trelles. South American Cinema. La Editorial, UPR, 1989.
