= Polideportivo Municipal de San Rafael =

Sports arena in Argentina

Coordinates: 40.71033°N 4.18594°W

Polideportivo Municipal de San Rafael is an indoor arena in San Rafael, Mendoza, Argentina. It is primarily used for basketball and is one of the home arenas of the Obras Sanitarias along with Estadio Obras Sanitarias. It holds 1,500 people.
