= Carlos Borcosque Jr. =

Argentine film director and screenplay writer

- Born: 13 June 1943; Argentina
- Died: 22 May 2023 (aged 79)
- Occupations: Film Director, and Screenplay Writer, producer

Carlos Borcosque Jr. (June 13, 1943 - May 22, 2023) was an Argentine film director, screenplay writer and producer.

He was the son of director Carlos Borcosque. He was co-owner of the production company Primer Plano. Bosque Jr. co-directed his first picture La gran felicidad with Carlos Borsani in 1966. In 1971, at the age of 28, he produced and directed Santos Vega (1971). Shot in March-April 1971, it was pre-released in the city of Bragado. It has been cited as a heritage film due to its theme of national identity.

Borcosque Jr. died on 22 May 2023.

== Filmography ==
=== Director ===
- Dulces noches de Buenos Aires (2014).
- Argentina es tango (1988).
- Las esclavas (1987).
- Los gatos (prostitución de alto nivel) (1985).
- Crucero de placer (1980).
- …Y mañana serán hombres (1979).
- El soltero (1977).
- Santos Vega (1971).
- La gran felicidad (1966).

=== Screenwriter ===
- Las esclavas (1987).
- Los gatos (Prostitución de alto nivel) (1985).
- Voy a hablar de la esperanza (1980).
- …Y mañana serán hombres (1979).
- La colimba no es la guerra (1972).
