= Del entorno =

Studio album by Almafuerte
- Released: 1996
- Recorded: 1996
- Studio: Estudios del Abasto al Pasto, Buenos Aires
- Genre: Heavy metal
- Label: DBN
- Producer: Flavio Cianciarulo

Almafuerte chronology
Mundo guanaco (1995)	Del entorno (1996)	En vida (1997)

Del entorno is the second studio album by heavy metal band Almafuerte, released in 1996 by DBN.

== Tracks ==
All lyrics by Ricardo Iorio.

1. Del entorno - [From the Environment]
2. Lucero del alba - [Morning Star]
3. Hacia el abismo - [To the Abyss]
4. Por nacer - [To Be Born]
5. Amistades de tierra adentro - [Friends From Inland]
6. Los delirios del defacto - [Delusions of the "De Facto"]
7. 1999
8. De la carne - [About the Meat]
9. Hombre peste - [Pest Man]
10. Rubén Patagonia
11. Presa fácil - [Easy Prey]

== Personnel ==
- Ricardo Iorio - vocals, bass
- Claudio Marciello - guitars
- Claudio Cardacci - drums
- Flavio Cianciarulo - producer
