= Malón (band) =

Argentine thrash metal band

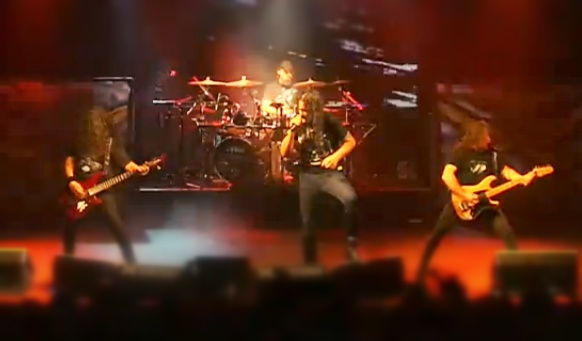

Background information
- Origin: Buenos Aires, Argentina
- Genres: Thrash metal, groove metal
- Years active: 1995–1999, 2001–2002, 2011–present
- Labels: EMI (1995–1996)
- Members: Antonio Romano; Javier Rubio; Karlos Cuadrado; Claudio O'Connor
- Past members: Eduardo Ezcurra; Claudio Strunz
- Website: maloncombativo.com

Malón is a thrash metal band from Argentina that was formed in 1995 by Claudio O'Connor, Antonio Romano, Claudio Strunz (all ex-Hermética members), and Karlos Cuadrado.

== History ==
=== 1995–1998: Early years and first albums ===
Various internal conflicts led to the dissolution of Hermética in late of 1994. Claudio O'Connor, Antonio Romano and Claudio Strunz created Malón, with bassist Karlos Cuadrado. They played their first gig at Cemento. Meanwhile, Ricardo Iorio, the fourth member of Hermética, formed the band Almafuerte, which has a sharp rivalry with Malón.

In 1995, the band released their first studio album, Espíritu combativo ("Combative Spirit"). They released their second album, Justicia o resistencia ("Justice or Resistance"), a year later. In October 1997, the band played at the 20th Anniversary of Madres de Plaza de Mayo, in Ferrocarril Oeste Stadium, with León Gieco, Divididos, Las Pelotas, La Renga, Los Piojos, A.N.I.M.A.L., Attaque 77, Actitud María Marta and Todos Tus Muertos, among others. By the end of that year they published their first live album Resistencia viva ("'Live Resistance'").

In early 1998, the band split-up, and Claudio O'Connor decided to form a side project, O'Connor, which soon becomes his main priority. Consequently, Malon played for the last time at a benefit concert in 1999, and Malón officially disbanded that year.

=== 1999–2010: Break-up, side projects and failed comeback ===
In late 2001, Antonio Romano, Claudio Strunz and Karlos Cuadrado decided to reform the band without Claudio O'Connor. Eduardo Ezcurra, who had previously sung in a band called Traición, was hired as the new singer. This line-up released a self-titled EP in April 2002. Ezcurra was chosen for having a voice very similar to O'Connor, although was disadvantaged because some fans did not accepted the band without Claudio.

After a while, Strunz decided to leave the group, taking the naming rights to the band. The remaining members formed a new band: Razones Concientes, and once again, Malón dissolved.

=== 2011–present: Return and new albums ===
In 2011, O'Connor and Romano announced their return to scene. Their first official reunion concert was on 18 December 2011 in Arena Malvinas Argentinas, Buenos Aires. It was filmed for the release of their first concert video, the DVD album El regreso más esperado ("The most expected return"). However, Malon had given an unofficial reunion concert years before, as the opening act for Megadeth. They also did a national and international tour, which included Arena Queens, New York. Malon released a new album in 2013.

In September 2015, Malón announced the new album: Nuevo Orden Mundial. Also, the band's 20th Anniversary Tour began on 11 October, at the Luna Park Stadium.

== Members ==
- Antonio Romano – guitars (1995–1998, 2001–2002, 2011–present)
- Karlos Cuadrado – bass (1995–1998, 2001–2002, 2011–present)
- Claudio O'Connor – vocals (1995–1998, 2011–present)
- Javier Rubio – drums (2021–present)

=== Past members ===
- Eduardo Ezcurra – vocals (2001–2002)
- Claudio Strunz – drums, percussion (1995–1998, 2001–2002, 2011–2021)

== Discography ==
- Espíritu Combativo (1995)
- Justicia o Resistencia (1996)
- Resistencia Viva (1997, live)
- El EP (2002)
- El Regreso más Esperado (2012, live)
- Malón 360 (2013, live)
- Nuevo Orden Mundial (2015)
- Oscuro Plan del Poder (2023)
