= Claudio Strunz =

Argentine thrash metal drummer (1966–2026)

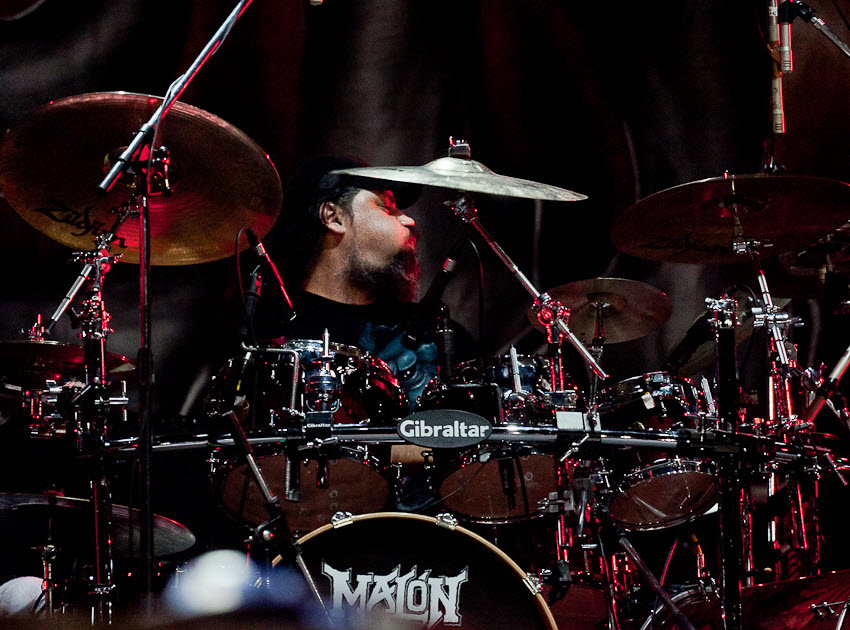
- Strunz in 2012

Background information
- Also known as: Pato
- Born: Claudio Marcelo Zurita; 11 November 1966; La Tablada, Argentina
- Died: 20 July 2026 (aged 59)
- Genre: Thrash metal
- Instrument: Drummer
- Years active: 1991–2026

Claudio Marcelo Zurita (11 November 1966 – 20 July 2026), known as Claudio Strunz, was an Argentine thrash metal drummer. He worked in Heinkel, Hermética, Malón and Simbiosis.

== Life and career ==
Claudio Strunz, born in La Tablada, began his career in Heinkel, a band that would be renamed Jeriko. The band's rehearsal room was located in the Belgrano neighbourhood, which was very distant, so he created a new one at his home. El Reloj hired this rehearsal room as well. He created later a new one in Mataderos, which was hired by the thrash metal band Hermética. He played with that band during tests when the drummer Tony Scotto was absent. As a result, when Scotto left the band Strunz was selected as the new drummer. He joined the band in 1991, just in time for the recording of the LP Ácido Argentino, and stayed with the band since then. Hermética received a golden record for the sales of Ácido Argentino, and a second one for the 1994 CD Víctimas del Vaciamiento.

Hermética broke up in 1994, in controversial circumstances. Bassist Ricardo Iorio created a new band, Almafuerte, with new musicians. Strunz, guitarist Antonio Romano and singer Claudio O'Connor, the remaining members of the band, created the band Malón with a new bassist, Carlos Kuadrado. The new band had a thrash metal style similar to Hermética. They recorded two studio CDs and one live CD. Strunz made a guest appearance in the song "Ardiendo en el cielo" of "Tierra Violada", the first CD of Jeriko. He was the producer of the CD, as well as with their second CD, "Tensiones".

Malón broke up in 1998, after the departure of O'Connor. Strunz created the grunge band Simbiosis, which had little success. With his previous experience, he created "Asbury Park", a complex of rehearsal rooms. He tried to reunite Malón with Romano and Kuadrado; O'Connor refused to join them. The band broke up again, and Strunz claimed the copyright over the name of the band, forbidding it to continue without him. The band reunited again in 2011, this time with all the original members.

Strunz died on 20 July 2026, at the age of 59.

== Discography ==
=== With Hermética ===
- Ácido Argentino – 1991
- En Vivo 1993 Argentina – 1993 (live)
- Víctimas del Vaciamiento – 1994
- Lo Último – 1995 (live)
- En Concierto I & II – 1996 (live)

=== With Malón ===
- Espíritu Combativo – 1995
- Justicia O Resistencia – 1996
- Resistencia Viva – 1997 (live)
- El regreso más esperado – 2012 (live)
- Nuevo Orden Mundial - 2015

=== With Simbiosis ===
- Riesgo Y Reacción
- Neo Adicción

== Bibliography ==
- Blumetti, Frank; Mora, Miguel (October 1993). Madhouse Extra (in Spanish) (2). Buenos Aires: Editorial Llamoso.
