= Ultimando =

Sixth studio album by Almafuerte

Studio album by Almafuerte
- Released: 2003
- Recorded: 2003
- Genres: Heavy metal, folk, rock
- Label: Dejesu

Almafuerte chronology
En Vivo En Obras (2001)	Ultimando (2003)	10 Años (2005)

Ultimando is the sixth studio album by Argentine metal band Almafuerte recorded in 2003 and released the same year by Dejesu Records. The album saw injured frontman Ricardo Iorio give up bass playing duties to Roberto Ceriotti.

== Tracks ==
1. "Patria al hombro" [Homeland on Shoulder]- 3:43
2. "Ultranza"- 2:43
3. "Todo es en vano, si no hay amor" [All Is In Vain If There Is No Love]- 3:34
4. "Con rumbo al abra"- 4:32 [On The Way to The Valley
5. "Ruta 76" [Route 76]- 3:55
6. "Del fumador" [From The Smoker]- 2:52
7. "En este viaje" [In This Trip]- 4:43
8. "Yo traigo la semilla" [I Bring The Seed]- 4:01
9. "T.C."- 2:34
10. "Sojuzgados y sometidos" [Subjugated And Subjected]- 3:29
11. "Como estaba ahí Dios" [As It Was There God]- 3:11

== Members ==
- Ricardo Iorio - vocals
- Claudio Marciello - guitars
- Roberto Ceriotti - bass
- Adrian "Bin" Valencia - drums
