= Hermética =

Argentine heavy metal band

Background information
- Origin: San Martín, Buenos Aires Province, Argentina
- Genres: Thrash metal, heavy metal
- Years active: 1987–1994
- Label: Radio Trípoli Discos
- Spinoffs: Almafuerte; Malón
- Spinoff of: V8
- Past members: Ricardo Iorio; Antonio Romano; Claudio O'Connor; Claudio Strunz; Fabián Spataro; Antonio Scotto

Hermética was an Argentine thrash metal and heavy metal band from San Martín, Buenos Aires. It was formed by bassist Ricardo Iorio in 1987 after his previous band, V8, disbanded. Hermética was signed to independent record label Radio Trípoli Discos throughout their career. The band's initial lineup consisted of Iorio, vocalist Claudio O'Connor, drummer Fabián Spataro and guitarist Antonio Romano. Spataro left the band in 1988 and was replaced with Antonio Scotto. This lineup recorded their eponymous album, the first thrash metal album recorded in Argentina. At that point, Hermética performed mainly in Argentina, except for one concert in Uruguay. In 1990, they released the EP Intérpretes, which included covers of Argentine rock and tango songs. Both albums were released by Radio Trípoli Discos as a single CD when digital technology became available.

Scotto left the band in 1991 and was replaced with drummer Claudio Strunz. This lineup recorded the band's second studio album, Ácido Argentino. Hermética opened for Black Sabbath and Motörhead during their visits to Argentina, but cancelled their headlining tour of Paraguay. They recorded the live album En vivo 1993 Argentina, and played at a penal facility. They participated in the first Argentine Monsters of Rock festival, which featured Black Sabbath, Slayer, and Kiss. Their last studio album, Víctimas del Vaciamiento, was released in 1994. To promote the album, the group performed at the Obras Sanitarias stadium later that year.

Hermética disbanded at the end of 1994, a few days before their second concert in Obras. Ricardo Iorio, who performed lead vocals on a number of tracks, formed a new band, Almafuerte, and served as its vocalist. The remaining ex-members of Hermética hired a new bassist and created the band Malón. Both bands began a rivalry.

== History ==
=== Early years and Hermética (1987–1989) ===
Ricardo Iorio was the frontman and bassist of the band V8, which broke up in 1987. After its disbandment, Iorio formed Hermética, which had a similar musical style to V8. Initially, he tried to work with Martín Knye, a former member of Kamikaze, but after two meetings, the idea was abandoned. Iorio then appointed the guitarist Antonio Romano from the band Cerbero, who had been previously considered for V8. Iorio wanted Romano to be both a vocalist and bassist, but his manager Marcelo Tommy persuaded Iorio to hire someone else. Iorio eventually chose Claudio O'Connor for vocals and Fabián Spataro from the band Mark as drummer. They began to practice at Villa Ballester in 1987. The name of the band is a reference to hermeticism; Iorio saw similarities between the hermetic doctrine and the context of the Argentine heavy metal.

The first songs composed by Iorio were "Sepulcro Civil", "Masa Anestesiada", and "Cráneo Candente". The band's first show was in a pub called "Helloween" in San Martín, on May 7, 1988. Although Horcas had been established before Hermética by Osvaldo Civile—a fellow member of V8—Hermética was the first of the two bands to perform a live concert. Spataro left the band in 1988 because of a labor dispute. He was replaced by drummer Tony Scotto, who was introduced by friends of the band. He performed his first concert with the band in August at the "Sáenz Peña" club—where Spataro played for the last time. The fanzine Zote organized a free concert at the main plaza of Lomas de Zamora, but it was canceled because of the failed military uprising of the Carapintadas insurgents.

Hermética made regular appearances at the Arlequines theater in San Telmo in 1989. They were the first heavy metal band to play there. They performed with the bands Doppler, 666, Militia, Genocidio, Ultraje, Cross, Legión, and Devastación. Hermética wanted to record their first album but the national economic crisis had a negative impact on the project. The fanzine "Rebellion Rock" proposed an independent production, which would be sold at Parque Centenario, but the band rejected this offer. They also rejected working for EMI and instead signed for a new label, Radio Trípoli Discos. They signed a contract in May 1989, and two months later the band began to record the LP at the Sonovisión studios. The eponymous album Hermética was released in November 1989. It was the first thrash metal album to be recorded in Argentina. Ricardo Iorio made his debut as lead vocalist on the song "Desde el Oeste". Hermética performed a concert in Córdoba, with the band Hammer. Alberto Zamarbide, a former singer with V8, made a guest appearance during a concert in Mataderos. Hermética ended the year by performing two concerts with Pappo's new band Pappo & The Widowmakers.

=== Intérpretes and Ácido Argentino (1990–1992) ===
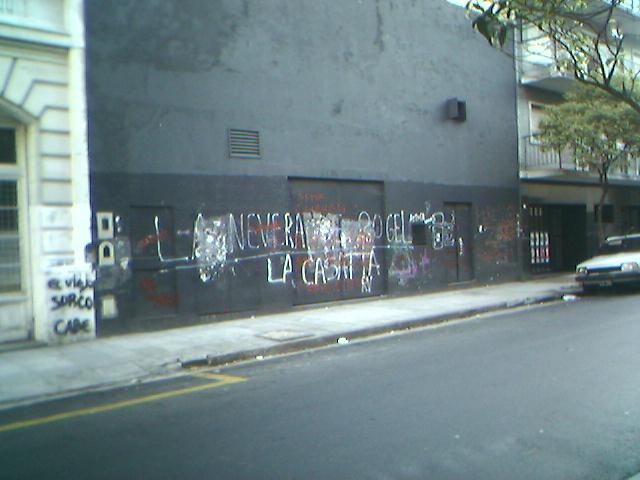
Hermética performed many concerts at Cemento.

Hermética performed their only concert outside of Argentina in the early 1990s at the "Club Platense" in Montevideo, Uruguay. They played with Retrosatán and Alvacast,—two bands from Uruguay. Hermética had to spend the night in the street because of the faulty Uruguayan production. Once they returned to Argentina, they performed at several locations in Buenos Aires and in Mar del Plata with Divididos, Los Violadores, Arácnido and Rata Blanca. They were offered a chance to record an EP with only 27 hours of recording time. They accepted the proposal, and recorded improvised cover versions of songs by V8, Patricio Rey y sus Redonditos de Ricota, Enrique Santos Discépolo, Motörhead, and Manal. Iorio, a fan of a band called Budgie, made deliberate similarities to Metallica's cover EP, The $5.98 E.P. - Garage Days Re-Revisited—which included a cover version of a song by that band. Hermética performed at the "Metal en acción" festival at the José Amalfitani Stadium, sharing the bill with 2112, Lethal, Horcas, Kamikaze, Alakran, and Riff.

The band searched for a new concert venue because the Arlequines was becoming too small for their growing audience. They moved to Cemento, where most of the 1991 concerts took place. They played with the bands Todos tus Muertos, Pobres Pibes, Nepal, Militia, Devastación, Rapier, and Resistencia Nativa. Their albums Hermética and Intérpretes—which had been released as LP records and cassettes, were released by Trípoli on a single compact disc. Tony Scotto left the band because of creative differences and was replaced by Claudio Strunz. Strunz, drummer of the band Heinkel and owner of Hermética's rehearsal room, had already played with the band during practice sessions when Scotto was absent. He made his debut at Sunchales. The band appeared in two television programs, La movida del '90 and Siglo XX Cambalache and recorded their second full-length album, Ácido Argentino, with 150 hours of recording time at the Aguilar studios. It was released at Cemento on December 27.

Following an avalanche at San Carlos Minas in January 1992, Hermética joined a charity music festival held at the Chateau Carreras stadium. Hermética played only a few songs at a concert with Riff—the headline band—, which ended with minor riots. Hermética were the opening act for Black Sabbath at Obras Sanitarias; Black Sabbath's frontman Ronnie James Dio thanked the band for playing with them. The band leased 25% of the copyright of their songs to Daniel Grinbank, the businessman who brought rock bands to Argentina to play with Black Sabbath. In October 1992, they were the supporting band for Motörhead in Obras. They were offered a concert in Paraguay, but once in the country the show's producers tried to pay less money than had been agreed. Unable to find an alternative location, the band refused to play and returned to Argentina.

=== Live albums and Víctimas del Vaciamiento (1993–1994) ===
Hermética toured Patagonia at the beginning of 1993. In March that year, Ácido Argentino was certified gold by the Argentine Chamber of Phonograms and Videograms Producers (CAPIF), having shipped 30,000 copies in Argentina. Trípoli invited them to produce a new studio album in Miami or Los Angeles but the band refused, preferring to stay in Argentina. Hermética was scheduled to support Megadeth, but their guitarist/vocalist Dave Mustaine had health problems which forced the band to cancel the concert. They received proposals to play with Metallica, but rejected the required terms of the contract. After touring in Rosario and Greater Buenos Aires, Hermética performed their first concert in Buenos Aires on May 15, 1993, at Stadium, a new concert hall with a capacity of 5,000. They recorded the live album En vivo 1993 Argentina and a home video. The album included a heavy metal cover version of "Si se calla el cantor", a song first recorded by folk singer José Larralde. This album ended the contract with Radio Trípoli, which was renewed. Hermética performed at the Olmos penal facility on August 17, along with Lethal, A.N.I.M.A.L., Massacre, Attaque 77, Pilsen and the British U.K. Subs. The concert was presented by the radio host Norberto Verea, and was recorded and released on a live CD named "Radio Olmos". The band performed another concert at Stadium on September 4, and began to produce their third studio album.

Hermética was part of the 1994 edition of the Monsters of Rock festival in Buenos Aires, alongside Black Sabbath, Slayer, and Kiss. Shortly after, they released their third studio album, Víctimas del Vaciamiento. As the Stadium's hall was not big enough to accommodate the audience, they held a concert at Estadio Obras Sanitarias. Hermética recorded their performance and released it as a live album titled Lo último. Meanwhile, their newest studio album received gold certification. The band recorded a cover version of a folk song, "De los pagos del tiempo", also by Larralde. The band had received proposals to play at Obras the previous year, which the accepted with the condition that they would organize it themselves.

=== Disbandment ===
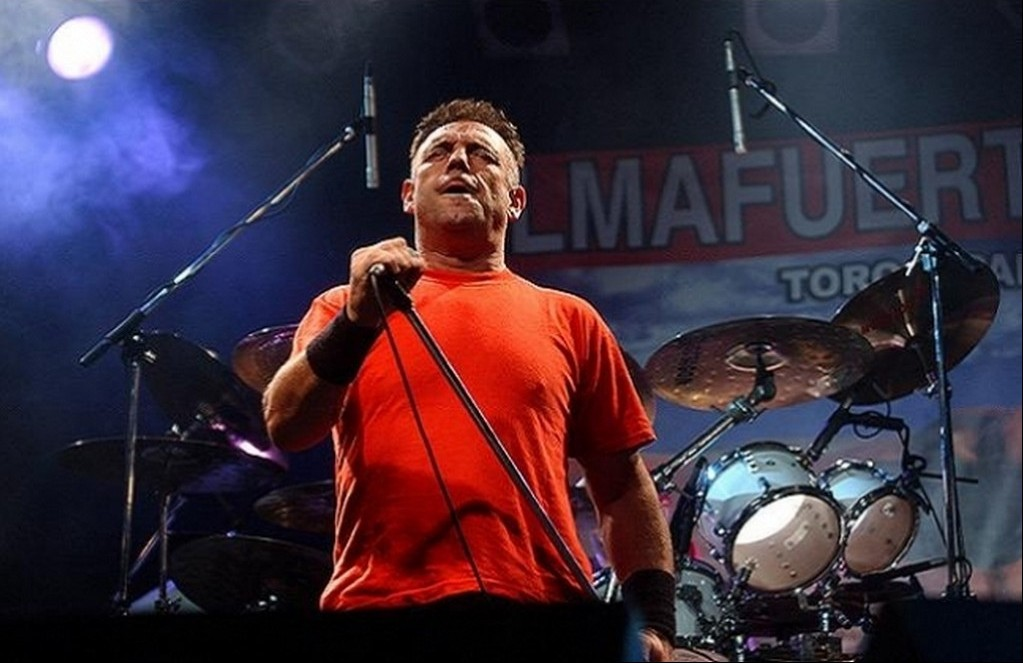
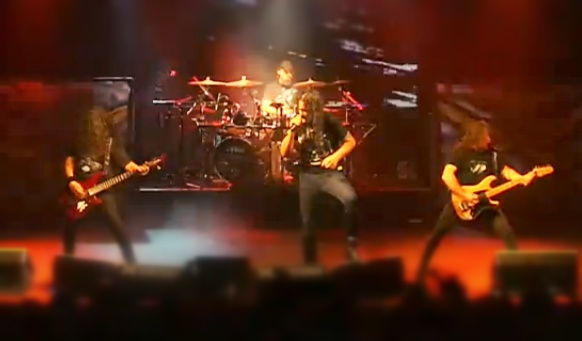
Almafuerte (above) and Malón (below)

Hermética's last concert was held in Mar del Plata. Their second concert in Obras was canceled; rumors that Iorio had contracted hepatitis B turned out to be false. The other members sent him a formal request to attend the concert but Iorio refused and the band broke up. Iorio did not attend any meeting since then and ordered the other band members to stop using the name Hermética, which Iorio had invented. Iorio gave his first interviews after the break-up to the Clarín newspaper and the other members to the music magazine Madhouse. Iorio said that the band had always been united, but few weeks before their final concert, the members were not talking to each other. He said he had lied about having hepatitis B, expecting to end the hostilities, but it did not work. Iorio flew from Mar del Plata to Buenos Aires to avoid seeing the other members, who returned by bus. O'Connor, Romano, and Strunz stated in Madhouse magazine that the harsh relation was because Iorio had not consulted the others about the decisions he was making, that he received most of the money, and that he avoided meeting them when they were discussing the problems in the band.

The concert in Obras was filmed and released as a live album. The first edition was released under the name Lo Último with a black front-cover; it was edited in studio to match the quality of a regular studio CD. It was later reissued as a double album titled "En Concierto"; this version was not edited in the studio and reinstated the raw sound of the band's live performance.

Ricardo Iorio started a new band, Almafuerte, with guitarist Claudio Marciello and drummer Claudio Cardacci. Iorio took lead vocal duties and included covers of Hermética and V8 songs in his new band's repertoire. O'Connor, Romano, and Strunz hired a new bassist, Karlos Cuadrado, and formed the band Malón. The bands became rivals; Hermética's popularity was inherited by both bands. A 1995 poll among readers of Madhouse was led by members or works of both bands in all national categories.

Hermética remained a popular band in the Argentine heavy metal scene, even among the younger fans who had never seen the band live. Since their disbandment, the band's members have not attempted any reunion. At the 2011 reunion of Malón, Claudio O'Connor said that their personal conflicts with Iorio would not allow it and that they would not reunite the band if the four members do not have a good personal relationship.

In 2019, O'Connor, Romano, Cuadrado and Strunz created the band La H no murió ("The H is not dead", named after a common fandom expression about Hermética), a Hermética cover band. It played many concerts around the country, and even in Paraguay. In 2021 Strunz quit the band, being replaced by Javier Rubio. In this way, they continued performing live, eventually opening for Iron Maiden in Buenos Aires in October 2026.

== Style and lyrics ==
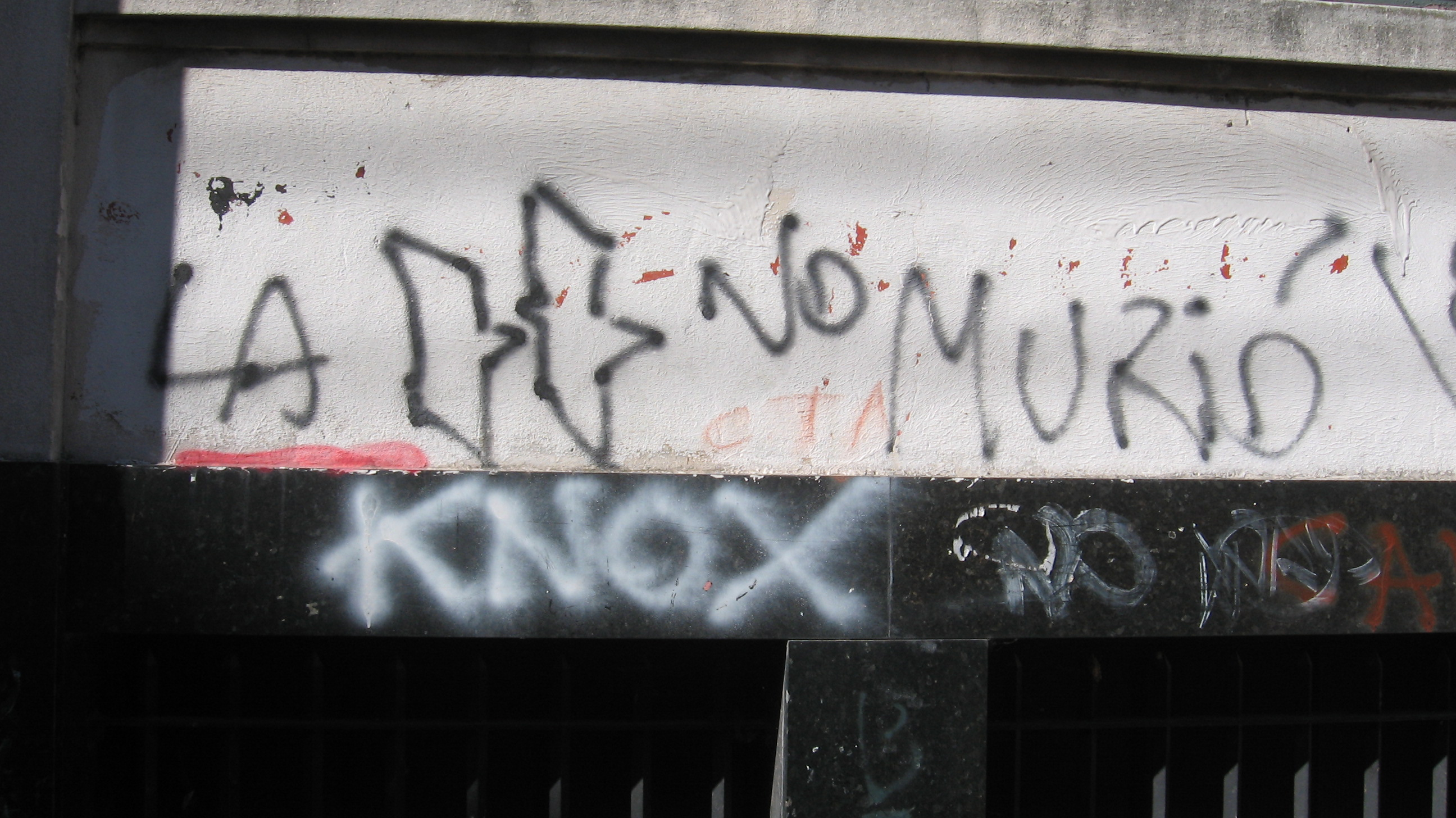
Graffiti in Buenos Aires, which reads "La H no murió" (Spanish: "The H is not dead").

Hermética was a thrash metal and heavy metal band, drawing influences from Motörhead, Megadeth, and Black Sabbath. Their music was composed primarily by bassist Ricardo Iorio with occasional input from guitarist Antonio Romano. The band used a counterpoint between the singing styles of their two vocalists; lead singer Claudio O'Connor's vocals were high pitched, while Iorio had a raucous style of singing. Iorio sang segments of some songs but rarely performed songs in their entirety. Iorio thought that his singing style in Hermética was inferior to his later work with Almafuerte because the songs had not been composed specifically for him. The success of Hermética's second studio album Ácido Argentino allowed the band to increase the budget for the production of its follow-up, Víctimas del Vaciamiento. Iorio proposed re-recording the band's first album with drummer Claudio Strunz and a higher budget, but the label refused his proposal.

His songs have been covered by artists of other styles such as Leo García, Jauría or Ramanegra Dúo.

The musical style of Hermética was considered to be old-fashioned until their last studio album, which adopted a more modern approach. The band achieved success as a result of their introspective lyrics. Unlike most heavy metal bands, Hermética's music was appealing to poor people. Iorio wrote about his thoughts and concerns from a personal perspective. He stated that some of his lyrics were inspired by 1940s Argentine tango music. Their music was influenced by Argentine nationalism, family values and neighbourhood-centered localism. Iorio said that he does not support racism or fascism. The lyrics, except for covers, were always written in Spanish because Iorio does not approve of artists who write in English to gain foreign audience. The first two albums addressed a variety of topics; the track "Memoria de siglos" ("Memory of centuries") references the cult of personality, buck passing, peace through strength, and wage slavery. Each song from their third album is devoted to a different subject.

== Members ==
=== Last line-up ===
- Ricardo Iorio - bass guitar, occasional vocalist (1987–1994)
- Antonio Romano - guitar (1987–1994)
- Claudio O'Connor - lead vocals (1987–1994)
- Claudio Strunz - drums (1991–1994)

=== Former members ===
- Fabián Spataro - drums (1987–1988)
- Antonio Scotto - drums (1988–1991)

== Discography ==
=== Studio albums ===
- Hermética (1989)
- Ácido Argentino (1991)
- Víctimas del Vaciamiento (1994)

=== EPs ===
- Intérpretes (1990)

=== Live albums ===
- En vivo 1993 Argentina (1993)
- Lo último (1995)
- En Concierto, Parte I & II (1995)

=== Videos ===
- En vivo 1993 Argentina (1993)

=== Compilation albums ===
- Sentimiento argentino (Mexican comp. 1998)

== Bibliography ==
- Blumetti, Frank; Mora, Miguel (October 1993). "Hermética: el sonido de la gente". Madhouse Extra (in Spanish) (2). Buenos Aires: Editorial Llamoso.
- Hernandez, Deborah Pacini (2004). Rockin' Las Américas. United States: University of Pittsburgh Press. ISBN 0-8229-4226-7.
