= Ricardo Iorio =

Argentine heavy metal musician (1962–2023)

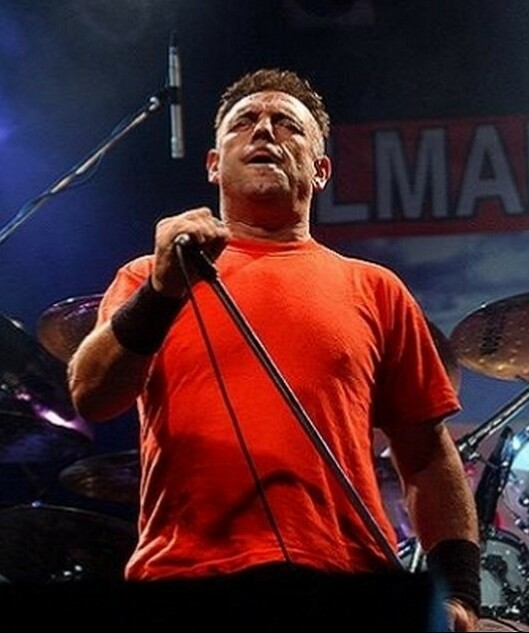
- Iorio in 2011

Background information
- Born: Ricardo Horacio Iorio; 25 June 1962; Ciudadela, Buenos Aires, Argentina
- Died: 24 October 2023 (aged 61) Coronel Suárez, Argentina
- Genres: Heavy metal
- Occupations: Singer; musician; songwriter
- Instruments: Vocals; bass guitar
- Formerly of: V8; Hermética; Almafuerte

Ricardo Horacio Iorio (25 June 1962 – 24 October 2023) was an Argentine heavy metal singer and bassist. He was one of the founders of V8 (1979–1987) and later founded the band Hermética (1988–1994). He was the singer and main composer for Almafuerte from 1995 until its dissolution in 2016. His songs were urban stories dealing with the life of the lower classes, as well as Argentine "metalheads". Even though he played bass with every band he formed, he chose Beto Ceriotti to be the new bassist of Almafuerte, remaining as the singer and main lyricist of the band.

A nationalist, Iorio continuously proclaimed in his songs and in the media his pride in being Argentine and in Argentine history, and mixed native music styles such as tango, Indian and gaucho culture with the heavy metal base of Almafuerte.

== Early life ==
Ricardo Iorio was born on 25 June 1962 in Ciudadela, Buenos Aires. His parents were Alfredo Iorio, son of Italian immigrants from Sicily, and Elda Pedraza, of Tehuelche ancestry. He lived during his infancy in Caseros, Buenos Aires. He helped his father with his work in a greengrocery.

While still young he was shocked by the sight of a biker with the aspects of heavy metal fashion, including long hair and a leather jacket. At that point, he decided that he wanted to be like that man, joining the heavy metal subculture. The term "heavy metal", however, was not used at the time; the genre was still known as "heavy rock". He also attended rehearsals of the band El Reloj and got his first bass by the end of the 1970s.

== V8 ==
Ricardo Iorio and Ricardo "el Chofa" Moreno met at age 16, in 1978 during a screening of the film "The Song Remains the Same" featuring Led Zeppelin. After starting two short-lived bands, Alarma and Comunión Humana, they started the group V8. Some of their first songs were "Voy a enloquecer", "Si puedes vencer al temor" and "Muy cansado estoy".

The band announced its final concert alongside the bands WC, Ácido Nítrico, 6L6, and La Máquina Infernal. The members of all those bands met at the house of Alberto Zamarbide, singer of WC, to organize it. He became friends with both Ricardos, as well as Gustavo Rowek, drummer of WC. Zamarbide and Rowek broke up with WC after that concert and moved to V8 instead. Ricardo Moreno left V8 after being diagnosed with asthma, and proposed Osvaldo Civile as his replacement. Civile was in the band Té de Brujas by then and had also attended that concert as a fan. This started V8's most famous line-up: Iorio, Civile, Zamarbide, and Rowek.

Zamarbide was also a friend of Pappo, a famous rock guitarist at the time. Pappo, leader of Riff, was trying to replicate the New wave of British heavy metal in Argentina and helped the bands V8 and Violadores. V8 was included in the B.A. Rock festival in 1982 as a result of his demands. Their concert led to violent clashes with the hippies in the audience.

The band recorded the acclaimed "Luchando por el metal" and "Un paso más en la batalla", but had several internal problems from that point on. There were several member changes, and by the time of the last LP "El fin de los inicuos" all the members of the band except Iorio had embraced evangelism. Iorio felt that V8 was no longer his band, and it broke up in 1987.

== Hermética ==
After the breakup of V8, Iorio did a couple of rehearsals with Martin Kyne from Kamikaze, but got nowhere. Finally, he formed the group Hermética with vocalist Claudio O'Connor, drummer Fabián Spataro and guitarist Antonio Romano. The name of the band is a reference to hermeticism; Iorio saw similarities between the hermetic doctrine and the context of the Argentine heavy metal.

Their first show was in Centro Cultural Recoleta. Shortly after that show, Fabián Spataro left the band and was replaced by Tony Scotto. In 1989 they recorded their self-titled debut album, Hermética, through the new label Radio Trípoli. It was the first thrash metal long play recorded in Argentina.

The band got a proposal to record an EP with just 27 hours of recording time. They accepted and recorded a rushed cover album, Intérpretes. The following full album, Ácido argentino, was certified gold, and the band played for Motörhead and Black Sabbath (with Ronnie James Dio) during their respective concerts in the country.

The band's popularity grew from its inception, despite not having songs on radio or any really important broadcasting exposure. In 1993 they recorded the live album "En Vivo 1993 Argentina" at Stadium, and in 1994 they took part in the festival Monsters of Rock at the Estadio Monumental alongside Slayer, Kiss and Black Sabbath (with Tony Martin). In the presentation of their third album, "Víctimas del vaciamiento" (which was also certified Gold), they filled the Estadio Obras Sanitarias and recorded a live album.

However, the band unexpectedly broke up at the end of 1994. Iorio argued that relations with the other band members had deteriorated, while others declared exhaustion from not being consulted on the organizational aspects of the band.

== Almafuerte ==
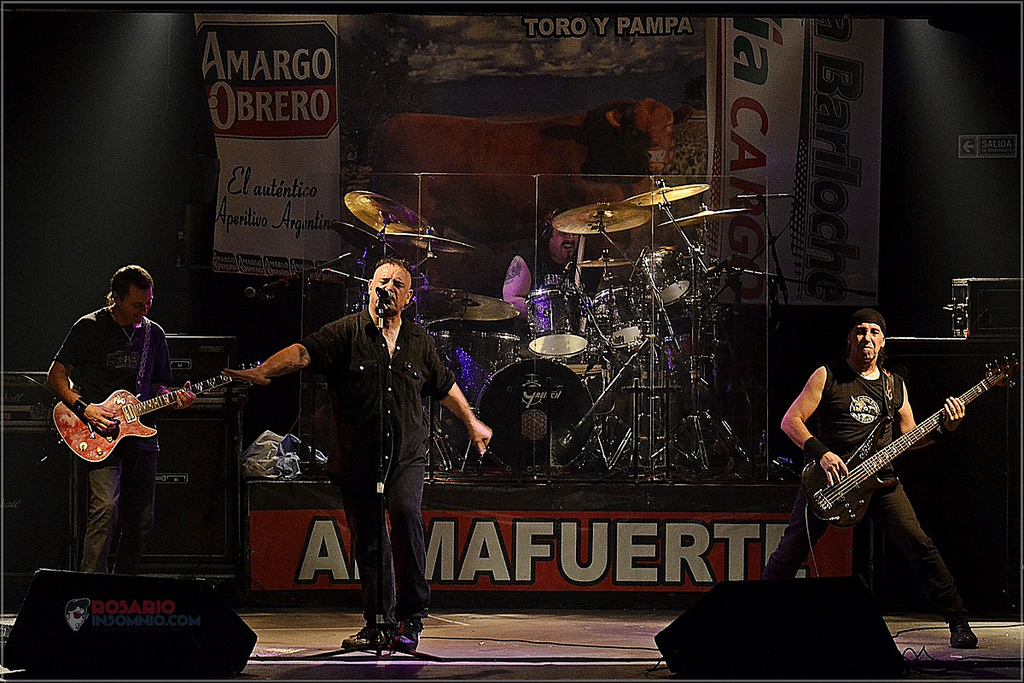
Almafuerte playing live, 2012

After the disbanding of Hermética Iorio formed the band Almafuerte with Claudio Cardacci and Claudio Marciello. Iorio began to sing their songs as a regular frontman. His former colleagues formed Malón, with whom Iorio began a fierce rivalry.

Their first album, "Mundo Guanaco" was released before Malón's first, and had several covers. "Desencuentro" by Cátulo Castillo, a tango transformed into Heavy Metal, "De los pagos del tiempo" by José Larralde (presented by Hermética at the Obras Sanitarias Stadium), and V8's "Voy a enloquecer" with the original name and lyrics. Iorio also filmed the first video clip of his career, for the song "El Pibe Tigre".

The bands with former members of V8, Horcas, Logos and Rata Blanca, played together in the Metal Rock Festival, which ended with a reunion of the band. The bass was played by Miguel Roldán, who was part of V8 but as a guitarist. Almafuerte had been invited to participate but Iorio refused, contending that his current band was better.

Iorio left the city of Buenos Aires to live in the countryside, in the city of Coronel Suárez in the Buenos Aires Province. "Trillando la fina" was the last album of Almafuerte, and he only made sporadic works and concerts as a solo artist after that. He recorded four cover albums, with a variety of genres and artists.

== Death ==
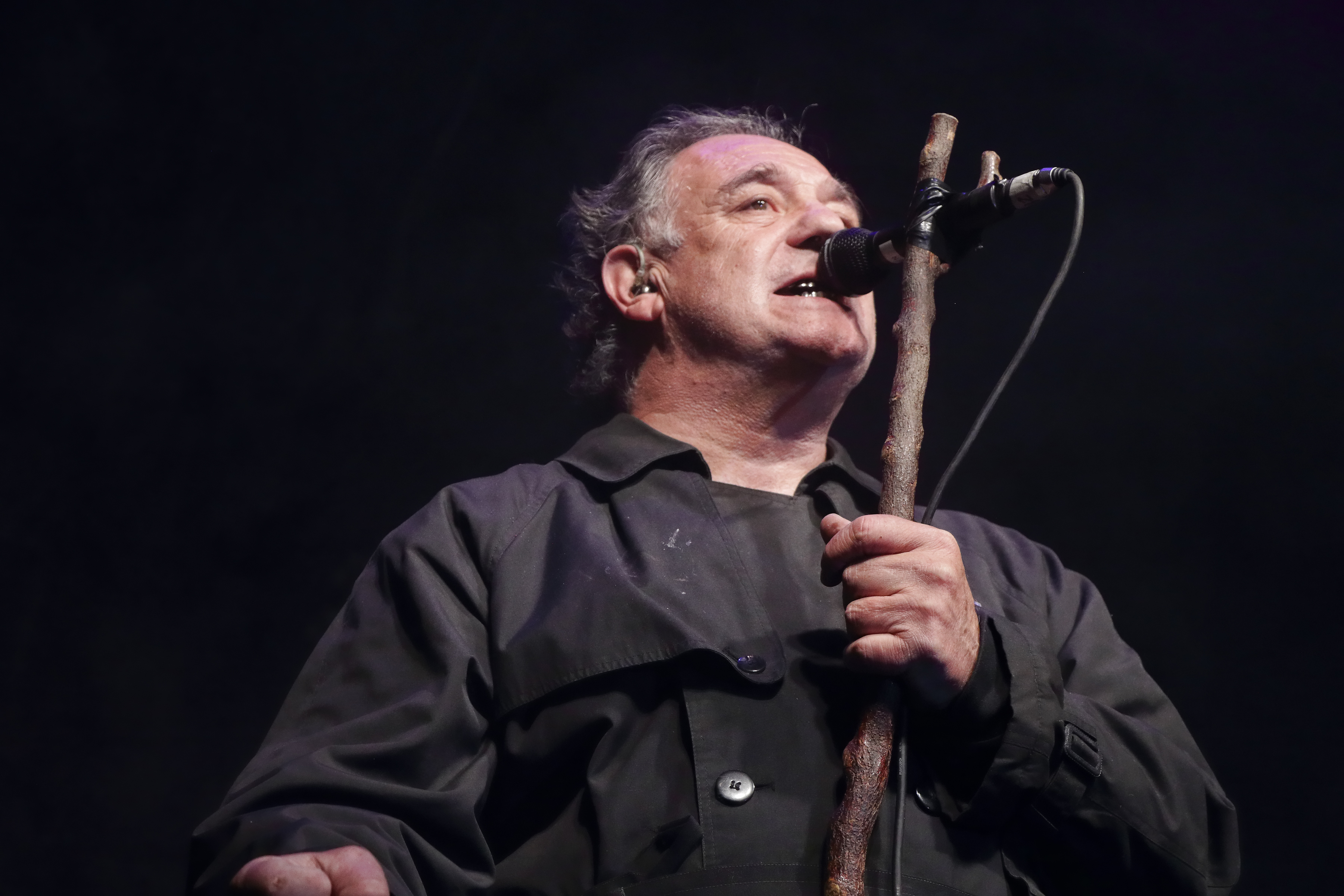
Iorio in 2022, a year before his death

Ricardo Iorio died on 24 October 2023, at the age of 61. He felt pain in his chest and called for an ambulance, but died on the way, being declared dead when he arrived at the hospital. He had no previous known health problems. The autopsy confirmed that he died of massive heart attack. The funeral was held at the Cooperativa Eléctrica San José in San José, Coronel Suárez Partido.

== Discography ==
Album	Band/Project	Year	Recording
Luchando por el Metal	V8	1983	Studio
Un Paso Más en la Batalla	V8	1985	Studio
El Fin de los Inicuos	V8	1986	Studio
Hermética	Hermética	1989	Studio
Intérpretes	Hermética	1990	EP (Covers)
Acido Argentino	Hermética	1991	Studio
En Vivo 1993 Argentina	Hermética	1993	Live
Víctimas del Vaciamiento	Hermética	1994	Studio
Lo Último	Hermética	1995	Live
Mundo Guanaco	Almafuerte	1995	Studio
Del Entorno	Almafuerte	1996	Studio
Peso Argento	Iorio & Flavio	1997	Studio
Almafuerte	Almafuerte	1998	Studio
A Fondo Blanco	Almafuerte	1999	Studio
Piedra Libre	Almafuerte	2001	Studio
Ultimando	Almafuerte	2003	Studio
10 Años	Almafuerte	2005	Live
Toro y Pampa	Almafuerte	2006	Studio
Ayer Deseo, Hoy Realidad	Ricardo Iorio	2008	Studio (Covers)
Trillando la Fina	Almafuerte	2012	Studio
Atesorando en los Cielos	Ricardo Iorio	2015	Studio (Covers)

== Sources ==
- Blumetti, Frank; Mora, Miguel (October 1993). "Hermética: el sonido de la gente". Madhouse Extra (in Spanish) (2). Buenos Aires: Editorial Llamoso.
