= Siglo XX Cambalache =

Siglo XX Cambalache is an Argentine television programme, which aired from 1991 to 1996 on Telefe. The name is part of the lyrics of the tango "Cambalache". It was hosted by Fernando Bravo and Teté Coustarot, who made interviews to several people. It had nineteen rating points.
