= Claudio O'Connor =

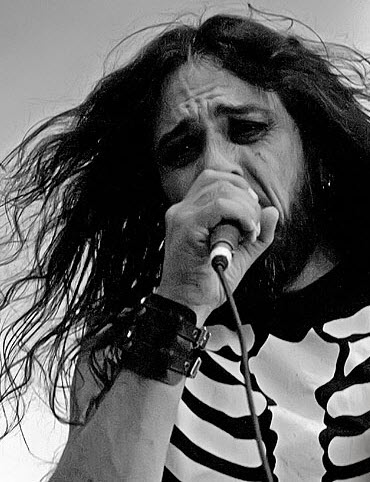
- O'Connor in 2011

Background information
- Also known as: "O'Connor"
- Born: Claudio Alberto Castro; April 28, 1963 (age 63); Llavallol, Gran Buenos Aires, Argentina
- Genres: Heavy metal, thrash metal, groove metal
- Occupation: Singer
- Instrument: Voice
- Years active: 1984–present
- Member of: O'Connor; Malón
- Formerly of: Hermética

Claudio Alberto Castro, also known as Claudio O'Connor (born April 28, 1963 in Llavallol, Buenos Aires Province) is a thrash metal, groove metal and hard rock vocalist from Argentina. He is lead singer of the bands O'Connor and Malón, and was also formerly the lead singer of Hermética.

== Biography ==
=== Mark I ===
Claudio O'Connor started in the music in 1984. He was recommended by Walter Almada, Horse Power bassist. When O'Connor joins the band as vocalist, it's renamed to Mark I. The band performed over 30 shows until its dissolution in 1987. They recorded two demos, one with two tracks ("Una Farsa Más" and "Traidor") and other with 4 ("El traidor", "(Esto es) Mark", "Tierra marginal" y "Las tablas de la ley").

=== Hermética ===
Shortly after, Fabián Spataro (former drummer of Mark I) joined the new musical project of Ricardo Iorio. Spataro insists to Iorio to try Claudio O'Connor as singer. They decided not to continue using the name of V8 band, and Iorio founded along with Antonio Romano, Spataro and O'Connor, Hermética. Shortly after, Spataro left the band for personal reasons and was replaced by Tony Scotto. In 1989 they release debut album, Hermética, through the newly formed label Radio Trípoli. After, they records the EP Intérpretes in 1990. Scotto is replaced by Claudio Strunz, and released the albums Ácido Argentino in 1991 and Víctimas del Vaciamiento in 1994.

Claudio O'Connor remained in the band throughout its existence (1988–1994), as lead singer. While Iorio was a singer and bassist, Antonio Romano was guitarist, and Claudio Strunz, Tony Scotto and Fabián Spataro were drummers.

=== Malón ===
Hermética is dissolved due to internal conflicts. As result, three of the four members (O'Connor, Romano and Strunz) meet to form with Karlos Cuadrado, the thrash metal band, Malón. In contrast, Iorio formed Almafuerte. During his career, Malón recorded two studio albums: Espíritu Combativo (1995) and Justicia o Resistencia (1996), besides Resistencia Viva, a live album.

In the early 1998, Claudio O'Connor decides to form a parallel project, creating O'Connor, along with Hernán García.

=== O'Connor ===
Within a few months, for several reasons, Claudio decides to quit Malón and devote himself to his new band, which experiments with heavy rock from the 70s. In turn, the other remaining Malón members formed parallel bands. O'Connor and García, with different line up's, recorded the albums Hay Un Lugar (1999), Yerba Mala Nunca Muere (2000), Dolorización (2002), El Tiempo Es Tan Pequeño (2004), Estamos Pariendo (2006), Naturaleza Muerta (2008), Río Extraño (2010), Un lugar que nunca muere, volumes 1 & 2 (2011), Un poco de respeto (2012) and La grieta (2016).

=== Malon's return ===
In 2011, Claudio and Romano announced the return of the original line up of Malón, with their first show scheduled for December 18 of the same year, at the Arena Malvinas Argentinas of Buenos Aires, which was recorded and released on a DVD called El Regreso Más Esperado ("The Most Expected Return") in 2012. Later on, they released the studio albums titled Nuevo orden mundial (2015) and, following Strunz's departure in 2021 and the addition of Javier Rubio in his place, Oscuro plan del poder (2023).

=== La H No Murió ===
In 2019, O'Connor, Romano, Cuadrado and Strunz formed the band La H no murió ("The H is not dead", named after a common fandom expression about Hermética), a Hermética tribute project with which they toured extensively performing Hermética's classic songs. In 2021 Strunz quit both Malón and La H No Murió, being replaced by Javier Rubio in both projects. In this way, they continued performing live, eventually opening for Iron Maiden in Buenos Aires in October 2026.

== Discography ==
Album	Band/Project	Year	Recording
Demo Uno	Mark I	1988	Demo
Demo Dos	Mark I	1988	Demo
Hermetica	Hermética	1989	Studio
Intérpretes	Hermética	1990	Studio EP
Ácido Argentino	Hermética	1991	Studio
En Vivo 1993 Argentina	Hermética	1993	Live
Víctimas del Vaciamiento	Hermética	1994	Studio
Lo Ultimo	Hermética	1995	Live
En Concierto I & II	Hermética	1995	Live
Espíritu Combativo	Malón	1995	Studio
Justicia o Resistencia	Malón	1996	Studio
Resistencia Viva	Malón	1997	Live
Hay Un Lugar	O'Connor	1999	Studio
Yerba Mala Nunca Muere	O'Connor	2000	Studio
El EP	Malón	2002	Studio EP
Dolorización	O'Connor	2002	Studio
Vive Siempre	O'Connor	2003	Live
El Tiempo Es Tan Pequeño	O'Connor	2004	Studio
Estamos Pariendo	O'Connor	2006	Studio
Naturaleza Muerta	O'Connor	2008	Studio
La Década Tour 1998–2008	O'Connor	2009	Live + DVD
Río Extraño	O'Connor	2010	Studio
Un Lugar Que Nunca Muere Vol I & II	O'Connor	2011	Studio re-recordings
Un Poco De Respeto	O'Connor	2012	Studio
El Regreso Más Esperado	Malón	2012	Live + DVD
Malón 360	Malón	2013	Live + DVD
Nuevo orden mundial	Malón	2015	Studio
La grieta	O'Connor	2016	Studio
Oscuro plan del poder	Malón	2023	Studio
