= Pedro Bonifacio Palacios =

Argentine poet (1854–1917)

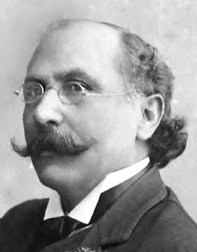
- Born: May 13, 1854; San Justo, Argentina
- Died: February 28, 1917; La Plata, Argentina
- Other names: Almafuerte
- Occupations: Poet, teacher, writer, translator, journalist

Pedro Bonifacio Palacios (13 May 1854 – 28 February 1917), better known by his sobriquet Almafuerte (Spanish for "strong soul"), was an Argentine poet.

== Biography ==
Palacios was born in San Justo, a western suburb of Buenos Aires, into a humble family. As a boy he lost his mother and was abandoned by his father, and because of this was raised by his relatives.

His first career was as a painter, but, because the government denied him a grant to travel to Europe, he changed direction and dedicated himself to writing and teaching. At 16 years of age, he was appointed director of a school in then-rural Chacabuco.

After meeting former President Domingo Faustino Sarmiento in 1884, he was dismissed as school director for not possessing a teaching degree, though this was arguably because his poems were highly critical of the government. He was, however, elected to the Buenos Aires Province Chamber of Deputies, and later worked as a librarian and translator for the Provincial Statistical Bureau. In 1887, he moved to La Plata and was taken in as a journalist at the newspaper El Pueblo.

He became the first President of the Civic Union Committee which was founded in 1890.

In 1894 he renewed his teaching activities at a school near Trenque Lauquen, but two years later was once again withdrawn for political reasons.

At the start of the 20th century, he began participating briefly in active politics, but because of his unstable economic situation and his refusal to accept a political position, he did not do it with much enthusiasm.

At the end of his life, the Argentine National Congress granted him a pension so he could dedicate himself fully to his poetry. However, his health had deteriorated, and he died on 28 February 1917 in La Plata, capital of the Province of Buenos Aires, at the age of 63.

== Literary work ==
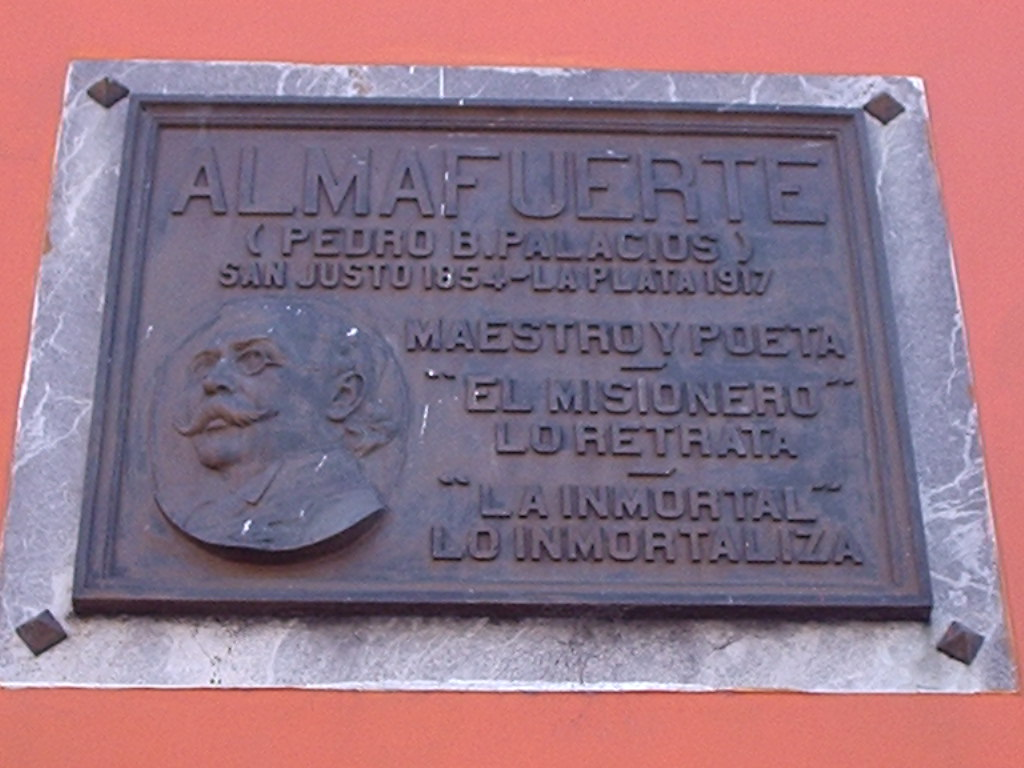
A commemorative plaque at the poet's erstwhile La Plata residence

Palacios published some works under various pseudonyms, the most well known of which was Almafuerte.

- Lamentaciones (1906)
- Evangélicas (1915)
- Poesías (1917)
- Nuevas Poesías (1918)
- Milongas clásicas, sonetos medicinales y Dios te salve. Discursos (1919)
- La inmortal
- El misionero
- Trémolo
- Cantar de los cantares
- La sombra de la patria

== See also ==
- Almafuerte, a 1949 Argentine film by Luis César Amadori dramatized the life of Palacios
