= Kamikaze (band) =

- Origin: Argentina
- Genre: Heavy metal
- Years active: 1985-Present

Kamikaze is an Argentine heavy metal band. Their first LP, No me detendrán!, was released in 1988. Their second work had low sales because of the hyperinflation that plagued the country, and the band broke up after the third album. They had a brief reunion in 2003 for a pair of concerts, and a stable reunion in 2011.

== Biography ==
The initial members of the band were the singer Enrique Gómez Yafal, the guitar player Miguel Ángel Oropeza, the bass player Gustavo Perugino and the drummer Claudio Gabriel Parolari. Their first big concert was on November 14, 1987, at the Roca theater. This concert was selected as concert of the year by a poll between the readers of the Metal magazine, defeating the last concert of V8 and the first concert of Rata Blanca. Perugino left the band, and he was replaced by Roberto Cosseddu. The band took part in the 1988 festival "Halley en Obras", along with Rata Blanca, Alakran and Juan Antonio Ferreira (JAF). The first Long Play, No me detendrán!, was released some months afterwards.

The guitar player Daniel Telis joined the band in 1989, and the band started to produce their second album. Miguel Oropeza left the band during the recording, being replaced by Martín Knye. This delayed the release of the new album, Víctima del Rock. However, the ongoing hyperinflation decreased the sales, and the records label went into bankruptcy. Parolari and Cosseddu left the band, and were replaced by Jorge Cimino and Horacio Pinasco. In 1990 they closed the festival "Metal en acción" held at José Amalfitani Stadium. They released a third album, Kamikaze 3. The band had a frequent coverage in the Metal magazine, and decreased their popularity.

The band broke up. Daniel Telis worked as session musician in Alianza, and Pinasco joined the band Humanimal. Martín Knye started a new band, Magiar. Enrique Gómez Yafal started a new band as well, but refused to use the name "Kamikaze" for it, and named it "Cuero" instead. The band, composed by Gómez Yafal, Oropeza, Cosseddu y Parolari, reunited in 2003, released again their first two albums, and made a concert at the "Hangar" music hall. They released a new album in 2011, Dueño de los cielos, with singer Roberto Fraticelli and drummer Roberto Ruiz. The band organized a tour across the country for the new CD. Gómez Yafal and Telis organized another band, KZ4. In 2018, Daniel Telis died due to a multiple myeloma that was originally diagnosed in 2009.

On 19 September 2026, Kamikaze—featuring vocalist Enrique Gómez Yafal, drummer Claudio "Patón" Cimino, bassist Horacio Pinasco, and guitarist Martín Knye—performed at El Teatrito in Buenos Aires. The show was held to celebrate the 35th anniversary of their third studio album, Kamikaze 3 (1991), featuring songs from the record alongside classic tracks from their repertoire and material from their follow-up project, KZ4.

== Discography ==
- No me detendrán! (1988)
- Víctima del rock (1989)
- Kamikaze 3 (1991)
- Dueño de los Cielos (2011)
