= Pappo =

Argentine rock musician (1950–2005)

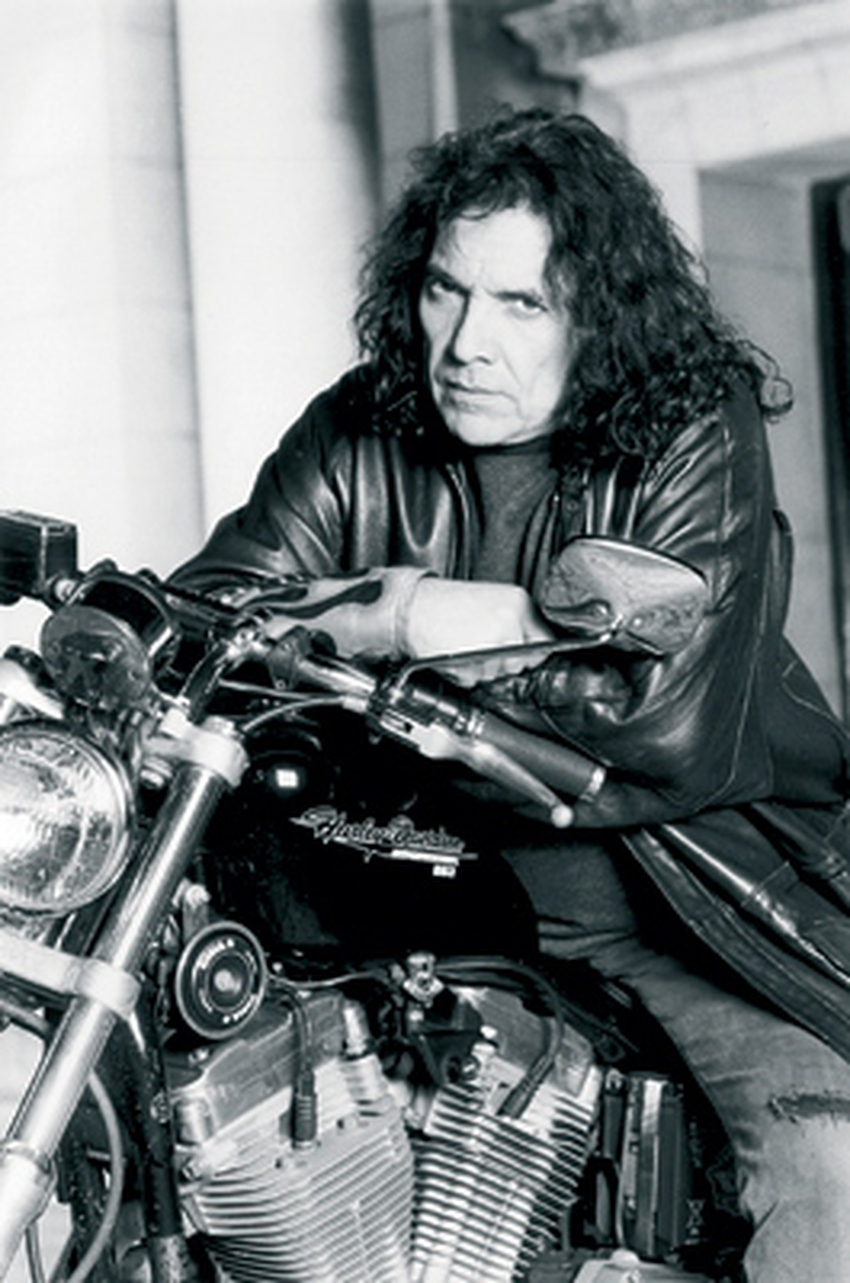
- Pappo

Background information
- Also known as: El Carpo
- Born: Norberto Aníbal Napolitano; 10 March 1950; La Paternal, Argentina
- Died: 25 February 2005 (aged 54) Luján, Buenos Aires, Argentina
- Genres: Blues rock; hard rock; heavy metal; blues; psychedelic rock
- Occupations: Musician, composer
- Instruments: Guitar, vocals
- Years active: 1967–2005
- Labels: Mandioca; Music Hall; Polydor; Sony BMG; Ariola; MCA
- Formerly of: Los Abuelos de la Nada; Engranaje; Los Gatos; Billy Bond y La Pesada del Rock and Roll; Pappo's Blues; Aeroblus; Riff; The Widowmakers
- Website: elsitiodepappo.com.ar

Norberto Aníbal Napolitano (10 March 1950 – 25 February 2005), popularly known as Pappo, was an Argentine rock musician, guitarist, singer and songwriter. One of the most influential figures in Argentine music, he was a forerunner of Argentine rock, heavy metal and blues.

He is considered by various Argentine musicians, by the public and by the specialized press as the best guitarist in the history of Argentine rock, while B. B. King considered him one of the best guitarists of all time.

He was a member of popular Argentine rock bands such as Los Abuelos de la Nada, Engranaje, Los Gatos and Billy Bond y La Pesada del Rock and Roll. He also founded the blues rock band Pappo's Blues; the hard rock band Aeroblus, in the 1970s; and the heavy metal band Riff in the 1980s. He also founded a band in the United States called The Widowmakers.

His pseudonym came from various deformations of the abbreviation of his surname, Napo. Another nickname with which he was popularly known was Carpo, alluding to the dominance he possessed when moving the carpus of his hand while playing guitar. B. B. King nicknamed him "The Cheeseman" due to a gift he received from Pappo consisting of an Argentine cheese and a red wine.

== Biography ==
Pappo was born in La Paternal, Buenos Aires. He showed interest in blues and rock 'n' roll music starting at a young age, with his early influences being The Rolling Stones, The Kinks, Freddie King, B.B. King, Jimi Hendrix, Muddy Waters, Eric Clapton, and Manal. During the late 1960s and through the 1970s, he was a pivotal part of the Argentine rock scene. Pappo started playing as an occasional guitarist for Manal but soon joined Los Abuelos de la Nada and later Los Gatos, with whom he recorded two albums in 1969 and 1970. He formed his own band, Pappo's Blues, in 1970 and released its first album in 1971. The band was also part of the 1973 rock documentary Hasta que se ponga el sol, filmed during the third edition of the B.A. Rock festival. In the 1970s, Pappo's Blues saw constant line-up changes, with Pappo being the only permanent member of the band and main songwriter.

Between 1975 and 1980, Pappo lived alternately in England and Argentina. In the United Kingdom, he made contact with new genres such as punk rock and the new wave of British heavy metal. He formed the power trio Aeroblus in 1977 with ex-Manal bassist Alejandro Medina and Brazilian drummer Castello Jr. Pappo relocated to Argentina permanently in 1980 and formed the band Riff. He also played briefly in the bands Boxer (1984), Hoy No Es Hoy (1987) and Widow Maker (1988-1989). In 1990, he appeared as a guest guitarist on Sandra Mihanovich and Celeste Carballo's album Mujer contra mujer. He revived Pappo's Blues in the 1990s, alternating the activity of this group with eventual reunions of Riff. Pappo released a solo classic blues and hard rock album called Buscando un amor in 2003, which turned out to be his last record.

== Controversies ==
In a televised interview in 1985 on the programme Noche de Brujas, journalist Alicia Barrios confronted Pappo over an attempted sexual attack when the journalist was 20 years old at Estadio Luna Park, Buenos Aires. In the duration of the interview, conducted in Spanish, Pappo admitted to semi-violacion (semi-rape) and responded that "one always has ideas of raping people as pretty as you."

== Death ==
Pappo died in February 2005 in a motorcycle accident. Tandil dedicated a monument in his honour.

== Discography ==
Pappo's discography encompasses almost four decades, from the late 1960s with Los Abuelos de la Nada and Los Gatos until his death in 2005.

=== Los Abuelos de la Nada ===
- "Diana Divaga / Tema En Flu Sobre El Planeta" (1967) - 45 rpm single
- "La Estación" (recorded 1968) - only released on compilations

=== Los Gatos ===
- Beat Nº1 (1969)
- Rock De La Mujer Perdida (1970) - (co-wrote "Invasión")

=== Pappo's Blues ===
- Pappo's Blues (1971)
- Pappo's Blues, Volumen 2 (1972)
- Pappo's Blues, Volumen 3 (1972)
- Pappo's Blues, Volumen 4 (1973)
- Triángulo (1974)
- Pappo's Blues, Volumen 6 (1975)
- Pappo's Blues, Volumen 7 (1978)
- Pappo's Blues, Volumen 8 – Caso Cerrado (1995)
- El Auto Rojo (1999)

=== Aeroblus ===
- Aeroblus (1977)

=== Patrulha do Espaço ===
- Patrulha 85 (1985)
- El Riff (1990) - reissue of Patrulha 85 with bonus tracks

=== Y Hoy No Es Hoy ===
- Plan Diabólico (1987) - released under Pappo y Hoy No Es Hoy name

=== Widow Maker ===
- Widow Maker (1989)

=== Solo ===
- "Nunca Lo Sabrán" (recorded in 1969) - only released on compilations
- Pappo en Concierto (1984) – Live album. It was originally a Boxer concert, briefly promoted as "Pappo & Boxer", and ultimately advertised and released solely under Pappo's name.
- Blues Local (1992)
- Pappo with Deacon Jones – July '93 Los Angeles (1994) - live
- Pappo Sigue Vivo (1994) - live
- Pappo y Amigos (2000)
- Buscando Un Amor (2003)
- Juanito y El Carposaurio (2021) - with Juanse
