= Estadio Obras Sanitarias =

Indoor arena in Buenos Aires, Argentina

Obras Sanitarias Arena
- Estadio Obras Sanitarias
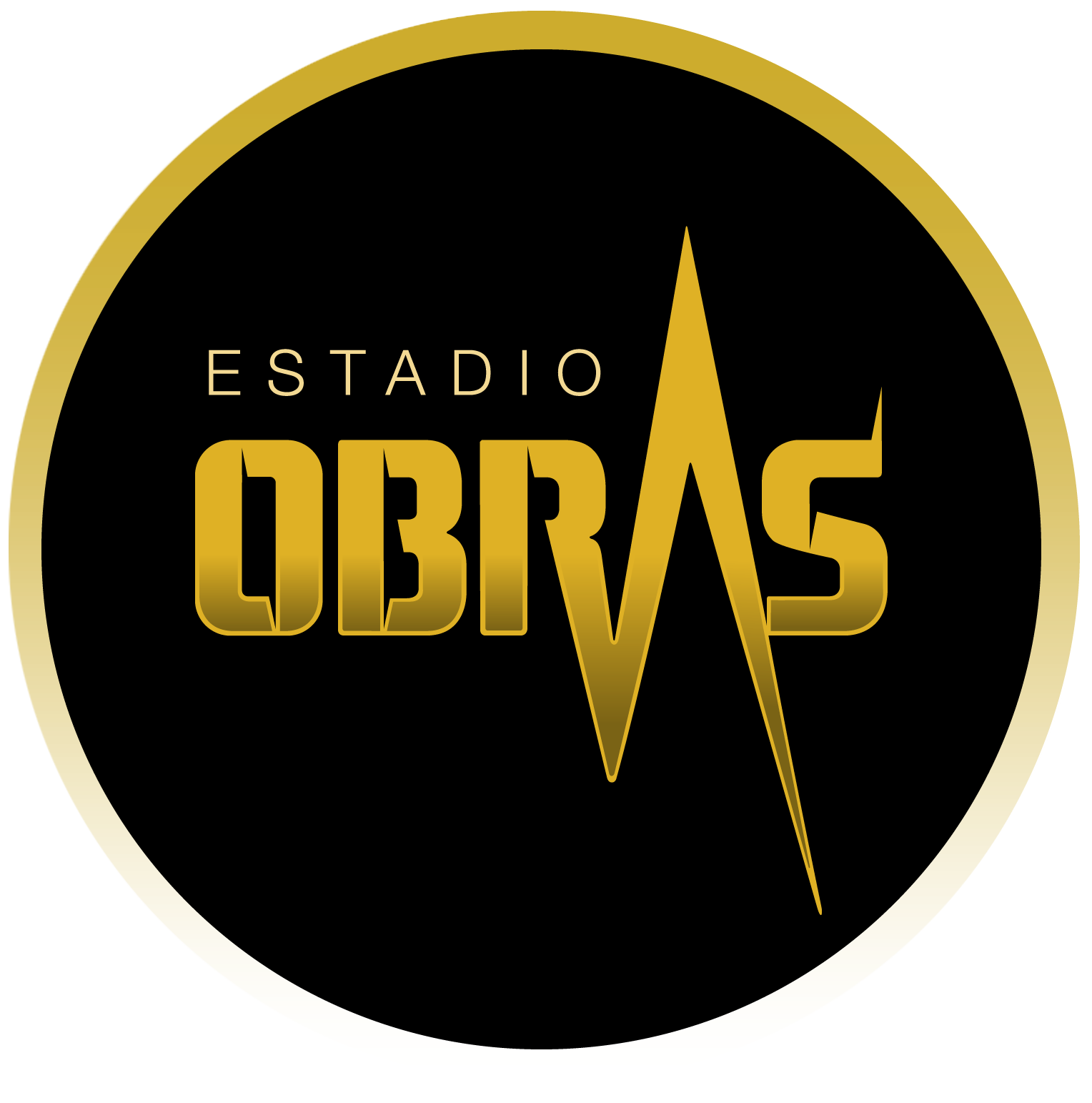

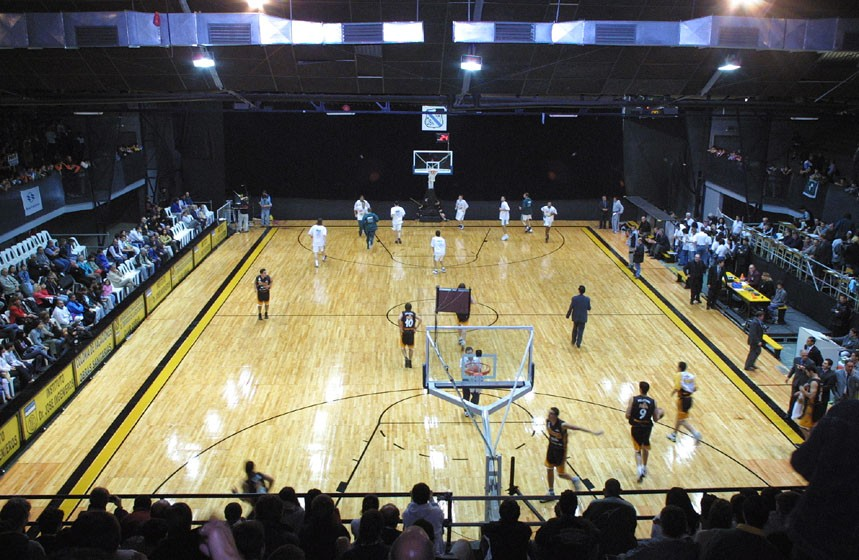
- The stadium during a basketball game in 2007
- Interactive map of Obras Sanitarias Arena
- Location: Buenos Aires, Argentina
- Coordinates: 34°32′44″S 58°27′29″W
- Owner: Club Obras Sanitarias
- Capacity: 4,700 (concerts); 3,100 (sports)
- Surface: Parquet
- Current use: Basketball; Concerts

Construction
- Opened: June 1978; 48 years ago

Tenant
- Obras Sanitarias

Website
- estadioobras.com.ar

Estadio Obras Sanitarias is an indoor arena that is located in Buenos Aires, Argentina. The arena, home venue of club Obras Sanitarias, is mainly used to host basketball games and concerts. It has a capacity of 3,100 people for basketball games, and 4,700 people for concerts.

Since its inauguration in 1978 the arena has held mostly rock music concerts so it was nicknamed the temple of rock.

== History ==
Estadio Obras Sanitarias was opened in June 1978. Over the years, the arena has been one of two home venues often used by the sports club Obras Sanitarias, with the other being the Polideportivo Municipal de San Rafael.

The arena has hosted the FIBA Intercontinental Cup tournament four times. It hosted the FIBA Intercontinental Cup's 1978 edition, the 1983 edition, in which the local club Obras Sanitarias won the title, the 1986 edition, in which Žalgiris Kaunas won the title, and also the 2021 edition.

During its history, the arena has also hosted numerous musical concerts, particularly rock concerts, which has led to the arena being given the nickname of "Templo del Rock" ("Temple of Rock"). The first band to perform there was "Banda Spinetta", leaded by Luis Alberto Spinetta, in September 1978. From 2006 to 2012, the arena had the name sponsorship of Estadio Pepsi Music (Pepsi Music Stadium), as part of a multinational marketing campaign of the Pepsi company, which sponsored rock festivals and concerts at the arena.

== Concerts held ==
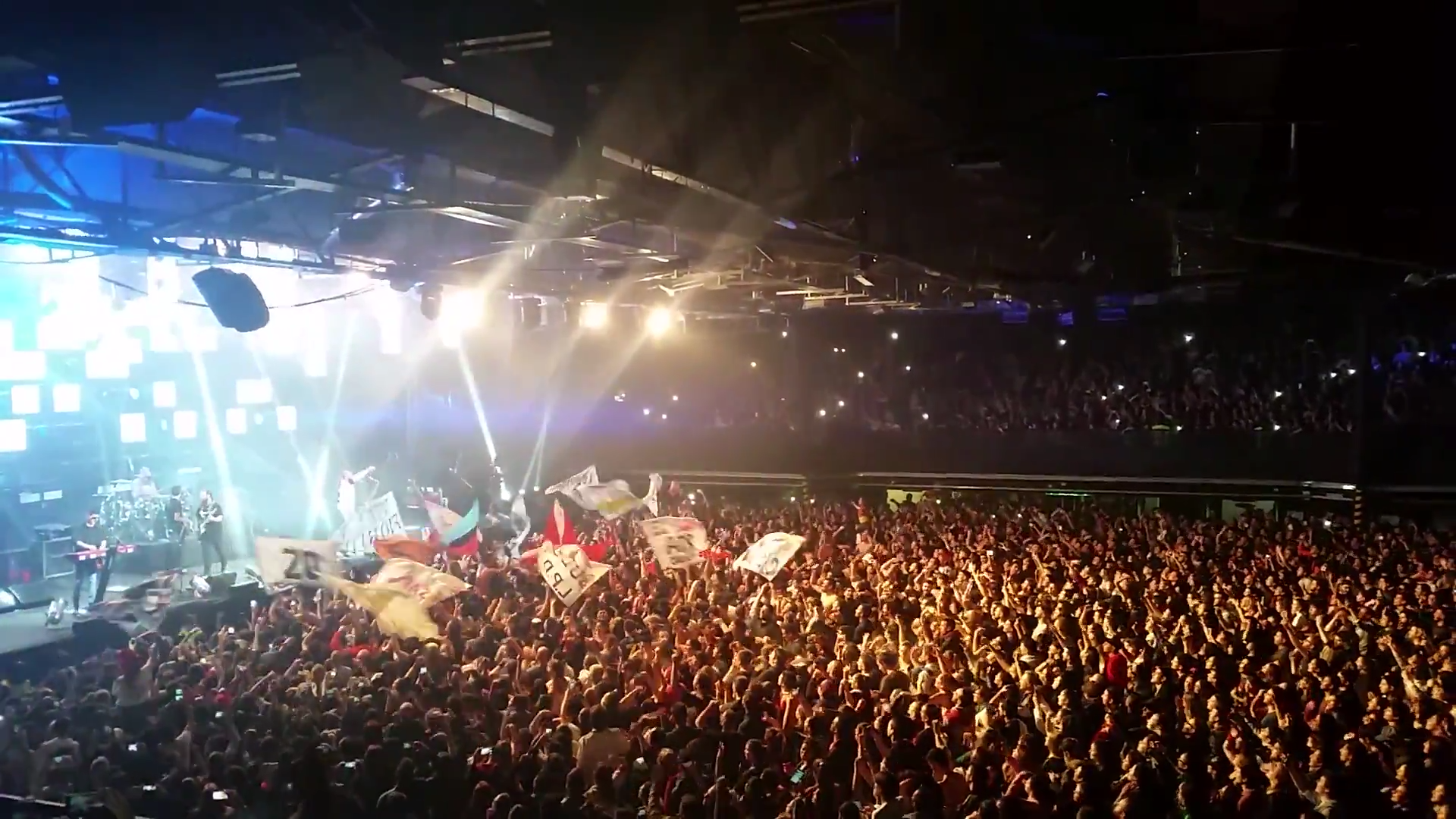
A concert at Obras Sanitarias

- Divididos
- Sumo
- Las Pelotas
- A-HA
- Iron Maiden
- The Ramones
- The Mission
- The Red Hot Chili Peppers
- Bad Religion
- Dream Theater
- Motörhead
- Duran Duran
- B.B. King
- Megadeth
- Avril Lavigne (Outdoors)
- The Sex Pistols
- Helloween
- Cypress Hill
- James Brown
- Arbol
- Miranda!
- The Bolshoi
- Velvet Revolver
- New Order
- Nightwish
- The Police
- Van Halen
- Siouxsie and the Banshees
- Gene Loves Jezebel
- Iggy Pop
- The Jesus and Mary Chain
- David Byrne
- Bob Dylan
- Faith No More
- Public Image Ltd.
- Skid Row
- Black Sabbath
- Marillion
- Emerson, Lake & Palmer
- Midnight Oil
- Toto
- Anthrax
- Rick Wakeman
- Poison
- Jethro Tull
- Scorpions
- Fight
- Pantera
- Living Colour
- Kreator
- Yes
- Die Toten Hosen
- Kiss
- Suicidal Tendencies
- Rollins Band
- Alpha Blondy
- Bryan Ferry
- The Cult
- Beastie Boys
- Body Count
- The Lurkers
- No One Is Innocent
- Slash's Snakepit
- The Toy Dolls
- Simple Minds
- Ozzy Osbourne
- Alanis Morissette
- Yngwie J. Malmsteen
- The Jason Bonham Band
- Soda Stereo
- Deep Purple
- Kraftwerk
- Creedence Clearwater Revisited
- Los Piojos
- Patricio Rey y sus Redonditos de Ricota
- Monsta X
- Winona Riders

== Live albums ==
Some of the live albums and DVDs recorded at the stadium include (in brackets, the year when the album was recorded):

- Serú Girán - No llores por mí, Argentina (1982)
- Megadeth - That One Night: Live in Buenos Aires (2005)
- KISS - Live...Buenos Aires '94 (1994)
- Hermética - Lo último (1994)
- La Renga - Bailando en una pata (1995)
- Attaque 77 - Trapos (2001)
- Bersuit Vergarabat - De la Cabeza (2001)
- Almafuerte - En Vivo Obras 2001 (2001)

Preceded by Pabellón de la Ciudad Deportiva; Madrid	FIBA Intercontinental Cup; Final Venue; 1978	Succeeded by Ginásio do Ibirapuera; São Paulo
Preceded by Maaspoort Sports and Events; Den Bosch	FIBA Intercontinental Cup; Final Venue; 1983	Succeeded by Ginásio do Ibirapuera; São Paulo
Preceded by Palau Blaugrana; Barcelona	FIBA Intercontinental Cup; Final Venue; 1986	Succeeded by PalaTrussardi; Milan
Preceded by Santiago Martín; San Cristóbal de La Laguna	FIBA Intercontinental Cup; Final Venue; 2021	Succeeded by Hassan Moustafa Sports Hall; Cairo
