= José Larralde =

Argentine singer (born 1937)

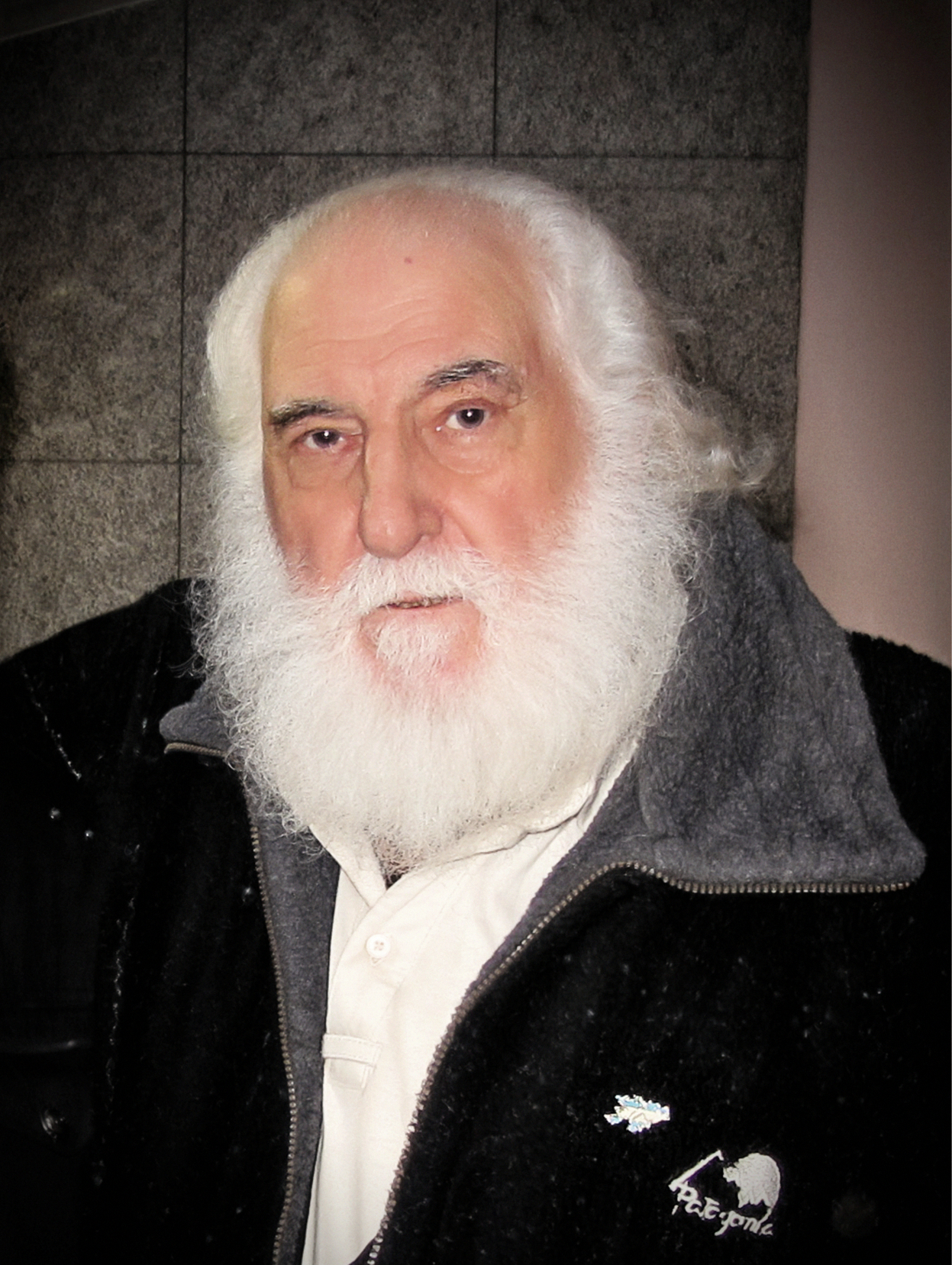
- Larralde in 2015

Background information
- Also known as: Don José
- Born: José Teodoro Larralde Saad; 22 October 1937 (age 88); Huanguelén, Buenos Aires, Argentina
- Genres: Folk music
- Occupations: Singer, songwriter
- Instruments: Vocals, guitar,
- Years active: 1967–present
- Labels: Columbia Records, CBS, RCA Victor
- Website: www.donjoselarralde.com.ar(archive.org)

José Larralde (born 22 October 1937) is an Argentine singer-songwriter of folk music.

At the early age of 7 years Larralde had already written songs with social content. Throughout the years he would write various songs about crafts, situations and people he had stumbled upon in his life. Of Iraqi and Basque descent, José Larralde has been a bricklayer, a rural worker, a welder, a mechanic, and a guitarist and songwriter.

Some songs by Jose were published by Jorge Cafrune in his LP Jorge Cafrune (1967). In 1967 Larralde recorded his first LP in a series of over 30 edited in Argentina: Canta José Larralde

Larralde is not as well known as other folklore argentino artists because of his shunning of promotions and massive concentrations. Notwithstanding, his singing crossed the national boundaries and triumphed in countries such as Germany, Australia, Mexico, Brazil, Uruguay, Paraguay, Chile and Spain among others. His lyrics deal with social and political injustices and inequities.

Larralde also debuted as an actor in the Argentine film Santos Vega (1971). His cover of "Quimey Neuquén," originally composed by Marcelo Berbel and Napoleón Milton Aguilar, was re-edited by Chancha via Circuito and it has been showcased in the AMC television series Breaking Bad, in the episode "Buried."

== Discography ==
- Canta José Larralde (1967)
- Permiso (1968)
- Herencia pa un hijo gaucho (1968)
- Hombre (1969)
- Pa que dentre (1969)
- Amigo (1970)
- Santos Vega (1970)
- Cimarrón y tabaco (1971)
- Cimbreando (1972)
- Macollando (1973)
- Y un porque sin final (1975)
- De hablarle a la soledad (1976)
- Al tranco manso nomás (1977)
- Si yo elegí mi destino (1978)
- Desde lejos (1979)
- Del sur pa' allá (1980)
- Amansando soledades (1981)
- Un viento de aquel lao (1982)
- Viento arriba (1984)
- El alegre canto de los pájaros tristes (1986)
- Como quien mira una espera (1995)
- Trayendo ayeres (1996)
- A las 11 1/4 (1999)
- Antología (2004)
- Larralde vs. Cafrune (2006)
