= Cemento =

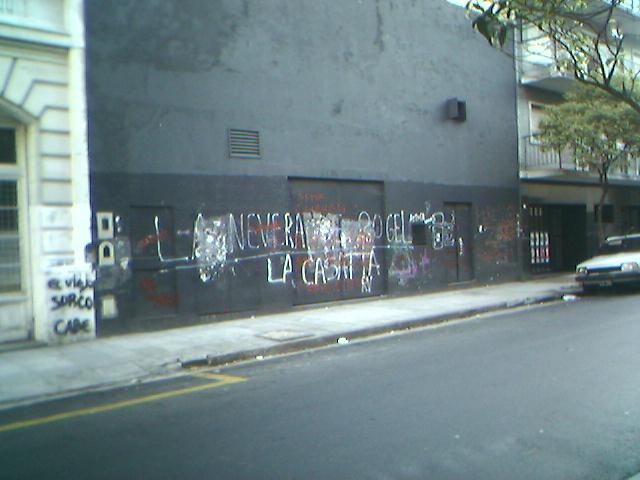
- Outer side of Cemento
- Interactive map of the Cemento area
- Alternative names: El templo del rock (Spanish: The temple of rock [music])

General information
- Type: Nightclub
- Location: Estados Unidos 1200, Buenos Aires, Argentina
- Opened: 1985
- Demolished: 2010
- Owner: Omar Chabán

Cemento was an Argentine nightclub, used for rock concerts. It was opened in 1985, and it was closed in 2004.

== History ==
Omar Chabán had a nightclub named "Café Einstein", which was closed several times. He opened a new one with his wife Katja Alemann, which was meant to be open in 1984, but the inauguration was delayed because the girder was broken during the construction. Cemento was finally opened on June 28, 1985. Alemann appeared costumed as a Valkyrie in the inauguration, including a chariot with horses. Initially, Cemento worked as a discothèque, an underground theater and a rock concert hall. In time, it became mainly a rock concert hall. Chabán still used as a theater for his own plays, during the days of the week.

Almost all notable musicians of Argentine rock played in Cemento at some point, with the exception of Charly García. Several events took place in it, and many bands recorded live albums. A concert of the Scottish punk rock band The Exploited in 1993 had an incident with neo-Nazis, which led to the first closing of Cemento. A violent incident during a punk rock festival on August 10, 1997, led to another 4-month closure, arranged by the mayor Fernando De la Rúa.

Cemento had a bad reputation, both because of the incidents and because of its unhealthy conditions and poor sound. New concert halls opened in the 2000s, such as "El Teatro" or "La Trastienda Club", began to dispute its primacy as the main one. Chaban opened a new and bigger concert hall, "República Cromañón", expecting to dispute the primacy of Obras Sanitarias for massive concerts. The República Cromañón nightclub fire in 2004 was the end of both República Cromañón and Cemento. The band Nuca, which was playing that night, interrupted the concert at the fourth song when they realized the event at the other concert hall: several parents had heard about the event at "Chaban's hall" and thought that the fire had taken place in Cemento. The police seized the concert hall the following day, looking for evidence against Chabán. Cemento was closed again, even having the required legal conditions to hold concerts.

The watchman Mario Duarte, who had been living in a small room inside Cemento since previous years, stayed in it after the closing. He tried to reopen it as a cooperative with other former workers, but failed. The concert hall was demolished in 2010, and replaced by a parking lot.

== Live albums ==
- Several artists – Metal Rock Festival II (1998)
- Catupecu Machu – A Morir!!! (1998)
- Callejeros en Cemento (2000)
- El Otro Yo – Contagiándose la energía del otro (2000)
- La Mancha de Rolando – Primer Cemento al Palo (2001)
- Intoxicados – Vivo Cemento (2001)
- Los Violadores – En Vivo y Ruidoso 2 (2002)
- Flema – Y aún yo te recuerdo (2003)
