= Almafuerte (band) =

Argentine heavy metal band

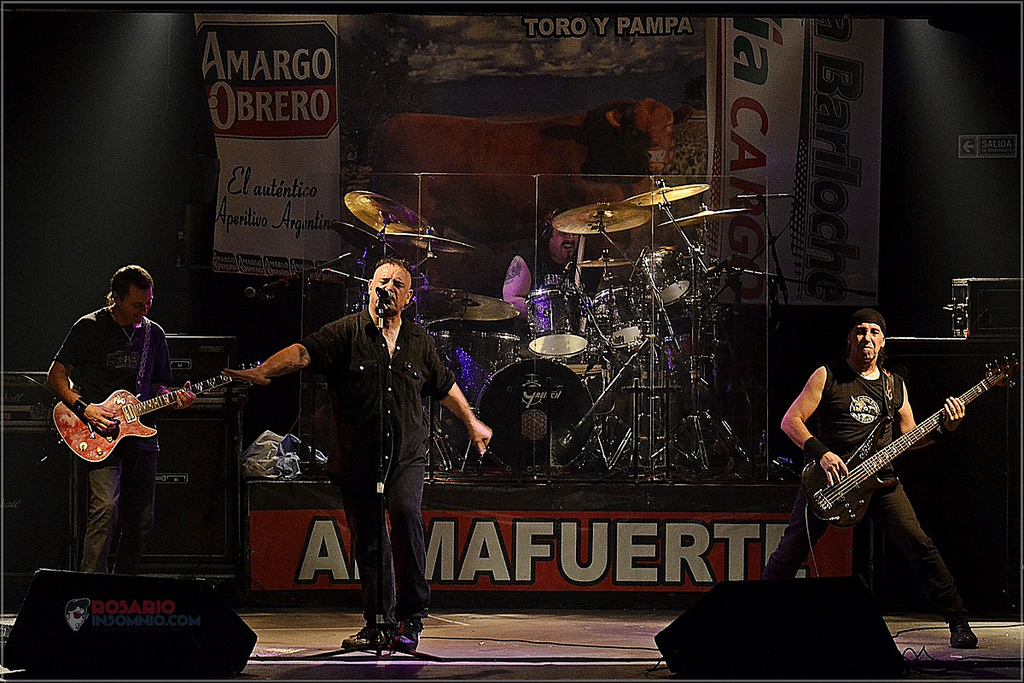
- Almafuerte live in 2012

Background information
- Origin: Buenos Aires, Argentina
- Genres: Heavy metal; speed metal; hard rock
- Years active: 1995–2016
- Past members: Ricardo Iorio; Claudio Marciello; Adrían "Bin" Valencia; Alberto "Beto" Ceriotti

Almafuerte was a heavy metal band from Argentina, formed by bassist and lead singer Ricardo Iorio in 1995, after the dissolution of Hermética.

== History ==
In 1994, Hermética, a heavy metal band from Argentina, broke up. Bassist Ricardo Iorio formed, one year later, Almafuerte, with guitarist Claudio "El Tano" Marcielo and drummer Claudio Cardacci.

In 1995 they released their first studio album, Mundo Guanaco, which included songs of both Hermética and of V8 (another of Ricardo Iorio's previous bands), and some new ones written by Iorio (most of them dealing with social issues). After the release of their second album, Del Entorno, Cardacci was replaced by Rodolfo Márquez. One year later, Márquez was replaced by Walter Martínez, after a demonstration with his band Vorax. With Martínez they released their first live album En Vida.

In 1998 they released a self-titled album Almafuerte and Profeta en su Tierra, and in 1999, their fifth studio album, A Fondo Blanco. Both Almafuerte and A Fondo Blanco are among the list of albums highlighted by Rolling Stone magazine on the 40th anniversary of the emergence of Argentine metal, in positions 5 and 21, respectively.

In 2001, drummer Martínez was replaced by Bin Valencia. In April, they released another album, Piedra Libre, with 10 new songs. During the 2001 tour, Iorio's wife, Ana Mourin, committed suicide.

In September of that year, Claudio Marcielo released a solo album titled Puesto En Marcha. Later in December they released their second live album En Vivo, Obras 2001.

In 2003 they released their studio album, Ultimando, followed by Toro y Pampa in 2006.

Later, in 2012, they released their album called Trillando la Fina.

In October 2017, in a conversation with Facundo Covarrubias, on 96.3 FM radio, Iorio confirmed the dissolution of Almafuerte and his intentions of continuing with his solo career.

== Members ==
=== Last lineup ===
- Ricardo Horacio Iorio – vocals (1995–2016), bass (1995–2003); died 2023
- Claudio Rosano "Tano" Marciello – guitars (1995–2016)
- Adrian "Bin" Valencia – drums (2001–2016); died 2022
- Carlos Roberto "Beto" Ceriotti – bass (2003–2016)

=== Former members ===
- Juan Espósito – drums (1995); died 2016
- Claudio Cardacci – drums (1995–1996)
- Rodolfo Márquez – drums (1996–1997)
- Walter Martínez – drums (1997–2000)

Timeline

== Discography ==
=== Studio albums ===
- Mundo Guanaco (Guanaco World) (1995)
- Del Entorno [From the environment] (1996)
- Almafuerte (1998)
- A Fondo Blanco [Down the hatch] (1999)
- Piedra Libre [Free stone] (2001)
- Ultimando [Finalizing] (2003)
- Toro y Pampa (Bull and Pampa) (2006)
- Trillando la fina [Threshing the fine harvest] (2012)

=== Live and compilation albums ===
- En Vida (1997)
- Profeta en su Tierra (1998)
- En Vivo Obras 2001 (2001)
- 10 Años (2005)
- En Vivo Obras 2008 (2009)

=== Others ===
- Peso argento (1997) Ricardo Iorio and Flavio Cianciarulo, with the participation of Claudio Marciello and Rodolfo Márquez.

== See also ==
- Pedro Bonifacio Palacios (Almafuerte)
