= Madhouse (magazine) =

Argentine music magazine

- Madhouse Nº 18 (January 1992), with Rata Blanca playing at the José Amalfitani Stadium
- Editor: César Fuentes Rodríguez; Federico Spratt; Frank Blumetti; Silvana Andrada
- Staff writers: Gabriel Ramovecchi; Pablo Gadea; Claudio Guarido; Gustavo Olmedo; Miguel Mora; Carlos Parise; Lala Toutonian; Eugenia Tavano; Marcelo Pisarro; Sebastián Feijoo; Hugo Garcia; Marcelo Assaf; Vanesa Díaz
- Categories: Heavy metal
- Frequency: Monthly
- Publisher: Editorial Llamoso
- Founder: César Fuentes Rodríguez
- First issue: 1989
- Final issue: 2001
- Country: Argentina
- Based in: Buenos Aires
- Language: Spanish

Madhouse was an Argentine heavy metal music magazine edited from 1989 to 2001. It was established by César Fuentes Rodríguez, along with other journalists from the former Riff Raff magazine.

Madhouse was the first Argentine heavy metal magazine to arrange interviews with international bands, instead of translating such interviews taken from international magazines. Unlike the Metal magazine, it had an informal style and wrote harsh critics to recordings or plays they did not consider of good quality. It had a higher success as a result, and Metal ended publication in 1994.

The magazine released some special editions as well, titled "Madhouse extra". Those special editions were specifically about a certain selected band. Some bands that got a special edition were Hermética, AC/DC, Kiss, Pantera, Megadeth, Marilyn Manson, etc. There was another special edition devoted to the death metal genre in general as well.

César Fuentes Rodríguez put aside the magazine in 1997 and established Epopeya, a new heavy metal magazine specifically about power metal and traditional heavy metal, while Madhouse would continue to focus on all the varieties of heavy metal music.

The magazines did not endure the 2001 Argentine economic crisis, and ended their publication by the end of 2001. César Fuentes Rodríguez left Argentina and moved to Spain for a few years. Then returned to continue publishing and working in media.
