= Fallen Angels =

A fallen angel is an angel who has been exiled or banished from Heaven.

Fallen Angels may also refer to:

== Film and television ==
- Fallen Angels (1948 film), a Greek film by Nikos Tsiforos
- Fallen Angels (1985 documentary film) by Gregory Dark
- Fallen Angels (1995 film), a Hong Kong film by Wong Kar-wai
- Fallen Angels (2006 film), a horror film featuring Adrianne Curry
- Fallen Angels (2008 film), a film by Morten Tyldum
- Fallen Angels (American TV series), a 1993–1995 American neo-noir anthology series that was broadcast on Showtime
- Fallen Angels (Australian TV series), a 1997 Australian drama series

== Literature ==
- Fallen Angels (play), a 1925 play by Noël Coward
- Fallen Angels: Six Noir Tales Told for Television, a 1993 anthology
- Fallen Angels (comics), a fictional team of superhuman teenagers in the Marvel Comics universe

=== Novels ===
- Fallen Angels (Myers novel), a 1988 novel by Walter Dean Myers
- Fallen Angels (Niven, Pournelle, and Flynn novel), a 1991 novel by Larry Niven, Jerry Pournelle, and Michael Flynn
- Fallen Angels, a novel by Susannah Kells
- Fallen Angels, a book by Mike Lee in the Horus Heresy series

== Music ==
=== Bands ===
- Phil May & the Fallen Angels
- Sonic Syndicate, formerly Fallen Angels, a Swedish metal band
- Fallen Angels, a 1970s U.S. band fronted by Gram Parsons and including Emmylou Harris
- Fallen Angels, a 1980s UK band founded by Knox
- Fallen Angels, a 1983 U.S. band formed by Dave Mustaine

=== Albums ===
- Fallen Angels (Bob Dylan album) (2016)
- Fallen Angels (Fallen Angels album) (1984)
- Fallen Angels (Venom album) (2011)

=== Songs ===
- "Fallen Angels" (Black Veil Brides song), 2011
- Fallen Angels (Ra song), 2005
- "Fallen Angels", a 1997 song by Aerosmith from Nine Lives
- "Fallen Angels", a song by Deceptikonz from Elimination
- "Fallen Angels", a song by Dio from Sacred Heart
- "Fallen Angels", a 1985 song by Sheena Easton from A Private Heaven
- "Fallen Angels", a song by Edguy from Mandrake
- "Fallen Angels", a 1992 song by Buffy Sainte-Marie
- ”Fallen Angels”, a 1997 song by Aerosmith from Nine Lives (album)

== Other uses ==
- The Fallen Angels (video game), a 1998 computer arcade fighting game
- Fallen Angels, an artwork by Patrick Woodroffe used on the cover of the Judas Priest album Sad Wings of Destiny

== See also ==
- Fallen angel (disambiguation)
- Angel of Darkness (disambiguation)
- Angels Fall (disambiguation)
- Dark Angel (disambiguation)
- Evil Angel (disambiguation)
- Falling Angels (disambiguation)
- The Fall of Angels, a novel in The Saga of Recluce series by L. E. Modesitt, Jr.
- Category:Fallen angels
