= Dennis McDougal =

American author and newspaper journalist (1947–2025)

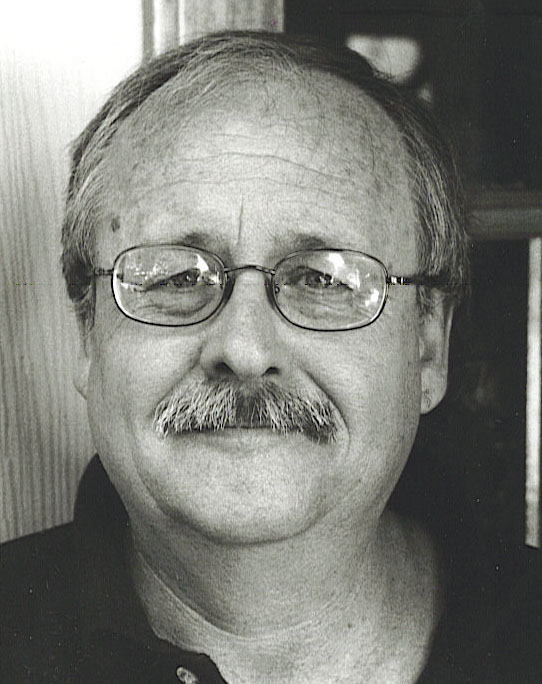
- Born: November 25, 1947; Lynwood, California, U.S.
- Died: March 22, 2025 (aged 77); Palm Springs, California, U.S.
- Occupations: Novelist; journalist; biographer; television producer
- Writing career
- Genres: non-fiction, fiction, biography
- Notable works: Privileged Son, Bob Dylan
- Website: www.dennismcdougal.com

Dennis McDougal (November 25, 1947 – March 22, 2025) was an American author and newspaper journalist, who has been called "L.A.'s No. 1 muckraker". His book Privileged Son was described as "illuminating reading for anyone interested in 20th-century Los Angeles or modern-day newspapering" by The New York Times.

== Background ==
McDougal was originally from Pasadena, California. After attending public school in the Los Angeles suburb of Lynwood, he received a bachelor of arts degree in English from University of California, Los Angeles, where he later earned a master's degree in journalism.

A native of Southern California, he lived near Memphis, Tennessee. McDougal died of injuries sustained in a traffic collision at a hospital in Palm Springs, California, on March 22, 2025, at the age of 77.

== Military service ==
From 1967 to 1969, McDougal was on active duty with the Naval Reserves. He served aboard the U.S.S. Annapolis in the South China Sea. In an interview with blogger Luke Ford, McDougal recalls his experience, much of which formed the basis for his first fiction novel, The Candlestickmaker, published in 2011:

...The captain of our ship had a predilection for taking the recruiting slogan – join the Navy and see the world – seriously. We'd go out and do our 30–60 days tossing messages back and forth from the mainland to Hawaii and then we'd go on R&R. We did that a lot. He took us all over the Far East.

== Career ==
Before turning his attention full-time to writing books in 1993, McDougal reported on the glitzy and occasionally corrupt aspects of Hollywood as a staff writer for ten years at the Los Angeles Times, while previously working as a staff writer for The Riverside Press-Enterprise (1973–77) and The Long Beach Press-Telegram (1977–1981). From 2002 to 2006, he worked as a contributor for The New York Times.

In 2007, the controversy surrounding his book Privileged Son: Otis Chandler and the Rise and Fall of the Los Angeles Times Dynasty—the newspaper McDougal once worked for—was discussed in an interview with McDougal on NPR's Morning Edition. The New York Times in a review called McDougal's book "illuminating reading for anyone interested in 20th-century Los Angeles or modern-day newspapering."

Between books, McDougal was a producer for CNN during the O. J. Simpson trial, where he was responsible for tracking down witnesses, relatives, and acquaintances for interviews as well as documents and public records for use on camera as the trial unfolded.

A longtime contributor to TV Guide, McDougal's last piece covered the murderous saga of actor Robert Blake and Bonny Lee Bakley.

In 2014, Turner Publishing Co. released McDougal's biography of Bob Dylan, Dylan: The Biography. Perfect Sound Forever magazine wrote that "McDougal answers many questions about Dylan's life and times and provides insight about it.

=== Awards ===
In 1982, McDougal was awarded a John S. Knight Fellowship at Stanford University and spent a year teaching and studying in Japan and Canada, as well as at the Palo Alto campus.

He had earned more than 50 honors, including a 1984 National Headliner Award and several Associated Press awards.

=== Books ===
McDougal was the author of 13 books:

- Angel of Darkness (1991) - A cult classic about Southern California serial murderer Randy Kraft, the mild-mannered computer whiz by day and lust killer at night, who holds the dubious distinction of being one of the most prolific murderers (approximately 67 victims) in modern U.S. history.
- Fatal Subtraction: How Hollywood Really Does Business (with Pierce O'Donnell) (1992) - An inside look at Hollywood's landmark Art Buchwald v. Paramount trial, the Coming to America lawsuit that unveiled Hollywood's sleazy accounting practices and changed forever the way studios conduct business.
- In the Best of Families (1994) - The "Best Fact Crime" in the Mystery Writers of America's Edgar Award nominee, this book recounts the descent into murderous madness of the family of Roy Miller, Ronald Reagan's attorney.
- Mother's Day (1998) - The best-selling saga of a Sacramento mother of six who enticed two of her sons into a monstrous plot to torture and murder her own two daughters.
- The Last Mogul (1998) - An unauthorized biography of Lew Wasserman, a Hollywood talent agent who later became head of Universal Studios. In his book, McDougal accuses Wasserman of mob ties, monopolistic practices and alludes to Ronald Reagan illegally favoring Wasserman.
- The Yosemite Murders (2000) - In Yosemite National Park, Cary Stayner commits murder after murder as law enforcement scrambles to decipher anything that will save hapless vacationers.
- Privileged Son (2001) - A biography of Los Angeles Times publisher Otis Chandler, and winner of the Fordham University Anne M. Sperber Award as the nation's best media biography in 2002 Privileged Son was later adapted into a PBS American experience documentary titled Inventing L.A.: The Chandlers and Their Times. In 2007, McDougal discussed his book on NPR's Morning Edition.
- Blood Cold, McDougal and Mary Murphy (2002) - Former child actor, acclaimed star of In Cold Blood and iconic 1970s TV detective in Baretta, Robert Blake met Bonny Lee Bakley at a party and slept with her the same night. A Hollywood parasite and con artist known for elaborate Internet sex scams and a shameless pursuit of money and fame, Bakley wanted to marry a star and by the late 1990s, Blake was her target: a troubled has-been coasting on the fumes of past success. Six months after their quickie wedding, Bakley was shot to death in a parked car on a dark Hollywood side street, and the No. 1 suspect was Blake.
- Five Easy Decades: How Jack Nicholson Became the Biggest Movie Star in Modern Times (2008) - A biography about the life of American film star Jack Nicholson.
- The Candlestickmaker (2011) - A work of fiction, based on McDougal's own experiences serving in the US Navy during the Vietnam War.
- Bob Dylan: The Biography (2014) - Released May 13, 2014, it details the life and works of the folk rock legend Bob Dylan (John Wiley & Sons).
- Operation White Rabbit: LSD, the DEA and the Fate of the Acid King (2020) - Skyhorse Publishing.
- Citizen Wynn: A Sin City Saga of Power, Lust, and Blind Ambition (2024) - This unauthorized biography is the cautionary saga of uber-wealthy casino king Steve Wynn, who built a global gambling empire on fantasy, grift, and misogyny before hubris and #MeToo brought him down. (Rare Bird Books)
