= Falling Angels =

Falling Angels may refer to:

- Falling Angels (film), a 2003 adaptation of the novel by Barbara Gowdy (see below)
- Falling Angels, a 2001 novel by Tracy Chevalier
- Falling Angels, a 1989 novel by Barbara Gowdy
- Falling Angels, a 1979 novel by K. M. Peyton
- Falling Angels, a 1989 ballet choreographed by Jiří Kylián

== See also ==
- Falling Angel, a 1978 horror novel by William Hjortsberg
- Fallen Angels (disambiguation)
- Fallen angel (disambiguation)
- Angels Fall (disambiguation)
