= Dark Angel (comics) =

Dark Angel, in comics, may refer to:

- Dark Angel (DC Comics), a villain who battled Wonder Woman
- Dark Angel (Marvel Comics), a heroine from the Marvel UK imprint
- Dark Angel (Shadow-X), an alternate version of Warren Worthington III, part of the Shadow-X team
- Dark Angel (manga), by manga artist Kia Asamiya, tells the stories of turmoil between four gods warrior, in far future Earth.

== See also ==
- Dark Angel (disambiguation)
