= Testigo (band) =

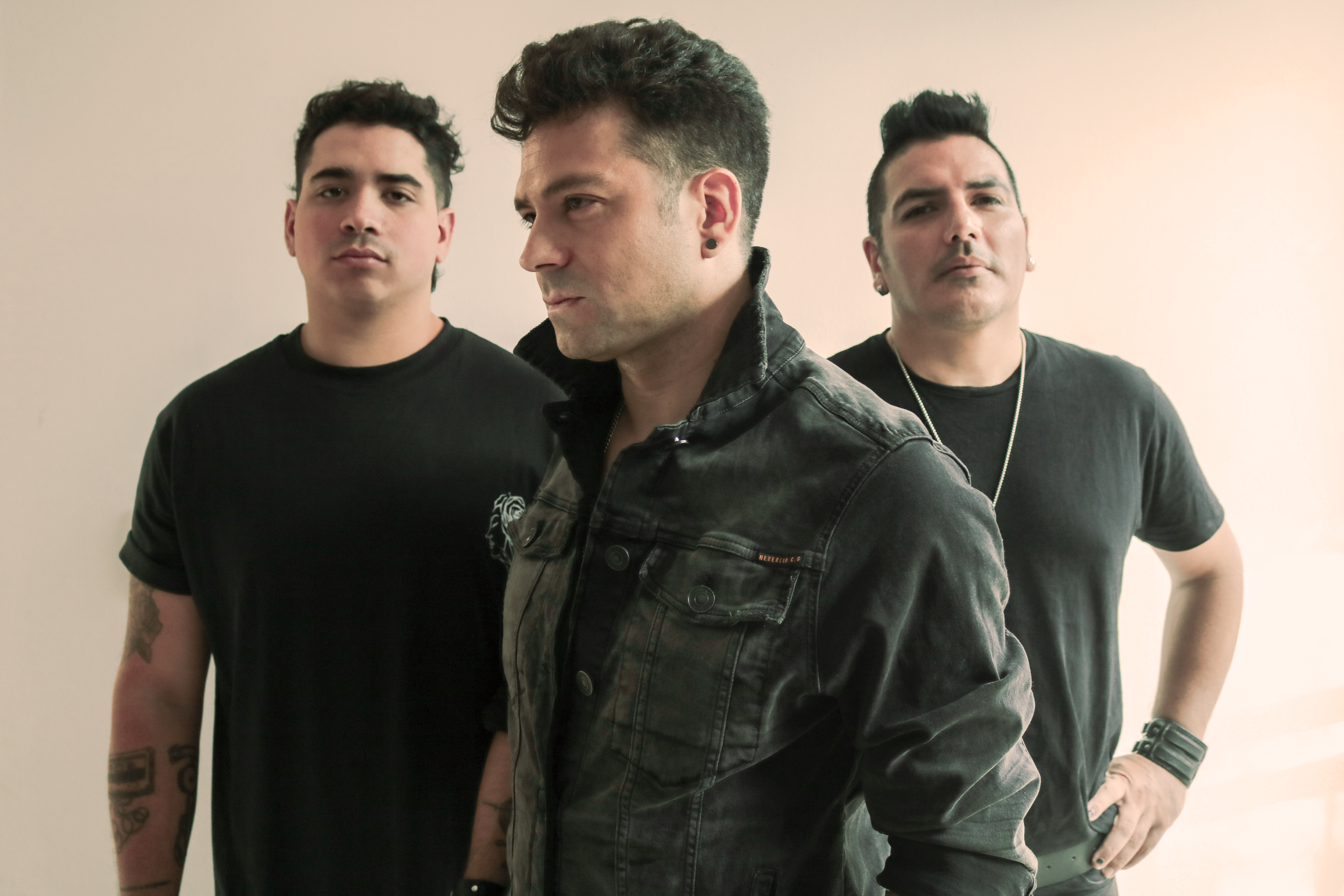
- Press photo

Background information
- Origin: Neuquén and Córdoba, Argentina
- Genres: Rock
- Years active: 2006–present
- Labels: Sony Music, Popart Discos
- Website: testigo.ar

Testigo is an Argentine rock group originating from Neuquén and Córdoba. The trio is composed of Pablo Montoya on guitar and vocals, Marcelo Matos on bass and backing vocals, and Ezequiel Galeassi on drums.

== History ==
Testigo's recorded their debut album, Sobrenatural (2008) and No Me Importa (2015), at Estudios Maya in Córdoba, produced by Luis Primo and mastered by Gabriel Cabrera. The same year, they began collaborating with producer Edu Schmidt, on the production of their second album, Maquinal. The band embarked on a national tour, and participated in the festivals Córdoba Rockea and Cosquín Rock.

In 2018, Testigo released their third album, Arden Flores. The first single, "Nunca Entenderás", It featured the artistic production of Mariano Martínez, contributing guitar and vocals.

== Discography ==
Albums

- Sobrenatural (2008)
- Desenchufado (2014)
- No Me Importa (2015)
- Maquinal (2016)
- Arden Flores (2022)
- Live Session Part 1 (2024) (EP)
- Live Session Part 2 (2024) (EP)

Selected singles

- "Todo Mal"
- "Nunca Entenderás" (feat. Mariano Martínez)
- "Melodias de Soledad" (feat. Esteban Kabalin)
- "Camino de la libertad"
