= El Cielo Puede Esperar =

Studio album by Attaque 77
- Released: 1990
- Recorded: August–September 1990; Aguilar Studios
- Studio: AGUILAR RECORDS
- Genre: Punk rock Pop punk
- Length: 34:16
- Label: Radio Tripoli
- Producer: Juanchi Baleirón

Attaque 77 chronology
Dulce Navidad (1989)	El Cielo Puede Esperar (1990)	Rabioso! La Pesadilla Recién Comienza (1991)

El cielo puede esperar is the second album by Argentine rock band Attaque 77, released in 1990 by Radio Tripoli (then the primary source for punk rock releases in Argentina). With much improved sound and songwriting in comparison with their first LP Dulce Navidad, this album established the band as a regular feature in mainstream Argentine rock. Originally released only on vinyl, it was released on CD in 1991 (coupled with the first LP). This CD pressing has since being deleted, and both albums were later released separately.

== Recording and Production ==
Stylistically it follows the guidelines of their debut, mostly '77 punk rock, but if the first album was too centered on the Ramones as an influence, this one expanded the showcase to the Sex Pistols, The Clash (actually a heavy influence on the band) and the Buzzcocks. However, the media and audience in Argentina hammered the concept of Attaque 77 as an exclusively Ramones-driven outfit, mostly due to ignorance of other punk references in the media and the general public.

Lyric-wise, the album centered on life in the working class suburbs and young men's expectations being somewhat crippled by life. The juvenile tone of the first album remains but the joking lyrics are gone.

Although it wasn't originally one of the singles cut for radio promotion (an honour reserved to the title track and "Donde las aguilas se atreven"), the mid-tempo ballad "Hacelo por mi" was a smash hit on its own in early 1991, and Attaque 77 actually became a crossover band for a while (there was even a TV show named after the song). This first great upsurge of popularity lasted about a year, and the band actually stopped playing the song for years, being sick of it (and their hardcore fans were wary of it because it was a commercial hit). Since then they've make peace with their old hit and they're playing it again.

The song "Espadas y serpientes", written from the point of view of a jailed man giving hope to his girlfriend who's waiting for him to be released, is particularly cherished by the fans and has become a live classic, and it can be considered Attaque's signature tune.

== Track listing ==
- All songs written and composed by Ciro Pertusi, except where noted.

No.	Title	Length
1.	"El Cielo Puede Esperar [Heaven Can Wait]" (Pertusi-Martinez)	4:14
2.	"Más De Un Millón [More Than a Million]"	2:35
3.	"Tiempo Para Estar [Time to Stay]"	3:03
4.	"Sólo Por Placer [Only for Pleasure]" (Pertusi-Vera)	3:14
5.	"Vuelve A Casa [Go Back Home]"	3:14
6.	"Espadas Y Serpientes [Swords and Snakes]"	4:28
7.	"Un Momento De Meditación [A Moment of Meditation]" (Pertusi-Vera)	2:00
8.	"Hacelo Por Mí [Do It for Me]" (Pertusi-Martinez)	3:49
9.	"No Te Pudiste Aguantar [You Couldn't Stand It]" (Adrián Vera)	3:32
10.	"Donde Las Águilas Se Atreven [Where Eagles Dare]"	4:07

== Personnel ==
Attaque 77

- Ciro Pertusi – Lead vocals.
- Mariano Martínez – Lead guitar.
- Adrián Vera – Bass, backing vocals.
- Leonardo De Cecco – Drums.

Guests

- Diego "Perico" Blanco – Keyboards.
- Juanchi Baleirón – electric guitar Acoustic guitar backing vocals percussion.

Additional personnel

- Martin Menzel – Engineer.
- Walter Kolm and Sergio Fasanelli – Executive producers.
