= Angel of Darkness =

Angel of Darkness or variations thereof may refer to:

- Fallen angels of Abrahamic religions

== Film and TV ==
- Angels of Darkness (Italian: Donne proibite), a 1954 film
- Angel of Darkness (anime) (Japanese: 淫獣教師, Hepburn: Injū Kyōshi), a 1994 hentai anime series
- The Alienist: Angel of Darkness, the second season of The Alienist, based on the 1997 book

== Books ==
- Angel of Darkness, 1990 novel by Samuel M. Key
- Angel of Darkness (book), a 1991 true crime book by Dennis McDougal
- The Angel of Darkness, a 1997 crime novel by Caleb Carr

== Other ==
- "Angel of Darkness" (song), a 2003 song by Alex Christensen
- Tomb Raider: The Angel of Darkness, a 2003 video game

== See also ==
- Angels of Darkness, Demons of Light I, a 2011 album by Earth
  - Angels of Darkness, Demons of Light II, a 2012 album by Earth
- Fallen angel (disambiguation)
- Evil Angel (disambiguation)
- Dark Angel (disambiguation)
- Darkness (disambiguation)
- Angel (disambiguation)
