= Angel Falls (disambiguation) =

Angel Falls is a waterfall in Venezuela and the highest in the world.

Angel Falls may also refer to:

== Other waterfalls ==
- Angel Falls (Georgia), US
- Angel Falls (Maine), US

== Arts, entertainment, and media ==
- Angel Falls (TV series), an American television series that aired in 1993
- Angel Falls, the fictional setting of The Guardians of Time trilogy
- Delta Force: Angel Falls, a never-released video game announced in 2008
- Angel Falls Chritsmas, a Hallmark film of 2021

== See also ==
- Angels Fall (disambiguation)
