= Ángel caído =

El ángel caído or variants may refer to:

- El ángel caído (TV series), a 1985 Mexican telenovela
- El ángel caído (album) or the title song, by Avalanch, 2001
- The Fallen Angel (1949 film), a 1949 Mexican film directed by Juan José Ortega
- Ángel caído (film), a 2010 Mexican film featuring Humberto Zurita
- "Ángeles caídos", a song by Attaque 77 from Trapos, 2001

== See also ==
- Fuente del Ángel Caído, a fountain in Buen Retiro Park, Madrid, Spain
