= Rabioso! La Pesadilla Recién Comienza =

Live album by Attaque 77
- Released: 1991
- Recorded: October 5, 1991
- Genre: Punk rock
- Label: Radio Tripoli

Attaque 77 chronology
| El Cielo Puede Esperar (1990) | Rabioso! La Pesadilla Recién Comienza (1991) | Angeles Caidos (1992) |

Rabioso! La Pesadilla Recién Comienza ("Angry! The Nightmare's Just Begun") is the first Attaque 77 live album.

== Overview ==
This is the first live album from Attaque 77, released and recorded in 1991 at the Estadio Obras Sanitarias in Buenos Aires.

== Track listing ==
1. "Introducción"
2. "Donde las águilas se atreven"
3. "No te pudiste aguantar"
4. "Papá Llegó Borracho"
5. "Soy de Attaque"
6. "Combate"
7. "Armas blancas"
8. "Espadas y Serpientes"

== Credits ==
- Federico Pertusi - Lead vocals.
- Mariano Martínez - Guitar.
- Ciro Pertusi - Bass, backing vocals.
- Leonardo de Cecco - Drums.
- Alvaro Villagra - Acoustic guitar on "Caminando Por El Microcentro".
