= Angels Fall (disambiguation) =

Angels Fall is a 1982 play by Lanford Wilson.

Angels Fall may also refer to:

- "Fall of the angels", an Islamic-Judeo-Christian religious event resulting from the War in Heaven
- Angels Fall (film), a 2007 American television adaptation of the Nora Roberts novel (see below)
- "Angels Fall" (song), by Breaking Benjamin, 2015
- Angels' Fall, a 1957/2013 novel by Frank Herbert
- Angels Fall, a 2006 novel by Nora Roberts

== See also ==
- Angel Falls (disambiguation)
- Angelfall, a 2011 novel by Susan Ee
- Fallen angel (disambiguation)
- Fallen Angels (disambiguation)
- Falling Angels (disambiguation)
