= Dulce Navidad =

Studio album by Attaque 77
- Released: March 1989
- Recorded: October–November 1988
- Genre: Punk rock
- Length: 18:09
- Label: Radio Tripoli
- Producer: Michel Peyronel

Attaque 77 chronology
Mas De Un Million (1987)	Dulce Navidad (1989)	El Cielo Puede Esperar (1990)

Dulce Navidad (Spanish for "Sweet Christmas") is the first Attaque 77 album. It was released in 1989.

== Overview ==
This is the first official album from Attaque 77, released in 1989 because the edition was delayed by Radio Tripoli. The songs were recorded in a short time due to the unwillingness of the members. The lyrics are not serious. For example, the song "Gil" is about a man whose wife is raped by a Smurf.

== Track listing ==
- All songs written by Ciro Pertusi, except where noted.
1. "Hay Una Bomba En El Colegio" [There's a Bomb at School] – 2:08
2. "Me Volviste A Engañar" [You Cheated on Me Again] (Pertusi–Martinez) – 2:11
3. "Gil" [Jerk] – 2:26
4. "Papá Llegó Borracho" [Daddy Came Home Drunk] – 2:24
5. "Caminando Por El Microcentro" [Walking through the Microcentro] (Pertusi–Martinez) – 2:34
6. "Sola En La Cancha" [Alone in the Field] – 3:22
7. "No Te Quiero Más" [I Don't Love You Anymore] (Pertusi–Martinez) – 3:04

== Credits ==
- Federico Pertusi – Lead vocals.
- Mariano Martínez – Guitar.
- Ciro Pertusi – Bass, backing vocals.
- Leonardo de Cecco – Drums.
- Alvaro Villagra – Acoustic guitar on "Caminando Por El Microcentro".
