= Patrick Kearney =

American serial killer (born 1939)

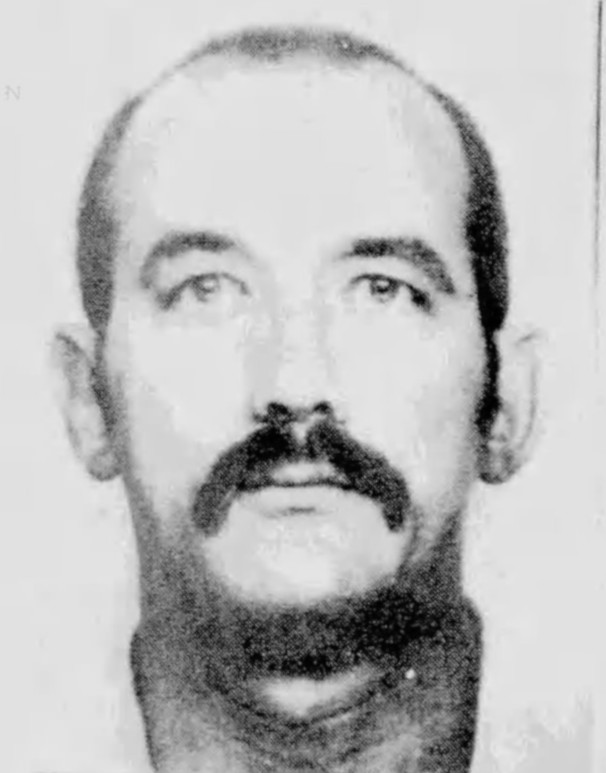
- Kearney's mugshot on July 1, 1977
- Born: Patrick Wayne Kearney; September 24, 1939 (age 87); East Los Angeles, California, U.S.
- Other names: The Trash Bag Killer; The Freeway Killer
- Convictions: First-degree murder (21 counts); Necrophilia (10+ counts)
- Penalty: Life imprisonment (x21)

Details
- Victims: 28+
- Span of crimes: 1962 – April 6, 1977
- Country: United States
- State: California
- Date apprehended: July 1, 1977
- Imprisoned at: Mule Creek State Prison

Patrick Wayne Kearney (born September 24, 1939), also called the Trash Bag Killer and the Freeway Killer, is an American serial killer who sexually assaulted and murdered a minimum of twenty-eight young men and boys in southern California between 1962 and 1977. Kearney often engaged in necrophilia with his victims' bodies before disemboweling and dismembering them. He frequently wrapped his victims' severed limbs in trash bags and scattered them in various locations, mainly along state highways.

In 1978, Kearney pleaded guilty to twenty-one counts of murder and was sentenced to twenty-one consecutive life sentences. Kearney was the first of three known serial killers who preyed on young men in southern California in the 1970s and 1980s to be identified; the others were William Bonin and Randy Kraft.

== Early life ==
Patrick Wayne Kearney was born on September 24, 1939, in East Los Angeles, California, as the oldest of three sons and was raised in a reasonably stable family on the east side of Los Angeles that was of middle-class background. Kearney's mother was a homemaker, while his father was an officer for the Los Angeles Police Department.

In 1950, Kearney's family moved to Reseda and settled on Runnymede Street. Kearney started school at Reseda Elementary. Kearney, being a thin and sickly child, was often a target of bullies, who beat him up frequently and berated him as a "queer" despite his supposed interest in girls. In his teens, he became withdrawn and harboured fantasies about killing personal enemies, often ending in Kearney skinning them alive. In addition, he developed sexual fantasies revolving around domination and began engaging in bestiality when he was 13. Kearney claimed in his police confession that one of his first sexual experiences was with the family dog.

When Kearney was 13, his father purchased him a .22 caliber rifle. His father taught him to kill pigs and chickens in hopes that it would toughen up his son. Later, his family moved to Willcox, Arizona, where his father found employment as a salesman for a travel agency. Kearney started school at Willcox Middle School, though he still experienced bullying. While he was living in Arizona, he became proficient in Spanish.

Soon after, his family moved back to California and found residence in Redondo Beach. After graduating high school in 1957, his family moved to Dallas. Kearney found work doing temporary jobs though he eventually found his way back to California and moved to Torrance, California, where he enrolled in El Camino Community College. He did not complete the courses he had enrolled in.

In 1958, Kearney joined the Air Force and was stationed in Texas. While in the Air Force, he met Lubbock native David Hill through a friend of a friend. Kearney claimed in a letter to Australian author Amanda Howard that he befriended Lee Harvey Oswald while attending Military Language School and worked with him in top-secret military language operations. He went on to claim that he drove Oswald to the Mexican border and almost went to Mexico City with him.

In 1961, Kearney received an honorable discharge from the military and convinced Hill to move in with him in Long Beach, California. By 1962, Hill and Kearney's relationship had deteriorated, and Hill moved back to Lubbock to live with his ex-wife. During this period, Kearney started to engage in hookups with other men.

He returned to California following a brief marriage that ended in divorce and eventually worked as an engineer for Hughes Aircraft.

It was from his experiences in his early years in California that Kearney cultivated his skill as a gay pickup artist. Kearney mostly sought out partners in San Diego and Tijuana, Mexico, where he used his fluency in Spanish and keen interest in Latin American culture as a basis to connect with potential partners. Kearney claimed to have killed his first victim, a hitchhiker he picked up and murdered in Orange, California, around 1962. He claimed several more victims, mostly transients, before moving to Redondo Beach, near Los Angeles, in 1967 with Hill.

== Murders ==
Kearney confessed to having committed his first murder in the spring of 1962. The victim's name is unknown, but he was confirmed to be age nineteen, white, and claimed that the man was from either Louisiana or Oklahoma. Kearney had convinced the male to take a ride on his motorcycle with him to a secluded area outside of Indio, California. When they arrived, Kearney shot the man in the head and sexually assaulted the body. It is unknown if the body was ever found, but Kearney confessed to this murder and two additional ones from 1962. The second victim was the younger cousin of Kearney's first victim, who had witnessed Kearney drive away with the victim. Kearney claimed that this victim was 16 and had been inquiring of Kearney about the whereabouts of his cousin. Kearney claimed that he had offered to take the victim to his cousin and that he had driven and killed him in the same location before sexually assaulting the youth.

The first murder that Kearney confessed to and was convicted of occurred "sometime around Christmas" of 1968, while he was living in Culver City, approximately one year after he and David Hill had taken residence together. The murder took place inside his Van Buren Avenue residence. According to Kearney, this victim (whose name is known as "George") was lured into his vehicle in San Diego and taken to his home, then shot in the head moments after entering the house. The victim was then dragged to his bathroom, where he was sodomized, then skinned and dismembered in the bathtub with an X-Acto knife. Kearney also extracted the bullet from the victim's head to ensure the murder would not be traced to him. He then buried the dismembered body behind his garage. Kearney did not kill for over a year following this murder, primarily out of fear that law enforcement would inquire about the disappearance of George. Years later, the identity of this victim has yet to be discovered besides his first name and body. When George's body was exhumed, forensics estimated that he had been murdered between 1968 and 1970. Forensics also found that the skeleton had a one-by-one to one-by-five cut made in the skull by a sharp object.

As time passed, Kearney greatly refined his modus operandi, which enabled him to carry out his crimes much more efficiently and frequently. Starting in 1974, Kearney is estimated to have committed murders on an almost monthly basis. After picking up his victims along the freeway or at gay bars in his Volkswagen or in his truck, Kearney would typically shoot his victims in the temple above the ear with a Derringer .22 pistol in his right hand, while steering his car with his left hand and simultaneously monitoring the car's speed to avoid exhibiting any unusual behavior to potential witnesses. After murdering his victims, Kearney would leave the bodies slumped upright in the passenger seat and drive to a secluded area to sexually violate them.

After copulating with his victims' corpses, Kearney would usually mutilate and dismember the remains with a hacksaw before disposing of them in various locations such as canyons, landfills, and along the freeways, usually in industrial trash bags. In some cases, Kearney disposed of the bodies in the desert, where they could be consumed by carrion-eating animals. Kearney would sometimes drain the victim's blood to eliminate odour and would also sometimes bathe the body parts prior to disposal to minimize the presence of dried blood and eliminate fingerprint evidence. Sometimes, Kearney would beat his victims after they were dead; he perceived beating his dead victims as a cathartic exercise and a means by which he could effectively vent suppressed anger and acquire a sense of power. Often, the victims resembled people who had bullied him in his childhood.

In June 1971, John Demchik was picked up by Kearney after being offered a ride. Kearney had shot him in the head before disposing of his body 15 miles southeast of Calexico. Demchik's body would not be found until February 1973 by the Imperial County Police Department. When Demchik's body was found, it was initially believed that Demchik was a Mexican national who had illegally crossed the border. Upon closer inspection when exhumed, it was discovered that a bullet had entered Demchik's left ear and lodged behind his right cheek. Demchik would not be identified until 1978 and was Kearney's only victim to not be found mutilated.

In September 1973, seventeen-year-old John Barwick was picked up hitchhiking on the southern California highway by Kearney. Barwick's body was found that same day. When Barwick was exhumed, there was strong evidence based on semen found in the rectum that Barwick was sexually assaulted at the time of death.

Although Kearney primarily preyed on young men, there were known child and adolescent victims as well. Kearney's youngest victim was Ronald Dean Smith, age 5, who disappeared in Lennox, California, on August 24, 1974. Smith had asked his grandmother if he could go and play at Lennox Park with a friend. While at the park, an argument ensued, leaving Smith by himself. While walking home, he was picked up by Kearney for a ride. During this ride, Kearney had taken him to McDonald's as Smith complained of being hungry. Subsequently, Smith's body was discovered alongside Ortega Highway in Riverside County on October 12, 1974. Smith's body was discovered with his underwear around his ankles and semen present in his anal cavity. A forensic investigation found that Smith's face had abrasions on the nose and chin, as well as contusions on his lips from the pressure of Kearney's fingernails and palm. The pathology report also noted that Smith was suffocated.

On June 16, 1976, Kearney killed Michael Craig McGhee, 13, of Redondo Beach. Records confirmed that McGhee had a lengthy history of juvenile delinquency. Kearney claimed to have picked up McGhee, who was hitchhiking from Inglewood Avenue near Lennox to Torrance. According to the police, Kearney befriended the boy and invited him to attend a camping trip to Lake Elsinore over the course of a weekend. Kearney claimed to have perceived McGhee as a potential threat and shot him without warning after McGhee openly boasted of his criminal exploits and inquired about the presence and location of burglar alarms in Kearney's home. Later, when interviewed by detectives, Kearney implied that he had destroyed the remains, stating: "I disposed of the body... You aren't going to find him."

Merle "Hondo" Chance, 8, of Venice, vanished on April 6, 1977, while supposedly riding his bicycle in the vicinity of Kearney's place of work. Kearney claims to have smothered the boy, taken his body home overnight, and later disposed of the remains in the Angeles National Forest off Angeles Crest Highway, approximately 11 miles north of Altadena. Chance's decomposed remains were discovered on May 26, 1977. Merle Chance was Kearney's last known victim.

The victim who ultimately led to Kearney's arrest was John Otis LaMay, 17, whom he killed on Sunday, March 13, 1977. At approximately 5:30 pm on that same day, LaMay told a neighbor he was going to Redondo Beach to meet a man named Dave, whom he had met at a local gym. This was in fact David Hill, who had given LaMay the address to Kearney's home. Hill was absent when LaMay arrived, so Kearney invited him in to watch television until Hill returned. Without provocation, Kearney impulsively reached for his pistol and shot LaMay in the back of the head. Kearney later dismembered the corpse and dumped the remains in the desert.

When his killing spree was at its zenith, Kearney's odd tendencies went largely undetected. A local grocery store owner named Jerry Stevens did, however, note that Kearney frequently purchased butcher knives after examining them and inquiring about the quality of the steel. Stevens also described Kearney as "a loner with an eerie sense of quiet about him". Kearney's supervisor at Hughes Aircraft referred to him as a "model worker".

== Victims ==
#	Name	Age	Date of murder	Date of discovery	Particulars
1	"Unknown" 1	19	Spring 1962	N/A	Driven to a deserted area, shot in the head, and sodomized postmortem.
2	"Unknown" 2	16	1962	N/A	Driven to the same location as the first victim, shot in the head, and sodomized postmortem. According to Kearney, this victim was the younger cousin of his first victim.
3	"Mike"	18	???	???	Shot in the back of the head and sodomized postmortem.
4	"George"	???	December 1968	July 8, 1977	Shot in the head while sleeping, then put into a bathtub and sodomized postmortem. Police found his skeleton with Kearney's direction after his arrest.
5	John Demchik	13	June 26, 1971	February 9, 1973	Shot to death.
6	James Fletcher Barwick	17	September 22, 1973	September 22, 1973	Shot in the back of the head.
7	Ronald Dean Smith Jr.	5	August 24, 1974	October 12, 1974	Suffocated.
8	Albert Rivera	21	April 13, 1975	April 13, 1975	Shot in the head, taken to Kearney's house, sodomized postmortem, dismembered, and stuffed into trash bags to be disposed of in various locations.
9	Larry Gene Walters	20	October 31, 1975	November 10, 1975	Shot, sodomized postmortem, dismembered, put into trash bags, and disposed of in various locations.
10	Kenneth Eugene Buchanan	17	March 1, 1976	April 7, 1976	Shot in the back of the head, sodomized, then shot three more times.
11	Oliver Peter Molitor	13	March 21, 1976	Never found	Picked up while hitchhiking, sexually assaulted, shot, dismembered, and buried in various areas at the Palos Verdes landfill.
12	Larry Armendariz	15	April 18, 1976	April 19, 1976	Shot in the back of the head, sodomized postmortem, and dismembered.
13	Michael Craig McGhee	13	June 11, 1976	N/A	Shot in the back of the head, sodomized postmortem, and dismembered.
14	John Woods	23	June 20, 1976	June 21, 1977	Shot to death.
15	Larry Espy	17	1976	August 23, 1976	Shot in the back of the head, sodomized postmortem, and dismembered.
16	Wilfrid Lawrence Faherty	20	August 1976	August 28, 1976	Shot in the back of the head.
17	Randall Lawrence Moore	16	August 1976	October 10, 1976	Shot in the head.
18	Timothy Brian Ingham	19	September 15, 1976	September 24, 1976	Shot in the back of the head while asleep. Remains were thrown down a ravine.
19	Robert William Benniefiel	17	Fall 1976	Fall 1976	Picked up while hitchhiking, shot in the back of the head, sodomized postmortem, dismembered, and dumped in various locations.
20	David Allen	27	Fall 1976	October 9, 1976	Shot in the head and left on the side of the road.
21	Mark Andrew Orach	20	October 5, 1976	October 6, 1976	Shot in the head.
22	Nicolas Hernandez-Jimenez	28	January 1977	January 23, 1977	Shot, dismembered, and wrapped in trash bags for disposal.
23	Arturo Ramos Marquez	24	c. February 26, 1977	March 3, 1977	Shot, sodomized postmortem, and dismembered.
24	John Otis LaMay	17	March 13, 1977	March 18, 1977	Shot, sodomized postmortem, and dismembered. The murder of LaMay was the crime for which Kearney was arrested.
25	Merle "Hondo" Chance	8	April 6, 1977	May 26, 1977	Smothered, sodomized postmortem, then dumped off of Angeles Crest Highway.

== Capture and imprisonment ==
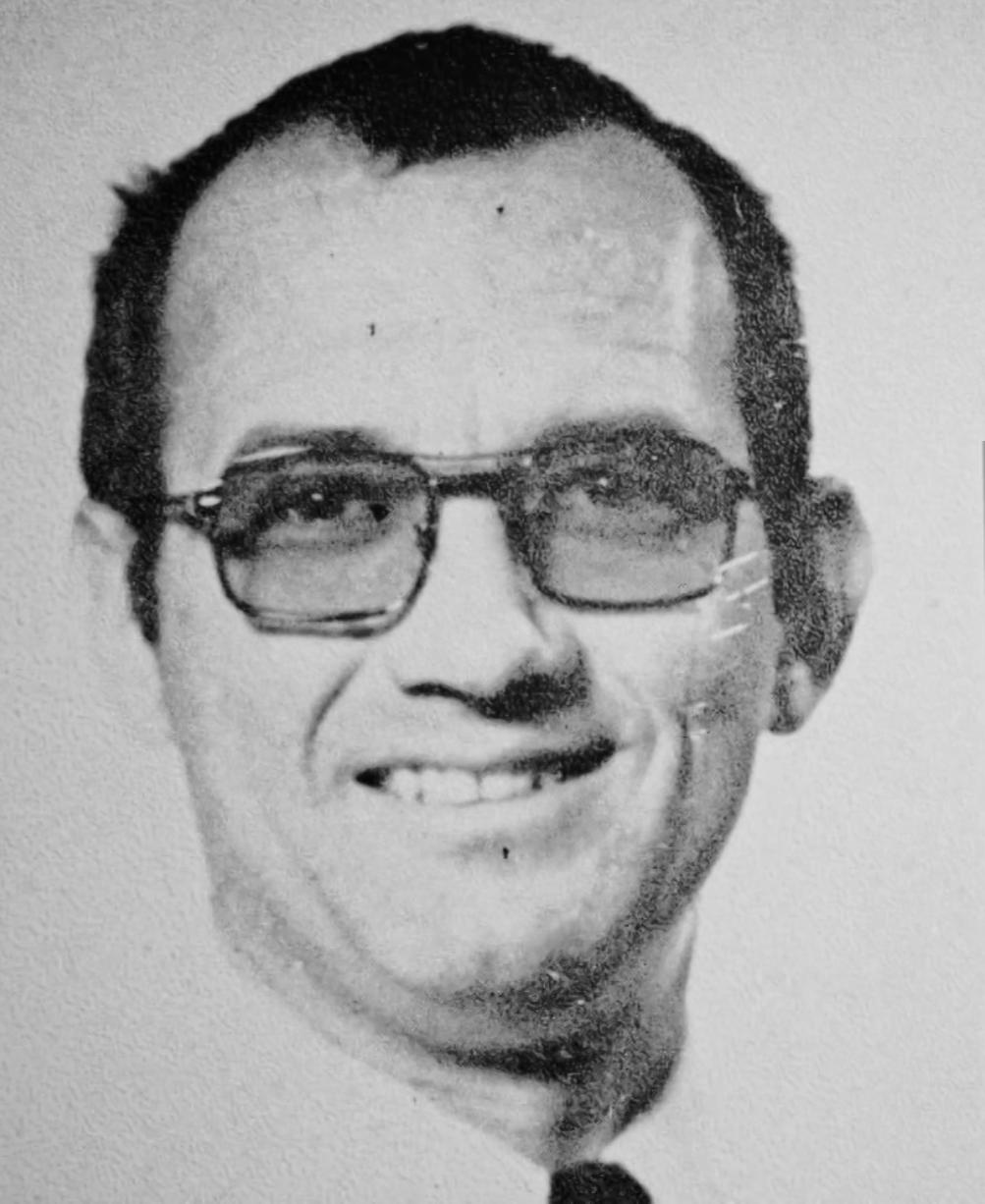
Undated photo of Kearney used on a wanted flyer issued during his fugitive state

LaMay's remains were found on March 18, 1977. Police had actually been to Kearney's home for the LaMay investigation prior to Chance's kidnapping and murder. During this visit they were invited into the home but were told to wait until Kearney and Hill could make themselves presentable. When Kearney and Hill had left, the deputies clipped fibers from the carpet to compare with evidence.

Once Kearney and Hill returned, they listened to the news of LaMay's death. Kearney decided to tell the deputies that he and Hill were in fact homosexuals and that they were also fearful of being murdered. Kearney continued on about how there had been an increase in murders in recent years targeting homosexuals and that they both had had homosexual relationships with LaMay over a period of two years.

Following the visit, the fibers the deputies had collected were compared to that of the green threads found by investigators stuck to the nylon tape that had been used on the trash sacks to close them and matched. Due to the nature of how the fibers were pulled, deputies were required to do an additional search. On May 3, the deputies visited Kearney and Hill's residence to obtain carpet fibers. During this visit, the deputies had also asked for pubic hair samples from both Kearney and Hill. Investigators also discovered a hacksaw that was covered in dried blood.

The carpet fibers and pubic hair found on LaMay's body matched that of Kearney. The blood found on the hacksaw had come back positive for LaMay's blood type.

Following the visit, in May Kearney and Hill had mailed a letter to Kearney's grandmother in Barstow to sell their home and pay their bills, as they were moving.

The police soon had also discovered that LaMay had been seen in the company of Kearney and Hill. Warrants were issued for the arrest of Kearney and Hill on June 3. On May 26, Kearney had sent a letter of resignation to his job as well as his security badge, and the two fled to El Paso, Texas. The fugitives' families persuaded the pair to return and to turn themselves in. Kearney surrendered at the Riverside County Sheriff's Office on July 1, 1977. Following his surrender, he pointed at a wanted poster and claimed to be the suspect. Kearney and Hill were put on a $500,000 bond.

David Hill, 36 years old at the time, was eventually cleared of any involvement in Kearney's crimes and was released.

Kearney made a full confession, initially admitting to a total of 28 murders and subsequently to seven more. In order to avoid a death sentence, he agreed to plead guilty. Kearney was charged with twenty-one counts of murder and, as agreed, pleaded guilty. He was given twenty-one life sentences. Police are certain that Kearney was responsible for the other seven murders he had admitted to but lacked the physical evidence to charge him.

Following Kearney's sentencing, he alleged that there were other people involved with his murders and that they could be found within police custody. Kearney stated, "They should have obtained quite a few while investigating other cases similar to mine. You might find photos of some of the alleged victims of my case. You should especially look for movies showing live torture or evisceration."

As of September 2025, Kearney is incarcerated at California's Mule Creek State Prison.

== See also ==
- List of serial killers in the United States
- List of serial killers by number of victims
- William Bonin, another serial killer in 1970s California known as the "Freeway Killer"
- Randy Kraft, another serial killer in 1970s California known as the "Freeway Killer"
- List of people sentenced to more than one life imprisonment
