= Fallen Angel (disambiguation) =

A fallen angel, in Abrahamic religions, is an angel that has been exiled or banished from Heaven.

Fallen Angel or The Fallen Angel may also refer to:

== Film ==
- Fallen Angel (1945 film), a film-noir by Otto Preminger
- Fallen Angel (1981 film), a TV film starring Dana Hill
- Fallen Angel, a 1991 TV film starring Michael Chow
- Fallen Angel, 1997, featuring George Buck Flower
- Fallen Angel (2003 film), a TV film starring Gary Sinise and Joely Richardson
- Gram Parsons: Fallen Angel, a 2004 documentary about Gram Parsons
- The Fallen Angel (2010 film), a Japanese film by Genjiro Arato

== Novels ==
- The Fallen Angel (novel), 2012, by Daniel Silva
- Angel of Ruin, 2001, by Kim Wilkins, released in the UK as Fallen Angel
- Fallen Angel, by Howard Fast
- Fallen Angel, 1954, featuring the fictional detective Kosuke Kindaichi

== Music ==
=== Albums ===
- Fallen Angel (Uriah Heep album) or the title song, 1978
- Fallen Angel (Webb Pierce album) or the title song, 1960
- Fallen Angel (Ari Abdul EP), 2022
- Fallen Angel (Jennie EP) or the title song (see below), 2026
- Fallen Angel by 25 ta Life, 2006
- Fallen Angel, by Maxim Reality, 2005
- Fallen Angel, by Punky Meadows, 2016
- Fallen Angel, by Versailles Suicide, or the title song, 2002

=== Songs ===
- "Fallen Angel" (Jennie song), 2026
- "Fallen Angel" (King Crimson song), 1974
- "Fallen Angel" (Poison song), (1988)
- "Fallen Angel" (Robbie Robertson song), 1987
- "Fallen Angel" (Rogue song), 1975; covered by Frankie Valli (1976)
- "Fallen Angel" (Three Days Grace song), 2015
- "Fallen Angel" (Tix song), 2021
- "Fallen Angel" (Traci Lords song), 1995
- "Fallen Angel", by Aldo Nova from Twitch, 1985
- "Fallen Angel", by Alphaville from Forever Young, 1984
- "Fallen Angel", by Alvin Lee and Mylon Lefevre from On the Road to Freedom, 1973
- "Fallen Angel", by Anri from Trouble in Paradise, 1986
- "Fallen Angel", by Barbara Dickson, 1978
- "Fallen Angel", by Blue Öyster Cult from Cultösaurus Erectus, 1980
- "Fallen Angel", by Bulldozer from The Day of Wrath, 1984
- "Fallen Angel", by Chris Brown from Exclusive, 2007
- "Fallen Angel", by Coney Hatch from Outa Hand, 1983
- "Fallen Angel", by Debbie Gibson from Out of the Blue, 1987
- "Fallen Angel", by Diamond Head from All Will Be Revealed, 2005
- "Fallen Angel", by Elbow from Cast of Thousands, 2003
- "Fallen Angel", by Esham from Judgement Day, 1992
- "Fallen Angel", by Fallen Angel from Stand United, 2024
- "Fallen Angel", by Jag Panzer from the re-release of Ample Destruction, 1984
- "Fallen Angel", by John Entwistle from Too Late the Hero, 1981
- "Fallen Angel", by Ketty Lester, 1963
- "Fallen Angel", by Kit Hain from School for Spies, 1983
- "Fallen Angel", by Neil Young from Mirror Ball, 1995
- "Fallen Angel", by Possessed from Seven Churches, 1985
- "Fallen Angel", by Sirenia from The Enigma of Life, 2011
- "Fallen Angel", by Styx from Brave New World, 1999
- "Fallen Angel", by Treat, 1986
- "The Fallen Angel", by Iron Maiden from Brave New World, 2000
- "(She's Just A) Fallen Angel", by Starz from Starz, 1976

== Television ==
- Fallen Angel (British TV series), a 2007 series based on the Roth trilogy by Andrew Taylor
- Fallen Angel (Singaporean-Malaysian TV series), a 2007 series starring Shaun Chen
- "Fallen Angel" (Altered Carbon), a 2018 episode
- "Fallen Angel" (Ballykissangel), a 1996 episode
- "Fallen Angel" (The X-Files), a 1993 episode
- "Fallen Angel", an episode of Xena: Warrior Princess
- "Fallen Angel", an episode of Charlie's Angels
- "Fallen Angel", an episode of Kamen Rider Hibiki
- "Fallen Angel", an episode of Teenage Mutant Ninja Turtles
- "Fallen", the finale of the Apple TV show Servant, as it refers to Leanne Grayson being a fallen angel by the Cult of Lesser Saints

== Other uses ==
- Sacred 2: Fallen Angel, a 2008 fantasy role-playing video game
- Fallen Angel (comics), an American fictional comic book heroine
- Fallen angel (cocktail), a gin cocktail
- The Fallen Angel (painting), 1847, by Alexandre Cabanel
- Christopher Daniels or The Fallen Angel (born 1970), professional wrestler
- Fallen Angel, a moniker used by the person who sent the 2003 ricin letters in the US
- Fallen angel, a term for a company whose credit rating has been downgraded from investment-grade to high-yield/junk status

== See also ==
- Fallen Angels (disambiguation)
- Ángel caído (disambiguation)
- Angel of Darkness (disambiguation)
- Angels Fall (disambiguation)
- Dark Angel (disambiguation)
- Evil Angel (disambiguation)
- Falling Angel, a 1978 novel by William Hjortsberg
- Category:Fallen angels
