= Dark Angel =

Dark Angel may refer to:

== Film ==
- The Dark Angel (1925 film), an American silent film starring Ronald Colman and Vilma Banky
- The Dark Angel (1935 film), an American film starring Fredric March and Merle Oberon
- The Dark Angels (1937 film), a French film directed by Willy Rozier
- Dark Angel (1990 film), or I Come in Peace, a science fiction thriller featuring Dolph Lundgren
- Dark Angel: The Ascent, a 1994 film starring Angela Featherstone
- Dark Angel (1996 film), a TV detective film starring Eric Roberts
- Bettie Page: Dark Angel, a 2004 biographical film

== Literature ==
=== Comics ===
- Dark Angel (DC Comics), a character in Wonder Woman comics
- Dark Angel (Marvel Comics) or Shevaun Haldane, a superheroine from the Marvel Comics imprint Marvel UK
- Warren Worthington III or Dark Angel, a character in Marvel Comics' X-Men
- Dark Angel or Kathisul Evin, a character and herald of Galactus in Marvel UK's Cyberspace 3000
- Dark Angel, a 1992–1997 manga by Kia Asamiya

=== Fiction ===
- Dark Angel (Andrews novel), a 1986 novel by V. C. Andrews, the second installment in the Casteel Family series
- Dark Angel, a 1990 novel by Sally Beauman
- Dark Angel, a 1994 novel by Mary Balogh
- Dark Angel (Dale novel), a 1995 novel by John Dale
- Dark Angel, a 1996 novel by L. J. Smith, the fourth installment in the Night World series
- Dark Angel, a 1998 novel by Donna Ball
- Dark Angel, a 2003 novel by Lynne Graham
- Dark Angel, a 2003 novel by Brian John, the third installment in the Angel Mountain Saga
- Dark Angel, a 2004 novel by Geoffrey Archer
- Dark Angel, a 2005 novel by Karen Harper, the third installment in the Maplecreek Amish trilogy
- Dark Angel, a 2005 novel by David Klass
- Dark Angel (Swedish: Den mörka ängeln), a 2008 novel by Mari Jungstedt
- Dark Angel, a 2016 novel by Stephanie Bedwell-Grime
- Dark Angel, a 2017 novel by Joseph Badal
- Dark Angel, a 2021 novel by Chris Simms
- Dark Angel, a 2023 novel by John Sandford
- Dark Angels, a 2006 novel by Karleen Koen
- Dark Angels, a 2009 novel by Katherine Langrish
- The Dark Angel (Waltari novel), a 1952 novel by Mika Waltari
- The Dark Angel (French: Passage du désir), a 2004 novel by Dominique Sylvain
- The Dark Angel, a 2018 novel by Elly Griffiths
- The Dark Angel, a 2023 novel by Kathryn Le Veque
- The Darkangel Trilogy, a 1982–1990 trilogy of fantasy novels by Meredith Ann Pierce

=== Poetry ===
- "The Dark Angel", an 1894 poem by Lionel Johnson

== Music ==
- Dark Angel (band), an American thrash metal band
- Dark Angel (Lee Hyori album)
- "Dark Angel", a song by Blue Rodeo from Five Days in July
- "Darkangel", a song by VNV Nation from Empires
- "Dark Angel", a song by Benny Joy
- "Dark Angel", a 1996 song by Electronic from Raise the Pressure
- Dark Angel, a 2015 EP by SpaceGhostPurrp
- ”Dark Angel”, a 2018 song by Provoker

== Television ==
- Dark Angel (American TV series), an American science fiction series starring Jessica Alba
- Dark Angel (British TV series), a 2016 British true crime television mini-series
- "Dark Angel", a 1972 episode of Kung Fu
- The Dark Angel, a 1989 British serial based on Uncle Silas by J. Sheridan Le Fanu

== Videos games ==
- Dark Angel (video game), a 2002 video game based on the 2000 TV series
- Dark Angel: Vampire Apocalypse, a 2001 hack-and-slash video game

== Other uses ==
- Dark Angel (horse), an Irish-bred, British-trained Thoroughbred
- Dark Angel (wrestler) or Sarah Stock, Canadian professional wrestler
- Detroit Dark Angels, women's semi-professional American football team
- Angel Gabriele or Dark Angel (1956–2016), American comic book creator and professional wrestling manager
- Dark Angel (Utah), a rock column in Arches National Park, Utah, U.S.
- Dark Angel (Shadowrun), a 1993 adventure for the role-playing game Shadowrun
- The Dark Angel, stage name for American professional wrestler Ox Baker (1934–2014)

== See also ==
- Angel of Darkness (disambiguation)
- Dark Angael, a 1997 video game
- Evil Angel (disambiguation)
- Fallen angel (disambiguation)
