= Randy Kraft =

American serial killer (born 1945)

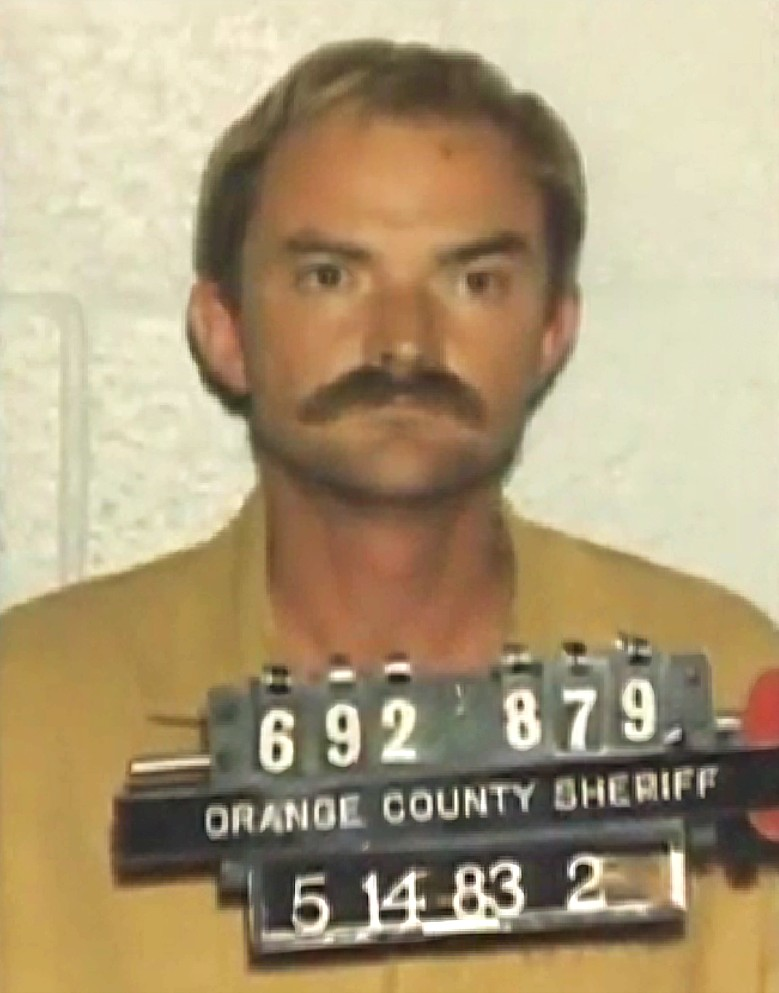
- 1983 mug shot of Kraft
- Born: Randy Steven Kraft; March 19, 1945 (age 81); Long Beach, California, U.S.
- Other names: The Freeway Killer, Southern California Strangler, The Scorecard Killer
- Education: Claremont Men's College
- Motive: Sexual sadism; Rape; Possession; Control; Opportunism
- Convictions: First degree murder with special circumstances (16 counts); Sodomy (1 count); Sexual mayhem (1 count)
- Penalty: Death

Details
- Victims: 16–67
- Span of crimes: 1971–1983
- Country: United States
- States: California; Oregon; Michigan
- Date apprehended: May 14, 1983
- Imprisoned at: California Institution for Men

Randy Steven Kraft (born March 19, 1945) is an American serial killer and rapist known as the Scorecard Killer, the Southern California Strangler, and the Freeway Killer, who committed the rape, torture, and murder of a minimum of sixteen young men across Southern California between 1972 and 1983. He is also believed to be responsible for the murders of up to fifty-one other young men and boys in cases spanning between 1971 and 1982 in California, Oregon and Michigan.

Kraft was brought to trial for sixteen murders committed within California at the Orange County Superior Court in September 1988; he was convicted of all sixteen counts of murder, plus one count of sodomy and one count of sexual mayhem, in May 1989 and is currently incarcerated on death row at the California Institution for Men, in San Bernardino County, California.

Kraft became known as the "Scorecard Killer" because upon his arrest, investigators discovered a coded list with sixty-one entries on a scorecard containing cryptic references to his victims; he is also sometimes referred to as the "Freeway Killer" because many of his victims' bodies were discovered beside or near freeways.

== Early life ==
=== Childhood ===
Randy Kraft was born in Long Beach, California, on March 19, 1945, the fourth child and only son of Opal Lee (née Beal) and Harold Herbert Kraft. Kraft's father had moved to California from Wyoming weeks after the United States' entry into World War II. Upon finding employment as a production operative at Douglas Aircraft Company, he was joined by his wife and three daughters.

The Kraft family lived modestly, and Kraft's mother took several jobs to supplement her husband's assembly-line salary. Kraft's mother initially found employment as a seamstress in a Westminster garment factory before later obtaining employment as a cook in a local school. Nonetheless, Opal Kraft always found time for her children; in contrast, Kraft's father seldom attended any social gatherings with them and was later described as being "distanced" from his family. As a child, Kraft was doted on by his three older sisters and mother, although he was known to be accident-prone.

In 1948, the Kraft family moved from Long Beach to Midway City in neighboring Orange County. Their home was a small, wood-frame Women's Army Corps dormitory on Beach Boulevard that Kraft's father renovated into a three-bedroom house. The family became active in the Westminster First Presbyterian Church, with Kraft's mother rising to the chairman of the deacons committee.

In Midway City, Kraft attended Midway City Elementary school, where his mother was a member of the PTA. His intelligence was noted by classmates and teachers and by 1957, Kraft was judged intelligent enough to attend accelerated classes at 17th Street Junior High School.

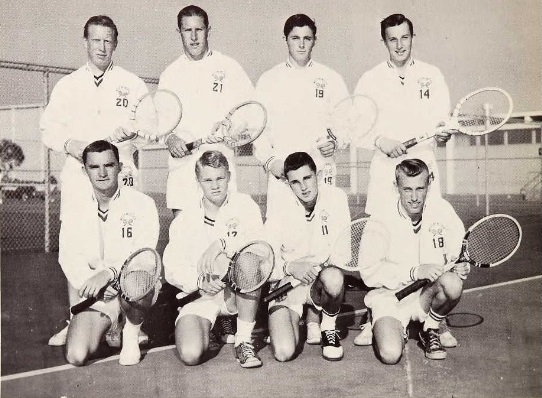
Kraft (bottom left), pictured in the 1963 Westminster High School yearbook, Citadel

=== Adolescence and graduation ===
By adolescence, Kraft had taken a keen interest in politics, becoming a staunch Republican and aspiring to become a U.S. senator. Shortly after his enrollment at Westminster High School, he and two close friends founded the Westminster World Affairs Club. At Westminster High, Kraft was again regarded as a pleasant, bright student who regularly achieved A grades in addition to being a varsity tennis player. He was also known to occasionally date girls, although some classmates and teachers later stated that they had suspected Kraft was homosexual.

Kraft (standing, center), pictured in the grounds of Claremont Men's College in 1964

Kraft later stated he had known from his high school days that he was homosexual, although he initially kept his sexual orientation a secret—frequently feigning an interest in girls when in the company of male peers. On June 13, 1963, he graduated tenth in his class of 390 students. At the time of Kraft's graduation, he was dating a girl one year his junior named Sybil Wiles, whom he took to the high school prom. Wiles would prove to be final girl Kraft dated. That fall, he enrolled at Claremont Men's College in Claremont, California, where he pursued a Bachelor of Arts degree in economics.

== Claremont Men's College ==
Shortly after his enrollment at Claremont, Kraft enrolled in the Reserve Officers Training Corps and regularly attended demonstrations in support of the Vietnam War and—in 1964—campaign rallies for Republican presidential candidate Barry Goldwater. He later declared these actions were merely a simulation of his parents' political views and not his own, describing his second year at Claremont as being when he abandoned the "last gasp" of his conservative ideology. The same year, Kraft entered his first known homosexual relationship.

In 1964, Kraft began working as a bartender at a local Garden Grove cocktail lounge that catered to gay clientele; he was also known to regularly travel to Laguna Beach and Huntington Beach to have casual sex with hustlers. In an apparent tentative effort to reveal his sexual orientation to his parents, Kraft took a succession of male "friends" to meet his family during his years at Claremont. Initially, Kraft's parents and sisters were oblivious to his homosexuality.

In 1966, Kraft was arrested and charged with lewd conduct after propositioning an undercover police officer in Huntington Beach; as he had no previous criminal record, no charges were filed. The following year, he developed a radical shift in his political beliefs, becoming an ardent supporter of liberal views and eventually registering as a Democrat in 1967. Kraft quickly became a Democratic Party organizer, campaigning tirelessly for the election of Robert F. Kennedy and receiving a personal letter from the senator thanking him for his efforts.

By his senior year, Kraft had become a lackadaisical student, drinking, taking drugs, and regularly attending all-night gambling and poker sessions with other students. The lack of commitment to his studies in his final year resulted in Kraft's failing to graduate from Claremont in June 1967 and being forced to repeat his econometrics class, which postponed his graduation by eight months. In February 1968, Kraft graduated from Claremont Men's College with a Bachelor of Arts degree in economics.

== U.S. Air Force ==
Four months after graduating from college, Kraft joined the United States Air Force. He was sent to basic training in Texas before being stationed at Edwards Air Force Base in Southern California, where he supervised the painting of test planes. During his service in the Air Force, Kraft rose to the rank of Airman First Class and supervisor-manager.

The same year that Kraft became an Airman First Class, he came out to his family. In a letter he wrote to a friend, Kraft described his father as having flown "into a rage," whereas he described his mother as being more understanding, if somewhat disapproving. Kraft's family ultimately accepted his sexuality, and he remained in close contact with his parents and siblings, although his siblings noted he began to "distance himself" from his family after he had disclosed his sexuality to them.

On July 26, 1969, Kraft announced his sexual orientation to his superiors. He was then granted a general discharge after only thirteen months of service. His dismissal was officially listed as being on "medical" grounds. In response, Kraft sought legal advice from an attorney to challenge the grounds regarding his discharge. The Air Force, however, refused to change the status of his discharge. Following his discharge, Kraft moved back into his parents' home and obtained work as a bartender.

=== First known sexual assault ===
In March 1970, Kraft encountered a 13-year-old Westminster youth named Joseph Alvin Fancher at Huntington Beach. Fancher explained to Kraft that he had run away from home that day. Kraft invited the youth to his apartment, promising that Fancher could live with him and offering him sex with a woman he claimed to know. Fancher agreed and accompanied Kraft to his Belmont Shore apartment, where he was drugged, beaten, and repeatedly sexually assaulted. Hours later, Fancher escaped from the apartment after Kraft left to go to work. A member of the public, alarmed by Fancher's drugged and disheveled condition, called an ambulance. Fancher's stomach needed to be pumped.

At the hospital, Fancher informed police that Kraft had given him drugs and beaten him. He did not disclose to either his parents or the police that he had been sexually assaulted due to shame and fearing no one would believe him. A search of Kraft's apartment was conducted with the cooperation of his roommate. However, as Fancher had confessed to police he had taken the pills offered to him voluntarily and the officers had searched without a warrant, no charges were filed.

=== Enrollment at California State University ===
In 1971, Kraft found new employment as a forklift driver in Huntington Beach. After his military discharge two years earlier, he enrolled at California State University, Long Beach, majoring in education to further his career prospects. There, Kraft became acquainted with Jeffrey Paul Graves, a fellow teaching student from Minnesota four years younger than Kraft, with whom he began a relationship.

== Murders ==
Between 1971 and 1983, Kraft is believed to have killed 67 people. All of his suspected victims were males between the ages of 14 and 30, the majority of whom were in their late teens to mid-twenties. Kraft was charged with—and convicted of—sixteen of these homicides, all of which had occurred between 1972 and 1983. Many of his victims were members of the United States Marines Corps, and most of their bodies were found to have high levels of both alcohol and tranquilizers, indicating they had been unconscious when they were abused and killed.

Kraft's victims were typically lured into his vehicle with an offer of a lift or alcohol. The victims would be plied with alcohol and/or other drugs. They were then bound, tortured, and sexually abused before they were killed, usually by either strangulation, asphyxiation, or bludgeoning. However, some victims had also ingested lethal doses of pharmaceuticals. At least one victim was stabbed to death. The victims would then be discarded, usually—though not exclusively—alongside or close to various freeways in Southern California. Photographic evidence found at Kraft's home indicates several of his victims were driven to his house before their murder.

Many of the victims were burned with a car cigarette lighter, usually around the genitals, chest, and face, and several were found with extensive blunt force trauma to the face and head. In several instances, foreign objects were found inserted into the victims' rectums, while other victims had suffered emasculation, or mutilation and dismemberment.

The majority of Kraft's murders were committed in California, although at least six victims had been killed in Oregon, with two further known victims murdered in Michigan in December 1982.

=== First suspected murder victim ===
On October 5, 1971, police found the nude body of a 30-year-old Long Beach resident named Wayne Joseph Dukette discarded close to the Ortega Highway. Dukette, a bartender at a gay bar named The Stable in nearby Sunset Beach, had last been seen alive on September 20. Putrefaction had destroyed any signs of foul play on the body. The cause of death was listed as acute alcohol poisoning due to a high blood alcohol level. The first entry in Kraft's journal (referred to as his "scorecard") reads "Stable," leading investigators to believe Dukette was Kraft's first murder victim.

=== Subsequent murders ===
Fifteen months after the death of Dukette, Kraft killed a 20-year-old Marine named Edward Daniel Moore. Moore was last seen leaving the barracks at Camp Pendleton on December 24, 1972. His body was found beside the 405 Freeway in Seal Beach during the early hours of December 26. Abrasions on Moore's body indicated he had been pushed from a moving vehicle. An autopsy revealed he had been bound at the wrists and ankles, then beaten with a blunt instrument about the face before being garroted. His body also exhibited numerous bite marks, and a sock had been forced into his rectum.

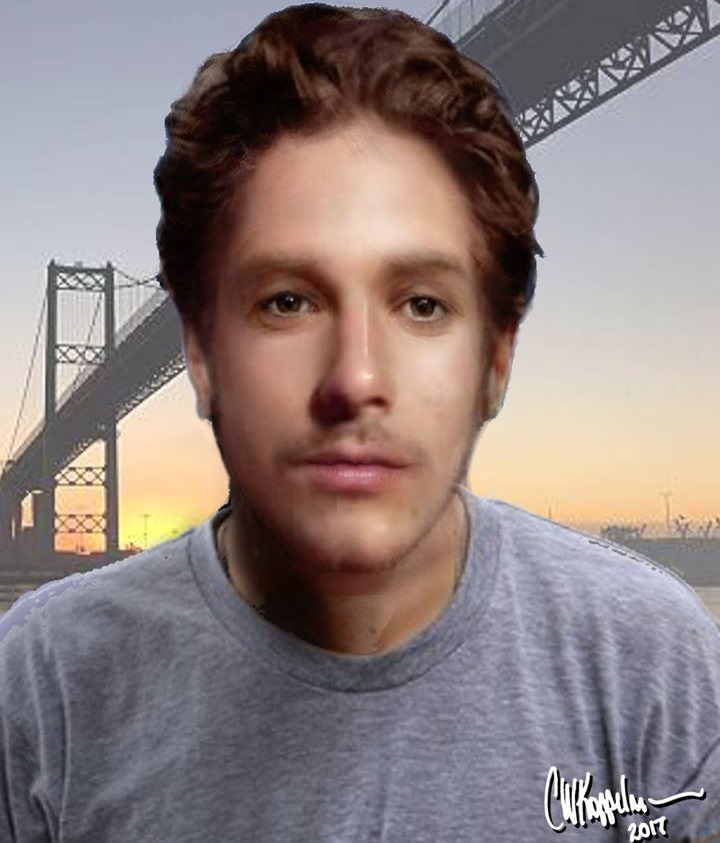
Forensic reconstruction of the first unidentified male located in Wilmington, California

Six weeks after the murder of Moore, on February 6, 1973, the body of an unidentified male, estimated to be between 17 and 25 years old, was found alongside the Terminal Island Freeway in Wilmington. This victim had been strangled with a ligature and also had a sock inserted in his rectum. Two months later, on April 14, the body of 17-year-old Kevin Clark Bailey was found beside a road in Huntington Beach. Bailey had been emasculated and sodomized prior to his murder. By July 28, a further two victims had been murdered: an unidentified youth whose dismembered body was found in Wilmington on April 22, and a 20-year-old named Ronnie Gene Wiebe, whose strangled body was found beside an on-ramp of the 405 Freeway on July 30, two days after he had disappeared.

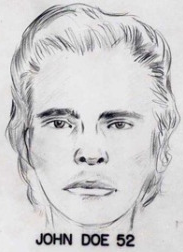
Early forensic sketch of the second unidentified male located in Wilmington, California

Kraft is known to have killed at least once more in 1973. The victim was a 23-year-old bisexual art student named Vincent Cruz Mestas, whose body was found in the San Bernardino Mountains on December 29. As with several previous victims, one of the victim's socks had been forced into his rectum. Mestas' hands had been severed from his body and were never found.

Between June and November 1974, five more victims had been found beside or close to major roadways in Southern California, three of whom had been conclusively linked to the same killer. Two of these victims, 20-year-old Malcolm Eugene Little and 19-year-old James Dale Reeves, were each found beside a freeway with foreign objects inserted into their bodies, whereas the body of the third victim, 18-year-old Marine Roger Edward Dickerson, bore evidence of bite marks much like several earlier victims. The fourth and fifth victims—Thomas Paxton Lee (25) and Gary Wayne Cordova (23)—were discovered on August 3 and November 29. Lee's strangled body was discovered midway down an embankment in Long Beach; Cordova's partially clothed body was discovered in Mission Viejo. His cause of death was ruled as being due to acute alcohol and diazepam ingestion.

=== 1975 ===
On January 3, 1975, Kraft abducted and murdered a 17-year-old high school student named John William Leras. The youth was last seen boarding a bus in Long Beach. His strangled body was found the following day, discarded at Sunset Beach with a foreign object protruding from his anus. Drag marks along the beach close to where his body was found suggested that two individuals had carried Leras's body into the water. Two weeks later, on January 17, the body of 21-year-old Craig Jonaitis was found in the parking lot of the Golden Sails Hotel near the Pacific Coast Highway and Loynes Drive in Long Beach. Jonaitis had been strangled to death with a length of string, possibly a shoelace.

=== Investigation ===
By January 1975, fourteen victims had been linked to the same killer, their bodies found across four counties over the previous three years. All the victims had been Caucasian males with similar physical characteristics. On January 24, homicide investigators from several jurisdictions in Southern California convened in Orange County to discuss their progress in the hunt for the unknown killer. An FBI profile of the killer shared with investigators described the individual as a methodical, organized lust killer of above-average intelligence who exhibited an indifference to the "interests and welfare of society."

Some investigators believed the murders to be the work of more than one individual, one or more of whom had a military background, as two victims had paper tissue residue in their nostrils, a procedure known to be used in the military to prevent bodies from purging after death. The insertion of socks inside the victims' rectums was also theorized to have been intended to prevent purging as the body was driven to the disposal location. At this stage, investigators had no solid suspects.

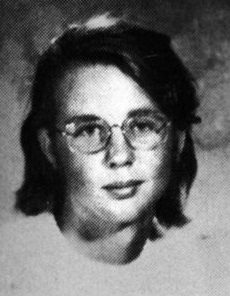
Keith Crotwell

Kent May

=== Murder of Keith Crotwell ===
On the evening of March 29, 1975, Kraft lured two youths, Keith Daven Crotwell (18) and Kent May (15), from a Long Beach parking lot into his Ford Mustang. May later recalled how he and Crotwell were initially wary of Kraft when he approached them from the direction of a known gay bar, but relaxed somewhat when Kraft—in response to a question from Crotwell as to what he thought about "queers"—claimed he "[hated]" homosexuals.

Inside Kraft's car, the two accepted an offer of beer and Valium before Kraft began driving in a random, aimless manner around Belmont Shore and Seal Beach. May later recalled rapidly feeling catatonic as a result of the Valium and alcohol he had ingested, then vaguely panicking as he realized Kraft hadn't ingested any Valium and had scarcely consumed any alcohol himself before he passed out in the back seat of the car.

In the parking lot where Crotwell and May had last been seen, two friends of the youths observed a distinctive black-and-white Mustang pull in and stop before the driver hastily opened the rear passenger door and pushed the unconscious (but otherwise unharmed) May out onto the pavement. The driver then sped away from the scene in the direction of 3rd Street. As he did so, the friends noted that Crotwell remained in the passenger seat, slumped against the unknown driver's shoulder.

On May 8, Crotwell's skull was found on a jetty close to the Long Beach Marina; the remainder of his body was found in a Laguna Hills culvert five months later. After hearing the news, the two friends of Crotwell and May, who suspected that the murderer was a patron of a Belmont Shore gay bar, searched their neighborhood for the distinctive Mustang. They found the car less than a mile (1.6 km) from their home, wrote down the license plate number, and gave the information to the police. The vehicle was registered to Randy Kraft.

=== Interrogation and release ===
Long Beach police questioned Kraft about Crotwell's abduction and murder on May 19, 1975. Initially, he denied having ever met either Crotwell or May, and the police, skeptical of Kraft's denial, summoned him to the police station for further questioning. Kraft admitted that on or about March 29, he had encountered two youths in the Long Beach parking lot in question and persuaded them to drink alcohol and consume Valium with him as he drove. He claimed to have returned May to the parking lot and then to have driven with Crotwell to a side road close to the El Toro offramp, where his car became embedded upon an embankment. He claimed to have walked alone to a gas station to call a tow truck while Crotwell remained with the car. Upon returning to his vehicle, Kraft claimed, Crotwell had disappeared.

Although Kraft's roommate confirmed that Kraft had phoned him on the date of Crotwell's disappearance, claiming that his vehicle was stuck on an embankment, detectives remained unconvinced by Kraft's version of events. The following week, two detectives attempted to file homicide charges against Kraft. However, the Los Angeles District Attorney's Office declined, citing the coroner's conclusion from his autopsy of the remains, which at that point consisted only of Crotwell's skull, that the youth had died of accidental drowning.

Whether because of the police attention or turmoil in his personal life in the summer of 1975, Kraft is not known to have killed again until December 31, when he abducted 22-year-old Mark Hall from a New Year's Eve party in San Juan Capistrano. In this instance, later described by prosecutors as "the worst" of all of Kraft's known murders, Hall was driven to a remote canyon in the Cleveland National Forest, where he was bound to a tree. The autopsy report listed the cause of death as asphyxiation caused by leaves and earth found lodged deep in Hall's trachea. The autopsy also revealed that Hall had been sodomized and emasculated, with his severed genitals inserted into his rectum. His chest, scrotum, nose, and cheeks had been burned with an automobile cigarette lighter, which was also used to destroy his eyes. The autopsy report also listed numerous incisions on Hall's legs which had been inflicted with a broken bottle. Forensic experts determined that Hall had been alive throughout much of the ordeal.

=== Relationship with Jeff Seelig ===
By 1976, Kraft had ended his relationship with Graves. Shortly thereafter, he began a relationship with a 19-year-old apprentice baker named Jeff Seelig, and the couple moved to Laguna Hills. Although neither man was inclined towards monogamy, the couple considered their relationship permanent. Seelig later told investigators that he and Kraft regularly picked up and propositioned hitchhikers who, if willing, would accompany them to their apartment for a threesome. However, Seelig was adamant that Kraft had never been violent toward him and he had never seen him display violent tendencies.

Kraft's relationship with Seelig is believed to be a contributory factor in the sudden lull in his murder spree. He is not known to have killed again until December 10, 1976. The body of the victim, 19-year-old Paul Joseph Fuchs, has never been found. Nonetheless, Fuchs' name is clearly listed upon Kraft's scorecard, and he was last seen outside Ripples, a gay bar Kraft is known to have frequented.

=== Resurfacing of the Freeway Killer ===
Following the December 1976 murder of Fuchs, Kraft is not known to have killed again for sixteen months. On January 3, 1978, homicide investigators again convened to discuss progress in the manhunt for the still-unidentified killer. By this time, investigators knew there was more than one murderer at large. Police had already arrested Patrick Kearney the previous July; Kearney subsequently confessed to the murders of twenty-eight boys and young men, many of whom he had dissected and discarded in trash bags beside freeways in Southern California. Although Kraft had also dismembered some of his victims, he had never shot them in the temple, as Kearney had done. Additionally, Kearney did not subject his victims to physical torture, which was a distinct feature of Kraft's modus operandi.

On April 16, 1978, Kraft abducted an 18-year-old Marine named Scott Michael Hughes. Hughes was plied with Valium before Kraft slit open his scrotum and removed one of his testicles, then strangled him to death with a ligature before discarding his fully clothed body—missing only his shoelaces—beside a freeway on-ramp in Anaheim. Two months later, on June 11, the body of 23-year-old Roland Gerald Young was found near a San Diego freeway. Young had been emasculated before being stabbed to death. Abrasions to his body indicated that he had been pushed from a vehicle traveling at high speed. Eight days later, the body of a 20-year-old Marine named Richard Allen Keith was found discarded beside a road on Moulton Parkway. He had last been seen alive by his girlfriend in the city of Carson. Welts on Keith's wrists indicated that he had been bound before he was strangled with a ligature. Froth in his throat indicated that he was also drowning as a result of flurazepam and alcohol he had consumed at the time he was strangled. Keith is believed to be referred to on Kraft's scorecard as "Marine Carson."

Three weeks after the murder of Keith, on July 6, Kraft killed a 23-year-old hitchhiker named Keith Arthur Klingbeil. Klingbeil had ingested large doses of acetaminophen and alcohol before he was strangled with his own shoelace. His body was subsequently discarded beside the Interstate 5 freeway. Although Klingbeil was still alive when discovered, he died shortly after his admission to Mission Community Hospital. The autopsy revealed that, before being strangled, Klingbeil's left nipple had been seared with a car cigarette lighter.

Two months later, on September 29, the body of 20-year-old Richard Anthony Crosby was found 200 yards north of Highway 71 in San Bernardino. Crosby had disappeared the previous day as he hitchhiked home from a theater in Torrance. He had been suffocated, and his left nipple had been mutilated with an automobile cigarette lighter.

The last known victim murdered by Kraft in 1978 was a 21-year-old Long Beach truck driver named Michael Joseph Inderbieten, whose castrated body was found along an on-ramp to the I-605 on November 18, 1978. In addition to having been castrated, Inderbieten had been violated with a foreign object and had suffered burns similar to those inflicted on victim Mark Hall two years previously. The cause of death was listed as suffocation.

=== Later murders ===
Kraft is not known to have killed again until June 16, 1979, when he abducted a 20-year-old Marine named Donnie Harold Crisel, whose body was thrown from a moving vehicle onto a northbound on-ramp to the 405 Freeway at Irvine Center Drive. The cause of death was listed as acute alcohol poisoning, although rope and burn marks indicated Crisel had been bound and tortured. (Note: Contemporary media records indicate investigators did link the murder of a 16-year-old Milpitas youth named Joseph Daly to the same perpetrator responsible for Crisel's murder. Daly's nude body was discovered discarded alongside a road in Carlsbad, San Diego County, on February 26, 1979, one day after his murder. Numerous abrasions upon his body indicated he had been thrown from a moving vehicle.)

Two months later, on August 29, the dismembered remains of a 21-year-old English tourist named Keith Anthony Jackson were found discarded in two trash bags and a cardboard box behind a Union 76 gas station in Long Beach. A sock was found inserted in his rectum. Only Jackson's head, torso and left leg were ever found. Jackson had been deceased for several days prior to the discovery of his body. The entry on Kraft's scorecard simply reading either "England" or "76" is believed to refer to him. Two weeks later, on September 14, the body of 19-year-old Gregory Wallace Jolley was found in Lake Arrowhead. Jolley had been emasculated and his head and legs had been severed after death. His possessions were later found in Kraft's home.

On November 24, 1979, a 15-year-old Santa Ana youth named Jeffrey Sayre is believed to have been abducted and murdered by Kraft. Sayre was last seen at a bus stop in Westminster while returning home from a date with his girlfriend. The bus stop was near the home of Kraft's parents. The entry "Westminster Date" on Kraft's scorecard is believed to refer to Sayre. On February 18, 1980, the decapitated body of a 19-year-old Marine named Mark Alan Marsh was found near the Templin Highway. Marsh was last seen hitchhiking towards Buena Park. His hands had been severed from his body after death.

=== Portland murders ===
In the summer of 1980, Kraft obtained employment with a Santa Monica-based aerospace firm as a data processing and programming expert; this employment occasionally required Kraft to travel to other states. In July, Kraft traveled to the neighboring state of Oregon on an extended business trip. During this trip, he lived in a town close to Portland. Before returning to California in August, he is believed to have murdered two more victims—both of whom were listed on his scorecard with cryptic references, including the word "Portland."

The first victim, a 17-year-old Denver youth named Michael Sean O'Fallon, was killed on July 17. O'Fallon had been on a solo hitchhiking trip across the U.S. and Canada before his enrollment at college at the time of his murder. He had consumed both alcohol and Valium before he was strangled to death. O'Fallon's nude, hogtied body was found ten miles south of Salem. O'Fallon was listed on Kraft's scorecard as "Portland Denver", and his Kodak camera, inscribed with his mother's initials, was later found in Kraft's garage. The following day, Kraft is believed to have killed a 30-year-old Vietnam veteran named Larry Eugene Parks, whose body, clothed but missing both belt and shoelaces, was found beside a freeway shoulder in the city of Woodburn. Parks was listed as "Portland Elk" on Kraft's scorecard. He had ingested a toxic level of Valium and Tylenol before he was strangled to death with a ligature.

On September 3, 1980, one month after Kraft's return to California from Oregon, the nude, bound body of a 19-year-old Marine named Robert Wyatt Loggins was found discarded in a trash bag close to the El Toro Marine air base. Loggins had last been seen alive by two fellow Marines close to the Pacific Coast Highway on August 23; he had been intoxicated. Nine photographs and their negatives subsequently found in Kraft's possession depict Loggins in Kraft's living room in various nude, pornographic poses. All these pictures depict Loggins with his eyes closed; it is unknown whether the victim was alive or dead when they were taken.

A Polaroid photograph of an unidentified victim sitting on Kraft's couch

On April 10, 1981, the body of a 17-year-old youth named Michael Cluck was found beside the Interstate 5 freeway close to Goshen, Oregon. Cluck had been abducted while hitchhiking from Kent, Washington to Bakersfield, California, a day earlier. Thirty-one blunt-force blows to the head had destroyed the back of his skull, killing the youth. Cluck had also been sodomized and savagely beaten, kicked, and scoured. Cluck is believed to have been recorded on Kraft's scorecard as "Portland Blood" due to the extensive amount of blood and debris found at the murder scene. At the time of the murder, Kraft was once again in Oregon on business. The day Cluck's body was discovered, Kraft visited a Lane County hospital to receive treatment for a bruised foot.

Four months after Cluck's murder, on August 20, 1981, the partially clothed body of 17-year-old male prostitute Christopher Allen Williams was found in the San Bernardino Mountains. Williams had ingested both phenobarbital and benzodiazepine, and was found with tissue paper lodged deep in his nostrils, causing him to choke to death on his own mucus.

=== Echo Park murders ===
By early 1982, Kraft and Seelig had been in a relationship for approximately six years, and the couple had resided in a Long Beach bungalow purchased largely via Kraft's income for three years. The mortgage payments were steep—thus resulting in Kraft in particular devoting increased hours to his work. Seelig also devoted extensive hours to his own senior employment roles in two candy and bakery stores. The increased separation between the two contributed to their relationship becoming marred by frequent fights and episodes of temporary separation. To resolve their personal differences, the couple began attending weekly counseling sessions in Huntington Beach, commencing on June 22, 1982.

Following complaints from residents of Echo Park regarding a foul odor emanating from the direction of the Hollywood Freeway on July 29, 1982, a Cal Trans employee found the decaying body of a 14-year-old Pittsburg, California youth named Raymond Davis discarded alongside the Rampart Boulevard offramp. Rudimentary efforts had been made to conceal Davis's body beneath leaves and soil. He had last been seen alive in Echo Park on June 17, searching for his missing dog. The youth's wrists had been knotted behind his back in much the same manner as victim Michael O'Fallon two years previously, and he had been strangled to death with his shoelace. The entry on Kraft's scorecard reading "Dog" is believed to refer to Davis. Just forty feet from Davis's body, the same Cal Trans crew also found the body of 16-year-old Robert Avila Jr. Avila had been missing since July 21, and his body was also markedly decomposed. He had been strangled to death with a length of stereo speaker wire. As Avila was a heavy deodorant user, the entry upon Kraft's scorecard reading "Deodorant" is believed to refer to Avila.

Kraft is not known to have killed again until November 1, 1982, when he abducted and murdered a 24-year-old Modesto man named Arne Mikeal Laine. Laine was last seen hitchhiking toward Orange County in search of work. His body was not found until January 1984, discarded on a hillside close to the town of Ramona. Four weeks after Laine's murder, on November 24, the semi-nude body of 26-year-old Brian Harold Whitcher was dumped from a moving vehicle alongside the Interstate 5 freeway, close to the city of Wilsonville, Oregon. Whitcher had ingested high levels of both alcohol and Valium, but he died of asphyxiation.

On December 3, 1982, a 29-year-old carpenter named Anthony Jose Silveira disappeared while hitchhiking toward Medford, Oregon. His body was found two weeks later, strangled, sodomized, and violated with foreign objects before his murder. At the time of the murders of both Whitcher and Silveira, Kraft was again known to have been in Oregon on a business trip, which concluded the day of Silveira's death. On December 4, Kraft drove from Portland to Seattle to visit friends. While there, he was observed wearing a military jacket inscribed with the name "Silveira". On December 5, Kraft flew from Seattle to Grand Rapids, Michigan, again on business.

=== Grand Rapids and return to Portland ===
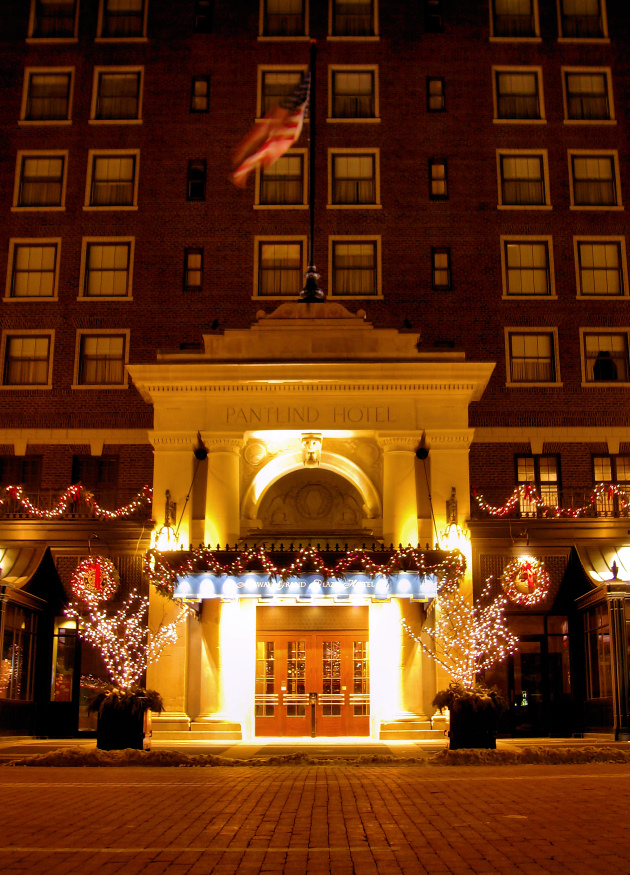
The Amway Grand Plaza Hotel. Kraft encountered Dennis Alt and Christopher Schoenborn at this hotel on December 7, 1982.

Two days after his arrival in Grand Rapids, Kraft encountered cousins Dennis Alt and Christopher Schoenborn at a seminar in the Amway Grand Plaza Hotel. Kraft was seen talking with the pair in the hotel's reception area shortly before midnight. Their bodies were discovered on December 9 in an open field close to the hotel. Both victims had been plied with alcohol and Valium before being sodomized and murdered, and their bodies had been arranged in sexually suggestive positions. Alt, 24, had died of asphyxiation, and Schoenborn, 20, had been strangled to death with his belt. A ballpoint pen had been inserted into Schoenborn's urethra before his murder. Both victims were recorded on Kraft's scorecard in a single entry reading "GR2". A set of keys belonging to Schoenborn, plus Silveira's military jacket, were left by Kraft in the hotel. (Note: Kraft had resided in the Amway Grand Plaza Hotel throughout his business trip to Grand Rapids. He provided a false address when registering at the hotel.)

On December 8, Kraft traveled from Michigan to Portland. Within twenty-four hours of his return to Oregon, he had killed a 19-year-old hitchhiker named Lance Taggs. Taggs had last been seen hitchhiking from the city of Tigard, Oregon to the home of a relative in Los Angeles. His body was discovered the following day alongside a rural road in Clackamas County, close to where the body of Whitcher had been found two weeks earlier. As with Alt and Schoenborn, Taggs had consumed alcohol and Valium before his murder, although Taggs had died of suffocation caused by a sock thrust into his trachea.

=== Connection of Oregon murders to manhunt ===
Noting the passage of time between periods of activity when bodies of young males had been found discarded near mass transportation with alcohol and/or pharmaceuticals in their bloodstream in Oregon, investigators theorized that their killer resided in another state and struck in Oregon only when there on business. Following the murders of Whitcher, Silveira, and Taggs, Oregon investigators relayed details of the murders to police in other states, describing the modus operandi of the killer they were seeking and requesting feedback from any police force that had unsolved murders of young males on their files with similar characteristics. A response from Southern California counties was swift: the pattern of killings was identical to victims linked to the unknown killer in California. The six Oregon murders committed by Kraft were thus linked to the murders he had committed in California.

Upon establishing a connection with the ongoing California manhunt, and theorizing the perpetrator likely rented a vehicle when out of state, in the spring of 1983, Oregon investigators obtained all records of gasoline receipts purchased by drivers of rented or out-of-state vehicles in all service stations along the I-5 freeway on the dates the six Oregon victims had been murdered. This information was processed into—and collated via—a computer database, and investigators began tracing the movements of all out-of-state males whose names appeared more than once in the report—prioritizing individuals who resided in Southern California. (Note: These records revealed Kraft had purchased gasoline at service stations along the I-5 freeway on eighteen occasions on the dates the six Oregon victims had been murdered.)

=== 1983 ===
The body of Eric Church, as discovered alongside the I-605 freeway, January 27, 1983

Kraft did not kill again until the early hours of January 27, 1983, when he abducted a 21-year-old hitchhiker named Eric Herbert Church, who was last seen alive hitchhiking from Orange County to Sacramento the afternoon prior to his murder. His body was found in a field alongside an on-ramp to the I-605 freeway in Seal Beach. An autopsy concluded Church had consumed high levels of alcohol and Valium and that he had been sodomized. Rope marks on Church's wrists indicated he had struggled against his restraints before he died of a combination of ligature strangulation and numerous blows to the side of his skull inflicted by a blunt instrument.

On February 12, Kraft killed two Buena Park men: 18-year-old Geoffrey Alan Nelson and 20-year-old Rodger James DeVaul Jr. The two were last seen outside the house of a friend of Nelson's named Bryce Wilson in Cypress shortly before midnight on February 11, when they told Wilson they intended to purchase something to eat.

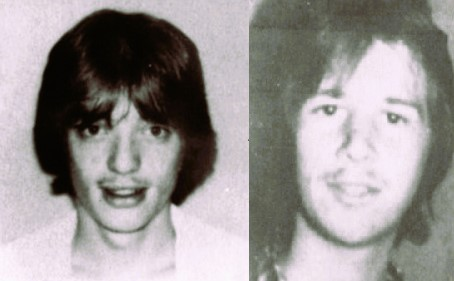
Rodger DeVaul (left) and Geoffrey Nelson

Nelson's nude body was found discarded face-down alongside an on-ramp close to the Garden Grove Freeway by an off-duty police officer named Donald Batchelder at 5:20 a.m. on February 12. He had been emasculated, strangled, and thrown from a moving vehicle. DeVaul's body was found the following afternoon, discarded down a mountainside close to Mount Baldy in San Bernardino County. He had been bound, sodomized, and strangled with a cord. As had been the case with Nelson, DeVaul had ingested both alcohol and propranolol before his murder. In addition, the stomachs of both victims contained potato skins and grapes, which had been eaten shortly before their murders.

== Final murder and arrest ==
At 1:10 a.m. on May 14, 1983, two California Highway Patrol officers observed a Toyota Celica driving erratically on Interstate 5 in the Orange County community of Mission Viejo. Observing the vehicle perform an illegal lane change, the officers, suspecting the motorist was driving under the influence, signaled for the vehicle to stop. The driver slowed the vehicle to a halt, briefly reached across the passenger seat, then immediately exited the car—discarding the contents of a beer bottle onto the pavement as he did so—and walked briskly toward the patrol car. Officer Michael Sterling met the individual, who identified himself as Randy Kraft, at the front of his patrol car and observed that his jeans were unbuttoned. Sterling had Kraft perform a field sobriety test, which he failed. He then arrested Kraft for driving while intoxicated.

Sterling's partner, Sgt. Michael Howard approached the Celica and observed a young man slumped with his eyes closed in the vehicle's passenger seat, with his lap partially covered by a leather jacket. Several empty Moosehead beer bottles and an open prescription bottle of Lorazepam tablets were strewn around his feet, and a folded, five-inch buck knife lay upon the driver's seat. Howard attempted to wake the man. Receiving no response, Howard attempted to rouse the man by shaking his arm, only to note the individual had a low body temperature. Upon checking for a pulse, Howard noted the man was dead, with a ligature mark visible around his neck. Lifting the jacket from the victim's lap, Howard noted the victim's jeans had been unfastened and unzipped to expose his genitalia. In addition, the victim's hands had been bound with a shoelace, and his wrists bore evidence of welt marks. Later identified as Terry Lee Gambrel, a 25-year-old Marine stationed at El Toro air base, the victim had been strangled to death.

=== Evidence retrieval ===
Kraft was initially charged with driving under the influence of alcohol and was held in custody as detectives conducted a thorough search of his vehicle. Upon the car's rear seat, investigators found a belt, the width of which matched the bruising around Gambrel's neck. Other incriminating evidence retrieved included alcohol, tranquilizers, various prescription drugs, and stimulants. The passenger seat and carpet of the vehicle were heavily bloodstained; however, Gambrel had no open wounds. The upholstery was removed for forensic analysis, which confirmed the blood was human. Beneath the carpet, investigators discovered an envelope containing more than fifty photographs of young men in pornographic poses. Many of the subjects in the pictures appeared to be either asleep or dead. Inside the trunk, investigators found a ring binder containing a hand-written list of sixty-one coded notations.

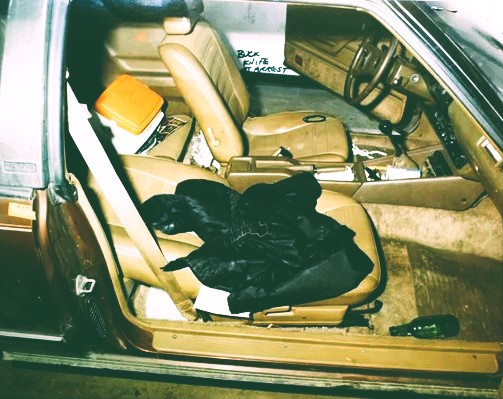
The interior of Kraft's Toyota Celica, as photographed following the vehicle's impoundment by the Orange County Sheriff's Department

A search of Kraft's home revealed further incriminating evidence, including clothes and personal possessions of numerous young men who had been murdered over the previous decade. Fibers taken from a rug matched those found on victim Scott Hughes. In addition, the couch in Kraft's living room was identified as being the one in the photographs found in Kraft's car. A roll of film discovered also contained shots of victims Eric Church and Rodger DeVaul sitting in Kraft's car. A ligature mark is clearly visible on DeVaul's neck in one of these images.

=== Scorecard ===
The coded list of sixty-one neatly printed terms and phrases found in the trunk of Kraft's car is believed to refer to each of Kraft's victims. Many entries appear innocuous, but each is believed to refer to a specific murder victim or double murder. Several entries reference victims' names (for example, the entry reading "EDM" refers to the initials of victim Edward Daniel Moore, whereas "Vince M" refers to victim Vincent Mestas). In other instances, entries indicate torture or mutilation inflicted upon victims' bodies and/or the locations where they were last seen. The entry "Marine Head BP," for example, is believed to refer to victim Mark Marsh; a Marine found decapitated, having been last seen hitchhiking towards Buena Park. Other entries simply refer to body dump locations; the entry "Golden Sails," for example, refers to the fact the body of Craig Jonaitis was found in the parking lot of the Golden Sails Hotel.

The list also contains entries indicating a minimum of four double murders: "GR2" (victims Dennis Alt and Christopher Schoenborn, last seen in Grand Rapids); "2 in 1 Beach" (victims Geoffrey Nelson and Rodger DeVaul); "2 in 1 Hitch" and "2 in 1 MV to PL" (neither entry of which has been linked to any double murder or disappearance).

Investigators contend that two victims of whose murders Kraft was convicted (Church and Gambrel) are not listed on Kraft's scorecard. However, since the list is in code, the possibility exists that Church, in particular, is included on the scorecard as an entry that investigators cannot recognize as referring to him. Gambrel may also be included on the list; although as Kraft was arrested while he attempted to dispose of the body, he may not have recorded an entry referring to Gambrel on his scorecard. These possibilities indicate the scorecard lists a minimum of sixty-five and possibly sixty-seven victims.

== Formal charges ==
On May 16, 1983, Kraft was formally charged with the murder of Gambrel. By September, investigators had interviewed over 700 witnesses and had gathered more than 250 physical exhibits which pointed towards Kraft's guilt in a further fifteen homicides committed between December 1972 and February 1983. He was formally charged with these fifteen murders—in addition to two counts of sodomy and one of emasculation—on September 8, 1983.

- Edward Daniel Moore (20) December 24, 1972
- Kevin Clark Bailey (17) April 9, 1973
- Ronnie Gene Wiebe (20) July 28, 1973
- Keith Daven Crotwell (18) March 29, 1975
- Mark Howard Hall (22) January 1, 1976
- Scott Michael Hughes (18) April 16, 1978
- Roland Gerald Young (23) June 11, 1978
- Richard Allen Keith (20) June 19, 1978
- Keith Arthur Klingbeil (23) July 6, 1978
- Michael Joseph Inderbieten (21) November 18, 1978
- Donnie Harold Crisel (20) June 16, 1979
- Robert Wyatt Loggins Jr. (19) August 23, 1980
- Eric Herbert Church (21) January 27, 1983
- Rodger James DeVaul Jr. (20) February 12, 1983
- Geoffrey Alan Nelson (18) February 12, 1983
- Terry Lee Gambrel (25) May 14, 1983

== Trial ==
Kraft, pictured on the first day of his trial

Kraft's trial began on September 26, 1988. He was tried at the Orange County Superior Court before Judge Donald A. McCartin. The prosecution consisted of Bryan Brown, who was assisted by Thomas Goethals; Kraft was defended by C. Thomas McDonald, James Merwin and William Kopeny. He pleaded not guilty to all charges.

At the trial, almost 160 witnesses were called to testify on behalf of the prosecution. Over 1,000 exhibits were introduced as evidence. These exhibits included physical evidence such as bloodstains, hair and fiber evidence found at Kraft's Long Beach residence and in his car; fingerprints found upon glass shards recovered from the Hall murder scene; negatives and photographs of victims found hidden inside Kraft's vehicle, which depicted the men either dead, drugged, or asleep; (Note: The background scenery in these images revealed the photographs had been taken at Kraft's home or as the victims were sat inside his car.) the belt used to strangle Gambrel; and the prescription drugs and buck knife found in his vehicle. Other evidence introduced included work and travel records and gasoline receipts, which placed Kraft in particular locations where victims had been abducted and/or discarded, and the numerous personal possessions of various murder victims found in Kraft's possession following his arrest.

Kraft's defense was primarily one of alibis and alternate suspects: his attorneys dismissed much of the evidence produced as being circumstantial and attempted to portray Kraft as an articulate, hardworking, and upstanding member of the community. They did not dispute that the sixteen men were murder victims yet argued that they were "victims of someone, but not Randy Kraft." The defense also pointed out that investigators had initially believed several of the sixteen victims to have been killed by one of two other serial killers, Patrick Kearney and William Bonin, and argued there was "no concrete evidence" that Kraft had killed any of the victims. (Note: Kraft had initially hoped to testify in his defense with regards to five of the sixteen murder charges; however, his defense decided against letting him do so.)

The trial lasted a total of thirteen months and would prove to be the most expensive trial in Orange County history. On April 29, 1989, each side opened their closing arguments, which lasted a total of three days: the prosecution again listing all the physical and circumstantial evidence pointing to Kraft's guilt; the defense arguing as to the circumstantial case put forward by the prosecution that all the murders were linked and accusing the prosecution of "glossing over" the truth.

=== Conviction ===
Following both counsels' closing arguments, the jury retired to consider their verdict. (Note: To avoid a potential mistrial, the jurors were sequestered from all forms of media exposure throughout their deliberations.) They would deliberate for eleven days before announcing, on May 12, that they had reached their verdict, finding Kraft guilty of sixteen counts of murder, one count of sodomy, and—in relation to victim Geoffrey Nelson—one count of sexual mayhem. On one additional count of sodomy concerning victim Rodger DeVaul, Kraft was found not guilty.

"To have something like this take place in our society, I [...] I think I've sent eight or nine individuals to their death in my courtroom before. I can take all those aggravating circumstances in those other cases and they don't match Mr. Kraft's record. I just can't comment. If anyone ever deserved the death penalty, he's got it coming."

— Judge Donald A. McCartin passing the death sentence upon Randy Kraft on November 29, 1989.

==== Penalty phase ====
On June 5, 1989, the same jury reconvened to hear further testimony from the prosecution and defense regarding Kraft's penalty. This phase of Kraft's trial would last until August, and it was at this point that the prosecution introduced evidence of several additional homicides committed in both Oregon and Michigan, which they were certain Kraft had also committed and for which he had not been tried in Orange County. The defense dismissed the prosecution's assertions as being "highly speculative" and introduced testimony relating to a PET scan conducted on Kraft which, they asserted, revealed abnormalities in the frontal lobes of his brain, therefore reducing his ability to control both his emotions and impulse. The prosecution rebuffed this testimony by stating to the jury: "There is nothing wrong with Mr. Kraft's mind other than that he likes killing for sexual satisfaction", adding that the fact that his family and friends had found it difficult to believe he had committed any murders simply showed "what a good salesman he is."

== Death penalty ==
On August 11, 1989, the jury rendered a verdict of death. Three months later, on November 29, Judge McCartin formally sentenced Kraft to death. Upon hearing the verdict, Kraft first questioned whether his conviction would be automatically referred to the Court of Appeal before declaring: "I have a few things to say. I wanted to say a lot more, but [my attorney] has advised me not to. I take his advice, but just briefly, I would like to say I have not murdered anyone, and I believe any reasonable review of the record will show that—that's all." Judge McCartin then declared the proceedings closed as the father of Mark Hall shouted, "Burn in hell Kraft. Turn around so we can see you."

== Incarceration ==
Kraft was detained on death row at San Quentin State Prison, to await execution. He did appeal his sentence, although his convictions and sentencing were upheld by the California Supreme Court on August 9, 2000. San Quentin State Prison was later transformed from a maximum-security facility into a rehabilitation center focused on improving public safety through inmates' vocational training, rehabilitation, and education. As such, Kraft was later transferred to the California Institution for Men.

On November 5, 2026, the Governor of California, Gavin Newsom, announced his intention to commute the sentences of all 548 of California's death row inmates to terms of life imprisonment without the possibility of parole.

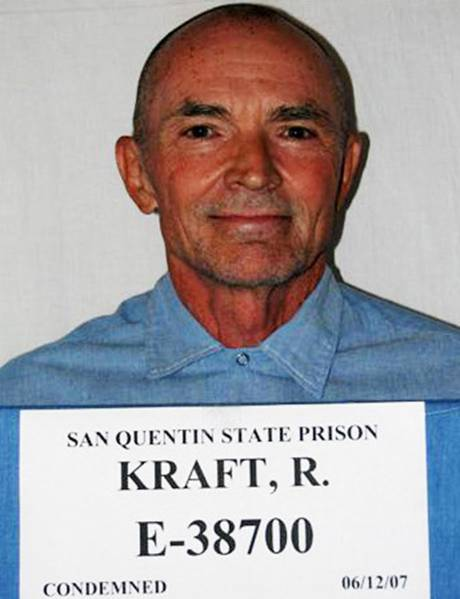
Mug shot of Kraft, taken in 2007

As of 2026, Kraft remains incarcerated at the California Institution for Men. Although he admits to having encountered several victims shortly before their murders, he continues to deny responsibility for any of the homicides he was either convicted of or is suspected of committing. (Note: While capital punishment remains theoretically legal in California, in practice the death penalty has been banned in the state since 2006, when a U.S. Federal Court issued a permanent injunction against the practice of execution. In 2019, Gavin Newsom ordered a moratorium on all executions within the state. Both orders remain in force as of 2026.)

== Potential unverified scorecard victims ==
By 1988, investigators had linked forty-three of the sixty-one entries upon Kraft's scorecard to identified and nameless young men murdered in the twelve years previous to Kraft's arrest, leaving eighteen entries referring to twenty unidentified and/or undiscovered murder victims.

Three further victims simply listed at trial as being entries "unconnected to any unsolved murder"—"Navy White," "Iowa," and "Hari Kari"—have since been identified and/or linked to four murder victims discovered in 1974 and 1975. (Note: The entry reading "Iowa" has been linked to two separate murder victims identified in 2012 and 2023.) A further victim unidentified at trial yet linked to Kraft as an entry simply reading "76" due to the location of his body behind a Union 76 gas station has since been identified as Keith Jackson, a tourist from Manchester, England, meaning he may have been the entry in Kraft's journal logged as "England" as opposed to "76". These developments leave fifteen entries referring to seventeen unknown further victims upon Kraft's scorecard. This is due in part to his murders having occurred in several states, with bodies being discarded in varying locations, and several entries being cryptic.

The entry upon Kraft's scorecard reading "Navy White" is believed by investigators to refer to a 17-year-old named James Sean Cox, an apprentice medic stationed at Mather Air Force Base who was last seen on September 29, 1974, hitchhiking near Interstate 5 and whose body was found several weeks later in Rancho Santa Fe. Cox was dressed in his white Navy uniform at the time of his disappearance. In addition to the color of his uniform, Cox was a blond youth.

A further entry on Kraft's scorecard, simply reading "Iowa," is believed to refer to either an 18-year-old Marine named Oral Alfred Stuart Jr., who had been born in Iowa, or a 17-year-old Cedar Rapids native named Michael Ray Schlicht. Stuart's nude body was found discarded close to a Long Beach condominium adjacent to the I-605 on November 10, 1974; he had died as a result of blunt force trauma. His body remained unidentified until March 2012. Schlicht's body was discovered in Laguna Hills on September 14, 1974; he had died approximately four days prior to the discovery of his body, although his family had last seen him in April 1974. His cause of death was initially determined to be accidental due to alcohol and Valium intoxication, but was later reclassified as a homicide. His body remained unidentified until November 2023. Investigators note the similarity of modus operandi in the murder and body disposal of both men to that of other victims Kraft is known to have killed.

One unknown entry upon the scorecard reads "Hari Kari." This entry may refer to the stabbing murder of 30-year-old David Michael Sandt, who was found sexually assaulted and stabbed to death close to a vacant house in Long Beach on January 13, 1975. The multiple stab wounds inflicted were to Sandt's stomach, and his body was found in a kneeling position with his arms extended in front of him in a position reminiscent of the Japanese ritual suicide practice known as Hara-kiri.

== Suspected accomplice ==
Both circumstantial and DNA evidence relating to some of Kraft's murders have caused many to strongly suspect that not all of the murders attributed to Kraft were committed by one person. The prosecution believed these inconsistencies could only be explained by the presence of an accomplice. It is contended that Kraft would have had difficulty moving around 200-pound (90 kg) corpses. Dumping them from moving vehicles alone would also be difficult to do unnoticed.

Abrasions and debris found at some of the crime scenes, where bodies had been discarded upon or alongside freeways, indicated that they had been discarded from vehicles traveling at more than fifty miles per hour, and for one individual to perform this act without compromising his driving would be very difficult. Moreover, footprints in the sand close to where the body of John Leras was found at Sunset Beach in 1975 unequivocally indicate two people had carried the youth's body to where it was discarded. In the case of Eric Church, semen samples found on his body were inconsistent with Kraft's blood type, and, while the photographs of the victims found in Kraft's car had to have been processed somewhere, no photo developer ever reported Kraft's morbid images to the police. Kraft himself had no darkroom expertise or darkroom equipment.

During Kraft's trial, members of the prosecution admitted privately that they did not charge him with several murders that they were certain he had committed because of facts relating to the cases, which indicated more than one perpetrator. Although DNA evidence found upon the body of Church was incompatible with Kraft, investigators had found photographs depicting Church in Kraft's car and his distinctive Norelco electric razor was also found in Kraft's house.

=== Jeffrey Graves ===
The prosecution believed Kraft's former lover, Jeffrey Graves, may have assisted Kraft in several murders. Graves, who had lived with Kraft between 1971 and 1976 (when sixteen known murders attributed to Kraft occurred), had been questioned concerning the Crotwell abduction and murder in 1975 when he verified part of Kraft's alibi to police. When questioned further about the incident following Kraft's arrest in 1983, Graves had informed investigators: "I'm really not going to pay for it, you know." Graves died of AIDS on July 27, 1987, at the age of 38. At the time of his death, police had been preparing to question him further.

=== Bob Jackson ===
In January 2000, journalist Dennis McDougal, the author of a 1991 book about Kraft entitled Angel of Darkness, published an article which recounted interviews with a small-time criminal named Bob Jackson, who reportedly confessed to murdering two hitchhikers with Kraft: one in Wyoming in 1975 and another in Colorado in 1976. Authorities in both Colorado and Wyoming were unable to corroborate these claims.

Jackson also claimed to McDougal that Kraft's scorecard included only his "more memorable" murders; in Jackson's opinion, Kraft's total body count stood closer to 100. McDougal reported these allegations to police and provided tape recordings of the interviews. Detectives interrogated Jackson and eventually persuaded him to enter a mental institution; no murder charges were filed against him due to an absence of direct incriminating evidence.

Kraft sued McDougal and the publisher of Angel of Darkness in 1993, seeking $62 million in damages. The suit contended that the book smeared his "good name", unjustly portrayed him as a "sick, twisted man", and destroyed his prospects for future employment by ruining his chances of overturning his conviction on appeal. The lawsuit was dismissed by the California Supreme Court in June 1994.

== Other "Freeway Killers" ==
Patrick Kearney, a suspect in a series of killings of young men known as the "Trash Bag Murders", voluntarily surrendered to the Riverside Police Department in July 1977. He subsequently confessed to the murders of twenty-eight boys and young men, many of whom he had also discarded along freeways in Southern California. Although Kraft is also known to have dismembered some of his victims, Kearney invariably killed his victims by shooting them in the temple. In addition, Kearney discarded the majority of his victims' bodies in trash bags. Although primarily known as the Trash Bag Murderer, Kearney is also known as the Freeway Killer.

In 1980, William Bonin and four known accomplices were arrested for a series of killings known as the "Freeway Murders," which displayed a markedly similar disposal method to those committed by Kraft. Bonin is also known to have tortured his victims, although he never plied his victims with alcohol or drugs. In addition, although he is known to have stabbed some victims' genitalia with a knife and one victim to death, Bonin never mutilated their bodies, and almost all of his victims were strangled to death with their own T-shirts. Moreover, the majority of Bonin's victims were younger than those of Kraft, with the age range of his victims being 12 to 19 years.

== See also ==
- Capital punishment in California
- List of death row inmates in the United States § California
- List of serial killers by number of victims
- List of serial killers in the United States

== Sources ==
- Black, J. Anderson (1995). "Randy Kraft: Fiend of the Freeway". Real-Life Crimes (117). London, England: Eaglemoss Publications Ltd.: 2561–2572. ISBN 978-1-856-29970-1.
- Hicks, Jerry (December 6, 1987), "Evidence in Other Deaths Sought for Kraft Trial", Los Angeles Times (Orange County ed.), Los Angeles, CA, US, p. 1.
- ——— (March 7, 1988a), "Kraft Case Puts Both Sides in Odd Territory", Los Angeles Times.
- ——— (September 27, 1988b), "Alleged 'Death List' Made Public as Kraft Trial Opens", Los Angeles Times.
- ——— (October 2, 1988c), "Randy Kraft's Scorecard?", Los Angeles Times.
- ——— (October 9, 1988d), "Fate of Alleged Kraft Victim Torments Kin", Los Angeles Times.
- Jessel, David; Wilson, Colin, eds. (1992). "Murder Casebook, Investigations into the Ultimate Crime – The Freeway Killer". Murder Casebook (130). London: Marshall Cavendish. ISBN 978-0-748-53874-4.
- McDougal, Dennis (1992) [1991], Angel of Darkness: The True Story of Randy Kraft and the Most Heinous Murder Spree of the Century, Warner Books, ISBN 978-0-7088-5342-9.
- Newton, Michael (2011), Randy Kraft: Moving Violation, TruTV, archived from the original on September 14, 2008.
- Pinsky, Mark I (March 4, 1995), "22 Years Later, Another Kraft Victim Is Identified; Crime: Diligent Deputy Coroner Uses Computers to Figure Out it was Kevin Clark Bailey whose Body was Left by the Serial Killer in Huntington Beach", Los Angeles Times.
