= Dominique Sylvain =

French novelist (born 1957)

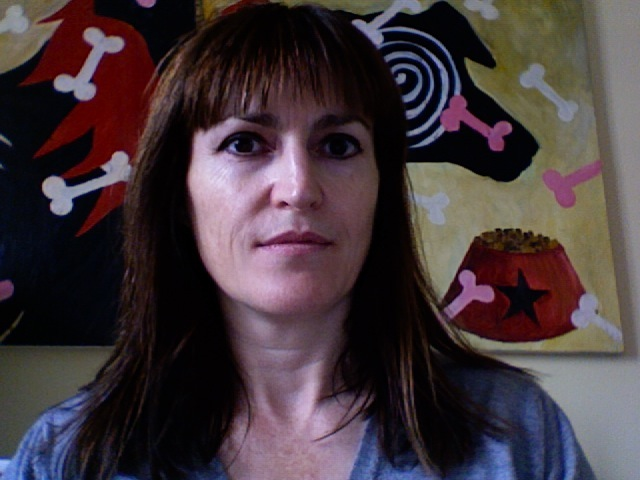
- Portrait of Domique Sylvain
- Born: September 30, 1957 (age 68); Thionville, Moselle, France
- Occupation: Author
- Writing career
- Genre: Crime Fiction
- Movement: Polar
- Website: www.dominiquesylvain.com

Dominique Sylvain (born 1957) is a French novelist specializing in crime fiction.

== Early life and education ==
Sylvain was born in Thionville. She was an independent journalist for Le Journal du dimanche, then worked as a corporate reporter in the steel industry for the Usinor group. She was also in charge of patronage at Usinor.

She received the following awards:

- Sang d'encre prize for Vox in 2000.
- Michel-Lebrun prize in 2001 for Strad
- Grand prix des lectrices de Elle in 2005 for Passage du Désir
- And the award for best French police novel 2011 by the LIRE magazine for Guerre sale.

== Career ==
Sylvain worked as an independent journalist for Le Journal du dimanche, then as a corporate journalist managing sponsorships in the steel industry at the Usinor group.

Sylvain began writing in 1993 during her first stay in Japan. The city of Tokyo provided the setting for her first novel Baka ! ("idiot" in Japanese).

Her early works feature the private investigator Louise Morvan and, beginning with the second novel in the series, her partner, commissioner Serge Clémenti. Following this, Vox, in 2000, and Cobra introduce a trio of officers of the Brigade criminelle (French criminal investigators) led by the commander Alexandre Bruce. Vox features a serial killer who dreams of downloading his mind into a machine. She was awarded the Sang d'Encre prize in 2000 for the novel Vox, and the Michel Lebrun prize en 2001 for Strad, which involves performers who use their body as a means of expression.

In 2004, she started the Ingrid et Lola series centering on the unofficial investigations of the American masseuse Ingrid Diesel and the retired commissioner Lola Jost. These stories include a mix of traditional crime fiction and humor. She was presented with the Elle magazine Grand Prix des Lectrices in 2005 for Passage du Désir (translated into English as Dark Angel

In 2007, the Sylvain rewrote her first book, Baka !, further developing the character of Louise Morvan. The detective later played a major role in Sylvain's La Nuit de Geronimo, a novel which intertwines dark family secrets, unethical research in molecular biology and GMOs. Her novel Sœurs de Sang centers around "victim art".

In the short story compilation Régals du Japon et d'ailleurs, Sylvain temporarily moved away from crime fiction, reminiscing on the gastronomic experiences of her youth and her travels.

In 2011 Sylvain contributed a story about Japanese passion for football to the Contrebandiers firm's collection Les Hommes en noir. Also that year her story Guerre sale was selected by the staff of LIRE magazine as the best French crime novel of 2011.

In 2012, she published the novel Le Roi Lézard, a rewrite of Travestis (1998) which features Jim Morrison, the lead singer of The Doors. In 2013, Sylvain contributed to the short story collection Femmes en colère along with Didier Daeninckx, Marc Villard and Marcus Malte. Also in 2013, she released Ombres et soleil, a direct sequel of Guerre sale.

Sylvain's novels have all been published by Éditions Viviane Hamy, in the Chemins Nocturnes collection. Her stories have been translated in almost a dozen languages, including Russian and Japanese.

== Bibliography ==
- Sylvain, Dominique (1997). Soeurs de sang. Paris: V. Hamy. ISBN 978-2-87858-085-3.
- Sylvain, Dominique (1998). Travestis : [policier. Paris, France: V. Hamy. ISBN 978-2-87858-095-2.
- Sylvain, Dominique (1999). Techno bobo. Paris: V. Hamy. ISBN 978-2-87858-108-9.
- Sylvain, Dominique (2000). Vox. Paris: Hamy. ISBN 978-2-87858-123-2.
- Sylvain, Dominique (2001). Strad. Paris: V. Hamy. ISBN 978-2-87858-132-4.
- Sylvain, Dominique (2002). Cobra. Paris: Hamy. ISBN 978-2-87858-157-7.
- Sylvain, Dominique (2004). Passage du désir. Paris: Hamy. ISBN 978-2-87858-188-1.
- Sylvain, Dominique (2007). Baka. Paris: Hamy. ISBN 978-287858-243-7.
- Sylvain, Dominique (2009). La nuit de Géronimo. Paris: V. Hamy. ISBN 978-2-87858-291-8.
- Sylvain, Dominique (2011). Guerre sale. Paris: V. Hamy. ISBN 978-2-87858-340-3.
- Sylvain, Dominique (2012). Le roi lézard. Paris: V. Hamy. ISBN 978-2-87858-511-7.
