= Evil Angel =

Evil Angel(s) may refer to:

- Fallen angel, a term mainly used in Christianity for angels that have been banished from heaven
- Evil Angel (studio), a production company for pornographic films owned by John Stagliano
- Evil Angels (film), a 1988 film originally released in Australia, known as A Cry in the Dark outside of Australia and New Zealand
- Evil Angels (novel), a 1981 novel by Pascal Bruckner
- Evil Angels, a 1985 book by John Bryson
- Evil Angel (film), a 2009 horror film
- "Evil Angel", a song by Rufus Wainwright from his 2001 album Poses
- "Evil Angel", a song by Breaking Benjamin from their 2006 album Phobia

== See also ==
- Angel of Evil (Italian: Vallanzasca – Gli angeli del male), 2010 Italian crime film
- Fallen angel (disambiguation)
- Dark Angel (disambiguation)
- Angel of Darkness (disambiguation)
- Angel (disambiguation)
- Evil (disambiguation)
