= Trapos (Attaque 77 album) =

Live album by Attaque 77
- Released: 2001
- Recorded: April 2001
- Venue: Estadio Obras Sanitarias
- Genre: Punk rock
- Label: Sony Music

Attaque 77 chronology
Radio Insomnio (2000)	Trapos (2001)	Caña! (2001)

Trapos ("Rags") is the second Attaque 77 live album.

== Overview ==
This is the second live album from Attaque 77, released and recorded in 2001 at the Estadio Obras Sanitarias in Buenos Aires.

== Track listing ==
1. "Perfección" [Perfection]
2. "Cambios" [Changes]
3. "Cuanta Cerveza" [A lot of beer]
4. "El Perro" [The dog]
5. "El Jorobadito" [The little hunchback]
6. "Nuestros años felices" [Our happy years]
7. "El cielo puede esperar" [Heaven can wait]
8. "Soy rebelde" [I'm a rebel]
9. "Chicos y Perros" [Kids and dogs]
10. "Cinco estrellas" [Five stars]
11. "Gil" [Jerk]
12. "Alza tu voz" [Raise your voice]
13. "Ángeles caídos" [Fallen angels]
14. "Soy de Attaque" [I'm from Attaque]
15. "Canción inútil" [Useless song]
16. "Consejos del abuelo" [Grandpa's advice]
17. "Tres pájaros negros" [Three black birds]
18. "Espadas y Serpientes" [Swords and snakes]
19. "Vacaciones permanentes" [Permanent vacation]
20. "Dame el fuego de tu amor" [Give me the fire of your love]
21. "Hacelo por mi" [Do it for me]
22. "No me arrepiento de este amor" [I don't regret this love]
23. "Numancia"

== Credits ==
- Ciro Pertusi - Lead vocals, rhythm guitar.
- Mariano Martínez - Lead guitar, vocals.
- Luciano Scaglione - Bass, backing vocals.
- Leonardo De Cecco - Drums.
