= Attaque 77 =

Argentine punk rock band

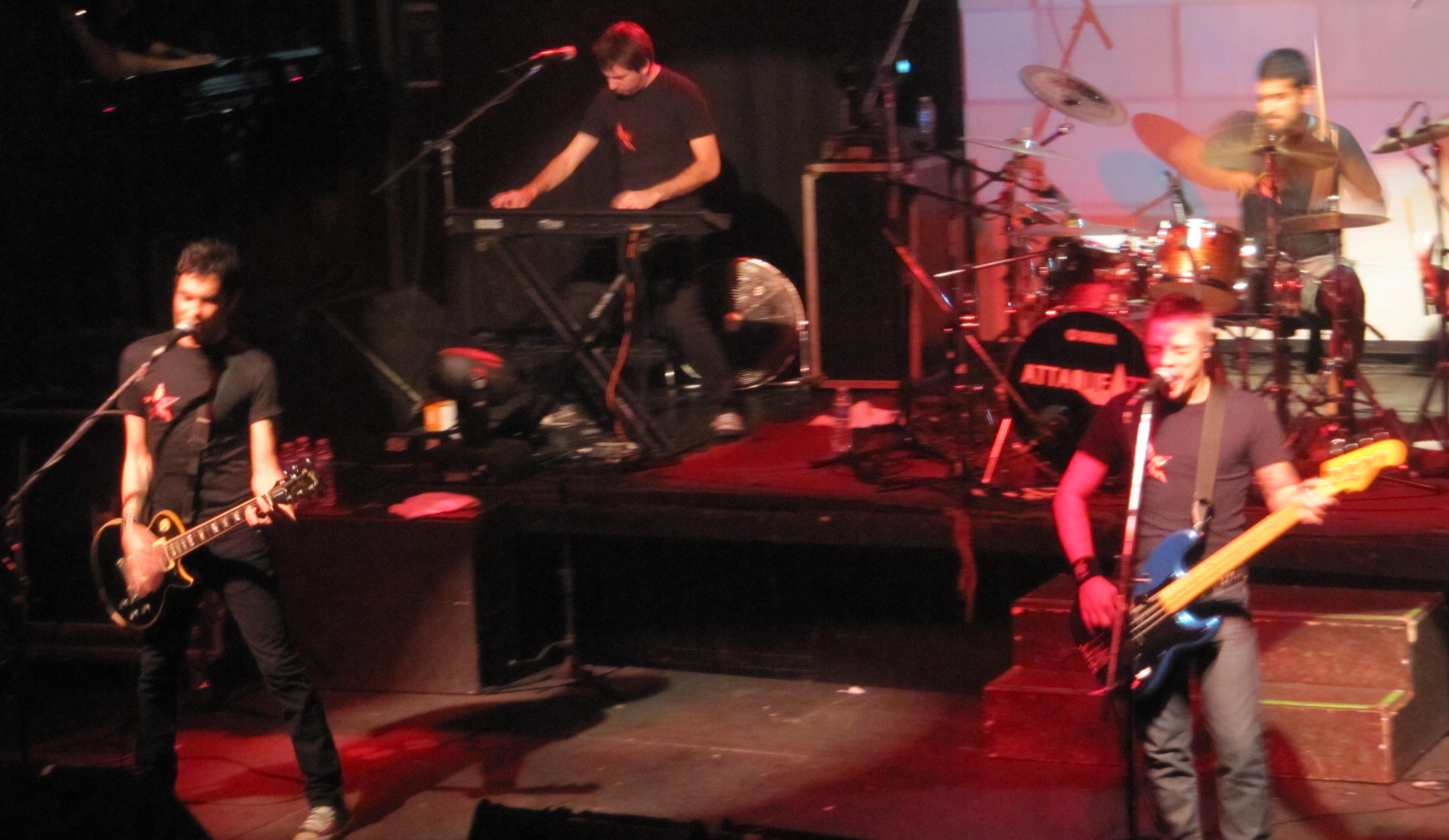
- Attaque 77 in Buenos Aires (2010)

Background information
- Origin: Buenos Aires, Argentina
- Genres: Punk rock Alternative rock Melodic hardcore Pop punk
- Years active: 1987–present
- Labels: Radio Tripoli Discos; RCA; Sony Music BMG
- Members: Mariano Martínez; Luciano Scaglione; Leonardo De Cecco
- Past members: Ciro Pertusi; Adrian Vera; Federico Pertusi; Daniel Caffieri; Claudio Leiva; Martín "Tucan" Bosa
- Website: www.attaque77oficial.com

Attaque 77 ("Attack 77"), sometimes stylized as A77aque, is an Argentine punk rock group. The band was formed in 1987 as a group of friends who got together to play their favorite songs, most of them by The Ramones, their favorite band and the one that influenced them the most. They started writing songs in the same punk rock style, with lyrics with proletarian content (about exploited factory workers, etc.), and wore denim jackets, which became one of their hallmarks in their beginnings. Currently, only three members continue performing and recording.

== History ==
=== 1987–1992: Early career and first commercial success ===
When they were just starting, they played the more traditional punk rock style of seminal bands like the aforementioned Ramones, the Sex Pistols or the early The Clash. In those years, the band became more popular by virtue of a more melodic style. High points in the band's history include the album El Cielo Puede Esperar in 1990, with the first band's big-hit "Hacelo Por Mí" and performing their first gigs at the Estadio Obras in October 1991.

In 1992, Attaque 77 released their third studio album Ángeles caidos, which first made their name widely recognizable, and the last with Adrián Vera, replaced by Luciano Scaglione.

=== 1993–1999: Breakthrough and change in musical style ===
In 1993, with their new label RCA, Attaque released Todo Está al Revés to some success in Argentina, touring the country in support of the album. Other high points include the high-selling album Amén! in 1995 and performing a new gig at the Estadio Obras in 1996.

An alternative rock/punk album Un Día Perfecto (U.D.P.), was released in 1997 and peaked on FM radio charts with the songs "Cambios", "Crecer" and "Angel". To commemorate their 12th anniversary the band released Otras Canciones, a covers album with the Attaque 77 members' favorite songs, signed with Ariola Records.

=== 2000–2008: Radio Insomnio, Antihumano and more success ===
In 2000, Attaque 77 traveled to Spain and recorded Radio Insomnio, later touring Europe. The 2003 album Antihumano marked the band's biggest mainstream success in Argentina and other countries, led to the alternative rock hit "Arrancacorazones" and melodic hardcore "Ojos de perro" and "Los Buenos Deseos". Almost three years later, the band edited Karmagedon, in 2007, the last album with Ciro Pertusi.

=== 2009–2011: Pertusi's departure and Estallar ===
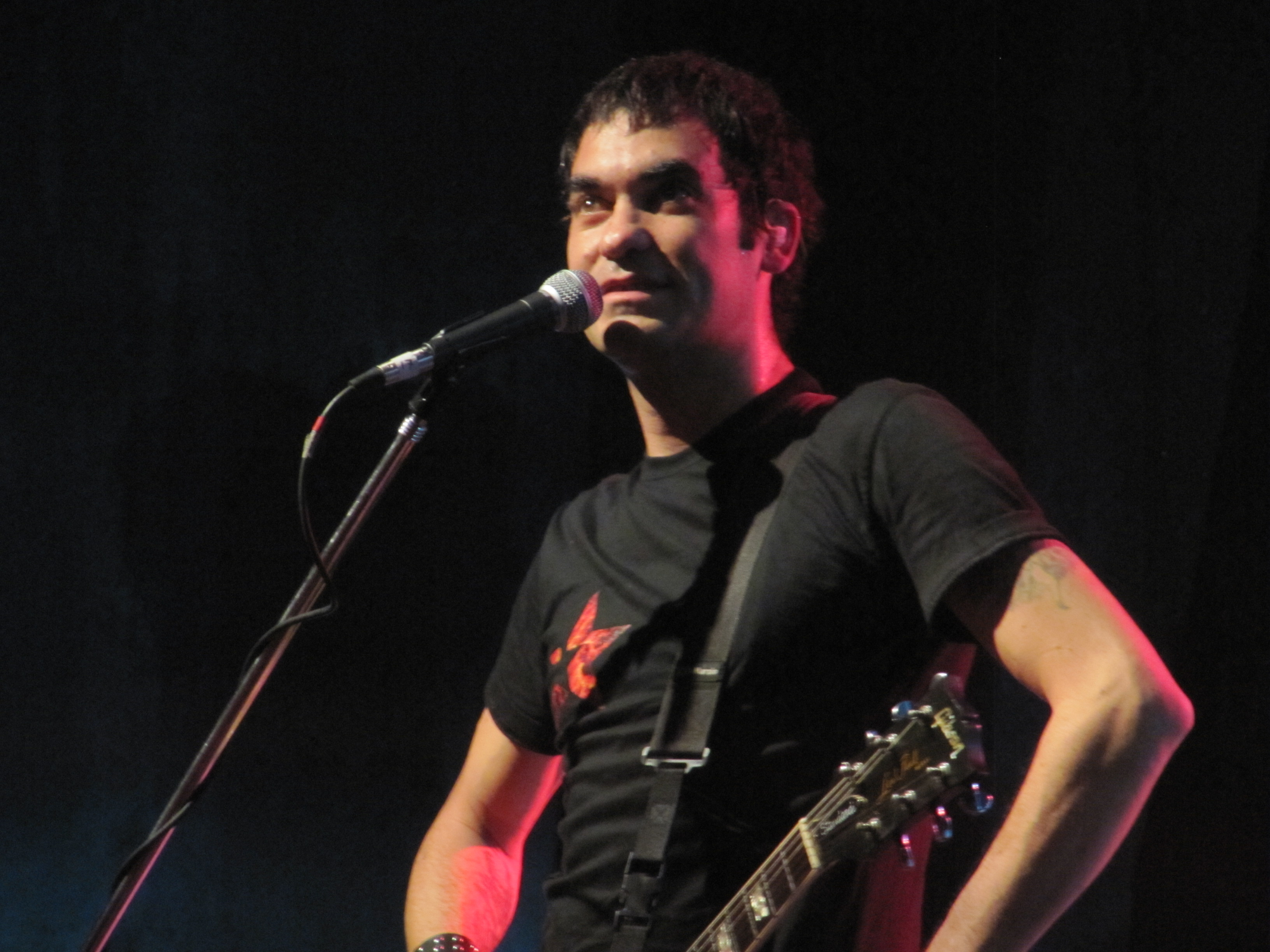
Mariano Martínez, the leader of Attaque 77 since 2009.

In early 2009, Ciro Pertusi left the group for personal reasons, leaving only Martinez, De Cecco and Scaglione as current members. Pertusi recently formed a new group called "Jauría" in 2010, with Esteban '22' Serniotti on guitar and vocals, Mauro Ambesi on bass and Ray Fajardo (ex-El Otro Yo) on drums.

In 2009 came the album Estallar devised largely by Mariano Martinez, with relative commercial success. That same year, Attaque 77 performed a gig at the Luna Park Stadium with Adrián Vera as guest.

=== 2012–present: Acoustic tour and new album ===
In 2012, the band release the first acoustic live album Acustico Teatro Opera Bs As, with special guests. In 2014, the present day line-up released a new album Nuevas Versiones, with some reworking songs of the band.

In March 2015, a documentary movie about the band "Mas de un Millon" was selected to be premiered mid-April at the Buenos Aires International Festival of Independent Cinema.

== Attaque 77 background ==
Mariano Martínez and Ciro Pertusi are vegetarians and so they have composed many songs promoting animal rights, including Espiral de Silencio (Spiral of Silence), San Fermín and Ojos de Perro (Dog’s Eyes).

According to polls by their fan club Regimiento de Pecadores (Sinners Regiment), their most famous song is "Hacelo por Mí" (Do it for me) and their best lyrics are in the song Donde las águilas se Atreven (Where the eagles dare) from which the fan club gets its name.

== Members ==
Current members

- Mariano Martínez - lead vocals (since 2009), guitars, keyboards (since 1987–present).
- Luciano Scaglione − bass, double bass, backing vocals (since 1993–present).
- Leonardo De Cecco - drums, percussion and acoustic guitar (1989–present).

Additional musicians

- Andrea Álvarez - percussion (2003–present).
- Lucas Ninci - keyboards, bandoneón and backing vocals (2009–present)

Former members

- Ciro Pertusi - lead vocals (1989-2009), rhythm guitar (1995-2009), bass (1987-1989)
- Adrián Vera - bass (1989-1992)
- Federico Pertusi - lead vocals (1987-1989)
- Daniel Caffieri - rhythm guitar (1987-1988)
- Claudio Leiva - drums, percussion (1987-1989)
- Martín "Tucan" Bosa - keyboards, backing vocals (1998-2009)

== Discography ==
Studio albums

- Dulce Navidad (1989, Radio Tripoli Records)
- El Cielo Puede Esperar (1990, Radio Tripoli Records)
- Angeles Caídos (1992, Radio Tripoli Records/Sony Music)
- Todo Está al Revés (1993, RCA Records/Sony Music)
- Amén! (1995, RCA Records/Sony Music)
- Un Día Perfecto (U.D.P.) (1997, RCA Records/Sony Music)
- Otras Canciones (1998, Ariola Records/Sony Music)
- Radio Insomnio (2000, Ariola Records/Sony Music)
- Amateur (2002, BMG)
- Antihumano (2003, BMG)
- Karmagedon (2007, BMG)
- Estallar (2009, Sony Music)
- Nuevas Versiones (2014, Sony Music)
- Triángulo de Fuerza (2019)

EPs

- Pirotecnia autorizada (2006, BMG)

Live albums

- Rabioso! La Pesadilla Recién Comienza (1991, Radio Tripoli Records)
- 89 - 92 (1994, Radio Tripoli Records)
- Trapos (2001, BMG)
- Karmagedon en vivo (2008, BMG)
- Acustico Teatro Opera Bs As (2012)

Compilation albums

- Caña! (2001, Ariola Records/Sony Music)
- Obras cumbres (2005, BMG)

== See also ==
- Argentine punk
- Punk rock
