= Angel of Darkness (book) =

1991 book by Dennis McDougal

- Author: Dennis McDougal
- Language: English
- Genre: Non-fiction, crime
- Publisher: Hachette Book Group USA
- Publication date: May 1, 1991
- Publication place: United States
- Media type: Hardcover, paperback
- Pages: 336 pgs
- ISBN: 0446515388

Angel of Darkness: The True Story of Randy Kraft and the Most Heinous Murder Spree of the Century is a non-fiction book by investigative journalist and American author Dennis McDougal published in 1991 by the Hachette Book Group. McDougal was an investigative reporter for the Long Beach Press-Telegram assigned to cover the case when Kraft was arrested. At the time Angel of Darkness was released, McDougal was working as a reporter for the Los Angeles Times.

== Story line ==
The book is a true account about Randy Steven Kraft, a convicted serial murderer known as the "Freeway Killer" who was responsible for the mutilation murders of 16 young men. Prosecutors have said they believe Kraft to be responsible for the death of a total of 67 men between the years 1971 and 1983.

The book includes mini-biographies of many of Kraft's victims. The victims—many of them members of the U.S. Marines Corps, most of them hitchhikers—were believed to have been drugged by Kraft, who then tortured and strangled them. The victims' bodies, many of which were sexually mutilated, usually were dumped along freeway ramps or in remote areas.

== Slander lawsuit ==
Kraft sued author McDougal and his publisher seeking $62 million in damages, because, Kraft said, the book smeared his "good name" and unjustly portrayed him as a "sick, twisted man" and hurt his "prospects for future employment." The lawsuit was dismissed as frivolous in June 1994. The suit cost McDougal about $50,000 in legal fees to defend the book.

== Publication and reception ==
Angel of Darkness was released in hardcover on May 1, 1991, and published in paperback on June 27, 2009. Upon its initial release, Publisher Weekly's review was positive. They wrote, "Los Angeles Times reporter McDouglas here draws a multidimensional portrait of a psycho- and sociopath, not sparing the reader details of the incredible cruelty that Kraft inflicted on his victims, of the scorecard he kept to record his 'successes' and of the impaired lives of the families whose sons, brothers and husbands he slaughtered."

Kirkus Reviews noted that the book was written in "matter-of-fact prose."

The review in Library Journal said McDougal "lets the killer speak for himself, and Kraft does so with chilling normalcy. This book will make readers look at their acquaintances and wonder if ... ?" The Associated Press wrote, "To open this book is to open a peephole into hell."
