= Dark Angel (Shadowrun) =

Dark Angel is a 1993 role-playing adventure for Shadowrun published by FASA.

== Plot summary ==
Dark Angel is an adventure in which the player characters investigate what happened when an elven rock musician set himself on fire.

== Reception ==
Angel Leigh McCoy reviewed Dark Angel in White Wolf #38 (1993), rating it a 3 out of 5 and stated that "a more detailed index would have been very useful for referencing some of the more obscure information that players invariably request. Overall, this module demands a lot from the referee and yet, it holds the potential for a tense and exciting adventure."

== Reviews ==
- Roleplayer Independent (Volume 1, Issue 7 - Jun 1993)
