= Mary Murphy (news personality) =

American journalist and author

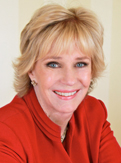
Mary Murphy

Mary Murphy is an American television personality, print journalist and author. She was an on-air correspondent for The Insider and a news producer at Entertainment Tonight. Murphy is also a senior lecturer at USC Annenberg School for Communication and Journalism. She has been a contributor to the Los Angeles Times Magazine, USA Weekend Magazine, the New York Post and The Hollywood Reporter. Murphy has been on the staff of the Los Angeles Times and New York, Esquire, and TV Guide Magazines.

== Career ==
Murphy is originally from St. Louis, Missouri, and began her career as a journalist at the St. Louis Post-Dispatch. From there she moved to the Los Angeles Times, where she worked for eight years. She was hired away from the Los Angeles Times to become a correspondent for New York/New West Magazine. In the 1980s she became the West Coast Roving Editor for Esquire magazine. She also wrote extensively for TV Guide magazine.

In 2007, she worked as the entertainment editor for MyTime.com, responsible for shooting video and writing a daily blog about the entertainment industry.

In 2008 and 2009, Murphy worked as an international correspondent for Reader's Digest Magazine 's "Purpose Driven Life."

Today, Murphy continues to contribute to USA Weekend Magazine, the New York Post and The Hollywood Reporter. She has written Hollywood and human-interest stories for the Los Angeles Times Magazine, including a piece on LA Matchmakers and actor Tom Selleck and a story on Katie Couric in the New York Post 9/2/12 on the launch of her new show.

== The Insider ==
She was the "Back Story" correspondent for The Insider, a nationally syndicated entertainment show on the CBS network. Her segment about the in-depth past of Hollywood stars, shows and movies ran daily.

== Book ==
Murphy is also the co-author of the book Blood Cold, an investigation of the Robert Blake murder scandal.
