= List of Miami Dade College alumni =

This list of Miami Dade College alumni includes graduates, non-graduate former students and current students of Miami Dade College.

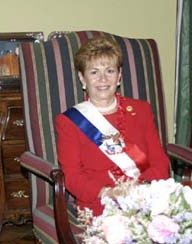
Mireya Moscoso

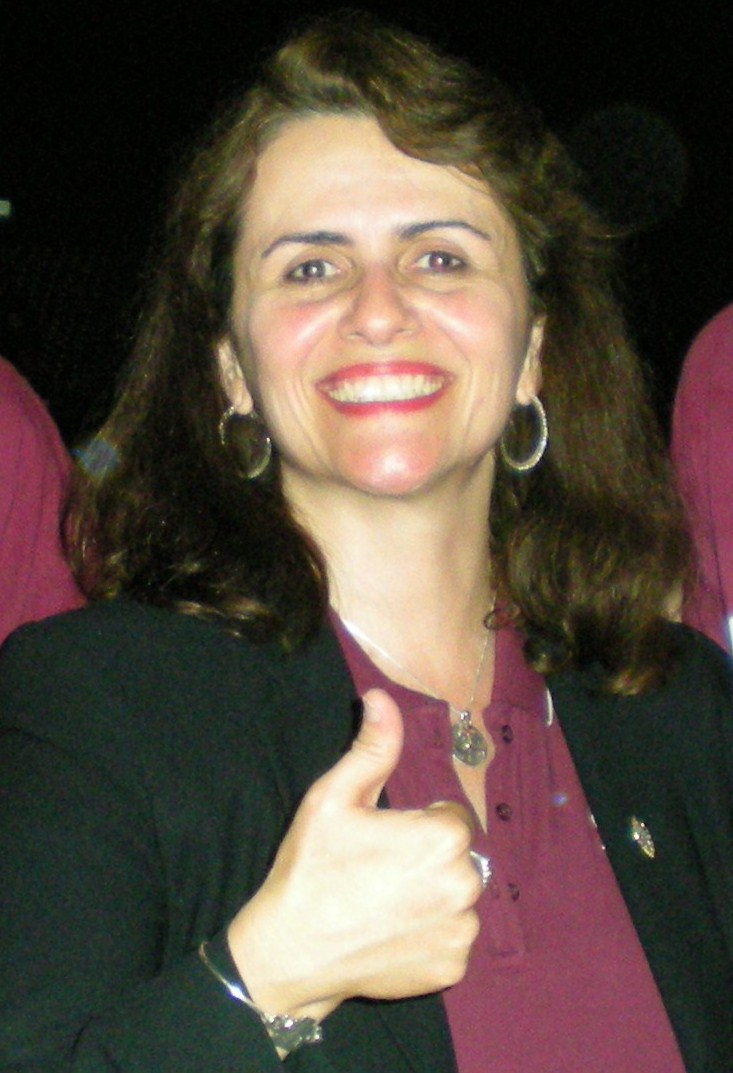
Elsa Murano

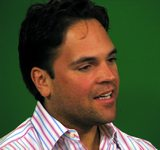
Mike Piazza

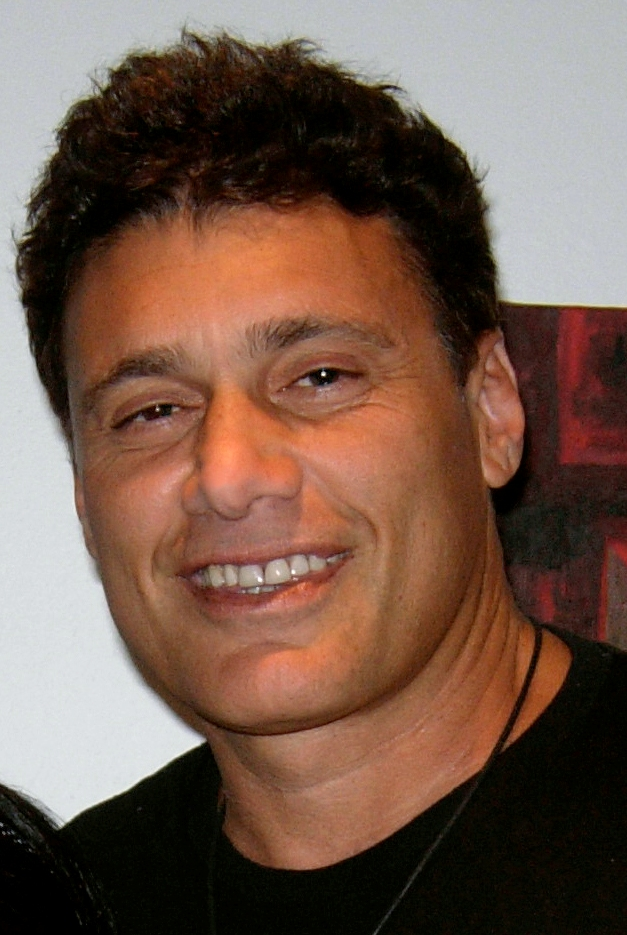
Steven Bauer

Manny Diaz

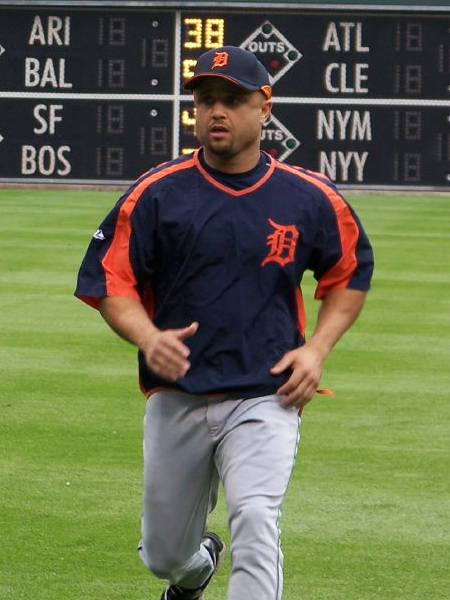
Plácido Polanco

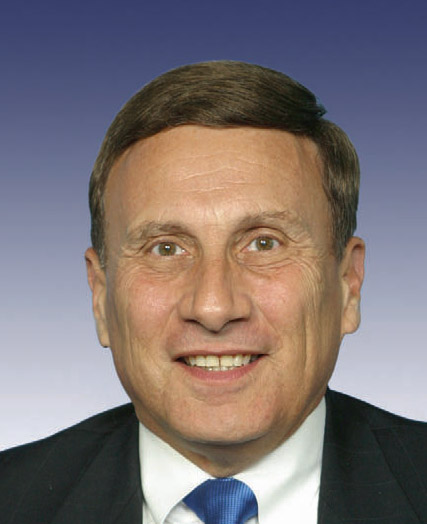
John Mica

== Arts and entertainment ==
=== Film, television and theater ===
Alumni	Notability
Steven Bauer	Actor who played Manny Ribera in the 1983 film Scarface
Jencarlos Canela	Actor and singer, starring in Telemundo telenovela Más Sabe el Diablo
Nilo Cruz	Cuban-American playwright and pedagogue; with his award of the 2003 Pulitzer Prize for Drama for his play, Anna in the Tropics, he became the first Latino honored
Katie Finneran	Broadway actress noted for her award-winning performances in Noises Off in 2002, and Promises, Promises in 2010
Raymond Forchion	Actor, writer, producer, director; co-starred in the 2008 Emmy-winning HBO movie Recount
Lissette Garcia	Miss Florida USA 2011 (and made the top 16 in Miss USA 2011), represented Cuba in Reina Hispanoamericana 2007 and made the top 8
Hannia Guillen	Actress and singer; known for her portrayal of Paloma Lopez-Fitzgerald on the NBC daytime television soap opera Passions
Glenn Howerton	Actor and comedian; co-creator and star of It's Always Sunny in Philadelphia
Oscar Isaac	Guatemalan-American actor who played Poe Dameron in the Star Wars franchise
Kiel Martin	Actor; played J. D. LaRue on Hill Street Blues
Yara Martinez	Television actress, My Own Worst Enemy
Rajee Narinesingh	Transgender actress, activist, author, singer, and reality television personality, most known for her appearances on the E! Entertainment docu-series, Botched
Ana María Polo	Attorney and TV judge on Caso Cerrado
Sylvester Stallone	Actor; played Rocky Balboa in Rocky and John Rambo in Rambo
Bob Vila	Host of home improvement show This Old House

=== Art and literature ===
Alumni	Notability
Lin Arison	American Novelist and arts patron
Liz Balmaseda	Cuban-American Pulitzer Prize-winning journalist and author
James Carlos Blake	Mexican-American Award-winning novelist
Agnes Chavez	Cuban-American artist
Demi	Cuban-born American painter
Jane Hart	American curator and gallerist
Mirta Ojito	Cuban-American 2000 Pulitzer Prize-winning author
Elena Presser	Argentine artist
Arturo Rodríguez	Cuban-born American painter
Cesar Santos	Cuban-born American artist and portrait painter

=== Music ===
Alumni	Notability
Elizabeth Caballero	Opera singer
Harry Wayne "KC" Casey	Singer/songwriter, KC & The Sunshine Band
Desmond Child	Grammy Award-winning songwriter/producer
Willy Chirino	Grammy Award-winning singer
Emilio Estefan	Musician and producer; former member of the Miami Sound Machine, and husband of singer Gloria Estefan
Alex Lacamoire	Tony Award-winning orchestrator and music director
Jo Mersa Marley	Jamaican reggae musician
Alberto Zamarbide	Heavy metal musician

== Athletics ==
Alumni	Notability
Jonathan Albaladejo	Currently plays for the Yomiuri Giants in Nippon Professional Baseball; former pitcher for the Washington Nationals and New York Yankees
Joe Arnold	Former head baseball coach for Florida Southern College, the University of Florida, and Polk State College; former manager of the Staten Island Yankees
Pete Athas	Former NFL defensive back, played for the New York Giants
Don Baylor	Former hitting coach for the Colorado Rockies; former manager for the Chicago Cubs
Derek Botelho	Former baseball pitcher for the Kansas City Royals and Chicago Cubs
Bill Britton	Pro golfer, PGA Tour
Warren Cromartie	Former baseball player, most recently for the Kansas City Royals
Reggie Cross	Former basketball player
Russell Earl "Bucky" Dent	Former baseball player and manager; earned two World Series rings as the starting shortstop for the New York Yankees in 1977 and 1978; voted the World Series MVP in 1978
Orestes Destrade	Former baseball player, most recently for the Florida Marlins
Tal Erel	Israel National Baseball Team player
Alex Fernandez	Former baseball pitcher, most recently for the Florida Marlins
Bruce Fleisher	Senior PGA Tour player
Margie Goldstein-Engle	Equestrian
Raúl Ibañez	Major League Baseball player for the New York Yankees
Ernie Jones	Former NFL defensive back, played for the Seattle Seahawks
Maurice Kemp	Basketball player in the Israeli Basketball Premier League
Willie Lozado	Former baseball infielder for the Milwaukee Brewers
Nathaniel Moore	Former Miami Dolphins wide receiver; current Miami Dolphins vice president/special advisor
Xavier Munford	Basketball player for Hapoel Tel Aviv of the Israeli Basketball Premier League
Jaime Navarro	Former baseball player, most recently for the Cleveland Indians
Omar Olivares	Former baseball player, most recently for the Pittsburgh Pirates
Orlando Palmeiro	Former baseball player, most recently for the Houston Astros
Mike Piazza	Hall of Fame baseball player notable for his time with the New York Mets
Plácido Polanco	Major League Baseball player for the Philadelphia Phillies
Mickey Rivers	Former baseball player, most recently for the Texas Rangers
Alex Sanchez	Former baseball player, most recently for the San Francisco Giants
Andrés Torres	Major League Baseball player for the San Francisco Giants

== Banking and finance ==
Alumni	Notability
Octavio Hernández	President and CEO of U.S. Century Bank
David Komansky	Former CEO of Merrill Lynch

== Business ==
Alumni	Notability
Micky Arison	CEO of Carnival Corporation and owner of the Miami Heat
Ralph de la Vega	President and CEO of AT&T Mobility
Manuel D. Medina	Chairman and CEO of Terremark Worldwide, Inc.
Jorge M. Pérez	Chairman and CEO of The Related Companies of Florida
Maria Sastre	Airline executive, on the General Mills board of directors

== Education ==
Alumni	Notability
Lawrence G. Abele	Provost and executive vice president at Florida State University
Elsa Murano	Former president of Texas A&M University

== Journalism, broadcast and print ==
Alumni	Notability
Johnny Diaz	Writer for the Boston Globe
Chris Myers	Emmy Award-winning sports-broadcasting host on the Tennis Channel
Belkys Nerey	Anchor WSVN-TV
Eliott Rodriguez	Anchor WFOR-TV
Maria Elvira Salazar	Former CNN en Español journalist, Emmy Award-winning, Hispanic TV journalist

== Law ==
Alumni	Notability
Jose Baez	Criminal defense lawyer
Alberto Cardenas	Senior partner at Tew Cardenas, LLP

== Nonprofit organizations ==
Alumni	Notability
Larry King, Jr.	President, Larry King Cardiac Foundation

== Politics ==
Alumni	Notability
Carlos Alvarez	Former Miami-Dade mayor
Frank Artiles	Florida representative
Carol M. Browner	Former assistant to the president for Energy and Climate Change in the Obama Administration
Paul L. Cejas	Former U.S. ambassador to Belgium
Manny Diaz	Former City of Miami mayor
Katherine Fernandez Rundle	State attorney, Miami-Dade County
Luis Garcia	Florida representative
Rene Garcia	Florida State Senator
Eduardo "Eddy" Gonzalez	Florida representative
Carol W. Hunstein	Chief justice of the U.S. State Supreme Court of Georgia
Carlos Lopez-Cantera	Florida representative
Gwen Margolis	Florida State senator
Michel Martelly	President of Haiti
John L. Mica	Current member of the U.S. House of Representatives
Mireya Moscoso	Former president of Panama
Lincoln Myers	Former Minister of Food Production, Marine Exploitation, Forestry and the Environment, Trinidad and Tobago
R. David Paulison	Former administrator of the Federal Emergency Management Agency and Department of Homeland Security
Juan-Carlos "J.C." Planas	Florida representative
Julio Robaina	Florida representative
Shahine Robinson	Member of the Parliament of Jamaica for North East Saint Ann
Ileana Ros-Lehtinen	Former member of the U.S. House of Representatives
Jeanette Dousdebes Rubio	wife of U.S. Senator and presidential candidate Marco Rubio
Geraldine F. Thompson	Florida representative
J. Alex Villalobos	Former Florida senator

== Aviation ==
Alumni	Notability
Linda Pauwels	First Latina captain and first Latina check airman at American Airlines
