= Homenaje =

Live album by V8
- Released: 1996
- Genre: Heavy metal
- Label: MCA

V8 chronology
No Se Rindan (1991)	Homenaje (1996)	Antologia (2002)

Homenaje (Spanish: Tribute) is a 1996 live album by the Argentine heavy metal band V8, recorded during the "Metal Rock Festival" at Obras Sanitarias. The concert was a reunion of the band's first line-up, with the exception of its original bass player Ricardo Iorio.

== Background ==
V8 was a 1980s Argentine heavy metal band whose most famous line-up included Ricardo Iorio (bass), Osvaldo Civile (guitar), Alberto Zamarbide (vocals) and Gustavo Rowek (drums), which recorded the band's first two studio albums. Civile and Rowek left in 1985, and the band broke up in 1987. All four members created new bands, all of which were among the most influential in Argentine heavy metal. Civile created Horcas, and Rowek joined Walter Giardino (another former V8 member) in Rata Blanca. Iorio created Hermética, and then Almafuerte when Hermética broke up in 1995. Zamarbide and the remaining members of the last line-up of V8 (including guitarist Miguel Roldán) formed the band Logos.

== Reunion of V8 ==
Logos played a concert in Cemento in 1995, and Zamarbide invited Civile and Rowek to play four songs of V8 at the end, in an unannounced reunion. Since Iorio was absent, guitarist Roldán played bass. The reception was highly positive, and a second reunion was planned for the "Metal Rock Festival" at the Estadio Obras Sanitarias, to include the three bands Logos, Horcas and Rata Blanca. The V8 reunion, this time for a full concert, was unadvertised but spread as an open secret.

The concert was recorded for a release as a live album. Rowek explained that the studio albums made by V8 had a low sound quality, that the band never had a big last concert, and that many young fans had never seen the band live. The CD also includes a new song, "A través de los tiempos" (Spanish: Across the times), recorded in the studio. The lyrics talk about the legacy of V8. The album is labeled as a tribute album; Gustavo Rowek clarified that it is a tribute to the fans of 1980s Argentine heavy metal in general.

== Track listing ==
1. "Deseando Destruir y Matar"
2. "Cautivos Del Sistema"
3. "Muy Cansado Estoy"
4. "Momento De Luchar"
5. "Parcas Sangrientas"
6. "Si Puedes Vencer Al Temor"
7. "Ángeles De Las Tinieblas"
8. "Ideando La Fuga"
9. "Brigadas Metálicas"
10. "Destrucción"
11. "A Través De Los Tiempos"

== Personnel ==
- Miguel Roldan - Bass guitar, backing vocals
- Osvaldo Civile - Lead guitar
- Alberto Zamarbide - Lead vocals
- Gustavo Rowek - Drums
