= Walter Meza =

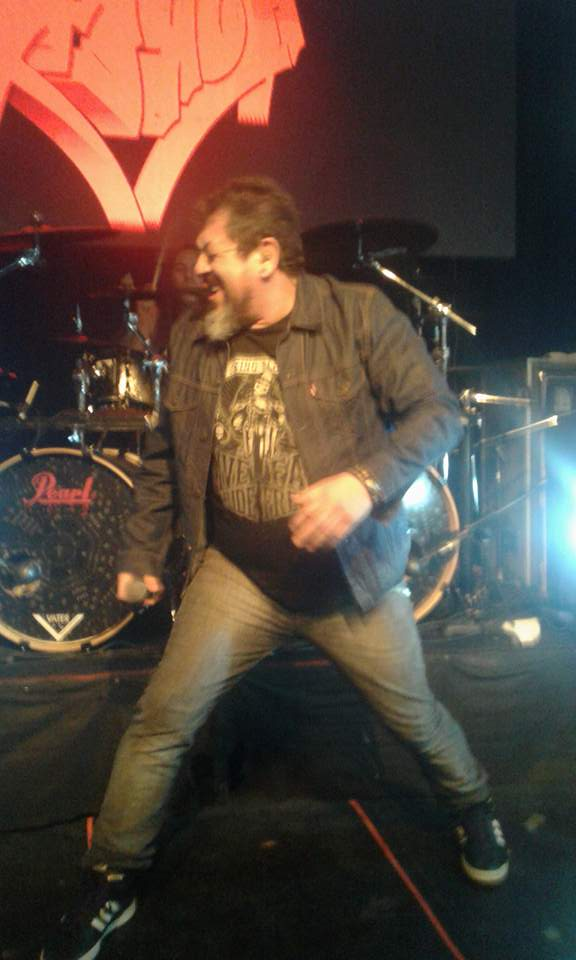

Background information
- Also known as: Tanque
- Born: Walter Darío Meza; December 8, 1966 (age 59); San Justo, Buenos Aires, Argentina
- Genres: Heavy metal Thrash metal
- Occupation: Singer
- Instrument: Voice
- Years active: 1980–present
- Labels: Sony BMG; NEMS Enterprises; Tocka Discos

Walter Meza (born December 8, 1966, Buenos Aires, Aregentina) is an Argentinian singer of thrash metal and heavy metal, known for being the singer of the band Horcas, from 1997 to the present.

== Biography ==
Walter Darío Meza was born in Buenos Aires City, moving on his first years to the town of San Justo in the city of La Matanza. He began his career in a group called Barloff. Later, when he was fourteen years old, he was the singer of the band Delay, band where also was Paul Mondello, current guitarist of the band Massacre. Also was part of the bands Samurai and Heinkel.

He later joined Jeriko, with some of the members of his former bands Heinkel and Retrosatan. With this lineup, they recorded a demo of four songs and reached the final of a contest sponsored by Yamaha, being able to play along other important groups like Hermética, Rata Blanca, Logos and Lethal.

Walter left the group in 1995 and in 1997 he became the singer of Horcas, the band of the former V8 guitarist, Osvaldo Civile, role he holds until today.

With this group, he edited more than ten studio albums and performed along international bands like Pantera, Slayer, Iron Maiden, Sepultura, Stratovarius, Soulfly, Exodus, Megadeth, Metallica and Black Sabbath.

== Discography ==
=== with Jeriko ===
- 1994 – Bajo mi Ley (demo)
- 2004 – Jerikó

=== with Horcas ===
- 1997 – Vence
- 1999 – Eternos
- 2002 – Horcas
- 2003 – Horcas vive
- 2004 – Demencial
- 2006 – Asesino
- 2008 – Reviviendo huestes
- 2010 – La maldición continúa
- 2013 – Por tu honor

== See also ==
- Argentine heavy metal
