= Alianza (Argentine band) =

Argentine hard rock band

- Origin: Argentina
- Genre: Hard rock
- Years active: 1994–2000
- Members: Adrián Barilari; Hugo Bistolfi

Alianza (Spanish: Alliance) was an Argentine hard rock band, with former members of Rata Blanca.

== History ==
Alianza was created by the singer Adrián Barilari and the keyboard player Hugo Bistolfi, along with session musicians. Barilari and Bistolfi left Rata Blanca, rejecting the style shift initiated in El Libro Oculto, with more aggressive heavy metal. Alianza was focused instead in ballads and hard rock.

Rata Blanca lost popularity without Barilari, and broke up. Barilari and Bistolfi were invited to a concert of Walter Giardino Temple, the new band of Rata Blanca's leader Walter Giardino. This concert led to a reunion of Rata Blanca, with Barilari and Bistolfi, and the subsequent breakup of Alianza.

== Members ==
=== Regular members ===
- Adrián Barilari - Singer
- Hugo Bistolfi - Keyboards, chorus

=== Session musicians ===
- Gonzalo Ledesma - Guitars
- Daniel Telis - Guitars
- Marcelo Pérez Schneider - Bass
- Guillermo Vadalá - Bass
- Javier Barilari - Chorus
- Fabián Bruno - Drums
- Jota Morelli - Drums

== Discography ==
- Sueños del Mundo (1994)
- Alianza (1997)
- Huellas (1999)
