= Alejandro Vigilante =

American painter

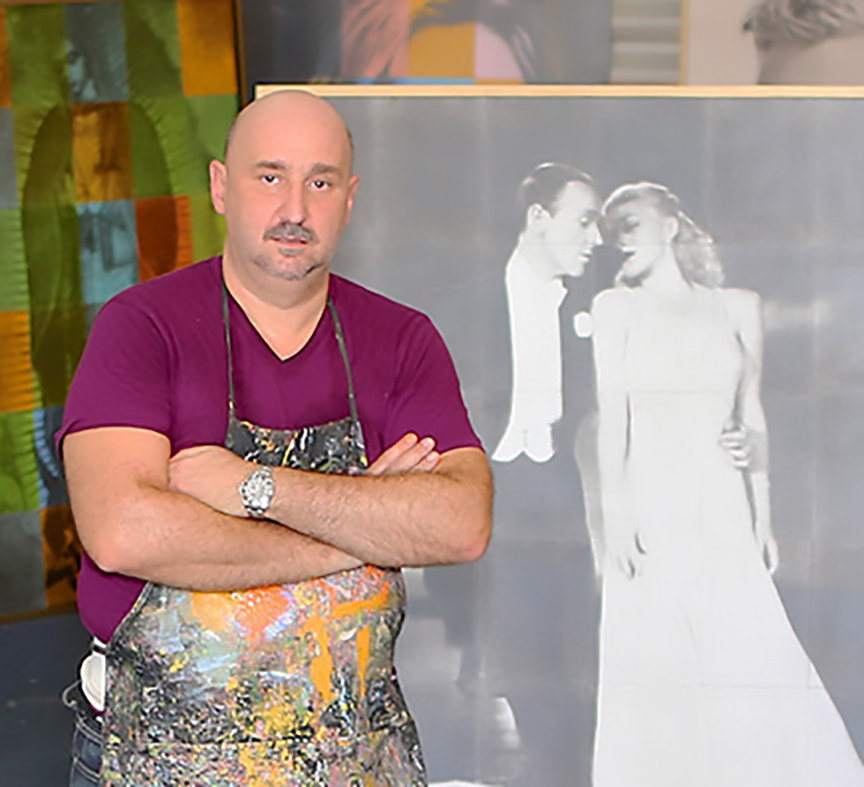
- Born: 1964 (age 61–62); Buenos Aires
- Died: October 15, 2024 (aged 59–60)
- Education: National School of Fine Arts Prilidiano Pueyrredon
- Notable work: E-mail is my art “Audrey Hepburn @ Tiffany’s”
- Style: Internet art
- Movement: iArt Movement
- Website: http://www.alejandrovigilante.com/

Alejandro Vigilante (born 1964, Buenos Aires) is an Argentinean-born painter, muralist and designer based in South Florida. He is considered the founder of the iArt Movement, which gathers the legacy of pop art, adding the language and symbolism of the Internet art, creating a new virtual and interactive world from his compositions. He has developed his work between Miami, New York and Buenos Aires. He died at age 59 on October 15, 2024 in Atlanta, GA.

== Professional development ==
He studied Fine Arts in Argentina at the National School of Fine Arts Prilidiano Pueyrredon. He was the son of architect and surrealist painter Juan Vigilante, who died when he was 4 years old and was his reference in the beginning. Trying to get away from the influence of his father's work he left Argentina in 1995 after receiving an invitation from the art show "Art Miami" to settle in South Florida. Shortly thereafter, he was commissioned by Patricia and Phillip Frost to paint a monumental Palladian-style Italian ceiling in their Star Island Villa in Miami Beach, which was an endorsement for him to be known in that society. He began his career as a fine art painter, and later on as muralist, using bright colors, and attracting much of Florida's jet set, and earned the nickname "the Michelangelo of Miami". Among his clients were not only the Frost couple, but also Emilio Stefan, for whom he decorated part of the Cardozo Hotel with murals inspired on Art Deco, and Cuban businessmen Armando Codina and Manny Medina, for whom he also painted murals in their residences. Oliver Stone commissioned a portrait of Al Pacino for his film "Any given Sunday". His mural art was displayed in such New York landmarks as Tiffanys' Jewelry Salon and the Marriott Hotel. He also painted the murals in various rooms of Jackson Memorial Hospital for the United Foundation for AIDS.

The fall of the Twin Towers in September 2001 found him working at the Marriott Hotel, a short distance from the attack. The need to communicate by email with his family to tell them he was safe -all phones were blocked- , was his best motivation to turn his art from the static murals to the ubiquitous internet-based design. So he started researching Warhol and Litchenstein's pop art, and ended by bringing Robert Rauschenberg's "transfer image technique" up to date. From pop art to the iArt Movement there was only one step, and Vigilante took it with excitement to start playing with the wide range of resources offered by the internet: emails, tweets, Facebook and Instagram posts or including the meta language of these apps. His new creations included a fictional/literary side by creating and adding to pop art the emails that would have been written by renowned figures of classic cinema. He was thus the founder of the iArt Movement that has social networks and the Internet as a platform for communication and interaction from digital to art, and continues to develop his concept.

He has exhibited in galleries in Buenos Aires, New York, Punta del Este, Miami, Barcelona, Los Angeles, Mexico and Amsterdam, among other cities.

Among the collectors who have Vigilante's work are Lady Gaga, Gloria and Emilio Stefan, Michael Jordan, Marcelo Tinelli, Kenneth Griffin, Jasminder Singh, David Grutman, Halle Berry, Olivier Martinez, Alex Rodriguez, Richart Ruddie and Michael Ballack.

== Main exhibitions ==
- Art Miami 2013, Miami FL featured by Galería Alfredo Ginocchio.
- Art Cartagena, Colombia 2013 featured by Galería Alfredo Ginocchio.
- Art Fair, New York 2015 featured by JoAnne Artman Gallery.
- Art Silicon Valley, San Francisco 2015 featured by Amstel Gallery.
- Art Wynwood, Miami 2017 featured by Limited Edition Gallery.
- Solo Show 70 Años de Ferrari, Espacio Ferrari Buenos Aires, Argentina.

== Honors ==
- Young Artist Revelation, Casa Rosada, President Carlos Saúl Menem 1993.
- Casa Rosada Exhibition Prize awarded by President Carlos Saúl Menem 26/07/1999.
