= Octavio Hernandez =

Octavio Hernandez may refer to:

- Octavio Hernández (banker)
- Octavio Hernandez (politician)
