= Osvaldo Civile =

Argentine guitarist (1958–1999)

Background information
- Also known as: Cetorca, Borracho
- Born: 21 October 1958; Caseros, Buenos Aires, Argentina
- Died: 28 April 1999 (aged 40)
- Genres: Heavy metal, thrash metal
- Occupation: Guitarist
- Years active: 1982–1999
- Formerly of: V8; Horcas

Osvaldo Daniel Civile (21 October 1958 – 28 April 1999) was an Argentine heavy metal guitarist. He was the guitarist for the bands V8 and Horcas.

== Biography ==
Civile was born in Caseros, Buenos Aires, and began his music career in the band Té de brujas. The guitarist of V8, Ricardo Moreno, left the band in 1982 for health reasons and proposed Civile as his replacement. The drummer Alejandro Colantonio left the band as well, and was replaced by Gustavo Rowek. The lineup of Civile, Rowek, Ricardo Iorio and Alberto Zamarbide is the most famous one of the band. They recorded two long plays, Luchando por el Metal (English: Fighting for metal) and Un paso más en la batalla (English: Another step in the battle). The band moved to Santos, Brazil, attempting to continue their career there. The project was abandoned and the band returned to Argentina in 1985, but Civile stayed in Brazil because his wife was ill.

Civile returned to Argentina in 1988. He created a thrash metal band, Horcas. Civile was the lead guitarist, Adrián Zucchi the second guitarist, Eddie Walker the bassist, Gabriel Ganzo the drummer, and Hugo Benítez the singer. Zucchi left the band, which recorded its first LP, Reinará la tempestad (English: The tempest will rule), in 1990. The second work, Oíd mortales el grito sangrado (English: Hear, mortals, the bleeding cry), had two new members, Oscar Castro as second guitarist and Norberto Yañez as drummer. They played with Metallica, Motörhead, Exodus, Kreator and Ratos de Porão.

The band got a new singer, Christian Bertoncelli, and went many years without new productions. Horcas took part in the Metal Rock Festival, a festival with the bands Rata Blanca and Logos, closed by a reunion of V8. Gustavo Rowek and Alberto Zamarbide were members of those two bands. The reunion was controversial because Ricardo Iorio, leader of V8, refused to take part in it. The reunion of V8 was recorded in a live CD, "Homenaje".

The third CD, Vence (English: Triumphs), was made with a new line-up. Sebastián Coria as the second guitarist, Guillermo de Luca as drummer, and Walter Meza as vocalist. The band became popular again. They headed the second edition of the Metal Rock Festival, this time a common festival.

Civile on the cover of the magazine Epopeya #22, April 1999, in photograph intended as cover art for the Eternos CD

The band recorded a new CD, Eternos (English: Eternals), in January 1999. The art for the CD, published in an interview by the magazine Epopeya #22 (April 1999), included photos of Civile playing truco with the Grim Reaper (who was Walter Meza with a hood). He performed in his last concert with Horcas on 23 April at the pub El Duende. He commented to the band that he was planning to retire from music. In the following days he saluted other people close to him. Although some initial versions stated he committed suicide shooting himself in the chest, the official cause of death is catalogued as doubtful since it happened on 28 April 1999 and there are reasons to believe that he was murdered. Newspapers that reported Civile's death used the pictures of him with the Grim Reaper to accompany the story. Gustavo Rowek pointed out that Civile had problems with alcoholism and frequent episodes of depression. He was buried at the Podesta Municipal Cemetery. The band edited the Eternos CD and continued their career, but used different cover art for it.

== Discography ==
With V8

- Luchando por el Metal – 1983
- Un paso más en la batalla – 1985
- No se rindan – 1991 (Compilation)
- Homenaje – 1996 (Live)

With Horcas

- Reinará la Tempestad – 1990
- Oíd Mortales el Grito Sangrado – 1992
- Vence – 1997
- Eternos – 1999
