= Walter Giardino Temple =

Argentine musical project

Temple
- From left to right: Ruben Trombini, Fernando Scarcella, Walter Giardino, Norberto Rodriguez and Pablo Catania (1999)

Background information
- Origin: Buenos Aires, Argentina
- Genres: Heavy metal, hard rock
- Years active: 1998–2000, 2012, 2016-2017
- Members: Walter Giardino; Ronnie Romero; Fernando Scarcella; Javier Retamozo; Pablo Motyczak
- Past members: Norberto Rodriguez; Martin Carrizo; Pablo Catania; Rubén Trombini; Daniel Leonetti; Danilo Moschen; Miguel de Ipola; Joe Lynn Turner

Walter Giardino Temple (also known as Temple) is a musical project of Argentine guitar virtuoso Walter Giardino.

== History ==
=== First era ===
The band formed in 1998 following the dissolution of Rata Blanca and the project was halted in 2000 after Rata Blanca regrouped. The first line-up was Norberto Rodriguez on vocals, Martin Carrizo on drums, Pablo Catania on keyboards and Ruben Trombini on bass. The group also released an album called "Temple" with 10 songs, among which include the single Corte Porteño. The drummer Martin Carrizo (former A.N.I.M.A.L.), left the band shortly after recording the album to work with Gustavo Cerati, and was replaced by Fernando Scarcella. The debut album was well received and performed several concerts in the provinces and Buenos Aires. After some discussion after a recital in which Giardino not let the musicians go up to play "Burn" with Glenn Hughes arguing that they did not know how to play properly, they decided to leave Giardino and form the band "Quemar" (Spanish from Burn) with which they released an album. Giardino with Scarcella (the only member who does not walk away from the strip), join guest musicians to perform some functions in Buenos Aires. One of the guest musicians was Adrián Barilari (current singer of Rata Blanca), who gave a show at the disco "Museum", which first introduced the acoustic version of "Mujer Amante" (included as bonus on the album "Grandes canciones" "Rata Blanca). Then the tour of South America was joined by Hugo Bistolfi on keyboards and Guillermo Sanchez on bass (both members of Rata Blanca), which resulted in the return of Rata Blanca. Sergio Berdichevsky and Gustavo Rowek (the other historical members Rata Blanca) did not accept, preferring to continue with their project "Nativo". Because of this Giardino decided to reform the band making a quintet, with just him on guitar, Fernando Scarcella turn held the position of drummer. In his final concerts as Walter Giardino Temple, the band had presented some new tracks like "Revancha" and "La Gran Batalla" (which appears to be part of a new album by Temple in the future).

=== During the hiatus ===
Walter Giardino made live appearances with the Spanish group Mägo de Oz following the departure of the members of Temple. In 2010 Rata Blanca made presentations in English with former Rainbow singer Doogie White, he sang songs in English from Temple as Corte Porteño renamed as Crushed Memories. Many people saw this event as one of Temple more than Rata Blanca because they were not and Adrián Barilari and Hugo Bistolfi (replaced by Danilo Moschen). Doogie commented that he was very impressed when he first heard Corte Porteño in 2003 because he thought he heard one of the best guitar solos heard in his life. Graham Bonnet alike who made a special presentation with Giardino and Greg Smith (former Rainbow bassist) in December 2010 played several English versions of Temple songs. Earlier this year Norberto Rodriguez made a series of appearances with his band Arian called "Reviviendo el disco de Temple" (Reviving Temple) where he sang all the tracks of the album.

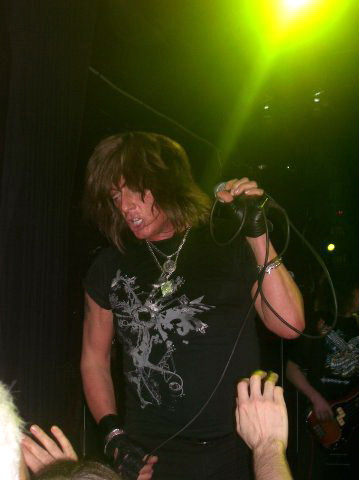
Joe Lynn Turner toured with Temple in 2012 and 2016

=== Shows with Joe Lynn Turner (2012/2016) ===
In September 2012, Giardino reactivate Temple to bring concerts tribute to Deep Purple, Rainbow and Yngwie Malmsteen's Rising Force with Joe Lynn Turner. In 2016 Giardino and Turner were touring South America (Argentina, Chile, Uruguay, Paraguay and Bolivia). The line up for this shows were Fernando Scarcella (drums) Pablo Motyczak (bass) Javier Retamozo (keyboards). Javier Barrozo was invited as vocalist of Temple's original songs.

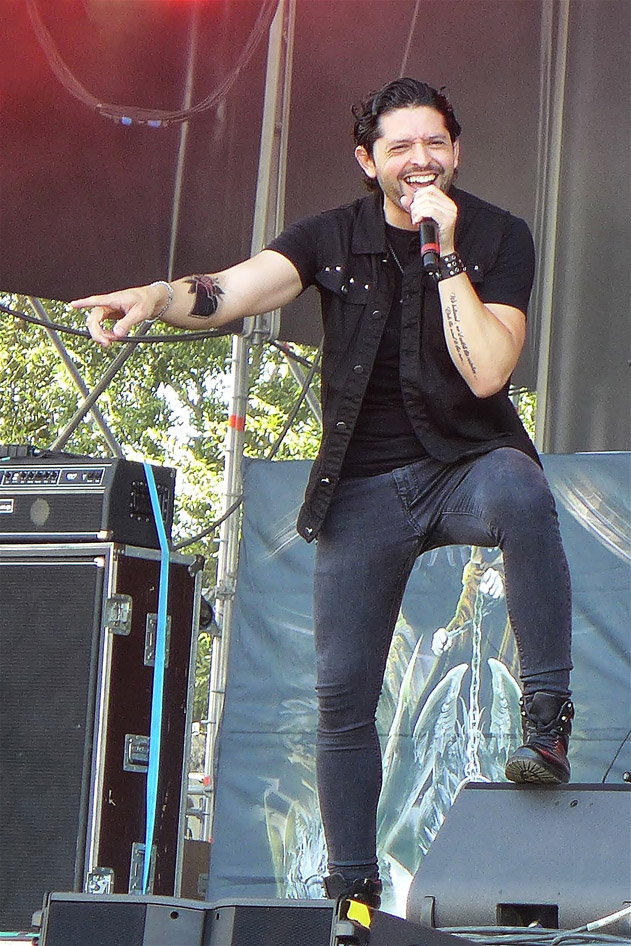
Ronnie Romero toured Europe and South America with Temple

=== Tour with Ronnie Romero ===
In November 2017, Giardino presented Ronnie Romero as new vocalist of Temple. The band toured 17 dates in Europe (Spain, England, Scotland, Germany, Czech Republic) and South America (Argentina, Bolivia and Chile).

== Members ==
=== Last line-up ===
- Walter Giardino - Guitars - (1998–2000, 2012, 2016 - 2017)
- Ronnie Romero - Vocals - (2017)
- Fernando Scarcella - Drums - (1999–2000, 2012, 2016 - 2017)
- Javier Retamozo - Keyboards - (2016 – 2017)
- Pablo Motyczak - Bass - (2012, 2016 – 2017)

=== Other members ===
- Norberto Rodriguez - Vocals - (1998–1999)
- Martín Carrizo - Drums - (1998; died 2022)
- Ruben Trombini - Bass - (1998 - 1999)
- Pablo Catania - Keyboards - (1998–1999)
- Daniel Leonetti - Bass - (2000)
- Luis Sánchez - Drums - (1998)
- Miguel de Ipola - Keyboards - (2000)
- Adrián Barilari - Guest Vocals - (2000)
- Danilo Moschen - Keyboards - (2012)
- Javier Barrozo - Vocals - (2012, 2016)
- Joe Lynn Turner - Guest Vocals - (2012, 2016)

== Discography ==
=== Tracks ===
1. Corte Porteño - (W.Giardino)
2. Sobre la raya - (W.Giardino)
3. Los amigos del campeón - (N.Rodriguez / W.Giardino)
4. Astróloga - (W.Giardino)
5. Héroe de la eternidad- (W.Giardino)
6. Azul y negro - (W.Giardino)
7. Cacería - (N.Rodriguez / W.Giardino)
8. La danza del fuego - (W.Giardino)
9. El club de las almas perdidas - (W.Giardino)
10. Alquimia - (W.Giardino)

=== Other songs ===
The band also composed other songs for future album but some of this were edited on Rata Blanca album El Camino del Fuego. The ones that were never released but appear in the latest setlists of Temple concerts are:

- Revancha
- La Gran Batalla en el Cielo

Also Doogie White translate some songs of Temple:

- Over The Line (Sobre La Raya)
- Crushed Memories (Corte Porteño)
- Blue and Black (Azul y Negro)
