= Active Power =

American uninterruptible power supply manufacturer

Active Power, Inc.
- Type: Privately Held
- Industry: Industrial Electrical Equipment
- Founded: 1992; 34 years ago
- Headquarters: 2128 W Braker Lane, BK 12; Austin, Texas 78758
- Key people: Jack Pearce (CEO)
- Products: Flywheel Energy Storage; Uninterruptible Power Storage; Emergency Power System; Modular Data Center
- Number of employees: 100
- Parent: Langley Holdings
- Website: activepower.com

Active Power Inc. designs, manufactures, sells, and services flywheel-based uninterruptible power supply (UPS) products that use kinetic energy to provide short-term power as an alternative to conventional battery-based UPS products. The company also designs and manufactures modular devices that integrate critical power components into a pre-packaged, purpose built enclosure that can include Active Power’s UPS products as a component. Active Power's products are often used in a number of industries including data centers, industrial/manufacturing, healthcare, transportation, broadcast, government, and casino/gaming due to the high reliability and long life cycle relative to alternative solutions. To date, Active Power has shipped more than 6,200 flywheels in UPS systems, delivering more than 1 gigawatt of critical backup power to customers in more than 50 countries around the world.

== History ==
=== 1992–2000 ===
- Active Power was founded in 1992 as Magnetic Bearing Technologies, Inc., where the company manufactured magnetic bearings for a variety of applications.
- In 1996, the company changed its name to Active Power and the following year introduced its first flywheel DC product.
- In 1999, Active Power deployed its first flywheel UPS product which fully integrates flywheel energy storage and power electronics.

=== 2001–2009 ===
- In 2007, the company opened its APAC headquarters in China.

=== 2010–present ===
- In 2010, The University of Texas at Austin chose to deploy Active Power UPS at its university data center.
- In 2011, Active Power shipped its 3,000th flywheel.
- In 2011, Active Power received a multimillion-dollar, multiple PowerHouse order from Hewlett-Packard.
- In 2012, Heineken selected Active Power to provide critical power protection at its bottling facility off the coast of Madagascar.
- In 2013, the company shipped its 4,000th flywheel including its next generation CleanSource HD UPS product.
- In 2014, Capgemini selected Active Power to provide critical power infrastructure for a UK data center expansion.
- In 2014, Verizon Terremark significantly expanded the power capacity of their Silicon Valley data center by deploying four PowerHouse units.
- In 2016, it was acquired by Piller Power Systems. The new system with longer UPS runtime was launched.
