= Arturo Rodríguez (artist) =

Cuban American painter (born 1956)

- Born: February 6, 1956 (age 70); Ranchuelo, Villa Clara Province, Cuba
- Other names: Arturo Rodriguez, Hierommus Fromm
- Education: Miami Dade Community College
- Occupation: Visual artist
- Known for: Painting
- Spouse: Demi

Arturo Rodríguez (born 1956) is a Cuban-born American visual artist. He is a painter, but also works in other mediums including NFTs. He is best known for his psychologically charged, figurative paintings. He lives in Miami, Florida.

== Biography ==
Arturo Rodríguez was born on February 6, 1956, in Ranchuelo, Villa Clara Province, Cuba. In either 1971 or 1973, when he was a teenager his family moved from Cuba to Asturias and Madrid in Spain; followed by a move in 1973 or 1976 to Miami, where they settled. He attended Miami Dade Community College (now Miami Dade College). In his early career he used the pseudonym Hierommus Fromm to illustrate children's books.

He met his future wife at an art opening at Meeting Point Gallery in Miami in 1978, artist Demi, whom he married in 1984. His artwork is often influenced by his relationship with his wife. He is considered a self-taught painter.

His artwork is in public museum and art collections, including the Whitney Museum of American Art, the Metropolitan Museum of Art, Smithsonian American Art Museum, the Israel Museum, Norton Museum of Art, Cintas Foundation, Bass Museum, Perez Art Museum Miami, Polk Museum of Art, Center for the Arts in Vero Beach, Tampa Museum of Art, Museum of Art Fort Lauderdale, Lowe Art Museum, Gulf Coast Museum of Art, Boca Raton Museum of Art, the Frost Art Museum, Museum of Latin American Art, and the Miami-Dade Public Library System.

In 1987, Rodriguez gifted the painting "Exiliados" to Pope John Paul II on the occasion of his visit to Florida International University, which commissioned the painting.

== See also ==
- Aaron Gilbert
- List of Cuban artists
