= Aaron Gilbert =

Cuban-American artist

Aaron J. Gilbert
- Born: 1979 (age 46–47)
- Education: Pennsylvania State University, Rhode Island School of Design, Yale University
- Known for: Painting
- Notable work: "The New One" (2007) Painting
- Children: 2

Aaron J. Gilbert (born 1979), also known as "AJ", is an American visual artist. He is known for creating symbolically and psychologically charged narrative paintings. He lives and works in Brooklyn.

== Biography ==
Gilbert was born in 1979 in Altoona, Pennsylvania. He is of Cuban descent.

Gilbert attended Pennsylvania State University and in 2000 received an Associate of Science in mechanical engineering technology. He returned to school at Rhode Island School of Design (RISD) and in 2005 received a Bachelor of Fine Arts degree in Painting. In 2008, he received his Master of Fine Arts degree from Yale University in Painting. Prior to his full time career as an artist, he worked in CAD and as an Engineering Technician in the biomedical industry.

He was previously married to photographer Deana Lawson and together they have two children. Lawson and Gilbert's work is mutually influential, and much of Gilbert's artwork depicts Lawson and their children. His paintings feature a bright and moody palette, and staged but self-aware subjects.

In 2010, Gilbert was awarded the Rosenthal Family Foundation Award for Painting. He is a 2015 Louis Comfort Tiffany Award recipient, and has been awarded by the American Academy of Arts and Letters as the 2010 “Young American Painter of Distinction.” His work is currently in the permanent collection of the Brooklyn Museum of Art, the Whitney Museum, and the Studio Museum in Harlem. Residencies include a 2013 Fountainhead Residency, a 2012 Yaddo residency, a 2008 LMCC Workspace Residency as well as the 2008 Affiliate Fellowship of the American Academy in Rome.

He has exhibited his work at PPOW New York (2021), Deitch Projects New York (2008), among others. In the fall of 2020, he had a two-person show with Martin Wong at PPOW New York which was reviewed in The New York Times and Art in America.

== Exhibitions ==
- 2008 – Conceptual Figures, Deitch Projects, New York City, New York
- 2008–2009 – The New Akademiks, Galerie Schuster, Berlin, Germany
- 2009 – The Open, Deitch Studios Long Island City, Long Island City, New York
- 2012 – Lessico Famigliare (Family Talk), FUTURA Center for Contemporary Art, Prague, Czech Republic
- 2013 – Exposure, Spinello Projects, EXPO Chicago, Navy Pier, Chicago, Illinois
- 2013 – Bent In, Primetime Gallery, Brooklyn, New York
- 2014 – Selfies & Friends: Contemporary Portraiture, Cade Tompkins Projects, Providence, Rhode Island
- 2014 – Aaron Gilbert: Possessed, Mottahedan Projects, Dubai, UAE
- 2016 – "BRIC Biennial: Volume 2 – Bed Stuy/Crown Heights Edition", BRIC, Brooklyn, New York
- 2019 – Solo Booth with Lulu, Mexico City, NADA, Miami
- 2019 – Psychic Novellas, Lyles & King, New York City, New York
- 2021 – 1981–2001, Martin Wong / Aaron Gilbert, P·P·O·W. Gallery, New York
- 2021 – Chris Sharp Gallery, Los Angeles, California

== Awards ==
- 2010 – Rosenthal Family Foundation Award for Painting
- 2015 – Louis Comfort Tiffany Foundation Biennial Award

== See also ==
- Arturo Rodríguez
- List of Cuban artists
