= Demi (artist) =

Cuban-born American visual artist (born 1955)

- Born: October 6, 1955 (age 70); Camagüey, Camagüey Province, Cuba
- Other names: DEMI, Demi Rodríguez
- Education: Miami Dade Community College
- Occupation: Visual artist
- Known for: Painting
- Spouse: Arturo Rodríguez

Demi (born 1955) also known as Demi Rodríguez, is a Cuban-born American visual artist, known for her paintings of children. She lives in Miami, Florida.

== Biography ==
She was born on October 6, 1955, in Camagüey, Camagüey Province, Cuba. Demi is not her name from birth, however she primarily uses the mononym for her work. When she was young her father was executed in Cuba for political reasons. At the age of 6 she was sent to Puerto Rico to live with relatives she had not previously met. In 1971, Demi moved to Florida to join her family.

She attended Miami Dade Community College (now Miami Dade College), and received an A.A. degree.

In her early career she worked as a bookkeeper. In 1984, Demi married artist Arturo Rodríguez, whom she had met in 1978 at the former Meeting Point Gallery in Miami. Demi started painting in 1984 by learning from Arturo, and she began exhibiting her art in 1987. Her art primarily focuses on the portraits of children, often shown in situations that are trapping. She uses her practice to raise awareness for children’s rights.

Her artwork is in public museum collections, including the Lowe Art Museum, Museum of Art Fort Lauderdale, Gulf Coast Museum of Art, the Frost Art Museum, Tampa Museum of Art, and the Smithsonian American Art Museum. She is one of the featured artists of Feminist Art Base at the Brooklyn Museum.

== See also ==
- List of Cuban artists
- List of Cuban women artists
