= Luchando por el Metal =

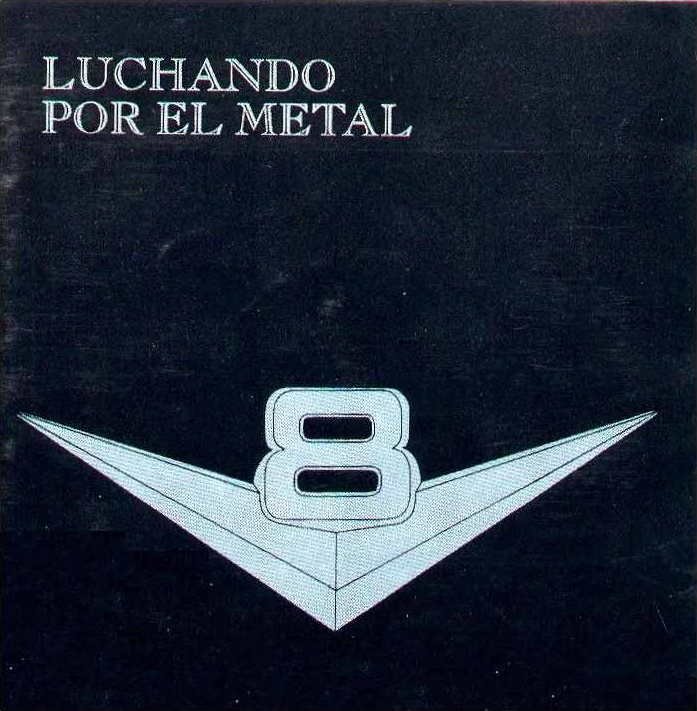

Studio album by V8
- Released: 1983
- Recorded: March–April 1983; Edipo Studios, Buenos Aires
- Genre: Heavy metal; speed metal
- Length: 27:08
- Label: Umbral, Radio Tripoli
- Producer: Ramón Villanueva

V8 chronology
Luchando por el Metal (1983)	Un Paso Mas En La Batalla (1985)

Luchando por el Metal ("Fighting for the Metal") is the first studio album by Argentine heavy metal band V8, released in March 1983. At the time the album was released, the genre was very popular, and this album became second in popularity, only behind Riff.

The biggest hits of the albums were: "Destrucción", "Brigadas Metálicas" and "Hiena De Metal", the last song with Pappo's participation.

== Track listing ==
- All song written by Ricardo Iorio, Osvaldo Civile, Alberto Zamarbide and Gustavo Rowek.
1. "Destrucción" – 2:00
2. "Parcas sangrientas" – 2:56
3. "Si puedes vencer al temor" – 5:53
4. "Ángeles de las tinieblas" – 2:30
5. "Tiempos metálicos" – 2:26
6. "Muy cansado estoy" – 3:20
7. "Brigadas metálicas" – 3:01
8. "Torturador" – 2:30
9. "Hiena de metal" – 1:38

== Personnel ==
V8

- Ricardo Iorio – bass, backing vocals
- Osvaldo Civile – lead guitar
- Alberto Zamarbide – lead vocals
- Gustavo Rowek – drums

Guests

- Pappo – lead guitar and vocals on "Hiena De Metal"
- Marcelo Vitale – keyboards on "Si Puedes Vencer al Temor"
