= Horcas =

Argentinian heavy metal band

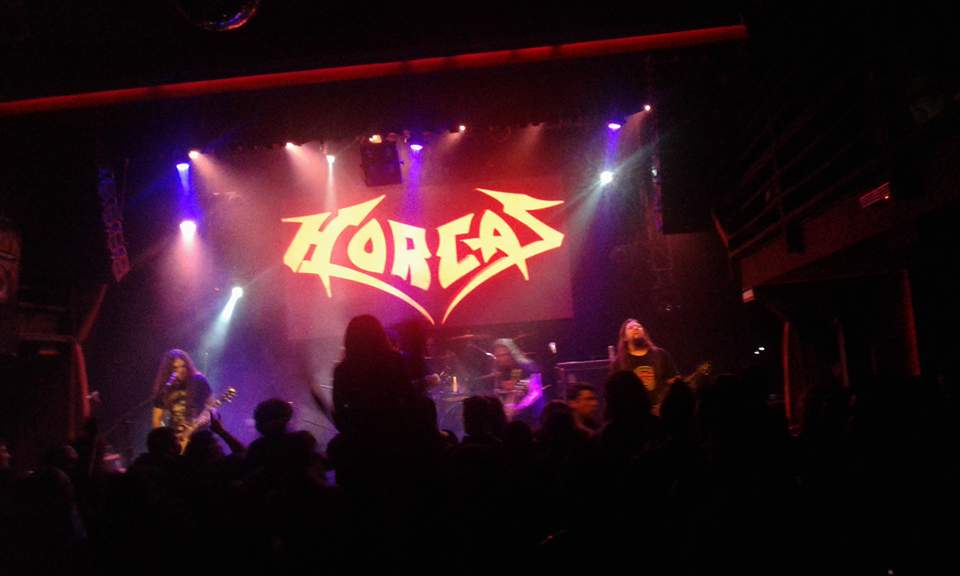
- Horcas performing in 2017

Background information
- Origin: Buenos Aires
- Genres: Thrash metal, heavy metal, groove metal
- Years active: 1988–present
- Label: Tocka Discos – Sony Music Entertainment (Argentina)
- Members: Walter Meza (vocals); Sebastián Coria (guitar); Topo Yáñez (bass); Cristian Romero (drums); Lucas Bravo (guitar)
- Past members: See below
- Website: www.horcasoficial.com.ar

Horcas is an Argentine heavy metal and thrash metal band formed in 1988 by Osvaldo Civile, former guitarist for V8, Argentina's landmark heavy metal outfit of the 1980s.

== History ==
=== 1985–1987: Pre-formation and background ===
After quitting V8 in 1985 and being impressed by the new generation of Bay Area thrash metal bands led by Metallica, Civile set out to form a new band in that style. The project, which initially included former V8 bandmate Gustavo Rowek on drums, was delayed for several reasons and did not begin to take shape until 1988. By then, frustrated by the constant postponements, Rowek had joined fellow former V8 member Walter Giardino in his new project, Rata Blanca. Civile continued working on the project with different musicians, including members of Metallian and Ziklon B, as well as vocalist Rodolfo Cava, but none of these early lineups materialized. Meanwhile, Cava also took part in the recording of Rata Blanca's first demo.

=== 1988–1990: Reinará la Tempestad ===
The first version of Horcas had Civile on lead guitar, Adrián Zucchi on rhythm, Eddie Walker on bass, Gabriel Ganzo on drums and Hugo Benítez on vocals. The band quickly garnered recognition in local heavy metal circles, mainly because of Civile's past as a V8 member, but also because they were among the first in Argentina to explore a more extreme style within the genre. In 1990, Horcas landed their first recording deal with indie label Radio Trípoli, and as a quartet, since Zucchi had left the band, cut their first album Reinará la Tempestad.

=== 1991–1996: Oíd Mortales el Grito Sangrado ===
In 1991, bassist Eddie Walker left the band and was replaced by current member Norberto "Topo" Yáñez, while the rhythm guitar slot was filled by Oscar Castro. With this line-up they released in 1992 their second effort Oíd Mortales el Grito Sangrado ("Hear, oh mortals, the bleeding cry", a twist on the opening line of the Argentine Anthem: "Oíd mortales el grito sagrado" -"Hear, oh mortals, the sacred cry"-). During 1993, the band was chosen to open for Metallica, Motörhead, Kreator and Exodus on their Argentinian dates. However, there were soon to be internal frictions, which ended up in Civile firing all of the band members except for bassist Topo Yáñez, in less than a year. This situation, which forced Civile to reform the band almost from scratch, together with major problems with their label, which prevented Horcas from recording for 5 years.

=== 1997–1999: Vence – Eternos – Civile's death ===
On 1997, with a new line-up which included current members Sebastián Coria on guitar, Guillermo De Luca on drums and Walter Meza on vocals, Horcas were able to record their third album Vence. The album yielded the track "Argentina, Tus Hijos", also to be the band's first video clip. At that time Civile is quoted as saying that after 7 years he had finally put together the band he had strived so many years for. At the beginning of 1999, Horcas returned to the studio to cut its fourth album Eternos, which was to become Civile's last recording. On 24 April 1999 Civile played with Horcas for the last time. Five days later, on 29 April he was found shot dead in his home. The cause of his death was ultimately never clarified.

=== 1999–2003: Horcas – Vive ===
The remaining band members decided to continue as Horcas in tribute to Civile, which led them to face legal action for unauthorized use of the name. The band then enlisted guitarist Gabriel Lis and went on their first international tour that included Mexico, Bolivia, Uruguay and Brazil to promote Eternos. On 2001 the band included a V8 cover song in the tribute album entitled Brigadas Metálicas. In 2002 Horcas were signed by indie label El Pie Records and recorded their fifth studio album, the first without Osvaldo Civile. The album was called simply Horcas and yielded such songs as "Esperanza" and "Reacción". The next year, the band released their first live album Vive, recorded on 13 September 2003 during a gig at Hangar in Buenos Aires. They also included a Metallica cover song in the tribute album entitled Mátenlos a todos.

=== 2004–2006: Demencial ===
2004 began with the band opening for Iron Maiden at José Amalfitani Stadium in Buenos Aires for an audience of 40,000. Shortly after, they changed management and touring became more extensive on a national scale and began to include international dates on a regular basis. The band included a Black Sabbath cover song in the tribute album entitled Sabbath Crosses, and a Panzer cover song in the tribute album entitled Despertando al innombrable. On 18 November 2004, Horcas released Demencial, their last album for El Pie Records. During the "Demencial Tour", which began on 18 December 2004 in Buenos Aires at a sold-out El Teatro, Horcas toured Argentina, Ecuador, Venezuela, Uruguay and Colombia where they headlined the second stage of Rock al Parque Festival in Bogotá on 14 October 2006. Also for the first time in their career they performed outside Latin America: on 30 April 2006, Horcas played at Viña Rock Festival in Spain.

=== 2006–2008: Asesino ===
In 2006 Horcas were signed by SoyRock/TockaDiscos – Sony BMG, their first contract with a major label. Under this deal they released on 26 October 2006 their eighth album Asesino, which took a more "modern metal/post-thrash metal" approach and received mixed reviews. That same year the band included a Judas Priest cover song in the tribute album entitled Acero argentino and a Riff cover song in the tribute album entitled Que sea rocka. The "Asesino Tour" 2007–2008 included almost 100 dates which included a slot in the Vive Latino festival in Santiago, Chile on 15 April 2007 and opening for Megadeth in Buenos Aires in May 2008.

=== 2008–2012: Reviviendo Huestes / 20th anniversary Live CD and DVD ===
On 16 October 2008 Horcas released their ninth album Reviviendo huestes. With a title that recalls the name of the song "Reviviendo las Huestes" included on their first album, Horcas seemed to suggest a return to the roots with a remake of their track "Solución Suicida" which closes the album.

During 2009 and 2010 Horcas hit the road with the "RH Tour", which included opening gigs for Iron Maiden on 28 March 2009 at José Amalfitani Stadium for an audience of 40,000, and for Metallica on 21 January 2010 at River Plate stadium for a crowd of 60,000. On 15 May 2010 Horcas recorded their tenth album and first DVD live at a sold-out Teatro Colegiales in Buenos Aires as part of a series of events to take place throughout 2010 in celebration of their 20th anniversary. On 6 December 2010 Horcas released their tenth album and first DVD under the title of La Maldición Continúa. The release is available in two formats: Standard (only CD) and Full (CD + DVD). At the beginning of 2011 Horcas took to the road with their new "Maldición Tour".

=== 2012–present: Por Tu Honor, Gritando Verdades, El Diablo and line-up changes ===
In 2012, Gabriel Lis left the band and was replaced by Lucas Simcic. In 2013 with Simcic the band released the album Por Tu Honor. Drummer Guillermo DeLucca left Horcas in 2016 being replaced by Mariano Elias Martin. In 2018 they published their most recent album Gritando Verdades.During the pandemic period for Covid-19 Martin and Simcic left the band. The band recruited Cristian Romero (drums) and Lucas Bravo (guitars) both also members of thrash metal band Morthifera, which eventually disbanded. In 2021, Lucas Bravo featured as a guest on 1917's album 'Omnicrisis'. On 2024 Horcas released an album entitled El Diablo.

== Albums ==
- 1990: Reinará la tempestad
- 1992: Oíd mortales el grito sangrado
- 1997: Vence
- 1999: Eternos
- 2002: Horcas
- 2003: Vive
- 2004: Demencial
- 2006: Asesino
- 2008: Reviviendo Huestes
- 2010: La Maldición Continúa
- 2013: Por tu Honor
- 2018: Gritando Verdades
- 2024: El Diablo
