= Magos, espadas y rosas =

Studio album by Rata Blanca
- Released: April 24, 1990
- Recorded: October 1989 – February 1990
- Studio: Estudios Buenos Aires
- Genre: Heavy metal; hard rock
- Length: 54:24
- Label: Polydor Records
- Producer: Mario Sanguinet, Rata Blanca

Rata Blanca chronology
Rata Blanca (1988)	Magos, espadas y rosas (1990)	Guerrero del Arco Iris (1991)

Magos, espadas y rosas (Wizards, Swords, and Roses) is the second album by Argentine heavy metal band Rata Blanca. The album was released in 1990 by Polydor Records and is the best-selling heavy metal album from Argentina, with over one million copies sold.

The album was originally issued on vinyl LP and cassette and featured seven tracks. Two bonus tracks were added to the CD release, "Preludio Obsesivo" and "Otoño Medieval", both of which were previously included on their self-titled debut from 1988. It is the band's first album with Adrián Barilari on lead vocals.

== Track listing ==
All songs are written by Walter Giardino, except where noted.

1. "La Leyenda del Hada y el Mago" [The Legend of the Fairy and the Wizard] (Roxana Giardino, W. Giardino) – 5:24
2. "Mujer Amante" [Lover Woman] (W. Giardino, Adrián Barilari) – 6:05
3. "El Beso de la Bruja" [Witch's Kiss] – 4:19
4. "Haz Tu Jugada" [Make Your Move] – 6:22
5. "El Camino del Sol" [The Path of the Sun] – 9:28
6. "Días Duros" [Hard Days] (Carlos Perigo, W. Giardino) – 7:24
7. "Porque es tan difícil amar" [Because It's So Hard to Love] (instrumental) – 5:33
8. "Preludio Obsesivo" [Obsessive Prelude] (instrumental, CD bonus track) – 3:40
9. "Otoño Medieval" [Medieval Autumn] (instrumental, CD bonus track) – 2:34

== Personnel ==
Rata Blanca

- Adrián Barilari – vocals
- Walter Giardino – lead guitars
- Sergio Berdichevsky – rhythm guitars
- Guillermo Sánchez – bass
- Gustavo Rowek – drums, percussion
- Hugo Bistolfi – keyboards

Production

- Mario Sanguinet – recording, mastering
- José Luis Botto – management
- Eduardo Rodríguez – management
- José Luis Massa – photography
- Roberto Ricci – executive producer
- Pablo Iotti – artwork
- Oscar Festa – artwork
