= El Reino Olvidado =

Studio album by Rata Blanca
- Released: August 21, 2008
- Recorded: February – March 2008 at La Nave de Oseberg, Buenos Aires, Argentina
- Genre: Hard rock, heavy metal
- Length: 55:16
- Label: PopArt Music
- Producer: Walter Giardino

Rata Blanca chronology
La Llave de la Puerta Secreta (2005)	El Reino Olvidado (2008)	Tormenta Eléctrica (2015)

English Version Cover

Singles from El Reino Olvidado
- 1. "El Reino Olvidado"; 2. "Talismán"; 3. "El Círculo de Fuego"; 4. "El Guardián de la Luz"

El Reino Olvidado (The Forgotten Kingdom) is the ninth studio album by the Argentine band Rata Blanca. The album was edited and released on August 21 of 2008 by PopArt Music. Two weeks after the release date the album obtained the gold album certification.

An English-language version of the album was recorded with Doogie White (Rainbow, Yngwie Malmsteen) on the vocals. The English version was released on October 28 of 2009.

The album (Spanish version) received a Latin Grammy Award nomination for Best Rock Vocal Album, Duo or Group.

== Track listing ==
=== Original Version ===
No.	Title	Writer(s)	Length
1.	"Las Voces del Mar (intro) (Voices of the sea)"	Walter Giardino	1:52
2.	"El Reino Olvidado (The forgotten kingdom)"	Walter Giardino	5:37
3.	"71-06 (Endorfina) (71-06 endorphin)"	Walter Giardino	4:09
4.	"Talismán (Talisman)"	Walter Giardino	5:16
5.	"El Círculo de Fuego (The circle of fire)"	Walter Giardino	4:57
6.	"Diario de Una Sombra (Diary of a shadow)"	Walter Giardino	4:22
7.	"Madre Tierra (Mother earth)" (Instrumental)	Walter Giardino	4:16
8.	"El Guardián de la Luz (The guardian of light)"	Walter Giardino	6:10
9.	"Un Día Más, Un Día Menos (One day more, one day less)"	Walter Giardino	5:46
10.	"No Es Nada Fácil (Ser Vos) (It's not easy being you)"	Walter Giardino	4:01
11.	"Si Eres Hijo del Rock (If you're a son of rock)"	Walter Giardino	4:36
12.	"Cuando Hoy Es Ayer (When today is yesterday)"	Walter Giardino	4:14
Total length:			55:16

=== English Version ===
No.	Title	Writer(s)	Length
1.	"The Voices of the Sea (Intro)"	Walter Giardino	1:52
2.	"The Forgotten Kingdom"	Walter Giardino	5:37
3.	"Endorphins"	Walter Giardino	4:09
4.	"Talisman"	Walter Giardino	5:16
5.	"Ring of Fire"	Walter Giardino	4:57
6.	"Diary of a Shadow"	Walter Giardino	4:22
7.	"Instruments" (Instrumental)	Walter Giardino	4:16
8.	"Guardian of the Light"	Walter Giardino	6:10
9.	"Another Day Passing By"	Walter Giardino	5:46
10.	"It's Not Easy"	Walter Giardino	4:01
11.	"Sons of Rock"	Walter Giardino	4:36
12.	"Yesterday, Today and Tomorrow"	Walter Giardino	4:14
Total length:			55:16

== Videoclips ==
- El Reino Olvidado
- El Guardián de la Luz (also used in Guardian of the Light)
- Talismán
- El Círculo de Fuego

== Personnel ==
=== Band ===
- Walter Giardino - Guitars / Mixing / Producer
- Adrián Barilari - Vocals
- Guillermo Sanchez † - Bass
- Hugo Bistolfi - Keyboards
- Fernando Scarcella - Drums

=== Others ===
- Nayla Scalia - Vocals on "Las voces del mar"
- Doogie White - Vocals on album English version
- Martín Toledo - Sound engineer / Mixing
- Nicolás Rodríguez - Recording assistant
- Martín Gutiérrez - Recording assistant
- Gervasio Gigena - Guitar assistant
- Gustavo González - Drum assistant
- Claudio Aboy - Album illustrations
- Bruno Mencia - Album graphic design
- Mayra Cerbán - Packaging / Medals
