= Alberto Zamarbide =

Argentine singer

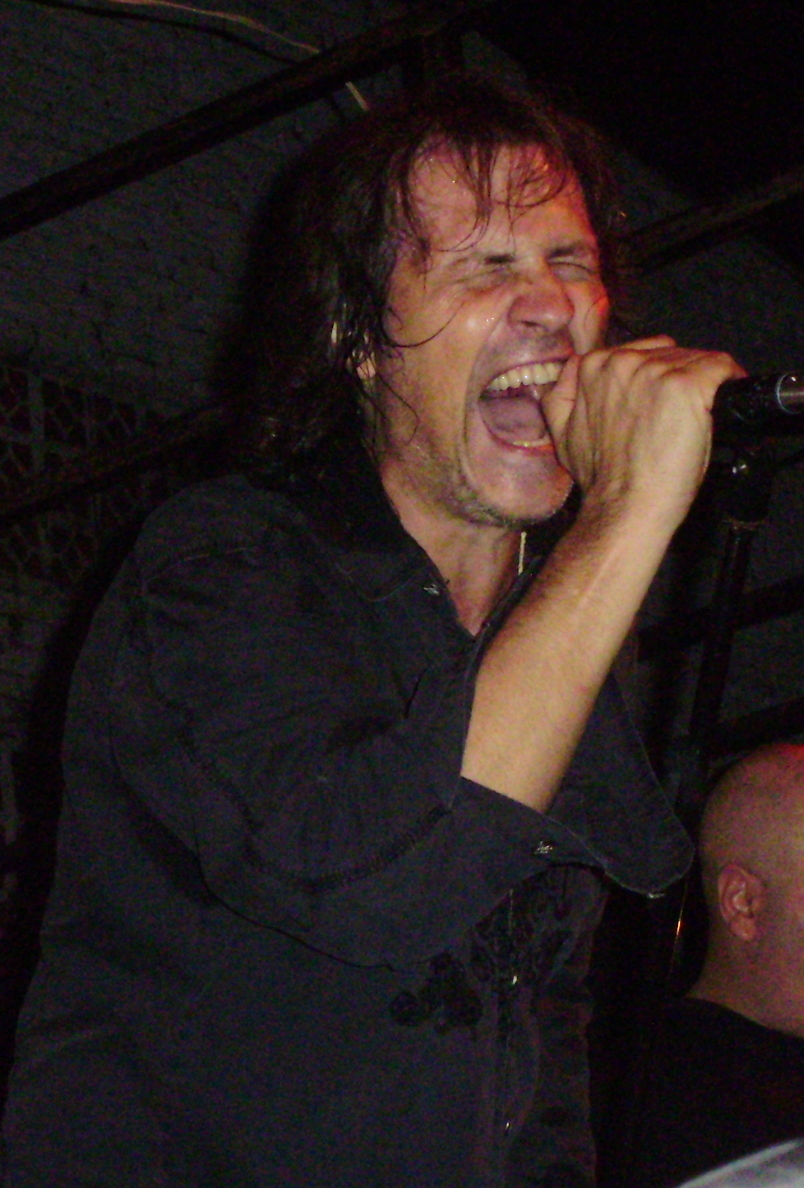

Background information
- Also known as: Beto Zamarbide
- Born: Alberto Zamarbide; 23 August 1960 (age 66); Buenos Aires, Argentina
- Genres: Christian metal; heavy metal
- Occupations: Singer; songwriter
- Years active: 1980–present
- Member of: V8; Logos; Primal

Alberto Zamarbide (born 23 August 1960) is an Argentine heavy metal singer with basque origins known for his work with bands like V8 and Logos.

== Biography ==
=== Early years ===
Alberto Zamarbide began his career as a vocalist in the band WC, with July Morano as guitarist and songwriter of the group. This line up also had Gustavo Rowek on drums. After a year of work and some shows in Buenos Aires, he organized together with Ricardo Iorio what would be the first heavy metal festival held in Argentina in March 1982, at the headquarters of Chacarita Juniors in the neighborhood of the cemetery, Buenos Aires. Zamarbide soon leaves the group and goes to Brazil for a while.

=== V8 ===
On his return, he found Ricardo Iorio, who invited him to sing in V8. Since then Zamarbide and Iorio worked together, through all the formations of the band. With the first next Osvaldo Civile and recorded Rowek Luchando Por El Metal (1983), and Un Paso Mas En La Batalla (1985), then this training is disintegrating, enter Miguel Roldán on guitar and Adrian Cenci on drums and recorded together El Fin De Los Inicuos (1987), the last V8 studio album. In a spiritual quest in the midst of an internal climate of addictions and lack of control, he converted to Evangelicalism.

=== Logos and new endeavours ===
In the early 1990s, start to learn to build guitars and basses with the master luthier Horacio Suarez and parallel enters the Conservatory to study the art of luthieria of stringed instruments, with the master Theodore Massi master luthier of Teatro Colón at Buenos Aires. After a few years with his friend and colleague Miguel Roldan founded Logos, and from then on, both continurán working together to present. In 1993, they released their first album with Logos, Industria de Poder, presenting the Germans with Accept, then produced by Rudy Sarzo (Quiet riot Ozzy Osbourne, Dio), recorded Generacion Mutante (1995), edited at United States, Puerto Rico and Spain. By the end of 1997, recorded Tercer Acto a live album in Buenos Aires in the Auditorio Promúsica.

In 1996, he closed the concert Tribute to V8 during Metal Rock Festival, held in Estadio Obras of Buenos Aires, along with their former colleagues Osvaldo Civile (Horcas), Gustavo Rowek (Rata Blanca) and Miguel Roldán (who takes Iorio's place at the bass) plays the old hits of V8. With this lineup recorded the only live album of the band, and even in March 1997 was the opening act of the show Kiss (with the original line-up) in the Estadio River Plate at Buenos Aires.

In early 1998, Zamarbide decided to settle in United States and commits to completing a personal dream: to obtain a college degree in Music Business career with a major in Creative Performance. It does this in Miami Dade College in Miami.

=== Return to Logos ===
In early 2004, after a hiatus of six years, Zamarbide and Roldán, meet again to continue the path of his band Logos. Thus, on 1 May this year, is presented for the first time in Europe, as part of the festival Viña Rock 2004 held in Murcia, Spain. After several tours visiting both major capitals, such as the far reaches of the interior, towards the end of 2006 recorded the band's new production titled Pla Mundial para la Destruccion and then in December 2007, recorded in the Pepsi Music Stadium on "Plan Mundial para la Destruccion Live". In 2008 began a tour of the interior, presenting their first DVD in Rosario Willie Dixon, and then performed over 50 concerts in Argentina, Chile, Uruguay, and Brazil, while recording their new studio plate A través de los tiempos (published in 2009), published in co-production with partner Pocho Andrade seal Hurling Metal Records in Argentina and Mexico. Started in 2009, along with Logos has traveled the country presenting his new album, and faces a U.S. tour while working on the pre-production on his next studio album. The tour is divided into three stages due to the number of concerts and ended the year on international tour after the album's release in Mexico ATDT.

=== Primal ===
Zamarbide joined a supergroup in 2014, alongside members of Deliverance, Vengeance Rising, Viking, Deathriders and Bloodlust. The band has been working on a self-titled debut album, which will be released through No Life Til Metal Records. The band features Guitarist Glenn Rogers (Vengeance Rising, Deliverance, Hirax), Drummer Jorge Iacobellis (Hirax), Guitarist Wagner Vincenzo, Bassist Sandy K. Vasquez (Bloodlust), and Guitarist Dave Watson (Ruthless, Shades of Crimson). In 2023 they released Humachine and played several gigs.. The band finally split up during 2026.

== Discography ==
=== V8 ===
- Demo (1982)
- Luchando Por El Metal (LP, 1983)
- Un Paso Mas En La Batalla (LP, 1985)
- El Fin De Los Inicuos (LP, 1986)
- No Se Rindan (Compilation, 1991)
- Homenaje (Live album, 1996)
- Antología (Compilation, 2001)

=== Logos ===
- Demo (1991)
- La Industria del Poder (LP, 1993)
- Generación Mutante (LP, 1995)
- Demo (1997)
- Tercer Acto (LP, 1998)
- Plan Mundial para la Destrucción (LP, 2006)
- Plan Mundial para la Destrucción (DVD) (2008)
- A través de los tiempos (LP, 2009)

=== Primal ===
- Primal (LP, 2018)
- Humachine (LP, 2023)
- Iron Age (EP, 2025)
