= Florida International Museum =

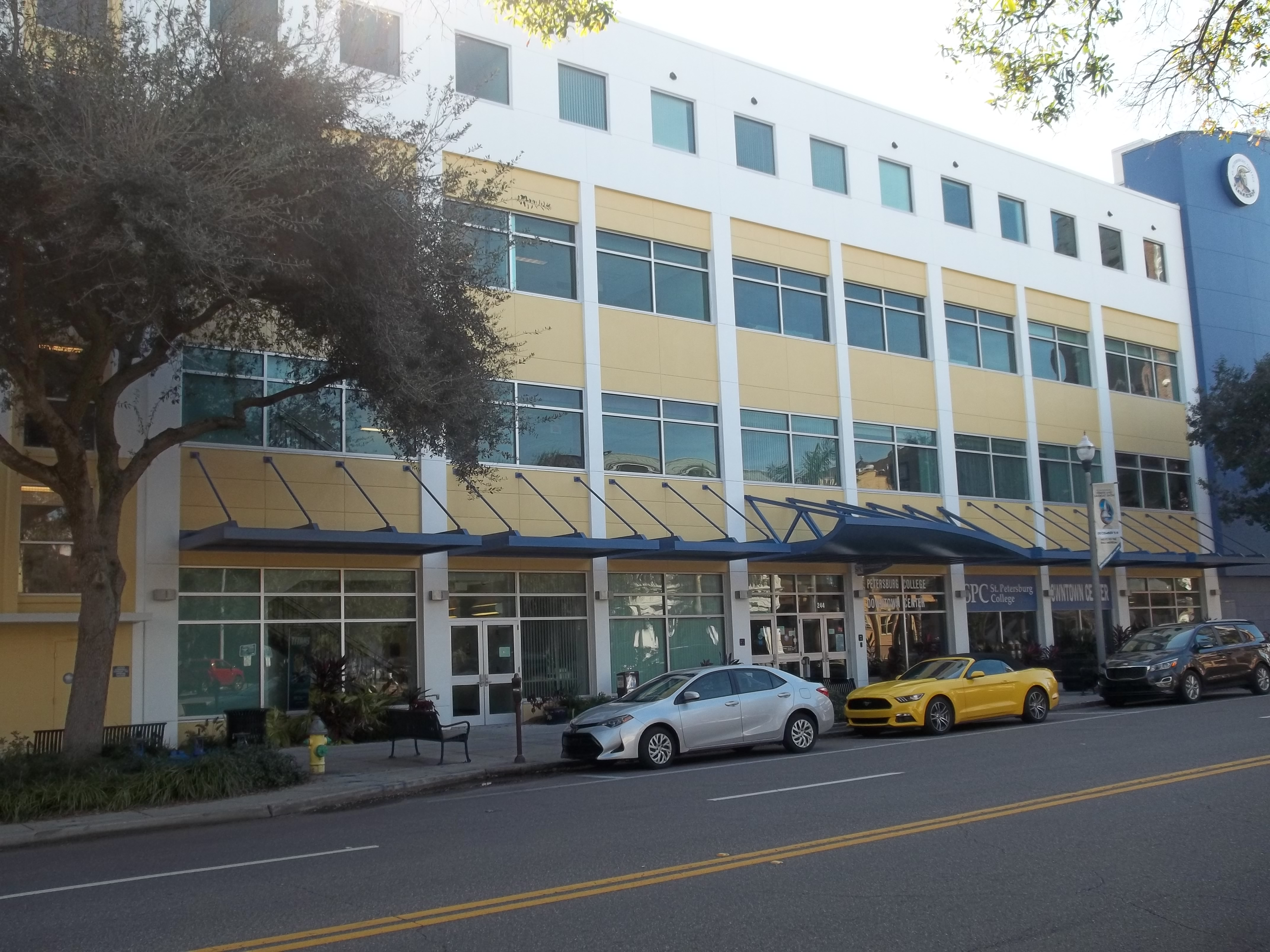

- Location within Florida
- Established: 1995
- Location: 244 Second Avenue N St. Petersburg College Downtown Center; St. Petersburg, Florida
- Coordinates: 27.7731°N 82.6367°W
- Website: Florida International Museum at St. Petersburg College

The Florida International Museum at St. Petersburg College was an art museum located at the Downtown Center location of St. Petersburg College at 244 Second Avenue N, St. Petersburg, Florida.

== History ==
The original Florida International Museum opened in 1995 in a former Maas Brothers department store and featured traveling blockbuster exhibitions, including "Treasures of the Czars" in 1995, "Splendors of Ancient Egypt" in 1996, "Alexander The Great" in 1996, "Titanic" in 1998, "Empire of Mystery" in 1999, "John F. Kennedy, The Exhibition" in 1999 - 2000 and "Diana, a Celebration" in 2005. In 2006 the museum moved to a smaller space in St. Petersburg College's Downtown Center. The original museum's final special exhibit was "Vatican Splendors" in 2008. The museum became a part of St. Petersburg College later in 2008, and was retitled.

== Gulf Coast Museum of Art Collection ==
The contemporary Florida art collections of the now-defunct Gulf Coast Museum of Art became part of the Florida International Museum at St. Petersburg College in 2009. The new museum's inaugural exhibit in 2009 was "In a New Light – Selections from the Gulf Coast Museum of Art Collection". The museum was permanently closed on December 4, 2010.
