= V8 (band) =

Argentine heavy metal band

Background information
- Origin: Buenos Aires, Argentina
- Genres: Heavy metal; speed metal
- Years active: 1979–1987
- Labels: Umbral; Radio Trípoli
- Spinoffs: Hermética; Rata Blanca; Horcas; Logos
- Past members: Ricardo Iorio; Alberto Zamarbide; Osvaldo Civile; Gustavo Rowek; Miguel Roldán; Adrián Cenci; Walter Giardino; Ricardo Moreno; Gerardo Osemberg
- Logo
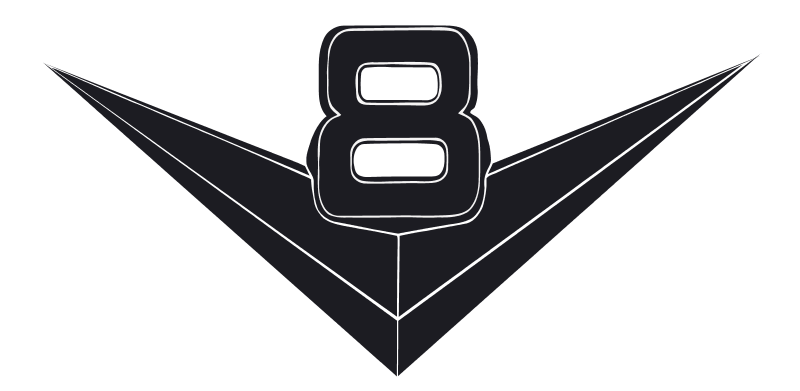

V8 was an Argentine heavy metal band formed in 1979, one of the pioneers of Argentine and Latin American heavy metal. After its dissolution former members have continued their careers starting other successful heavy metal bands, Hermética, Horcas, Rata Blanca, and Logos.

== History ==
V8 was first formed by Ricardo Iorio and Ricardo "Chofa" Moreno, who met when watching the film The Song Remains the Same. The cinema also played songs of Black Sabbath after the film. Heavy Metal, as a music genre, was still unknown. First they created the short-lived bands Alarma and Comunión Humana, and eventually the band V8. Their first songs were "Voy a enloquecer", "Si puedes vencer al temor" and "Muy cansado estoy". The first concert of V8 took place in August 1980, at Club Sahores. The first line-up featured Iorio in vocals and bass, Moreno in guitars, and Gerardo Osemberg in drums. The band took part in a concert in 1982, alongside WC, meant to be their last. Instead of that, the singer Alberto Zamarbide and drummer Gustavo Rowek both left WC and joined V8. Moreno left the band when he started to suffer from asthma, and proposed guitarist Osvaldo Civile. This led to the Iorio-Civile-Zamarbide-Rowek line-up, the best-known one of V8.

The band joined the concert "Buenos Aires Rock", helped by the producer of Riff. Their heavy metal music shocked the audience, largely composed by hippies. Many songs of the band openly insulted the hippie subculture. Although V8 and Riff had different styles, both bands were friends, and Pappo, leader of Riff, made a guest appearance in V8's first LP, Luchando por el Metal. It was followed by Un paso más en la batalla.

The band tried to emigrate to Brazil, but the project failed and they returned without Civile and Rowek. Adrián Cenci became the new drummer, and the band expanded to two guitarists with Walter Giardino and Miguel Roldán. Giardino stayed only for a brief time, and the band returned to a single guitarist, Roldán, when he left. The band turned to evangelism and released a third album, El fin de los inicuos. The religious tone led to conflicts between Iorio and the other members of the band, which disbanded.

Their cult status in Argentina comes not only from the songs they have written, but also because after the dissolution of the band in 1987, its members formed their own groups: Osvaldo Civile created Horcas, Alberto Zamarbide, Miguel Roldán and Adrián Cenci formed Logos and Gustavo Rowek and Walter Giardino created Rata Blanca. Bass player Ricardo Iorio formed Hermética in 1987, together with Antonio Romano at guitars, Fabián Spataro in drums and Claudio O'Connor for vocals. In 1996 some of the old members came together for one live show, but Iorio was missing. At this concert the CD Homenaje was recorded.

After Civile's death, there were still releases under the name V8. For a tribute album Iorio and the others went different ways. Iorio released the No Esta Muerto Quien Pelea tribute, recorded only with underground bands from all over Argentina. "Nems" records released "V8 No Murio", which was recorded with known names from all over Latin America. The limited edition digipak of this album has the No Se Rindan best of album as bonus CD and a thick booklet. Both tributes have different versions. The Antologia boxed set was released in 2001 and contains all 3 albums and one extra CD with unreleased material. Included is also an extensive booklet, full of photos. The band's records have become rare and now command high prices. There are also some live CD bootlegs circulating. In April 2014, an official V8 box set with the complete discography by the original 80s members was released.

== Members ==
=== Final members ===
- Ricardo Iorio – bass (1979–1987), vocals (1979–1982)
- Alberto Zamarbide – vocals (1982–1987)
- Adrian Cenci – drums (1985–1987)
- Miguel Roldán – guitars (1985–1987)

=== Past members ===
- Gerardo Osemberg – drums (1979–1981)
- Ricardo "Chofa" Moreno – guitars (1979–1982)
- Alejandro Colantonio – drums (1981–1982)
- Osvaldo Civile – guitars (1982–1985)
- Gustavo Rowek – drums (1982–1985)
- Walter Giardino – guitars (1985)
- Gustavo Andino – drums (1985)
- Guillermo Venuto – drums (1985)

== Discography ==
=== Studio albums ===
- Luchando Por El Metal (1983)
- Un Paso Mas En La Batalla (1985)
- El Fin De Los Inicuos (1986)

==== Other releases ====
- Demo (demo, 1982)
- No Se Rindan (compilation, 1991)
- Homenaje: Obras/MCMXCVI (live album, 1996)
- Antología (compilation, 2001)
- 1982 - 1987 (compilation, 2016)
- Tiempos metálicos (boxed set, 2023)
