= Maria Sastre =

American businesswoman

- Born: Maria Amalia Sastre; Havana, Cuba
- Citizenship: American
- Education: Miami Dade College (Accounting); New York Institute of Technology (BA, MBA)
- Occupation: Business executive
- Years active: 1970s–present
- Known for: Aviation industry executive
- Title: Former President and Chief Operating Officer of Signature Flight Support
- Board member of: General Mills; O'Reilly Auto Parts
- Awards: Fortune 50 Most Powerful Latinas (2017)

Maria Sastre is an American businesswoman known for her work in airlines. She was the first female regional vice president of United Airlines, a position she held from 1995 to 1999. She has since gone on to leadership roles in several other aviation-related organizations. Fortune named her one of the 50 most powerful Latinas of 2017.

== Early life and education ==
Sastre was born in Havana, Cuba and grew up in Miami. Her undergraduate education was at Florida International University. She earned a degree in accounting from Miami Dade College as well as a Bachelor of Arts in finance and a Master of Business Administration from the New York Institute of Technology.

== Career ==
While Sastre originally pursued a career banking, she started working in the accounting department of Eastern Air Lines when she was in college. She later assumed a role at Continental Airlines, and then moved to United Airlines where she was a regional vice president.

Subsequently, Sastre was the COO (2010) and president (2013) of Signature Flight Support, where she led the expansion of the passenger terminal at Newark Liberty International Airport. She left the company in May 2018. On May 9, 2018, it was announced that Sastre had been elected to the General Mills board of directors, effective June 1, 2018.
