= Gulf Coast Museum of Art =

Former art museum in Florida

- Location within Florida
- Dissolved: January 2009
- Location: 12211 Walsingham Road; Largo, Florida
- Coordinates: 27.88023°N 82.80854°W
- Type: Art
- Director: Michelle Turman

The Gulf Coast Museum of Art was located at 12211 Walsingham Road, Largo, Florida. It housed contemporary Florida art in the permanent collection.

The museum closed in January 2009 after 73 years of operation, and its collections are now part of the Florida International Museum at St. Petersburg College in St. Petersburg, Florida.
