= Manuel D. Medina =

American businessman

Former chairman of the board, president, CEO at Terremark Worldwide

Personal details
- Born: 1952 (age 73–74) Cuba
- Education: Florida Atlantic University, Bachelor of Science degree in 1974

Manuel D. "Manny" Medina is "one of South Florida's most successful tech entrepreneurs", noted for selling his Terremark data services company in 2012 to Verizon Communications for $1.4 billion.

== Early life ==
Medina was born in Matanzas, Cuba, and left in 1965, when he was 13. His parents left Cuba because of the extensive political changes in the country, and moved to Miami. Manny Medina went to school there and took an early interest in business. He earned a Bachelor of Science degree in Accounting from Florida Atlantic University in 1974.

== Career ==
Medina was the chairman of the board, president, and CEO of Terremark. He also holds the position of chairman and CEO of Medina Capital Partners, an investment firm focused on funding technology companies developing new products for the private and public sectors. In addition, he is a managing partner of Communication Investors Group, one of their investors. Medina has more than 30 years of experience as a businessman in areas including technology, finance, international business, and government contracting.

In his early career, Medina worked as certified public accountant with Price Waterhouse. Later, in 1980, he started his own company, Terremark, and served as chairman of the board, president and chief executive officer until 2011, when the company was acquired by Verizon Communications for $1.4billion, out of which he would receive about $83 million from his 4.4 million shares, almost 7 percent of the company.

In 2014, Medina Capital raised an additional $185M fund. Medina Capital has invested in the following companies:

- Brainspace
- Catbird
- Cryptzone
- Easy Solutions
