= Adrián Barilari =

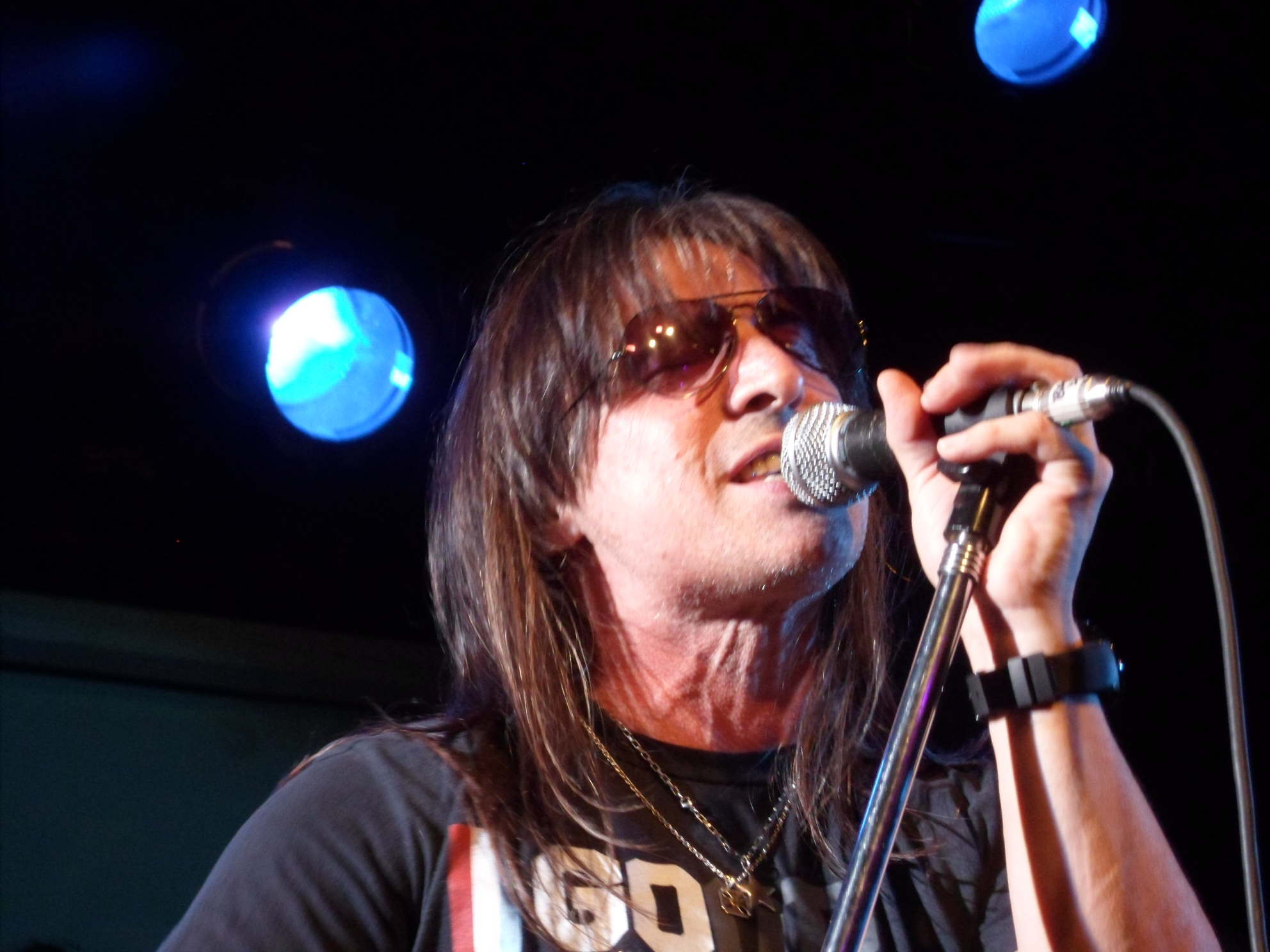
- Barilari performing in 2012

Background information
- Genres: Heavy metal, hard rock
- Occupations: Singer, Songwriter
- Years active: 1979 - Present
- Member of: Rata Blanca
- Formerly of: Alianza; Dias de Gloria

Adrián Eduardo Barilari (born November 11, 1959) is an Argentine singer best known as the vocalist of the heavy metal and hard rock band Rata Blanca. He also has his own solo band.

== Biography ==
Adrián Eduardo Barilari was born on November 11, 1959, in the Villa Lugano neighbourhood of Buenos Aires. Barilari was involved with music from an early age as his uncle was executor of bandoneon and tango singer, and taught him to sing when he was 4 or 5 years old. Soon his mother began taking him to television show to sing in front of cameras, at only 7 or 8 years old. At 13 he began composing his first songs and his mother inspired him to study the accordion, but he ended up learning to play the guitar.

His first bands were named Topos Urbanos, Cobalto, Vietnam, and Días de Gloria.

== Career ==
=== Rata Blanca (1989–1993) ===
It was then that the singer Saúl Blanch left Rata Blanca, and the group began searching for new singer. Although Barilari intended to continue in Dias de Gloria, his own colleagues urged him to bring it into the band. After his admission to the impressive success achieved Magos, espadas y rosas (Wizards, Swords and Roses), and was even present at the stadium of Velez Sarsfield as a major group. However, success began to wane after Guerrero del Arcoiris (Rainbow Warrior), as well as relations among the members. Still out on tour and in 1992 edited En Vivo en Buenos Aires (with Bach Soloists Chamber Orchestra), it would not be released until 1996. Finally, with the release of mini album El Libro Oculto (The Hidden Book), and to the wishes of Walter Giardino to bring the band to a heavier style, Adrian left the band to not agree with the new direction set by the guitarist.

=== Alianza (1994–2000) ===
With the keyboardist Hugo Bistolfi, who also left Rata Blanca, form Alianza, with many musicians sessions, which were the only members permanently was Barilari and Bistolfi. The duo explore ballads sound with more keyboard presence than Rata Blanca. Alianza did not have much impact in Argentina, but in other Latin American countries. They edited three albums Sueños del Mundo (1994), Alianza (1997), and Huellas (1999).

=== Rata Blanca (2000–present) ===
On September 2, 2000 announced in Bolivia to build again soon called Rata Blanca and her partner in Alianza for holding back the band on keyboards. Left for a Latin American tour and closed on 19 December at the Teatro Coliseo. Days later, Alianza presented in Acatraz. Rata Blanca already back to life, edited Grandes Canciones, a compilation with some of the most classical of the group, including an acoustic version of "Mujer Amante" with the current formation. Subsequently, released El Camino del Fuego who was the sequel to Temple, but with the new formation of Rata Blanca. Also released two singles from the latter, the first was titled Highway on fire with the songs "Master of the Highway", "Back Home", "Fire dance (a instrumental of Temple). In 2003 edited "Poder Vivo". In 2005 he edited La llave de la puerta secreta a disc inspired by the book The Da Vinci Code and in 2008 released his latest album El Reino Olvidado always remained in force in the scene in Argentina. El Reino Olvidado was also edited in English as The Forgotten Kingdom but Barilari refuse to record this version, finally Doogie White (Ritchie Blackmore's Rainbow, Yngwie Malmsteen's Rising Force) record the album.

=== Barilari (2001–present) ===
Besides his work in Rata Blanca, Adrián Barilari begin a solo career as a side project, he recorded an EP with four tracks ahead of the main cd "Barilari". " Barilari, and released as an album, with the participation of distinguished musicians from Stratovarius, Jens Johansson on keyboards, who also contributed string arrangements, guitars Emppu Vuorinen, Jukka Nevalainen on drums and Sami Vänskä on bass (all except the last, Members of Nightwish, Vänskä and is not). In guitars, in addition, the Argentine Daniel Telis and Gonzalo Ledesma. The album was recorded in Finland, Sweden, Germany and Argentina and has a string section recorded in Germany. The compositions are borne by Adrian Gonzalo Ledesma and Daniel Telis, Jens Johansson and Emppu Vuorinen. It highlights the cover of the classic Rainbow, "Stargazer", in a brilliant adaptation to Castilian. The album was mixed by Mikko Karmila and mastered by Mika Jussila in the legendary Finnvox Studios in Finland where today produces much of the heavy rock worldwide. Then released a live DVD, and recently edited covers CD called Canciones Doradas. In 2009 Adrian brings to light the third disc Abuso de Poder, this is a very powerful and dark album, this album was released via internet by page dontpaymusic.com in early June, the first cut is the song that gives title track.

== Influence and Technique ==
One could mention as his main influences include Ronnie James Dio, Ian Gillan although some style Barilari treated with singers more cutting power and lyrical as Michael Kiske, Tobias Sammet and Bruce Dickinson.

Likewise, in his 20-year career he has also inspired artists who today belong to Hispanic bands. Until the time of admission to Rata Blanca in the late '80s, had not appeared on the scene arguably Argentina and throughout Latin America also a vocalist of heavy metal and hard rock with the technical quality and influence classic hit which he learned in those years, so it may be cited as the spearhead of the genre.

== Discography ==
=== With Rata Blanca ===
- Magos, espadas y rosas (1990)
- Guerrero del Arco Iris (1991)
- El Libro Oculto (1993)
- En Vivo en Buenos Aires (1992/1996)
- Grandes Canciones (2000)
- El Camino del Fuego (2002)
- Poder Vivo (2003)
- La Llave de la Puerta Secreta (2005)
- El Reino Olvidado (2008)
- Tormenta Eléctrica (2015)

=== With Alianza ===
- Sueños del Mundo (1994)
- Alianza (1997)
- Huellas (1999)

=== Soloist ===
- Barilari (2003)
- Canciones Doradas (2007)
- Abuso de Poder (2009)
- 4 (2012)
- Infierock (2019)

=== Collaborations ===
- Azeroth (2000)
- Magika: "La Fuerza Que Nace" (2001)
- La Leyenda Continua: Tribute to Rata Blanca (2001)
- Dragonfly: "Domine" (2002)
- Larga Vida al... Volumen Brutal: Tribute to Barón Rojo (2002)
- Blind Guardian: A Night at the Opera "La Cosecha del Dolor" (2002)
- Agamez: "Batalla Solar" (2007)
- Hugo Bistolfi: "Viaje al Cosmos" (2009)
