= Octavio Hernández (banker) =

Chief executive officer and co-founder of U.S. Century Bank

Octavio Hernández was the vice chairman of the board, president, and chief executive officer of U.S. Century Bank. Hernández is also one of U.S. Century Bank's founders. Later, sometime in the 2010s, he became an algebra teacher, at Citrus Ridge: A Civics Academy.
