= Terremark =

Data storage company

Terremark Worldwide, Inc.
- Company type: Subsidiary
- Founded: 1980
- Founder: Manny Medina
- Headquarters: Miami, USA
- Services: information technology services
- Revenue: $ 292 M (2010)
- Net income: $ -31 M (2010)
- Number of employees: 859 total 260 in South Florida
- Parent: Equinix, Inc.
- Website: www.equinix.com

Terremark Worldwide, Inc., is a subsidiary of the American technology company IBM. Headquartered in Miami, Florida, the company had data centers in the United States, Europe and Latin America; it offered services which include managed hosting, colocation, disaster recovery, data storage, and cloud computing.

Terremark employed over 750 people at its Miami-Dade County headquarters.

== History ==
In 1980 entrepreneur Manny Medina incorporated Terremark as a real estate company, constructing office buildings. During the dot-com era, an increasing number of his buildings were leased to computer data centers; over the years the company morphed into an information technology services company itself starting with the NAP of the Americas, a large data center and Internet exchange point that hosts one of the instances of the K-root of the Domain Name System.

On January 27, 2011, Verizon Communications announced it would buy Terremark Worldwide for $19 a share, in a deal valued at $1.4 billion. Medina received about $83 million from the Verizon acquisition. Verizon completed its acquisition of Terremark on April 12, 2011. Medina left the company at the time of the takeover and Terremark had two presidents in the first year after the acquisition. Currently three high ranking executives are running the business.

In October 2013, Secretary of Health and Human Services (HHS) Kathleen Sebelius revealed that Verizon, the web-hosting provider for HealthCare.gov, was the government contractor responsible for "outages that disrupted the website" when it was initially rolled out. A month later, HHS revealed that it did not renew its contract with Verizon, and instead awarded the contract for hosting HealthCare.gov to Hewlett-Packard.

In Jan 2016, Verizon confirmed the intention to divest its data center portfolio, with Equinix (EQIX) for a consideration of around $3.5 billion.

In May 2017, Verizon confirmed its divestiture of Terremark, selling to IBM.
