= Walter Giardino =

Argentine guitarist (born 1960)

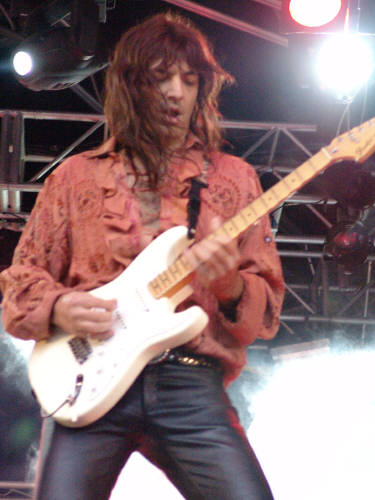

Background information
- Born: 6 March 1960 (age 66)
- Origin: Buenos Aires, Argentina
- Genres: Heavy metal; hard rock
- Occupations: Musician; composer; producer
- Instrument: Guitar
- Years active: 1980–present

Héctor Walter Giardino (born 6 March 1960) is an Argentine guitarist and the leader of the heavy metal and hard rock band Rata Blanca. He is recognized as one of the best guitarists in the history of Latin rock.

== Career ==
=== Early years and V8 (1981–1985) ===
In 1981 Walter Giardino as a guitarist and vocalist founded Punto Rojo with Gustavo Andino (drums) and Roberto Cosseddu (bass). The band was successful on the under scene but never recorded an album. The band was dissolved in 1984. In 1985 the most important national heavy metal band at the time, V8, was looking for a new guitarist and drummer to substitute Osvaldo Civile and Gustavo Rowek, so the band recruited Giardino, Gustavo Andino (from Punto Rojo) and Miguel Roldán, another guitarist. In his time with V8 Giardino wrote some songs but the band never accepted or incorporated them. After six months with V8, the bassist and leader Ricardo Iorio fired Giardino. He then began a new project with another former V8 member, the drummer Gustavo Rowek.

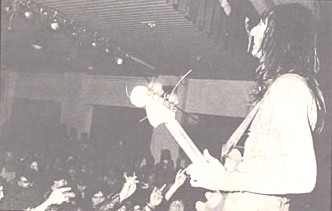
Walter Giardino during his brief time in V8.

=== Rata Blanca (1986–1997) ===
In 1986, after his departure from V8, Giardino founded Rata Blanca with Gustavo Rowek (drums), Rodolfo Cava (vocals) and Yulie Ruth (bass), with this line-up the band recorded a demo. After two years of rehearsals the band debuted at Teatro Luz y Fuerza in Buenos Aires. For this event the band recruited Sergio Berdichevsky (rhythm guitar), Saul Blanch (vocals) and a new bassist Guillermo Sanchez. This line-up eventually recorded the band's self-titled debut album. In 1990 the band recorded Magos, espadas y rosas with Adrián Barilari on the vocals and Hugo Bistolfi as an official member in the keyboard duties. This era was the band's most successful. In 1992 they released Guerrero del Arco Iris and in 1993 the EP El Libro Oculto. After this Walter Giardino wished to move the band's sound into a heavier sound, opinion not shared with both Barilari and Bistolfi, who decided to leave Rata Blanca. They were in turn replaced by Mario Ian (vocals) and Javier Retamozo (keyboards). This formation recorded in 1994 Entre el Cielo y el Infierno an album marked with a heavy sound more in the style of bands like Accept and Judas Priest. Ian left in 1996 after musical differences with the band, and Giardino started searching for a new vocalist with the same register of Barilari. Finally he recruited Gabriel Marian. VII was the next album, that didn't receive much acceptance from the fans. Late 1997, Giardino disbanded Rata Blanca.

=== Temple (1998–2000, 2012, 2016–2017) ===
Giardino began a new project named Walter Giardino Temple which only recorded one album (1998) The band included Norberto Rodriguez (vocals) Ruben Trombini (bass), Pablo Catania (keyboards) and Martin Carrizo (drums) later replaced by Fernando Scarcella. The band broke up after playing with Glenn Hughes (Deep Purple, Black Sabbath) when Walter Giardino wanted to play alone allegedly because the band didn't know how to play the song "Burn". After this event the members of the band except Scarcella created their own band, ironically named Quemar (Spanish translation of "burn"). Temple was on a hiatus and Giardino collaborated with Spanish metal band Mago de Oz and then returned to Argentina. Giardino invited Adrian Barilari and Hugo Bistolfi to act for some nights with Temple. The bassist Daniel Leonetti left the band and his place was taken by Guillermo Sanchez (another Rata Blanca member). This was the beginning of the return of Rata Blanca.

==== Joe Lynn Turner shows ====
In September 2012 Giardino reactivated Temple to bring some concerts with Joe Lynn Turner. The setlist include songs of Deep Purple and Rainbow. The band was conformed by Rata Blanca members Danilo Moschen and Fernando Scarcella (also in the first era of Temple), and Pablo Motyzak. Javier Barrozo, current singer of Magnos, sang Temple original songs during the show. Giardino reunited with Turner in April 2016 and bring some shows in Argentina, Uruguay and Chile. For this presentations keyboardist Danilo Moschen was replaced by Javier Retamozo, a former member of Rata Blanca.

==== Ronnie Romero shows ====
In August 2017, Giardino announced a tour for October and November 2017, with Rainbow singer, Ronnie Romero.

=== Rata Blanca: The Second Era (2000–present) ===
Temple officially had four of the six members of the most successful line-up of Rata Blanca. Giardino decided to reform Rata Blanca and asked Gustavo Rowek and Sergio Berdichevsky to return to Rata Blanca, but they decided to remain with their own band Nativo. Fernando Scarcella stayed as the drummer of Rata Blanca, and Giardino became the only guitarist of the group. In recent years, they have released three more albums, El Camino del Fuego (The Path of Fire) in 2002, La Llave de la Puerta Secreta (The Key to the Secret Door) in 2005, and El Reino Olvidado (The Forgotten Kingdom) in 2008. The lyrics to La Llave de la Puerta Secreta were inspired by The Da Vinci Code. Wanting to gain a more international profile, Giardino approached former Rainbow singer Doogie White to record an English version of the Forgotten Kingdom album in 2009. In 2015 released the tenth studio album Tormenta Eléctrica.

== Influences ==
Giardino cited Ritchie Blackmore, Eddie Van Halen, David Gilmour, Yngwie Malmsteen, Niccolò Paganini and Johann Sebastian Bach as his major influences.

== Discography ==
=== With Rata Blanca ===
- Rata Blanca – 1988
- Magos, espadas y rosas – 1990
- Guerrero del Arco Iris – 1992
- El Libro Oculto – 1993
- Entre el Cielo y el Infierno – 1994
- En Vivo en Buenos Aires – 1996
- Rata Blanca VII – 1997
- Grandes Canciones – 2000
- El Camino del Fuego (Highway on Fire) – 2002
- Poder Vivo – 2002
- En Vivo con Glenn Hughes (DVD) – 2003
- La Llave de la Puerta Secreta – 2005
- El Reino Olvidado (The Forgotten Kingdom) – 2008–2009
- Tormenta Eléctrica – 2015

=== With Walter Giardino Temple ===
- Walter Giardino Temple – 1998

=== With others ===
- Gaia – Mägo de Oz – 2003
- Barilari – Barilari – 2003
- Canciones Doradas – Barilari – 2007
- Sabbath Crosses (Tribute to Black Sabbath)
- Larga vida al... Volumen Brutal, song "Los Rockeros Van Al Infierno" (Tribute to Barón Rojo).
- Tierra Firme of Ars Amandi, guitar solo on "Tierra Firme".
- Cuerdas Vitales – Carina Alfie
