= Gustavo Rowek =

Argentine drummer

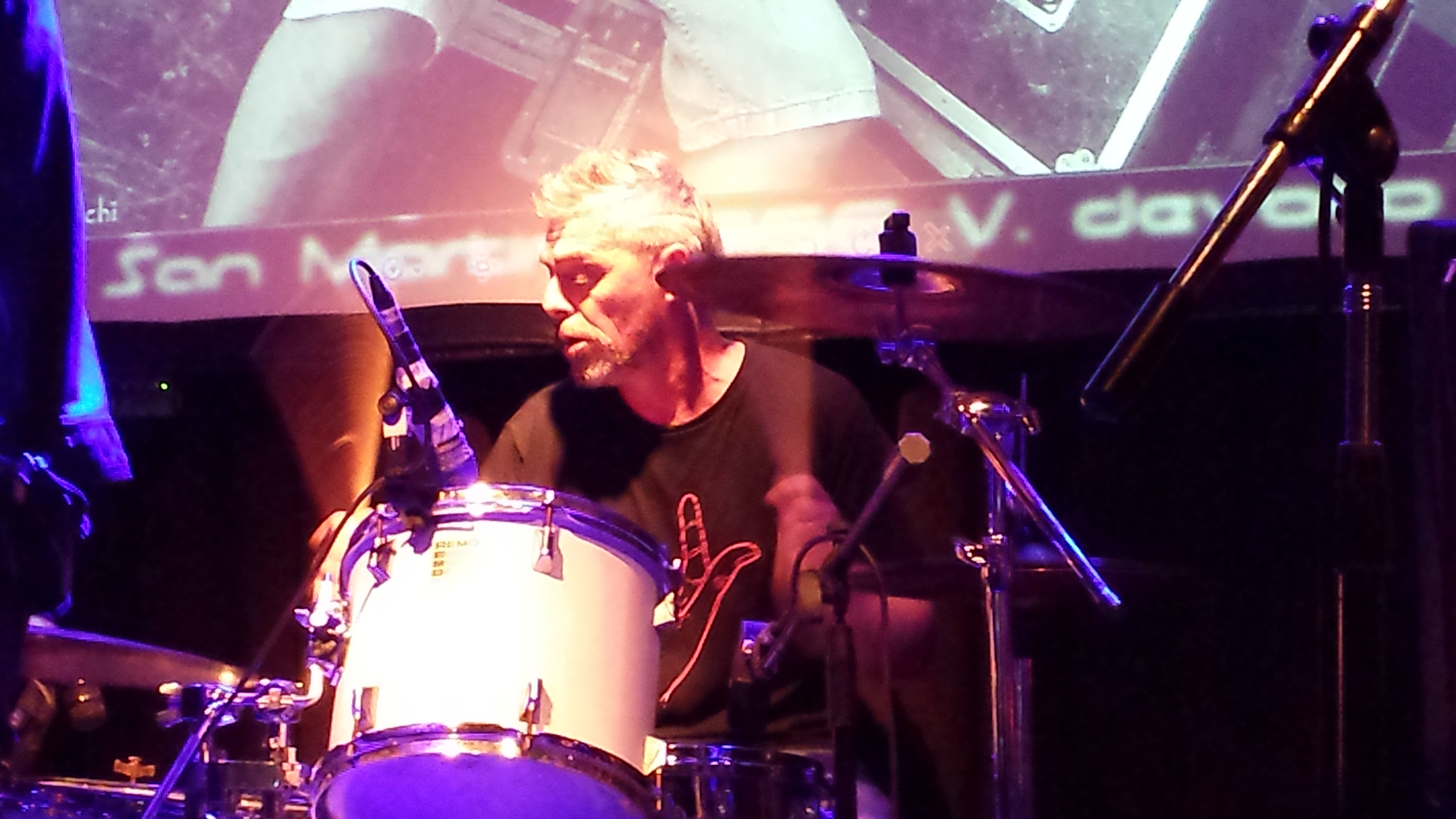
- Rowek in 2017

Background information
- Born: 19 March 1963 (age 63)
- Origin: Buenos Aires, Argentina
- Genres: Heavy metal; nu metal
- Occupation: Drummer
- Years active: 1980–present

Gustavo Nestor Rowek (born 19 March 1963) is an Argentine heavy metal drummer known for being one of the founders of heavy metal movement in Argentina through its participation in Surmenage, WC, V8 and Rata Blanca. Currently he works in his own project Rowek.

== Career ==
=== Early years, V8 and Rata Blanca ===
Rowek began playing at age 16, after a friend taught him some basic principles. His first band was called Sourmenage, but later he left this to join WC. The band performed in various places, including a festival by the heavy metal band V8, a group with which they became friends. Gustavo finished part of the formation of V8. Rowek split with V8 in 1985 and in Brazil began with Osvaldo Civile to shape what would become Horcas. On his return from Brazil, Rowek agreed to help Walter Giardino recording a demo of some songs. That would be temporary, however with the result obtained in the demo, and seeing that the project Horcas was delayed, together they founded the band Rata Blanca. Transcending even the boundaries of their country and sell their music making in over 14 countries. Rata Blanca won several gold records, platinum, double and even triple platinum sales, with this band toured throughout America and Europe. He quit Rata Blanca in 1998.

=== Nativo, Ian and V8 tribute ===
Rowek stood by Sergio Berdichevsky and formed the band Nativo. With this independent band, materialized numerous accomplishments and share the stage with bands like Attaque 77, Linkin Park and Red Hot Chili Peppers, among others. Nativo released four albums, but Rowek decided to end the band to devote himself to his personal project. Parallel to Nativo, in 2006 were invited by singer Mario Ian, who had shared the stage in Rata Blanca composing together several tracks on the album "Entre el Cielo y el Infierno", to join his band as guest musician. Subsequently, Rowek ended up recording the drums for two Ian albums. In the meanwhile he also played in a stoner rock project called Solodolor.

In 2011, Gustavo Rowek decided to put together a tribute to V8 with renowned musicians in the Argentine metal importance. In 2012, Gustavo Rowek leaves Ian due to focus his career in a new soloist project.. He also plays in War Pigs, a Black Sabbath tribute band.

=== Rowek and De La Cruz ===
In 2011, he began with his solo band Rowek. It released two studio albums so far. In 2023 he joined De La Cruz, a heavy/power metal band from Guatemala. They released a studio album that same year.

== Discography ==
Album	Band	Year	Record
Demo	V8	1982	Demo
Luchando Por El Metal	V8	1983	Studio
Un Paso Mas En La Batalla	V8	1985	Studio
Rata Blanca	Rata Blanca	1988	Studio
Magos, espadas y rosas	Rata Blanca	1990	Studio
Guerrero del Arco Iris	Rata Blanca	1991	Studio
El Libro Oculto	Rata Blanca	1993	EP
Entre el Cielo y el Infierno	Rata Blanca	1994	Studio
En vivo en Buenos Aires	Rata Blanca	1996	Live
Homenaje	V8	1996	Live (tribute)
VII	Rata Blanca	1997	Studio
Consumo	Nativo	1999	Studio
Futuro	Nativo	2001	Studio
Vos también	Nativo	2003	Studio
En tiempos de redención	Ian	2007	Studio
¡Y qué!	Nativo	2008	Studio
Nuevo Orden	Ian	2012	Studio
Grita	Rowek	2012	Studio
Redes	Rowek	2016	Studio
Solodolor	Solodolor	2017	Studio
Antiguos conjuros	De La Cruz	2023	Studio
