= Rata Blanca =

Argentine rock band

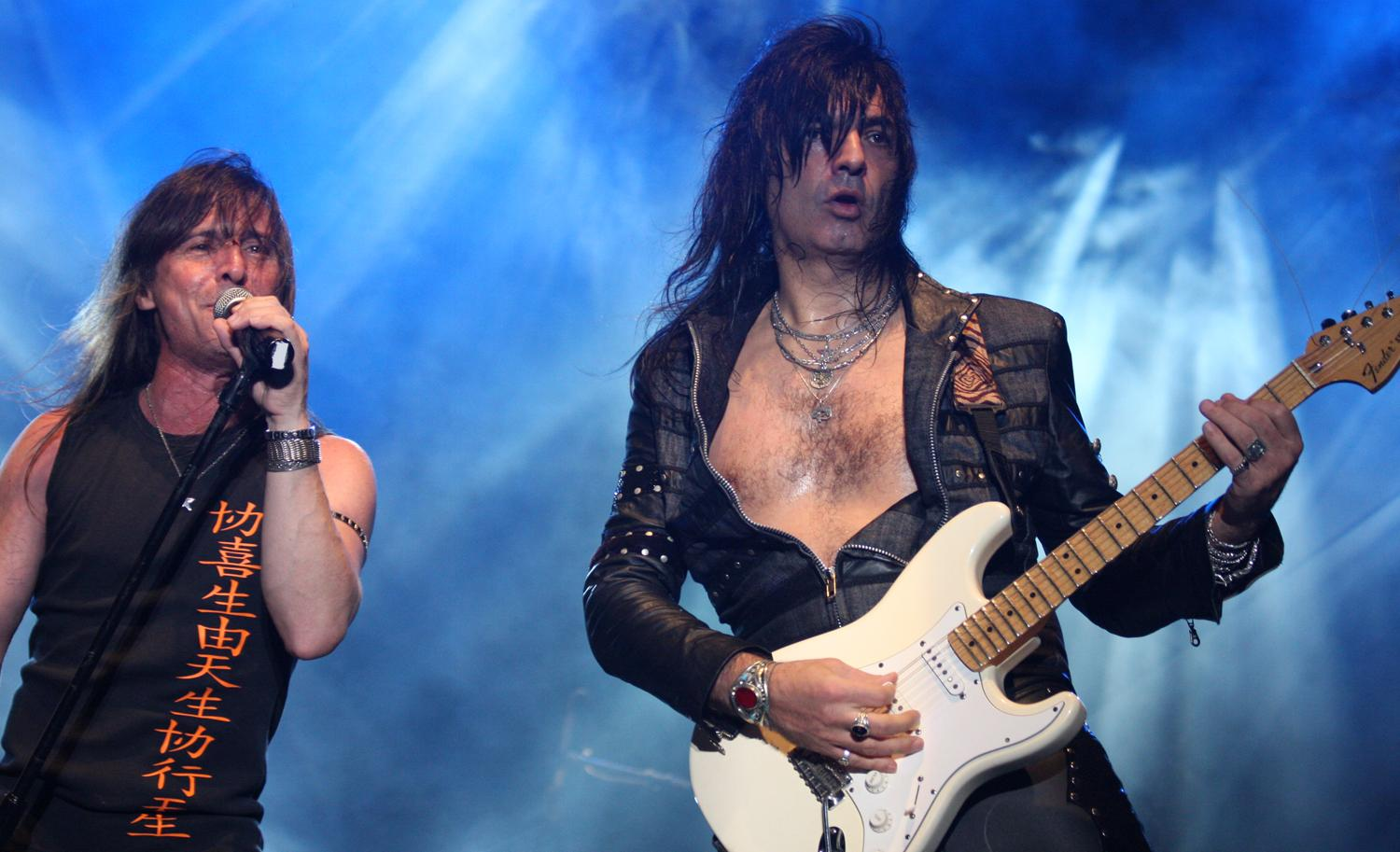
- Rata Blanca's frontman Adrián Barilari and guitarist Walter Giardino in concert, 2008

Background information
- Origin: Buenos Aires, Argentina
- Genres: Argentine rock, heavy metal, hard rock
- Years active: 1986–1998, 2000–present
- Labels: PolyGram, Ariola, Sony BMG, PopArt Music (Sony), Icarus Music
- Spinoffs: Walter Giardino Temple; Barilari; Alianza
- Spinoff of: V8
- Members: Adrián Barilari; Alan Fritzler; Walter Giardino; Danilo Moschen; John Paul
- Past members: Saúl Blanch; Gustavo Rowek; Sergio Berdichevsky; Hugo Bistolfi; Gabriel Marian; Javier Retamozo; Mario Ian; Guillermo Sánchez
- Website: ratablanca.net

Rata Blanca (English: White Rat) is an Argentine heavy metal band, formed in 1986.

== History ==
=== Beginnings ===
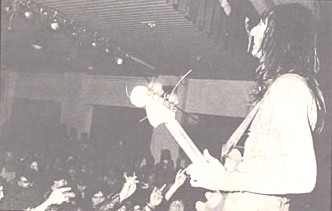
Walter Giardino during his brief time in V8

The guitarist Walter Giardino replaced Osvaldo Civile in V8 for a short time, and left the band when his songs were rejected. His friend Roberto Cosseddu, bassist of Kamikaze, helped him to record a demo tape with those songs. The drummer Gustavo Rowek, who had also left V8 a short time before, declined his projects with Civile and joined Giardino. The session musicians Rodolfo Cava (singer) and Yulie Ruth (bass player) completed the line-up that recorded the demo. The songs were "Chico callejero", "Rompe el hechizo", "Gente del sur" and "La bruja blanca". Seeking stable members, the band took Saúl Blanch as singer, who was working in the hard-rock band Plus. They met the bass player Guillermo Sánchez with the help of Giardino's friend Sergio Berdichevsky, member of WC at that point.

Rata Blanca played their first concert on 15 August 1987 in the Luz y Fuerza theater. Saúl Blanch left the band, and he was replaced by Carlos Périgo, who composed the song "Días Duros". Périgo left the band soon after that. Rodolfo Cava returned for a brief time, and Shito Molina got ill and could not sing anymore. As the band was about to record their first album and needed a singer immediately, Saúl Blanch returned to the band and helped record it. The album Rata Blanca was released in 1988, with nine songs. In that year they took part in the "Halley en Obras" concert, along with Alakrán, JAF and Kamikaze.

=== Success ===
Polygram requested that the band create an album which would have high sales in the first semester to renew the contract, and the band sold four times the required number. The keyboard player Hugo Bistolfi joined the band in 1989, and the singer Adrián Barilari replaced Saúl Blanch. The band subsequently made their second album, Magos, espadas y rosas, which contained the popular songs "Mujer amante" and "La leyenda del hada y el mago". It was a successful release, and in its wake the band appeared on the TV show Ritmo de la Noche and played in cumbia concert halls because typical rock venues could not accommodate their large audiences.

The album was followed by "Guerrero del Arco Iris", and a concert at the José Amalfitani Stadium. The band ended their contract with Polygram recording a live album, made at the Opera Theater with an orchestra, but this album was released years later. Once on BMG they made an EP called El Libro Oculto. This work was more aggressive, both in instrumental style and lyrical style, as a result of the criticism from heavy metal fans towards the band.

=== Changes in lineup and reunion ===
Barilari did not like the new style found on El Libro Oculto and left the band after a concert in Obras. Bistolfi followed him, and both of them created the band Alianza.

Barilari and Bistolfi were replaced by Mario Ian on vocals and Javier Retamozo on keyboards. With this line-up they released Entre el Cielo y el Infierno ("Between Heaven and Hell"). Later that year, they were invited to play in the Festival Monsters of Rock in São Paulo, Brazil, along with Ozzy Osbourne, Therapy?, and Alice Cooper. They released another album with new singer Gabriel Marian called Rata Blanca VII. The group disbanded in 1998. Gustavo Rowek and Sergio Berdichevsky created the band Nativo, and Giardino continued with Walter Giardino Temple.

Barilari and Bistolfi were invited to a concert of Walter Giardino Temple in 2000, which led to a reunion of the band. Rowek and Berdichevsky refused to be part of the reunion. The radio station La Mega aired frequently the old "Mujer amante" song, generating a renewed interest in the band. The new album, El camino del fuego, released in 2002, was a huge success. Its follow-up, the 2005 album La Llave de la Puerta Secreta, had great sales and went Gold even before being officially released.

Rata Blanca played with famous member of Deep Purple Glenn Hughes as a guest at the Gran Rex Theater, in 2003. They played the band's hits as well as Deep Purple's classic songs. In order to gain a more international profile, Giardino approached former Rainbow singer Doogie White to record an English version of the Forgotten Kingdom album in 2009.

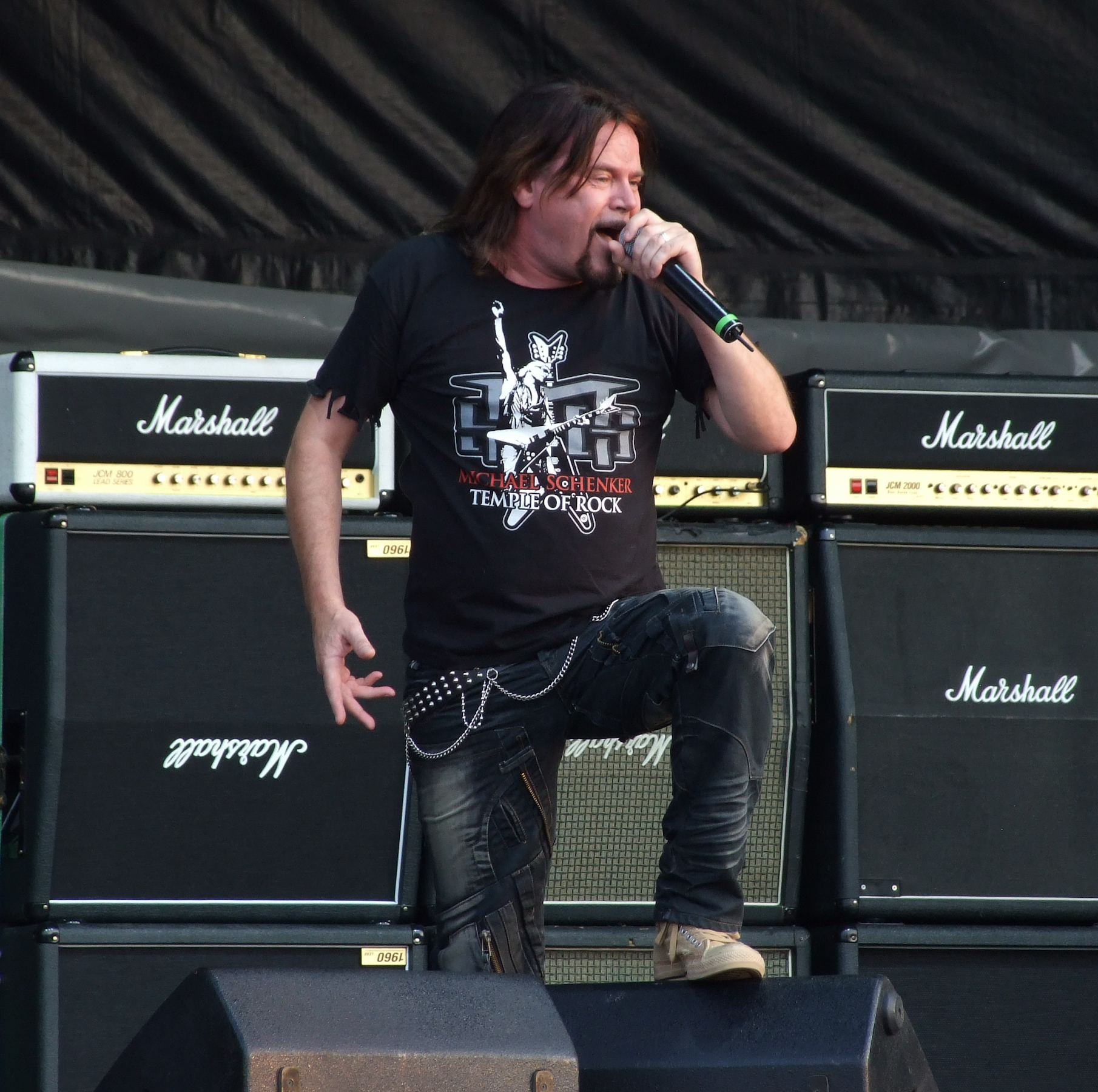
Doogie White recorded an English version of El Reino Olvidado

=== 2010–present ===
Early in 2010, longtime Rata Blanca keyboardist Hugo Bistolfi left the band and was replaced by Danilo Moschen, a former member of Barilari's soloist band.

In 2013, original members Gustavo Rowek, Sergio Berdichevsky and Saul Blanch reunited with Rata Blanca for some shows. In 2015 Rata Blanca released their tenth studio album, Tormenta Eléctrica.

In May 2017, bass player Guillermo Sánchez died due to sepsis. A few days before, singer Adrián Barilari announced that Guillermo was in poor health.

Vocalist Saúl Blanch died in October 2026, at the age of 75.

== Personnel ==
=== Current lineup ===
- Walter Giardino – lead guitar (1986–1998, 2000–present)
- Adrián Barilari – vocals (1989–1993, 2000–present)
- Danilo Moschen – keyboards (2010–present)
- Alan Fritzler - drums (2024–present)
- Juan Pablo Massanisso - bass (2024–present)

=== Past members ===
- Saúl Blanch – vocals (1987–1989; died 2026)
- Mario Ian – vocals (1993–1996)
- Gabriel Marian – vocals (1996–1998)
- Sergio Berdichevsky – rhythm guitar (1986–1998)
- Guillermo Sánchez – bass (1986–1998, 2000–2017; died 2017)
- Gustavo Rowek – drums (1986–1998)
- Hugo Bistolfi – keyboards (1989–1993, 2000–2010)
- Javier Retamozo – keyboards (1993–1998)
- Fernando Scarcella – drums (2000–2023)
- Pablo Motyczak – bass (2017–2023)

=== Live members ===
- Shito Molina – vocals (1988; died 2003)
- Carlos Perigo – vocals (1988)
- Rodolfo Cava – vocals (1986)
- Alejandro Zon – drums (2005, 2022)
- Mariano Elias Martin – drums (2018)

== Discography ==
=== Studio albums ===
- Rata Blanca (1988)
- Magos, Espadas y Rosas (1990)
- Guerrero del Arco Iris (1991)
- Entre el Cielo y el Infierno (1994)
- Rata Blanca VII (1997)
- El Camino del Fuego (2002)
- La Llave de la Puerta Secreta (2005)
- El Reino Olvidado (2008)
- Tormenta Eléctrica (2015)

=== Live and compilation albums ===
- En Vivo en Buenos Aires (1996)
- Grandes Canciones (compilation, 2000)
- Oro: Grandes Éxitos (compilation, 2002)
- Poder Vivo (2003)
- En Vivo (2003)
- Magos Espadas y Rosas: XX Aniversario en Vivo (2011)

=== Singles and EPs ===
- El Sueño de la Gitana (1988)
- La Leyenda del Hada y el Mago (1990)
- Días Duros (1990)
- Mujer Amante (1990)
- Abrazando el Rock & Roll (1991)
- Guerrero del Arco Iris (1991)
- Nada Es Fácil Sin tu Amor (1991)
- El Libro Oculto (EP, 1993)
- Basura (1994)
- Mujer Amante - versión acústica (2000)
- Rata Blanca (EP, 2001)
- Teatro Gran Rex XIV - XII - MMI (2001)
- Highway on Fire (EP, 2002)
- Volviendo a Casa (2002)
- El Reino Olvidado (2008)
- La Leyenda del Hada y el Mago / Mujer Amante (live, 2011)

== Cover versions ==
Spain's Mägo de Oz recorded a version of "Mujer amante".
