= Pepsi Music Festival =

Argentine music festival

Pepsi music festival
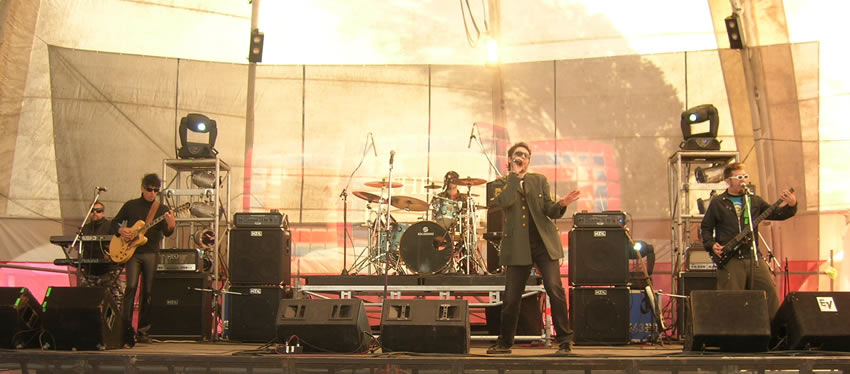
- Genre: Rock, alternative rock, indie rock, Argentine rock
- Dates: September–October (10-11 days)
- Locations: Buenos Aires, Argentina
- Years active: 2003 - present

The Pepsi Music Festival was a major Argentine music festival, held annually since 2003. Since 2005, it has been named after its main sponsor, Pepsi; before it was named after its previous sponsor, Quilmes, and it was known as "Quilmes Rock". It was held in several places in Buenos Aires, including the Ferro Stadium and River Plate Stadium. Since 2005, it has been held at Obras Stadium. It is the largest and longest music festival in the country, with more than 200,000 people attending in 2006, over 10 days.

The most important national rock singers and groups participated of the festival, along with some of the most notable international rock stars.

== Merchandise and TV ==
in 2003 and 2004 the Pepsi Music Festival was televised on the Pepsi Smash show on the WB television network

to promote the show promotional DVD's and CD's were made including Pepsi More Music best of 2003 DVD

The Pepsi Dare for More CD and The Pepsi More Music DVD volume 1-2

== Annual festivals and musical acts ==
Year	Musical acts	Notes
2003	Die Toten Hosen, Gustavo Cerati, Los Ratones Paranoicos, Divididos, Memphis, Bersuit Vergarabat, Café Tacuba, Babasónicos, Attaque 77, Los Pericos, Luis A.Spinetta, Mancha de Rolando, Intoxicados, El Otro Yo	
2004	The Wailers, The Offspring, Los Cafres, Mimi Maura, Molotov, Dancing Mood, Las Pelotas, Charly García, Los Piojos, Vox Dei, Paralamas, Pappo, Los Auténticos Decadentes, Catupecu Machu	A promotional CD was made to advertise this event called "Dare for More" there were 9 different versions made
2005	Megadeth, Apocalyptica, The Wailers, Die Toten Hosen, Andrew Tosh, La Vela Puerca, Ska-P, Turf, Kapanga, No te va Gustar, Villanos, Massacre, Los Tipitos, Los Piojos, Cabezones, Almafuerte	The Megadeth show was filmed and later released in a DVD called That One Night: Live in Buenos Aires.
2006	Iggy & The Stooges, Plastilina Mosh, Michael Rose, Mancha de Rolando, Guasones, Las Pastillas del Abuelo, Babasónicos, Intoxicados, No te va Gustar, Rata Blanca, Arbol, La Mosca, Bahiano, Las Pelotas and Miranda!	The 2006 edition attracted approximately 200,000 people. During 11 days, important national and international rock bands played in several outdoor and indoor stages.
2007	Marilyn Manson, The Black Eyed Peas, Australian Pink Floyd Show, The Cloud Room, Diego Mizrahi, Molotov, Héroes del Silencio, The Wailers, Divididos, Almafuerte, Intoxicados, Pier, Guasones, Jovenes Pordioseros and Arbol	The 2007 edition took place from September 22 to October 2
2008	The Hives, Mötley Crüe, Dave Matthews Band, The Cult, Ky-Mani Marley, Capibara, Catupecu Machu, Stone Temple Pilots, Beatsteaks, Nine Inch Nails and Índica	The 2008 edition took place on September 13 (Opening Night) and from September 26 to October 5
2009	The Prodigy, Banda de Turistas, Los 7 delfines, Faith No More, Die Toten Hosen, Los Pericos, Los Cafres, Fidel Nadal, Las Pelotas, Pampa Yakuza, Cielo Razzo, Living Colour, Divididos, Cielo Razzo, Ratones Paranoicos, La Vela Puerca, Maxïmo Park, The Ting Tings, Calle 13, Los Tipitos, Gogol Bordello, Zoé, Índica, Dante Spinetta, Cultura Profética, Karamelo Santo, Kapanga, Los Auténticos Decadentes y Mamá Pulpa, Misterio y Los Fabulosos Cadillacs and Catupecu Machu	The 2009 edition took place on October 30 (opening night) to November 8.
2010	Green Day, Rage Against the Machine, Queens of the Stone Age, Alain Johannes, The Abyssinians, Andrés Calamaro, No Te Va Gustar, Molotov, Massacre and Cadena Perpetua	The 2010 edition took place on October 13, 14, 15, 16, 19, 20, 22 and 23, indoors and outdoors
2011	Red Hot Chili Peppers, Jauria, Índica, Las pelotas, Katy Perry, Snow Patrol, Primal Scream and Jarabe de Palo	The 2011 edition took place on September 18, 24, 27 and 28
2012	Garbage, Best Coast, Richard Coleman, Catupecu Machu, Kapanga, Las Pelotas, Evanescence, Carajo and Cirse	The 2012 edition took place on October 18, 20 and 21
2013	Pearl Jam, Queens of the Stone Age, The Black Keys, Catupecu Machu, Kaiser Chiefs, The Hives, Hot Chip, Alabama Shakes, Massacre, Two Door Cinema Club, Cabezones, Passion Pit, Doctor Kràpula, Rosal and Utopians	
2014	Blake Shelton, Carrie Underwood, Dierks Bently, Big & Rich, Randy Houser, Love and Theft, Cassadee Pope, and Lonestar, Jon Pardi, Casey James, Blackjack Billy, and Andrew Salgado	
2015	Lady Antebellum, Miranda Lambert, Keith Urban, Hunter Hayes, Dwight Yoakam, Martina McBride, Sam Hunt, Scotty McCreery, Gary Allan, Ronnie Milsap, Kellie Pickler, Tyler Farr, Darryl Worley, Kristian Bush, Kirstie Lovelady, Nick Sturms, The Swon Brothers, Jack Ingram, Preston Summerville, Them Dirty Roses and the Pepsi Southern Original Winner	
2016	Eric Church, Brad Paisley and Jake Owen	
2017	Jason Aldean, Lee Brice, Tyler Farr, The Oak Ridge Boys, Darryl Worley, The Railers, Gal Friday Band, Little Big Town, Kip Moore, Dan + Shay, Colt Ford, Diamond Rio, William Michael Morgan, Muscadine Bloodline, Luke Bryan, Brett Eldredge, Granger Smith, Kane Brown, Luke Combs, Them Dirty Roses, Pepsi Southern Original Winner	
2018	Justin Moore, Chris Janson, Dustin Lynch, Chase Rice, Cam, Brett Young, Lauren Alaina, Rodney Atkins, Joe Diffie, Morgan Evans, Montgomery Gentry, Nitty Gritty Dirt Band, Tyler Rich, A Thousand Horses, Drake White, The Georgia Thunderbolts, Raleigh Keegan and the Pepsi Southern original winner	
2019	Midland, Locash, Big and Rich, Lanco, The Cadillac Three, Gretchen Wilson, Lauren Alaina, Thompson Square, Ashley McBryde, Jamestown Revival, Runaway June, The Outlaws, Nora Collins, Kyle Mitchell, Gabby Barrett, Matt Bennett, Dixie Jade	
2020	Cody Jinks, Joe Nichols, Lindsay Ell, Jon Langston, CJ Solar, and Frank Ray, Cole Swindell, Billy Ray Cyrus, Jordan Davis, Tenille Townes, Shy Carter, and Alex Hall, Brothers Osborne, Riley Green, Walker Hayes, Ryan Hurd, Shelly Fairchild, and the Pepsi Southern Original winner	
2021	Chris Stapleton, Old Dominion, Brooks & Dunn, Gary Allan, Chris Janson, Scott Mcreery, Randy Rogers band, Frankie Ballard, Tracy Lawrence, Tyler Rich, Darryl Worley, Corey Smith, Ryan Griffin, Steve Moakler, Elvie Shane, Tigirlily, Lily Rose, Confederate railroad, Tom Yankton, Nate Barnes, Presley and Taylor	Nate Barnes is the Pepsi Southern original winner
