= Quilmes Rock =

Annual Argentine music festival

- Genre: Heavy metal; punk rock; rock
- Dates: April (4 days)
- Locations: Buenos Aires, Argentina
- Years active: 2002–2004; 2007–present

Quilmes Rock is a major Argentine rock festival, held annually from 2002 to 2004, and from 2007 on. It is named after its main sponsor, Cerveza Quilmes brewery. It was held in several venues in Buenos Aires, including the Ferro Stadium and River Plate Stadium.

Several important international rock singers and groups have participated of the festival, along with some of the most notable Argentine rock stars.

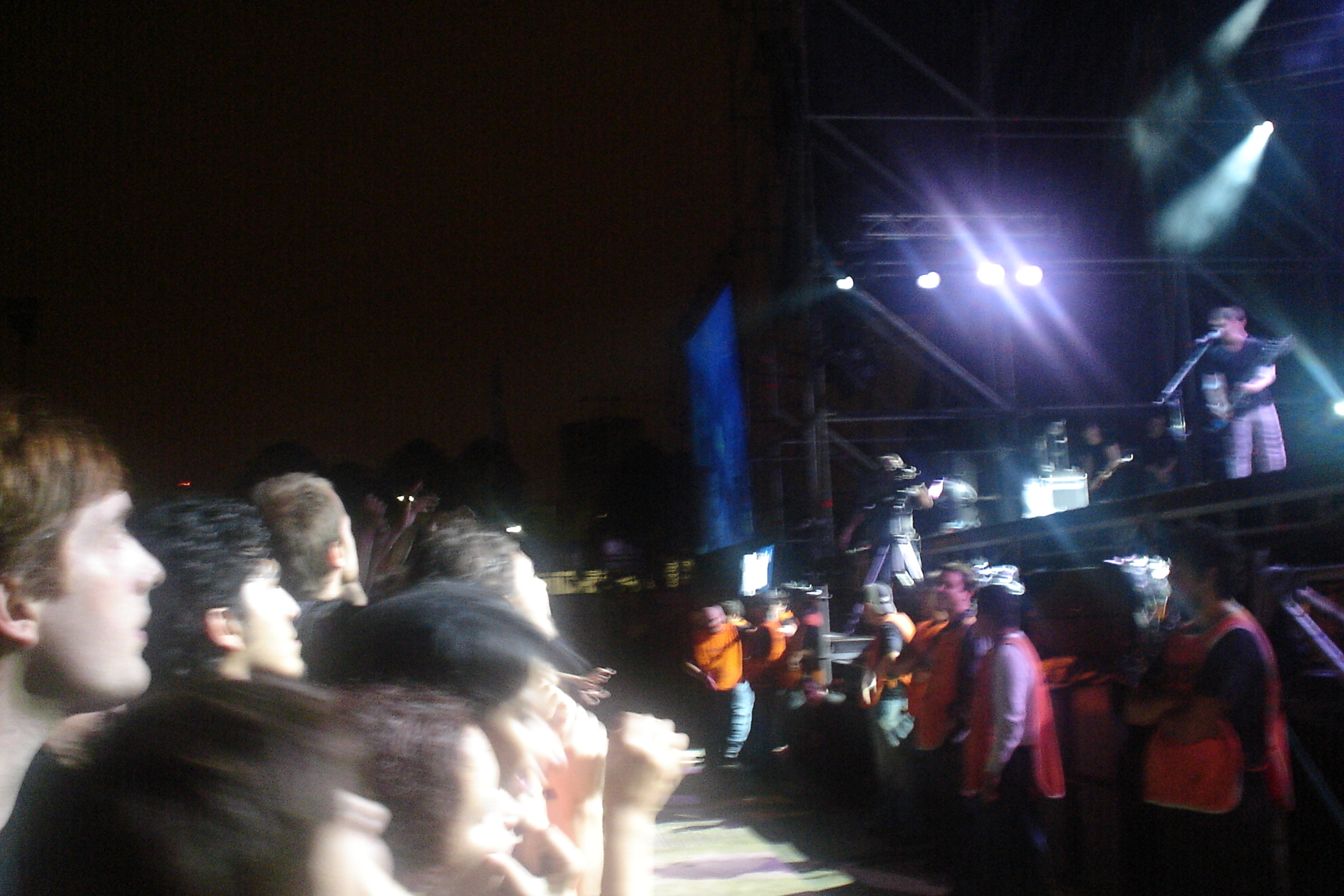
Opening Night, 2007, Placebo's concert

== Previous festivals ==
Former participating bands included Die Toten Hosen, The Wailers, The Offspring, Gustavo Cerati, Los Ratones Paranoicos, Divididos, Memphis, Bersuit Vergarabat, Café Tacuba, Babasónicos, Attaque 77, Los Pericos, Luis Alberto Spinetta, La Mancha de Rolando, Intoxicados, El Otro Yo and several others.

== 2007 ==
Acts in this edition included Aerosmith (attendance at about 150 000 spectators), Placebo, Keane, Evanescence, Velvet Revolver, Bad Religion, The Psychedelic Furs, Los Ratones Paranoicos, Divididos, Babasónicos, Los Piojos, Catupecu Machu, Árbol, and others. Tickets for the 4 days were on sale since January 7, 2007. And tickets for date are on sale since January 29, 2006. On April 1, Ticketek announced that over 200,000 tickets has been sold and are almost sold out for the four days.

== 2008 ==
Day 1: March 30, 2008 Ozzy Osbourne, Korn, Black Label Society.

Day 2: April 4, 2008 Bersuit Vergarabat, Intoxicados, La Vela Puerca.

Day 3: April 5, 2008 Los Piojos, Las Pelotas, No Te Va Gustar, Los Ratones Paranoicos.

Day 4: April 6, 2008 Lenny Kravitz (cancelled), Divididos, Catupecu Machu.

== 2009 ==
Day 1: March 24, 2009 Radiohead - Kraftwerk - La Portuaria.

Day 2: March 28, 2009 Iron Maiden - Sepultura - Lauren Harris Band - Horcas - O Connor.

Day 3: April 4, 2009 Los Piojos - Divididos - Los Cafres - Kapanga - Fidel Nadal.

Day 4: April 5, 2009 Kiss - Ratones Paranoicos - Las Pelotas - Molotov - Massacre.

== 2010 ==
January 21 and 22, 2010. Included Metallica, Horcas, O'Connor, Un Leon D-mente (Leon Gieco and D-Mente) and Héroes del Asfalto.

== 2011 ==
April 5, 2011: The Flaming Lips, Volador G and Massacre.

May 19, 2011: Jack Johnson, Los tipitos, Laura Marling and others.

May 20, 2011: Jamiroquai, Dante Spinetta, Banda de Turistas, No lo soporto and others.

May 21, 2011: Babasónicos, Jauria, Los Cafres, Las Pelotas, Cultura Profetica and others.

May 22, 2011: Bersuit Vergarabat, Ciro y los Persas, Kapanga, Mancha de Rolando, Estelares and others.

== 2012 ==
April 3: Jauria, Joan Jett and the Blackhearts, †††, Band of Horses, MGMT, Foo Fighters

April 4: Massacre, Cage the Elephant, Joan Jett and the Blackhearts, TV on the Radio, Arctic Monkeys, Foo Fighters

April 7: Banda de Turistas, Catupecu Machu, Las Pelotas, Fito Paez, Charly Garcia
