= Estadio Monumental (Buenos Aires) =

Stadium in Buenos Aires, Argentina

Monumental Stadium
- Estadio Monumental
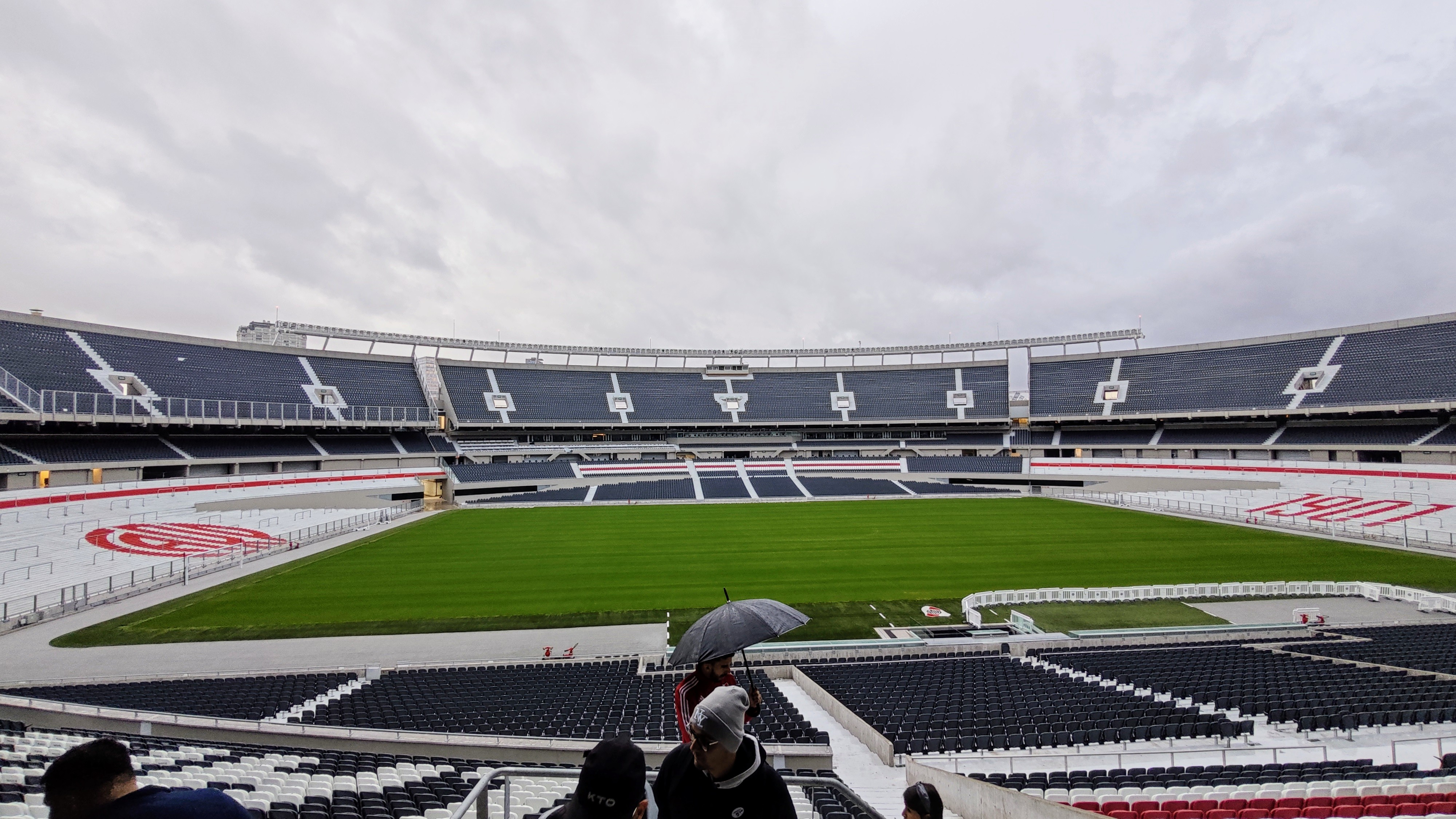
- View of the stadium in 2024
- Interactive map of Monumental Stadium
- Full name: Estadio Monumental
- Former names: Estadio Monumental (1938–1986); Estadio Monumental Antonio Vespucio Liberti (1986–2022); Estadio Mas Monumental (2022–2026)
- Address: Av. Figueroa Alcorta 7597; Buenos Aires; Argentina
- Coordinates: 34°32′43″S 58°26′59″W
- Owner: CA River Plate
- Capacity: 85,018
- Surface: GrassMaster
- Record attendance: 100,000 (River Plate 2–0 Racing, 17 Aug 1975)
- Field size: 105 × 70 m
- Current use: Football matches; Concerts
- Public transit: Belgrano Norte Line at Ciudad Universitaria station; Buses connecting stadium to: Mitre Line at Núñez railway station (1.6 km away); at Congreso de Tucumán (1.9 km away)

Construction
- Built: 1936–1938
- Opened: 26 May 1938
- Renovated: 1958, 1978, 2020–2028
- Architects: José Aslan; Héctor Ezcurra

Tenant
- River Plate (1938–present); Argentina national football team (1942–present); Argentina national rugby union team (2000–2002)

Website
- cariverplate.com.ar/mas-monumental

The Estadio Monumental (Spanish pronunciation: [esˈtaðjo mˌonumentˈal]; lit. 'Monumental Stadium', named after its monumental structure), also known as Estadio River Plate, is an association football stadium in Buenos Aires, Argentina. Located in the Belgrano neighbourhood, it is the home of River Plate.

It was opened on 26 May 1938 and was previously (1986–2022) named after former club president Antonio Vespucio Liberti (1900–1978). It is the largest stadium in both Argentina and all of South America with a capacity of 85,018 and is also home of the Argentina national football team. It was the main venue in the 1951 Pan American Games. It hosted the 1978 FIFA World Cup final between Argentina and the Netherlands. It has also hosted four finals of the Copa América, most recently in 2011, as well as many finals of the Copa Libertadores.

== History ==
The Club Atlético River Plate was founded in 1901 and by 1934, it had won two championships. At the time, the club was nicknamed Los Millonarios (The Millionaires) because of the purchase of forward Carlos Peucelle for whom River had paid a huge amount of money. On 31 October 1934, River Plate purchased the land where the club was to build the new stadium in the neighbourhood of Belgrano.

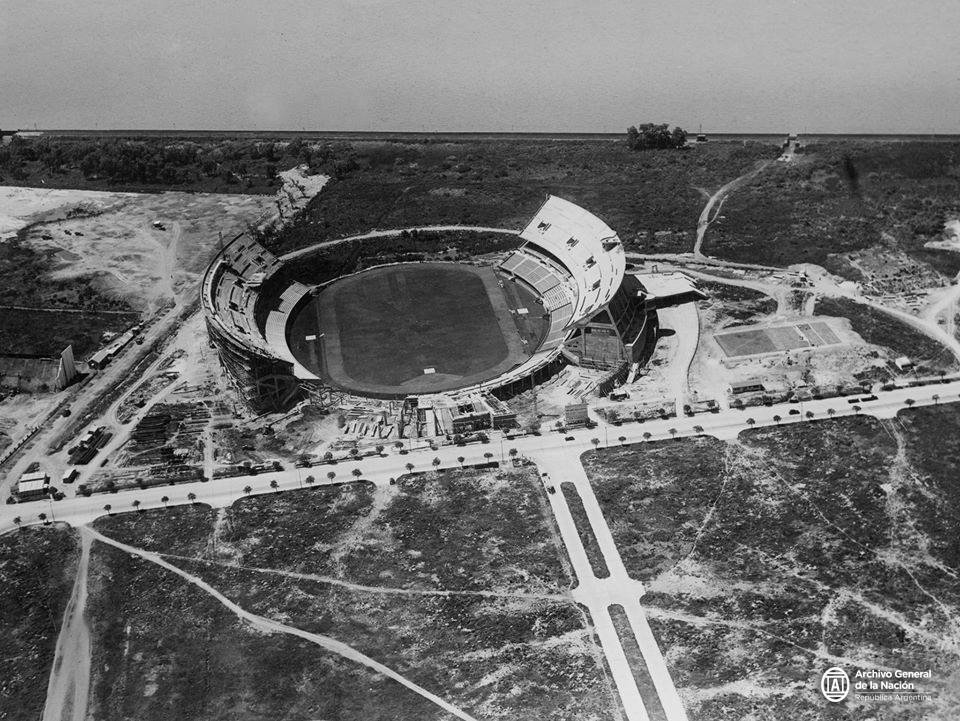
The stadium under construction, 1937

El Monumental was built on land reclaimed from the marshy coast of Río de la Plata. On 25 May 1935, the cornerstone was laid on the Centennial (now Figueroa Alcorta) and Río de la Plata (Udaondo) Avenues. On 1 December of that year, the Steering Committee presented the approved project in detail to its members at an assembly. They obtained a loan of $2,500,000 from the government and on 27 September 1936, construction began under the direction of architects José Aslan and Héctor Ezcurra.

The initial cost of work reached the figure of $4,479,545.80, but was reduced to about 3 million dollars when the committee decided to halt the construction of the north end of the stadium due to a lack of adequate funds.

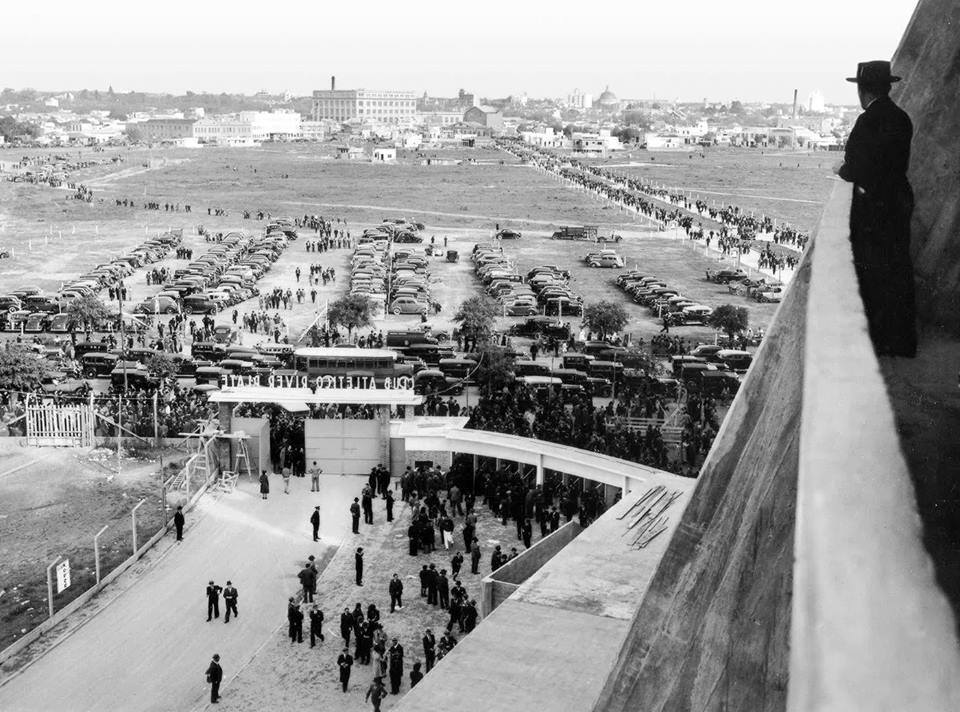
Entrance to the stadium on the day of its inauguration

The foundation of the stadium was to be six or eight feet deep. This required open pit excavation to ensure the stability of the ground, and pumping bilge water from the site. The construction of the three stands was completed in two years. There are 50 km of steps, with 26,000 square metres of reinforced concrete and almost 3,000 tons of steel.

The stadium was inaugurated on Wednesday 26 May, amidst a crowd of approximately 70,000 people. They witnessed the handing over of an Argentine flag, one from the club, paid for by a group of associates, and then sang the national anthem and the River Plate chant. The next day, nearly 68,000 spectators were present. After various activities the evening ended with a match between River Plate and Uruguay team Peñarol, with a 3–1 victory for the home squad.

In November 2014, the stadium's display was removed and a new LED one was installed; this one is 19.45 m wide and 7.16 m tall, tripling the size of the old one and making it the largest in a South American stadium.

Estadio Monumental began an extensive renovation in August 2020. The first phase was the removal of the athletics track and the replacement of the entire pitch, which was lowered by 6 feet and replaced with a hybrid grass pitch (95% natural, 5% artificial). The team moved back into the stadium in February 2021 once the new pitch was installed. Construction continued with the addition of four new standing sections where the old athletics track used to be, bringing fans much closer to the pitch. The existing wooden seats were also removed, with 40,565 set aside for sale. The renovations were ready by March 2023. River Plate drew an average home attendance of 83,812 in their first league season after the expansion.

From 2022 to September 2026 the stadium's naming rights were purchased by supermarket chain ChangoMâs.

In January 2026, it was announced that the Estadio Monumental would undergo another expansion. This would increase its capacity to an attendance of 101,000, and would include the construction of a roof to cover the stands. It is estimated to take around 36 months and could cost around $100 million.

== Notable events ==
When the Monumental project was originally designed, it consisted of four double decker stands. As the bank loan was not enough to carry out the entire project, the stadium was left with a horseshoe shape. The horseshoe was partially enclosed in 1958, under the club presidency of Enrique Pardo. The new construction, the first tier Colonia stand, was financed by proceeds from the mn$10 million transfer of Omar Sivori to Juventus of Italy. With the new construction the stadium's capacity reached 90,000.

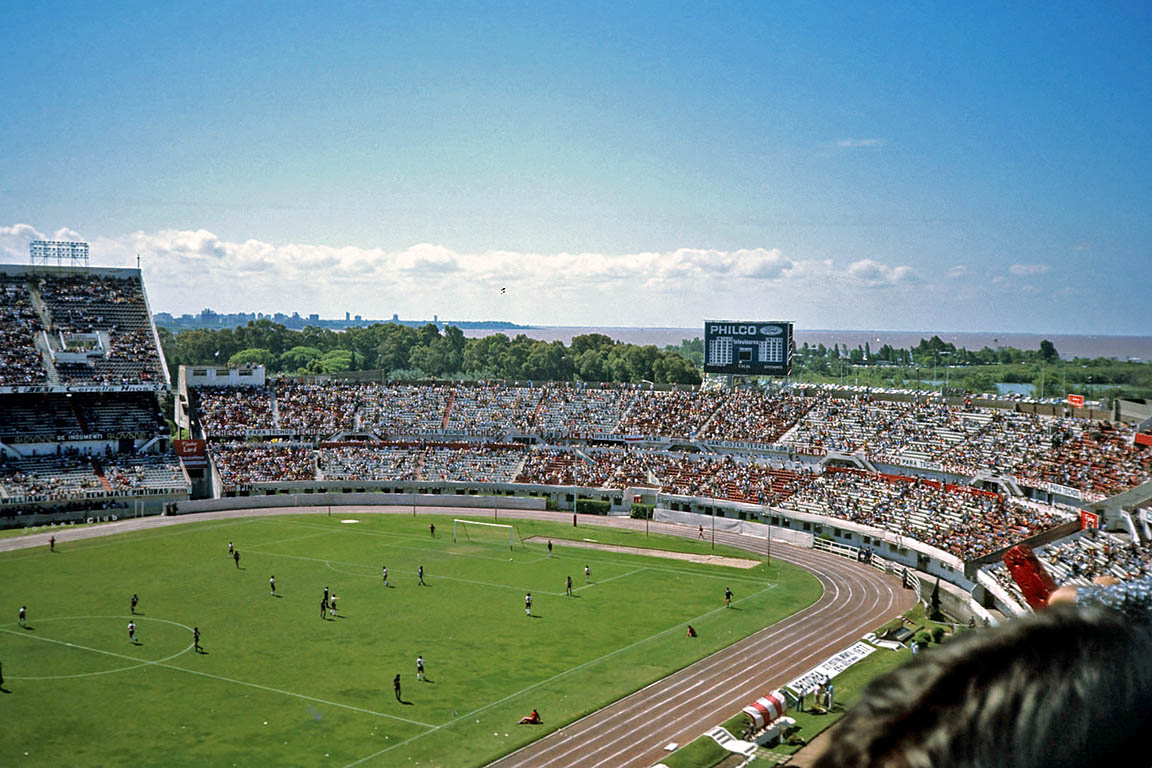
View of the stadium before the remodeling for the FIFA World Cup 1978. Only one tier of the Sivori stand had been built by then

The stadium was remodelled and finally completed to meet the original project after Argentina was awarded the right to host the 1978 World Cup. River Plate was lent money by the Military Government in charge of the country at the time but they struggled to meet repayments due to the changes of currency, which had a detrimental effect on the team. Monumental was the headquarters for the 1978 World Cup. The venue was opened on 1 June for the match between West Germany and Poland. They hosted seven more games, including the final between Argentina and the Netherlands.

San Lorenzo earned the record for highest number of people attending a match for a visiting team in 1982. In their second division match against Tigre, San Lorenzo (which did not have a stadium at the time), brought more than 70,000 people to River's stadium. In 1975 when River played Racing for the title (after an 18 years drought) 100,000 were present. At the end of the 1986 and 1996 Copa Libertadores second-leg finals (both against América de Cali), more seats were added and approximately 86,000 spectators were in attendance. It is estimated that for the Argentina versus Uruguay 1987 Copa América semifinal more than 87,000 spectators attended. In 1993, in a qualification match for the 1994 FIFA World Cup, Argentina lost 5–0 to Colombia, its greatest ever defeat at home. Since then, however, Argentina had never lost a match in World Cup qualifying within this stadium until Ecuador won 2–0 on 8 October 2015.

The total length of the seating in the stands of the stadium is over 70 kilometers.

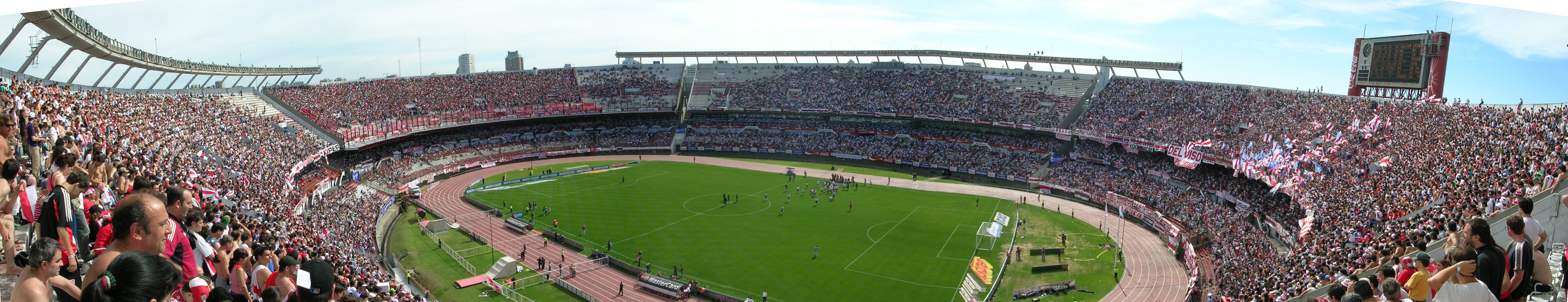
Panoramic view from inside the stadium. River Plate played Independiente in the Apertura 2004, Round 16. River Plate won 3–0

== Sporting events ==
The Monumental, aside from being River Plate's home ground, also accommodates the Argentina national football team in their home games for events such as the FIFA World Cup qualification.

The Monumental also hosted the closing ceremonies and the athletics events of the First Pan American Games in 1951. The stadium host the first Super Special Stage of the 2007 Rally Argentina of WRC.

Rugby union matches featuring the Argentina national rugby union team, Los Pumas, also take place occasionally on this field, although the Pumas more frequently play at other stadiums.

=== Football ===
==== 1978 FIFA World Cup ====
The stadium served as venue for the following matches during the World Cup:

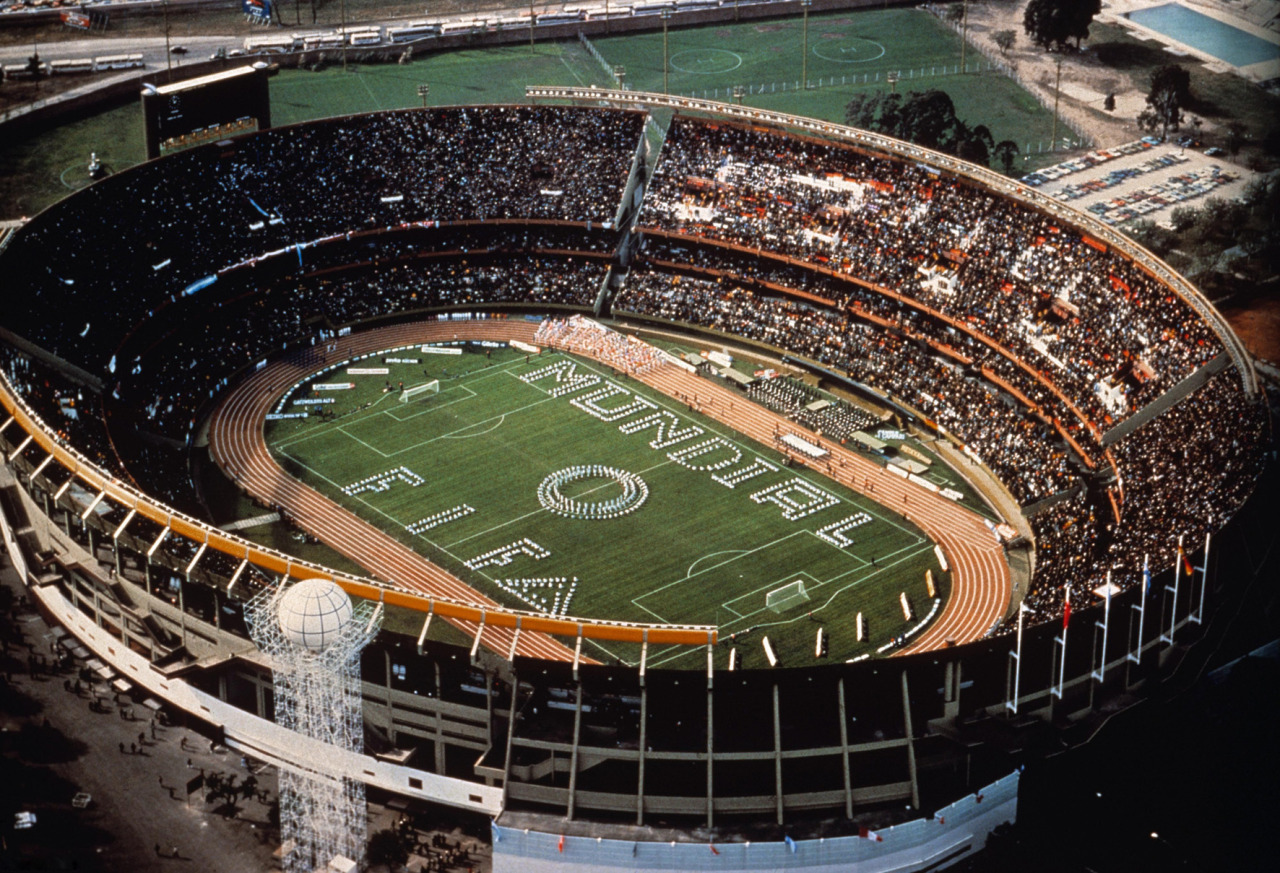
View of the stadium during the opening of the 1978 FIFA World Cup

Date	Round	Gr.	Team 1	Score	Team 2
1 June	1	2	West Germany	0–0	Poland
2 June	1	1	Argentina	2–1	Hungary
6 June	1	1	Argentina	2–1	France
10 June	1	1	Italy	1–0	Argentina
14 June	2	A	West Germany	0–0	Italy
18 June	2	A	Italy	1–0	Austria
21 June	2	A	Netherlands	2–1	Italy
24 June	Third place game		Brazil	2–1	Italy
25 June	Final		Argentina	3–1 (a.e.t.)	Netherlands

==== International friendly matches ====
Date	Local	R	Visit
14 May 1953	Argentina	3–1	England
5 July 1953	Argentina	1–0	Spain
24 June 1956	Argentina	1–0	Italy
24 July 1960	Argentina	2–0	Spain
18 November 1961	Argentina	1–2	Soviet Union
28 March 1962	Argentina	1–0	Mexico
1 December 1965	Argentina	1–1	Soviet Union
28 November 1976	Argentina	0–0	Soviet Union
25 April 1979	Argentina	2–1	Bulgaria
9 October 1980	Argentina	2–0	Bulgaria
12 October 1980	Argentina	2–1	Poland
28 October 1981	Argentina	1–2	Poland
11 November 1981	Argentina	1–1	Czechoslovakia
24 March 1982	Argentina	1–1	Germany
14 April 1982	Argentina	1–1	Soviet Union
2 August 1984	Argentina	0–0	Uruguay
9 May 1985	Argentina	1–1	Paraguay
14 May 1985	Argentina	2–0	Chile
20 June 1987	Argentina	0–1	Paraguay
18 June 1992	Argentina	1–0	Australia
27 December 1994	Argentina	1–0	Yugoslavia
8 November 1995	Argentina	0–1	Brazil
25 May 1998	Argentina	2–0	South Africa
4 September 1999	Argentina	2–0	Brazil
24 May 2010	Argentina	5–0	Canada
7 September 2010	Argentina	4–1	Spain
20 June 2011	Argentina	4–0	Albania
4 June 2014	Argentina	3–0	Trinidad and Tobago
23 March 2023	Argentina	2–0	Panama
3 October 2026	Argentina	7–0	Burkina Faso
6 October 2026	Argentina	3-0	Benin

=== Rugby union test matches ===
12 November 2000

Argentina	33–37	South Africa

Attendance:65,000
Referee: (Scott Young (Australia) )

1 December 2001

Argentina	20–24	New Zealand

Attendance: 69,000
Referee: (Scott Young (Australia) )

2 November 2002

Argentina	6–17	Australia

Attendance: 65,000
Referee: (Kevin Deaker (New Zealand) )

== Concerts ==
When an international performing artist or band visits Buenos Aires, the concerts are usually held in this stadium, as it is the biggest in the city and in all of Argentina.

In December 1987, Sting, former leader of The Police, performed at River Plate, making his debut in Argentina as soloist. He was the first artist to perform to sell out the venue.

The stadium played host to Amnesty International's final Human Rights Now! benefit concert on 15 October 1988. The show was headlined by Bruce Springsteen and the E Street Band, and also featured Sting, Peter Gabriel, Tracy Chapman, Youssou N'Dour, León Gieco and Charly García. The concert was attended by 75,000 people.

David Bowie played at the stadium on 29 September 1990 as part of his Sound+Vision Tour, selling more than 81,900 tickets.

On 5 October 1990, Eric Clapton played a concert during his Journeyman World Tour in front of a sold-out crowd of 70,000 people.

INXS performed at the stadium on 22 January 1991 during The X Factor World Tour.

Prince performed at the stadium in January 1991 as part of the Festival Rock & Pop. The festival included singers Robert Plant, Joe Cocker and Billy Idol, among others.

Elton John performed at the stadium on 21 and 22 November 1992 during The One Tour. It was his first performance in Argentina and on 3 November 1995 during the Made in England Tour.

Paul Simon performed at the stadium in December 1992 for the Derby Festival. The festival also featured The Cult, John Kay, Inspiral Carpets, among others.

Guns N' Roses first performed at the stadium on 5 and 6 December 1992 as part of their Use Your Illusion Tour. Over half a year later on 16–17 July 1993, the band played two additional concerts as the final shows of the same tour, marking their last performances with most of their original lineup for over two decades. Twenty-three years later, the group reunited with classic members Slash and Duff McKagan, playing two shows on 4–5 November 2016, as part of the Not in This Lifetime... Tour, followed by a show on 30 September 2022, as part of the We're F'N' Back! Tour.

In 1993, Michael Jackson performed three sold-out concerts as part of his Dangerous World Tour at the stadium, on 8, 10 and 12 October, for a total audience of 240,000 people. The last concert was recorded for a documentary which was later cancelled by Jackson due to his being unsatisfied with the performance. However, the concert was leaked online in 2009.

Paul McCartney played three concerts at the stadium in December 1993 during The New World Tour, his first performances in the country. In November 2010, he returned to Estadio Monumental to play two concerts to a crowd of 82,000, as part of his Up and Coming Tour, as well as two concerts in October 2024 as part of his Got Back tour.

Phil Collins performed at the stadium on 23 and 24 April 1995 during the Both Sides of the World Tour.

The Rolling Stones performed five sold-out concerts at the stadium during the Voodoo Lounge Tour in 1995. The band performed five times once again in 1998 for the Bridges to Babylon Tour, and two more times in 2006 during the Bigger Bang tour. Recordings of the last concerts were released as part of the four-disc concert DVD The Biggest Bang in 2007.

Punk rock band The Ramones played its final South American show on 16 March 1996.

Luis Miguel sold out two concerts for over 120,000 thousand people in December 1996.

Backstreet Boys performed at the stadium on 28 April 2001 during their Black & Blue Tour.

On 6 October 2001 Eric Clapton performed at the stadium during his Reptile World Tour, selling a total of 35,000 tickets.

Red Hot Chili Peppers played a concert at the stadium on 16 October 2002 during their By The Way Tour. They played another concert on 18 September 2011 during the I'm with You World Tour. The band later returned for two concerts on 24 and 26 November 2023, as part of the Global Stadium Tour.

In 1998, U2 brought their PopMart Tour to South America and performed Mothers of the Disappeared with the Mothers of the Plaza de Mayo, the mothers of the children who had disappeared under the Argentinian and Chilean dictatorships, brought on stage. The band returned for their Vertigo Tour in 2006 to film what would become U2 3D, the first live-action digital 3D film.

Madonna performed two sold-out concerts in October 1993 during The Girlie Show and another four in December 2008, during her Sticky & Sweet Tour; two of these concerts were filmed and later released on a CD/DVD titled Sticky & Sweet Tour. She holds the record for the fastest ticket sales with more than 263,000 tickets sold in three hours for her four 2008 shows. She also performed at the stadium on 13 and 15 December 2012 as part of The MDNA Tour.

Taylor Swift played 3 shows at the stadium on 9-12 November 2023 as part of The Eras Tour. This marked her first tour stop in Argentina. The show on the 10th was rescheduled to the 12th due to inclement weather.

In 2003, Shakira played a sold-out concert as part of her Tour of the Mongoose, becoming the first female Latin artist to sell out River Plate Stadium.

Robbie Williams performed at the stadium on 14 and 15 October during his 2006 Close Encounters Tour.

On 15–16 May 2007, the cast of the 2006 Disney Channel movie High School Musical performed at Estadio Monumental as part their international tour, entitled High School Musical The Concert.

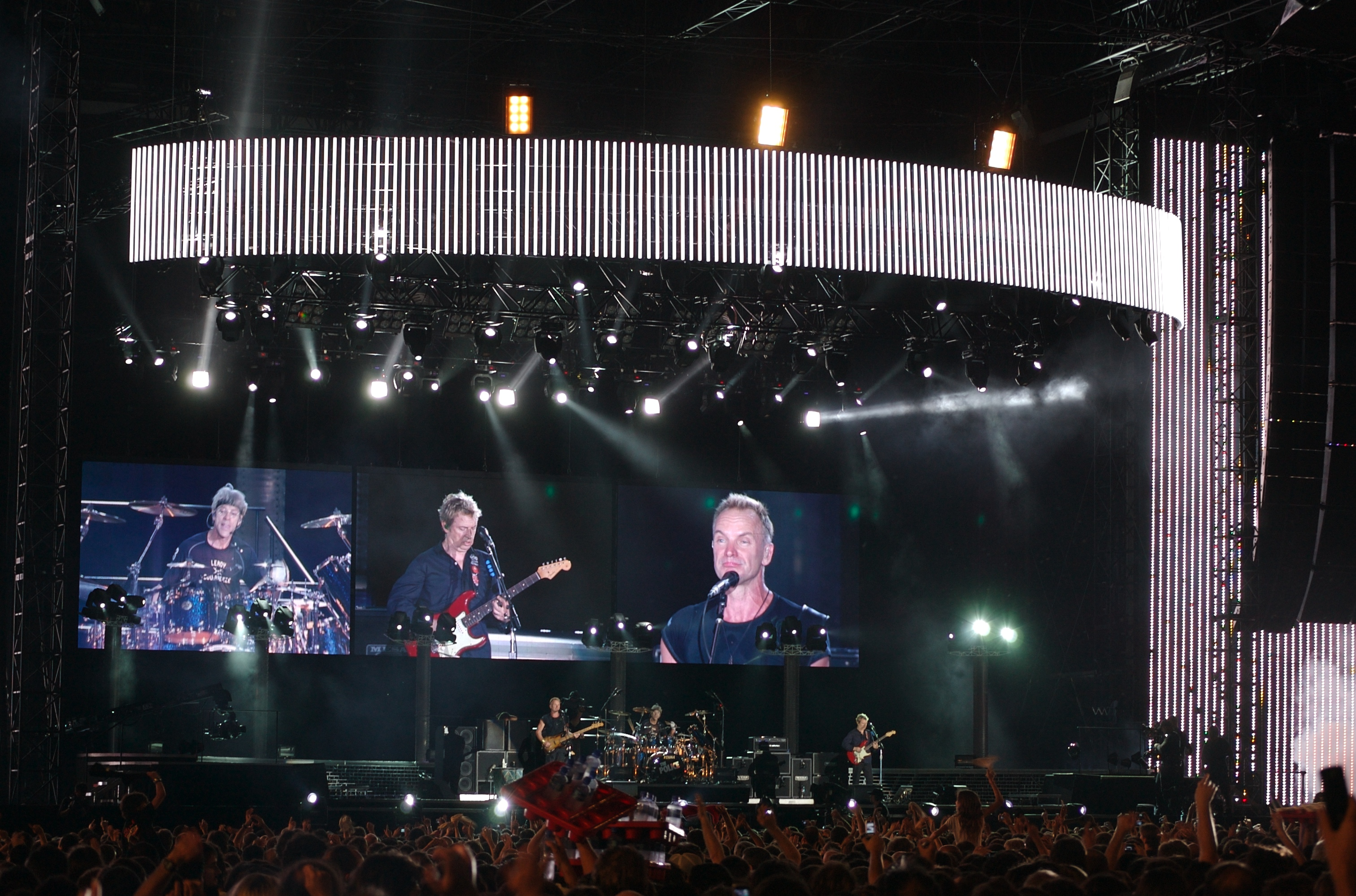
The Police in 2007, during their Reunion Tour

Aerosmith performed at the stadium in 2007 as part of the Quilmes Rock festival. The concert was attended by over 70,000 people. The festival also featured Keane, Evanescence, Velvet Revolver, Bad Religion and The Psychedelic Furs.

The Police performed at Estadio Monumental on 1 and 2 December 2007 during their Reunion Tour. In 2008, the band released the live CD/DVD Certifiable that was recorded during these concerts.

In 2009 the British band Oasis presented one of the biggest concerts in their history. Noel Gallagher and the Argentine public shared an emotional moment, playing "Don't Look Back in Anger".

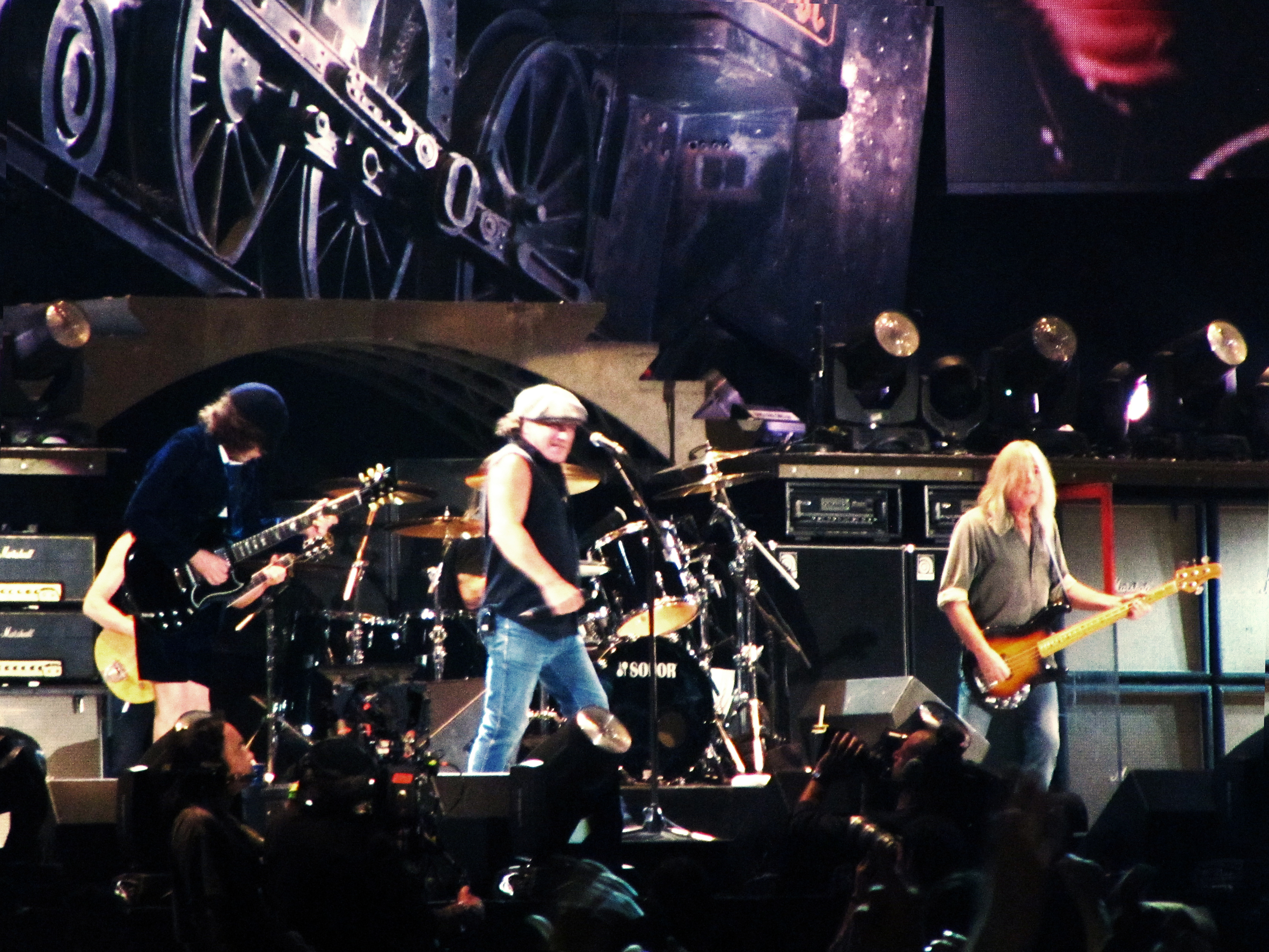
AC/DC in 2009, during their Black Ice World Tour

AC/DC performed three sold-out shows in December 2009 during their Black Ice World Tour. These shows were filmed and released on the DVD Live at River Plate in May 2011. In November 2012, they released a live album of the second of the three shows, which happened on 4 December. The band is set to perform again on 23 March 2026 as part of their Power Up Tour.

Bon Jovi have played at the stadium numerous times, most recently in 2010 as part of The Circle Tour.

Coldplay performed at the stadium on 26 February 2010 during the Viva la Vida Tour. They returned in 2022 and played a record-breaking ten shows as part of their Music of the Spheres World Tour, the most of any musical act at the stadium. The shows were attended by a total of 626,841 spectators for a total box score revenue of $49.8 million, a record in Latin American concert history.

In May 2011, Miley Cyrus brought her Gypsy Heart Tour which sold out in a week, filling the stadium with 65,000 people and becoming the third female artist to sell out the stadium after Shakira and Madonna.

Roger Waters performed nine concerts at the stadium in March 2012 as part of his The Wall Live tour. Waters played the eponymous album in its entirety at all the shows. Kiss played on 3 September 1994; 14 March 1997; 10 April 1999; 5 April 2009 and 7 November 2012. The 2009 concert was recorded and eventually released as a live six song DVD included on the Sonic Boom three disc package. Lady Gaga performed a sold-out show here for her tour The Born This Way Ball on 16 November 2012.

The Monsters of Rock festival was held in the stadium in 1994 with Kiss, Black Sabbath and Slayer, and in 1999 with Metallica and Sepultura. Metallica again performed at the stadium in 2010 in the World Magnetic Tour.

Iron Maiden performed at the venue on 27 September 2013 as part of the Maiden England World Tour. The British metallers performed for over 60,000 people in a 145-minute show.

Soda Stereo performed the final concert on 20 September 1997 during the farewell tour. This concert was recorded and released in two parts, El Último Concierto A and B and DVD. Later they performed a series of six sold-out historic concerts at the stadium in 2007 during the tour Me Verás Volver, holding the record of the South American and Spanish bands, with the most sold-out concerts at the same stadium. One of the concerts was recorded and became the CD/DVD Gira Me Verás Volver.

Lali perfoemed at the venue on 6 and 7 June 2026 as part of ger Lali Tour 2025/26. She became the fastest Argentine act to sell out one and two shows (2.5 and 7 hours, respectively).

List of concerts
Year	Date	Performer	Opening act	Event	Attendance	Additional notes
1987	11 December	Sting	Fito Páez	Nothing Like the Sun Tour		First international artist and first artist ever to perform with sold out tickets at the venue.
1988	3 January	Tina Turner	Os Paralamas do Sucesso	Break Every Rule World Tour		
1988	15 October	Bruce Springsteen & The E Street Band, Sting, Peter Gabriel, Tracy Chapman, Youssou N'Dour, León Gieco, Charly García		Human Rights Now!		
1989	3 March	Rod Stewart	Luis Alberto Spinetta	Out of Order Tour		
1990	29 September	David Bowie	Bryan Adams	Sound+Vision Tour	60.356	
1990	5 October	Eric Clapton	Mick Taylor	Journeyman World Tour		
1991	14 January	Billy Idol		Charmed Life Tour		
1991	21 January	Prince, Robert Plant, Joe Cocker, Billy Idol		Rock & Pop Festival		
1991	22 January	INXS		The X Factor World Tour		
1992	21 November	Elton John	Nito Mestre	The One Tour		
1992	22 November	Elton John	Nito Mestre	The One Tour		
1992	5 December	Guns N' Roses	Pappo, Ratones Paranoicos	Use Your Illusion Tour		
1992	6 December	Guns N' Roses	Pappo, Ratones Paranoicos	Use Your Illusion Tour		
1992	7 December	Paul Simon, The Cult, John Kay, Inspiral Carpets, Nito Mestre		Derby Festival		
1992	8 December	Paul Simon, The Cult, John Kay, Inspiral Carpets, Nito Mestre		Derby Festival		
1992	19 December	Serú Girán				
1992	20 December	Serú Girán				
1993	16 July	Guns N' Roses	La Guardia del Fuego, Los Guarros	Use Your Illusion Tour		Last two performances of the band's original line up for over two decades.
1993	17 July	Guns N' Roses	La Guardia del Fuego, Los Guarros	Use Your Illusion Tour		Last two performances of the band's original line up for over two decades.
1993	8 October	Michael Jackson		Dangerous World Tour		
1993	10 October	Michael Jackson		Dangerous World Tour		
1993	12 October	Michael Jackson		Dangerous World Tour		
1993	30 October	Madonna		The Girlie Show		
1993	31 October	Madonna		The Girlie Show		
1993	10 December	Paul McCartney	Nito Mestre	The New World Tour		
1993	11 December	Paul McCartney	Nito Mestre	The New World Tour		
1993	12 December	Paul McCartney	Nito Mestre	The New World Tour		
1994	3 September	Black Sabbath, Kiss, Slayer, Hermética		Monsters of Rock		
1994	4 September	Black Sabbath, Kiss, Slayer, Hermética		Monsters of Rock		
1994	17 September	UB40	Os Paralamas do Sucesso, Los Pericos			
1995	9 February	The Rolling Stones	Pappo, Las Pelotas, Ratones Paranoicos	Voodoo Lounge Tour	344.144	
1995	11 February	The Rolling Stones	Pappo, Las Pelotas, Ratones Paranoicos	Voodoo Lounge Tour	344.144	
1995	12 February	The Rolling Stones	Pappo, Las Pelotas, Ratones Paranoicos	Voodoo Lounge Tour	344.144	
1995	14 February	The Rolling Stones	Pappo, Las Pelotas, Ratones Paranoicos	Voodoo Lounge Tour	344.144	
1995	16 February	The Rolling Stones	Pappo, Las Pelotas, Ratones Paranoicos	Voodoo Lounge Tour	344.144	
1995	23 April	Phil Collins		Both Sides of the World Tour		
1995	24 April	Phil Collins		Both Sides of the World Tour		
1995	3 November	Elton John		Made In England Tour		
1995	4 November	Bon Jovi		These Days Tour		
1995	16 November	Fito Páez	Fabiana Cantilo, Los Tres			
1996	16 March	The Ramones	Iggy Pop, Die Toten Hosen, Ataque 77	¡Adios Amigos! Tour		Last show from the band outside USA.
1996	18 October	AC/DC	Rata Blanca, Divididos, Riff	Ballbreaker Tour		
1996	19 October	AC/DC	Rata Blanca, Divididos, Riff	Ballbreaker Tour		
1996	7 December	Luis Miguel		Tour America 1996		
1996	8 December	Luis Miguel		Tour America 1996		
1997	14 March	Kiss	Pantera, V8, Malón	Alive/Worldwide Tour		
1997	20 September	Soda Stéreo	Santos Inocentes	El Último Concierto		
1997	4 October	Enrique Iglesias		Tour Vivir		
1998	5 February	U2	Babasónicos, Illya Kuryaki and the Valderramas	PopMart Tour	160.478	
1998	6 February	U2	Babasónicos, Illya Kuryaki and the Valderramas	PopMart Tour	160.478	
1998	7 February	U2	Babasónicos, Illya Kuryaki and the Valderramas	PopMart Tour	160.478	
1998	29 March	The Rolling Stones	Bob Dylan, Meredith Brooks, Las Pelotas, Viejas Locas	Bridges to Babylon Tour	271.766	The last show was recorded and filmed in an official bootleg and concert film titled Bridges to Buenos Aires.
1998	30 March	The Rolling Stones	Bob Dylan, Meredith Brooks, Las Pelotas, Viejas Locas	Bridges to Babylon Tour	271.766	The last show was recorded and filmed in an official bootleg and concert film titled Bridges to Buenos Aires.
1998	2 April	The Rolling Stones	Bob Dylan, Meredith Brooks, Las Pelotas, Viejas Locas	Bridges to Babylon Tour	271.766	The last show was recorded and filmed in an official bootleg and concert film titled Bridges to Buenos Aires.
1998	4 April	The Rolling Stones	Bob Dylan, Meredith Brooks, Las Pelotas, Viejas Locas	Bridges to Babylon Tour	271.766	The last show was recorded and filmed in an official bootleg and concert film titled Bridges to Buenos Aires.
1998	5 April	The Rolling Stones	Bob Dylan, Meredith Brooks, Las Pelotas, Viejas Locas	Bridges to Babylon Tour	271.766	The last show was recorded and filmed in an official bootleg and concert film titled Bridges to Buenos Aires.
1998	10 April	Kiss	Rammstein	Psycho Circus Tour		
1999	14 May	Metallica, Sepultura, Almafuerte, Catupecu Machu		Monsters of Rock		
2000	15 April	Patricio Rey y sus Redonditos de Ricota		Ultimo Bondi a Finisterre		
2000	16 April	Patricio Rey y sus Redonditos de Ricota		Ultimo Bondi a Finisterre		
2001	28 April	Backstreet Boys		Black & Blue Tour		
2001	6 October	Eric Clapton	Memphis La Blusera	Reptile World Tour		
2002	16 October	Red Hot Chili Peppers		By the Way Tour		
2002	30 November	La Renga		Gira Documento Único		
2003	3 May	Shakira		Tour of the Mongoose		
2003	20 December	Los Piojos		Máquina de Sangre		
2005	17 April	La Renga		Tour Detonador		
2006	21 February	The Rolling Stones	Los Piojos, Las Pelotas, La 25	A Bigger Bang Tour		
2006	23 February	The Rolling Stones	Los Piojos, Las Pelotas, La 25	A Bigger Bang Tour		
2006	1 March	U2	Franz Ferdinand	Vertigo Tour	150.424	Both shows were filmed for the band's concert film U2 3D, the first live-action 3D digital film.
2006	2 March	U2	Franz Ferdinand	Vertigo Tour	150.424	Both shows were filmed for the band's concert film U2 3D, the first live-action 3D digital film.
2006	14 October	Robbie Williams	La Portuaria	Close Encounters Tour		
2006	15 October	Robbie Williams	La Portuaria	Close Encounters Tour		
2007	3 March	Ricky Martin		Black and White Tour	43.549	
2007	17 March	Roger Waters		Dark Side of the Moon Live	107.844	
2007	18 March	Roger Waters		Dark Side of the Moon Live	107.844	
2007	23 March	Alejandro Sanz		El Tren De Los Momentos Tour		The show was filmed and recorded for the singer's concert film and live album El Tren de los Momentos: En Vivo Desde Buenos Aires.
2007	12 April	Aerosmith, Evanescence, Keane, Velvet Revolver, Bad Religion, Babasónicos, Catupecu Machu, Ataque 77, Ratones Paranoicos, Divididos, El Tri, Árbol, Kapanga, Intoxicados		Quilmes Rock		
2007	13 April	Aerosmith, Evanescence, Keane, Velvet Revolver, Bad Religion, Babasónicos, Catupecu Machu, Ataque 77, Ratones Paranoicos, Divididos, El Tri, Árbol, Kapanga, Intoxicados		Quilmes Rock		
2007	14 April	Aerosmith, Evanescence, Keane, Velvet Revolver, Bad Religion, Babasónicos, Catupecu Machu, Ataque 77, Ratones Paranoicos, Divididos, El Tri, Árbol, Kapanga, Intoxicados		Quilmes Rock		
2007	15 April	Aerosmith, Evanescence, Keane, Velvet Revolver, Bad Religion, Babasónicos, Catupecu Machu, Ataque 77, Ratones Paranoicos, Divididos, El Tri, Árbol, Kapanga, Intoxicados		Quilmes Rock		
2007	12 May	Bersuit Vergarabat				
2007	15 May	High School Musical		High School Musical: The Concert		
2007	16 May	High School Musical		High School Musical: The Concert		
2007	19 October	Soda Stereo		Gira Me Verás Volver		
2007	20 October	Soda Stereo		Gira Me Verás Volver		
2007	21 October	Soda Stereo		Gira Me Verás Volver		
2007	26 October	Chayanne		Mi Tiempo Tour		
2007	2 November	Soda Stereo		Gira Me Verás Volver		
2007	3 November	Soda Stereo		Gira Me Verás Volver		
2007	1 December	The Police	Beck, Fiction Plane, Estelares	The Police Reunion Tour	87.967	Both shows were filmed and recorded for the band's concert film and live album Certifiable: Live in Buenos Aires.
2007	2 December	The Police	Beck, Fiction Plane, Estelares	The Police Reunion Tour	87.967	Both shows were filmed and recorded for the band's concert film and live album Certifiable: Live in Buenos Aires.
2007	21 December	Soda Stereo		Gira Me Verás Volver		
2008	30 March	Ozzy Osbourne, Korn, Black Label Society, Rata Blanca, Carajo		Quilmes Rock		
2008	4 December	Madonna	Paul Oakenfold	Sticky & Sweet Tour	263.693	All shows were filmed and recorded for the singer's concert film and live album Sticky & Sweet Tour.
2008	5 December	Madonna	Paul Oakenfold	Sticky & Sweet Tour	263.693	All shows were filmed and recorded for the singer's concert film and live album Sticky & Sweet Tour.
2008	7 December	Madonna	Paul Oakenfold	Sticky & Sweet Tour	263.693	All shows were filmed and recorded for the singer's concert film and live album Sticky & Sweet Tour.
2008	8 December	Madonna	Paul Oakenfold	Sticky & Sweet Tour	263.693	All shows were filmed and recorded for the singer's concert film and live album Sticky & Sweet Tour.
2008	12 December	Los Fabulosos Cadillacs		Satánico Pop Tour		
2008	13 December	Los Fabulosos Cadillacs		Satánico Pop Tour		
2009	5 April	Kiss		Alive 35 World Tour		
2009	3 May	Oasis	Los Tipitos, Estelares	Dig Out Your Soul Tour	48.965	
2009	21 May	The Jonas Brothers	Demi Lovato	Jonas Brothers World Tour 2009	43.502	
2009	30 May	Los Piojos				
2009	2 December	AC/DC	Las Pelotas	Black Ice World Tour	170.630	All shows were filmed and recorded for the band's concert film and live album Live at River Plate.
2009	4 December	AC/DC	Las Pelotas	Black Ice World Tour	170.630	All shows were filmed and recorded for the band's concert film and live album Live at River Plate.
2009	6 December	AC/DC	Las Pelotas	Black Ice World Tour	170.630	All shows were filmed and recorded for the band's concert film and live album Live at River Plate.
2010	21 February	Metallica	Horcas, O'Connor	World Magnetic Tour		
2010	21 February	Metallica	Horcas, O'Connor	World Magnetic Tour		
2010	26 February	Coldplay	Bat For Lashes	Viva la Vida Tour	53.708	
2010	3 October	Bon Jovi	Los Tipitos	The Circle Tour	37.633	
2010	10 October	Paul McCartney	Ciro y los Persas	Up and Coming Tour	91.262	
2010	11 October	Paul McCartney	Ciro y los Persas	Up and Coming Tour	91.262	
2010	13 November	The Jonas Brothers		Jonas Brothers: Live in Concert		
2011	6 May	Miley Cyrus	Valeria Gastaldi	Gypsy Heart Tour		
2011	16 September	Ricky Martin	Miranda!	Musica + Alma + Sexo World Tour		
2011	18 September	Red Hot Chili Peppers	Foals, Massacre	I'm with You World Tour		
2011	12 October	Justin Bieber		My World Tour	66.386	
2011	13 October	Justin Bieber		My World Tour	66.386	
2011	14 October	Eric Clapton	Guasones			
2012	7 March	Roger Waters		The Wall Live (2010–13)	430.678	
2012	9 March	Roger Waters		The Wall Live (2010–13)	430.678	
2012	10 March	Roger Waters		The Wall Live (2010–13)	430.678	
2012	12 March	Roger Waters		The Wall Live (2010–13)	430.678	
2012	14 March	Roger Waters		The Wall Live (2010–13)	430.678	
2012	15 March	Roger Waters		The Wall Live (2010–13)	430.678	
2012	17 March	Roger Waters		The Wall Live (2010–13)	430.678	
2012	18 March	Roger Waters		The Wall Live (2010–13)	430.678	
2012	20 March	Roger Waters		The Wall Live (2010–13)	430.678	
2012	3 April	Foo Fighters, Arctic Monkeys, MGMT, Cage the Elephant, Band of Horses, TV on the Radio, Massacre		Quilmes Rock		
2012	4 April	Foo Fighters, Arctic Monkeys, MGMT, Cage the Elephant, Band of Horses, TV on the Radio, Massacre		Quilmes Rock		
2012	7 November	Kiss	Rata Blanca	Monster World Tour		
2012	16 November	Lady Gaga	Lady Starlight	Born This Way Ball	45.007	
2012	13 December	Madonna	Laidback Luke	The MDNA Tour	89.226	
2012	15 December	Madonna	Laidback Luke	The MDNA Tour	89.226	
2013	12 April	The Cure	Utopians	LatAm 2013		
2013	27 September	Iron Maiden	Slayer, Ghost	Maiden England World Tour	50.680	
2013	9 November	Justin Bieber	Cody Simpson, Carly Rae Jepsen, Owl City	Believe Tour		
2013	10 November	Justin Bieber	Cody Simpson, Carly Rae Jepsen, Owl City	Believe Tour		
2015	28 February	Romeo Santos		Vol. 2 Tour		
2015	1 March	Romeo Santos		Vol. 2 Tour		
2016	4 November	Guns N' Roses	Airbag	Not in This Lifetime... Tour	105.026	
2016	5 November	Guns N' Roses	Airbag	Not in This Lifetime... Tour	105.026	
2016	17 December	La Beriso				
2017	16 December	Abel Pintos		Gira 11		
2017	18 December	Abel Pintos		Gira 11		
2018	15 December	Ciro y los Persas		Naranja Persa Tour		
2022	30 September	Guns N' Roses		We're F'N' Back! Tour	58,312	
2022	25 October	Coldplay	H.E.R., Jin (singer) of BTS	Music of the Spheres World Tour	626,841	Record number of shows, tickets sold and gross revenue at the venue. The performance on 28 October 2022 was broadcast in cinemas around the world and lately featured on the concert film Coldplay – Music of the Spheres: Live at River Plate
2022	26 October	Coldplay	H.E.R., Jin (singer) of BTS	Music of the Spheres World Tour	626,841	Record number of shows, tickets sold and gross revenue at the venue. The performance on 28 October 2022 was broadcast in cinemas around the world and lately featured on the concert film Coldplay – Music of the Spheres: Live at River Plate
2022	28 October	Coldplay	H.E.R., Jin (singer) of BTS	Music of the Spheres World Tour	626,841	Record number of shows, tickets sold and gross revenue at the venue. The performance on 28 October 2022 was broadcast in cinemas around the world and lately featured on the concert film Coldplay – Music of the Spheres: Live at River Plate
2022	29 October	Coldplay	H.E.R., Jin (singer) of BTS	Music of the Spheres World Tour	626,841	Record number of shows, tickets sold and gross revenue at the venue. The performance on 28 October 2022 was broadcast in cinemas around the world and lately featured on the concert film Coldplay – Music of the Spheres: Live at River Plate
2022	1 November	Coldplay	H.E.R., Jin (singer) of BTS	Music of the Spheres World Tour	626,841	Record number of shows, tickets sold and gross revenue at the venue. The performance on 28 October 2022 was broadcast in cinemas around the world and lately featured on the concert film Coldplay – Music of the Spheres: Live at River Plate
2022	2 November	Coldplay	H.E.R., Jin (singer) of BTS	Music of the Spheres World Tour	626,841	Record number of shows, tickets sold and gross revenue at the venue. The performance on 28 October 2022 was broadcast in cinemas around the world and lately featured on the concert film Coldplay – Music of the Spheres: Live at River Plate
2022	4 November	Coldplay	H.E.R., Jin (singer) of BTS	Music of the Spheres World Tour	626,841	Record number of shows, tickets sold and gross revenue at the venue. The performance on 28 October 2022 was broadcast in cinemas around the world and lately featured on the concert film Coldplay – Music of the Spheres: Live at River Plate
2022	5 November	Coldplay	H.E.R., Jin (singer) of BTS	Music of the Spheres World Tour	626,841	Record number of shows, tickets sold and gross revenue at the venue. The performance on 28 October 2022 was broadcast in cinemas around the world and lately featured on the concert film Coldplay – Music of the Spheres: Live at River Plate
2022	7 November	Coldplay	H.E.R., Jin (singer) of BTS	Music of the Spheres World Tour	626,841	Record number of shows, tickets sold and gross revenue at the venue. The performance on 28 October 2022 was broadcast in cinemas around the world and lately featured on the concert film Coldplay – Music of the Spheres: Live at River Plate
2022	8 November	Coldplay	H.E.R., Jin (singer) of BTS	Music of the Spheres World Tour	626,841	Record number of shows, tickets sold and gross revenue at the venue. The performance on 28 October 2022 was broadcast in cinemas around the world and lately featured on the concert film Coldplay – Music of the Spheres: Live at River Plate
2022	3 December	Harry Styles	Koffee	Love On Tour	123,942	
2022	4 December	Harry Styles	Koffee	Love On Tour	123,942	
2023	18 October	The Weeknd	Kaytranada, Mike Dean	After Hours til Dawn Tour	116,695	
2023	19 October	The Weeknd	Kaytranada, Mike Dean	After Hours til Dawn Tour	116,695	
2023	9 November	Taylor Swift	Sabrina Carpenter, Louta	The Eras Tour		
2023	11 November	Taylor Swift	Sabrina Carpenter, Louta	The Eras Tour		
2023	12 November	Taylor Swift	Sabrina Carpenter, Louta	The Eras Tour		
2023	21 November	Roger Waters	-	This Is Not a Drill		
2023	22 November	Roger Waters	-	This Is Not a Drill		
2023	24 November	Red Hot Chili Peppers	-	Global Stadium Tour		
2023	26 November	Red Hot Chili Peppers	-	Global Stadium Tour		
2023	2 December	Duki	-			
2023	3 December	Duki	-			
2023	8 December	Tan Bionica	-	La Última Noche Mágica		
2024	22 March	Maria Becerra		LNDA Tour		First Argentinian female act to headline at the venue.
2024	23 March	Maria Becerra		LNDA Tour		First Argentinian female act to headline at the venue.
2024	5 October	Paul McCartney	-	Got Back		
2024	6 October	Paul McCartney	-	Got Back		
2025	31 May	Airbag		El Club De La Pelea		
2025	1 June	Airbag		El Club De La Pelea		
2025	5 October	Airbag		El Club De La Pelea		
2025	17 December	Airbag		El Club De La Pelea		
2025	18 December	Airbag		El Club De La Pelea		
2025	4 October	Kendrick Lamar	Ca7riel & Paco Amoroso	Grand National Tour		
2025	7 November	Dua Lipa		Radical Optimism Tour		
2025	8 November	Dua Lipa		Radical Optimism Tour		
2025	15 November	Oasis	Richard Ashcroft	Oasis Live '25 Tour		
2025	16 November	Oasis	Richard Ashcroft	Oasis Live '25 Tour		
2026	13 February	Bad Bunny		DeBÍ TiRAR MáS FOToS World Tour		
2026	14 February	Bad Bunny		DeBÍ TiRAR MáS FOToS World Tour		
2026	15 February	Bad Bunny		DeBÍ TiRAR MáS FOToS World Tour		
2026	23 March	AC/DC	The Pretty Reckless	Power Up Tour		
2026	27 March	AC/DC	The Pretty Reckless	Power Up Tour		
2026	31 March	AC/DC	The Pretty Reckless	Power Up Tour		
2026	6 June	Lali		Lali Tour 2025/26		Fastest Argentine act to sell out one and two shows (2.5 and 7 hours, respectively).
2026	7 June	Lali		Lali Tour 2025/26		Fastest Argentine act to sell out one and two shows (2.5 and 7 hours, respectively).
2027	23 March	U2	Beck	The Greatest Show on Earth World Tour		
2027	25 March	U2	Beck	The Greatest Show on Earth World Tour		
2027	27 March	U2	Beck	The Greatest Show on Earth World Tour		

== Facilities ==
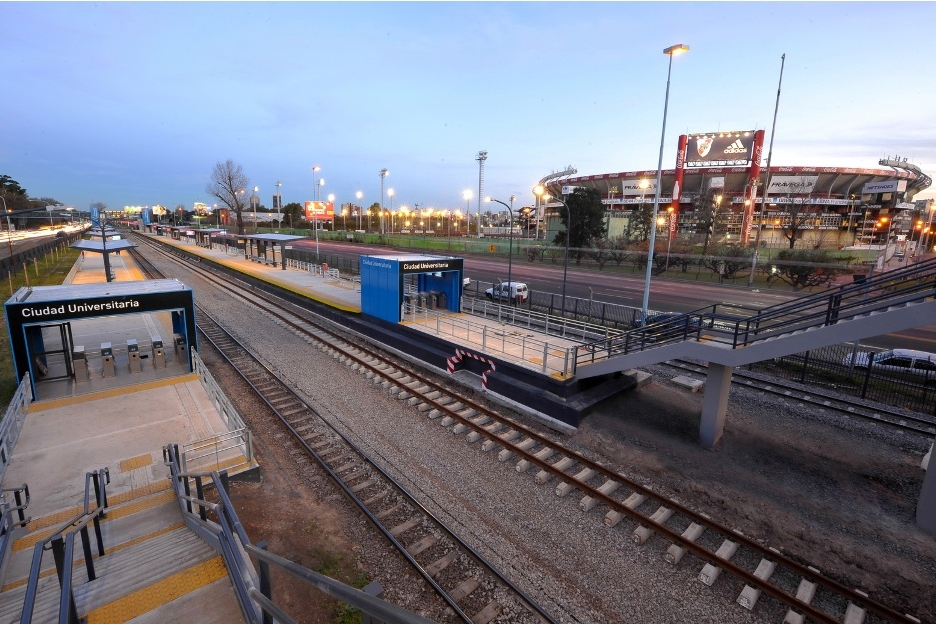
Ciudad Universitaria station next to the stadium

The stadium housed 74,624 people after its renovation for the 1978 World Cup. The opening and final matches were both held in the Monumental, which had a capacity of 76,600 at the time because all of the popular stands were standing-only.

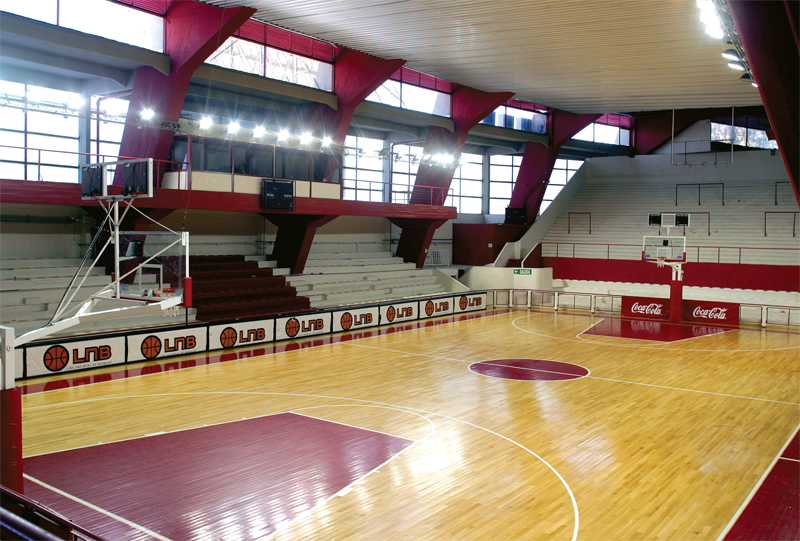
Microestadio, indoor arena that hosts River Plate's basketball and volleyball matches.

The stadium complex also has facilities for tennis, basketball, and other sports, as well as living quarters for young footballers, a theatre hall, a parking lot, museum etc. It can be accessed by several train and bus lines as it is located within walking distance from the Barrancas de Belgrano transportation hub. Contrary to most other stadiums in the Buenos Aires area, there is a sizable car park outside the stadium.

In August 2015, the Ciudad Universitaria station was opened on the Belgrano Norte Line in order to serve both the stadium and the University of Buenos Aires' Ciudad Universitaria campus located on the other side of the tracks. The stadium is linked to the station with a viaduct and the line connects the stadium to both central Buenos Aires through its Retiro terminal and also some of the city's northern outskirts.

== See also ==
- Antonio Vespucio Liberti
- List of stadiums by capacity
- Lists of stadiums

Events and tenants
Preceded by Estadio Nacional; Santiago	Copa América; Final Venue; 1946	Succeeded by Estadio George Capwell; Guayaquil
Preceded by None	Pan American Games; Main Stadium; 1951	Succeeded by Estadio Olímpico Universitario; Mexico City
Preceded by Estadio Nacional; Lima	Copa América; Final Venue; 1959	Succeeded by Estadio Modelo; Guayaquil
Preceded by Waldstadion; Frankfurt	FIFA World Cup; Opening Venue; 1978	Succeeded by Camp Nou; Barcelona
Preceded by Olympiastadion; Munich	FIFA World Cup; Final Venue; 1978	Succeeded by Santiago Bernabéu; Madrid
Preceded by two-legged final	Copa América; Final Venue; 1987	Succeeded by Estádio do Maracanã; Rio de Janeiro
Preceded by Estadio Pachencho Romero; Maracaibo	Copa América; Final Venue; 2011	Succeeded by Estadio Nacional; Santiago
