= Flema =

Flema was an Argentine punk rock band. Their current lineup consists of: Fernando Rossi, on lead vocals and bass guitar; Luis Gribaldo, Miguel de Luna Campos, and Bruno Gonzáles on guitar; and Sergio Lencina on drums. The band is famous for having multiple changes to its lineup over the years - at present, no original members of the band remain in it in its current form. They are notable for being the band which controversial punk figure Ricardo "Ricky" Espinosa headed before his death in 2002. They are known for their songs such as "Borrachos en la esquina", "Semen de buey", and "El blanco cristal".

== History ==
=== Early days and development ===
The band was formed in 1987, in Avellaneda (Buenos Aires Province), where all of its members were teenagers. The band is known for its constant changes in lineup, with Espinosa as the only constant member from its foundation to its end. Flema launched their first record in 1992 ("Pogo, Mosh & Slam"), through 69 Records, an independent label.

The band became successful in the Argentine punk scene. Their shows were marked by chaos, the members usually drunken and high on the stage, with Espinosa fighting with the public and even sniffing cocaine on the stage. Their songs often featured guttural vomit-like sounds performed by Espinosa as one of Flema's trademarks. Happy melodies mixed with profound and touching lyrics written by the perturbed Espinosa caught up the feelings of many teenagers that saw their problems reflected in the songs of that band from the suburbs.

=== Espinosa's death ===
On May 30, 2002, Ricardo Espinosa died falling off a building in Avellaneda. He was 34 years old. On the date of the incident, he was drunk, playing a Winning Eleven match Gribaldo's home, located on the 5th floor of the monoblock he lived in. He said jokingly, "If I lose, I'm gonna jump through the window!" He lost and went to stand on the rails of the balcony, but was disoriented from his inebriation and further destabilized by the wind, causing him to slip.

Ricky had been talking about putting an end to his life for years, even writing songs with titles like "I'm Gonna Commit Suicide", "I Have To Go", and "You Will Remember Me". This caused many to believe it was on purpose. During funeral preparations, the large number of fans and punks at the funeral home caused the owners to suspend it. He was instead mourned at his brothers patio, where Christian Aldana (guitarist and singer of El Otro Yo) as well as Niko Villano (singer of Villanos) also assisted. Three days after his death, the rest of the band put on a show with other local groups in his honor. Flema was temporarily disbanded after that.

Every May 30, hundreds of fans visit Espinosa's tomb at green ward Juan XIII in Avellaneda cemetery.

=== Reformation ===
One November 2, 2007, in order to celebrate the twenty-year anniversary of the band, the surviving members of Flema came back together to perform in concert. Though it was initially meant to be a one-time performance at El Teatro Flores (a major venue in Buenos Aires), the group continued to tour well in to 2008. In 2008, the group officially reunited and resumed prior operations.

== Band members ==
=== Final lineup ===
- Ricky Epinosa - guitar, (1987–1988), lead vocals (1992–1999)
- Luichi Gribaldo - guitar (1994–1999)
- Maximiliano Martin - guitar (1999)
- Fernando Rossi - bass (1993–1999)
- Diego Piazza - drums (1999)

=== Former members ===
- Fernando Cordera - vocals (1987–1988)
- Juan Fandiño - guitar (1987–1988)
- Luis Rossi - guitar (1992)
- Santiago Rossi - guitar (1993–1997)
- Gonzalo Díaz Colodrero - guitar (1993)
- Gustavo Brea - guitar (1998)
- Pablo Sara - bass (1987)
- Alejandro Kohl - bass (1988)
- Cacho Rossi - bass (1992)
- Sebastián Gador - drums (1987–1988)
- Pepe Alsina - drums (1992)
- Alejandro Alsina - drums (1993)
- Pepe Carballo - drums (1994)
- Pablo Martínez - drums (1997–1998)

== Discography ==
=== Studio albums ===
- El primero, 1987
- Corriendo con Satán, 1989
- Pogo, Mosh & Slam, 1992
- El exceso de drogas y alcohol es perjudicial para tu salud... ¡Cuidate, nadie lo hará por vos!, 1994
- Nunca Nos Fuimos, 1995
- Si el placer es un pecado... bienvenidos Al Infierno, 1997
- Resaka, 1998
- Caretofobia I, 2000
- Caretofobia II, 2001
- Cinco de copas, 2002
- No nos rendimos, 2015

=== Live albums ===
- Es una mierd@, 1999
- La noche de las narices blancas, 1999
- Flema Not Dead, volumen I, 2010
- Flema Not Dead, volumen II, 2011

== See also ==
- Argentine rock
- Punk rock
