= Cabezones =

Argentine hardcore-alternative rock band

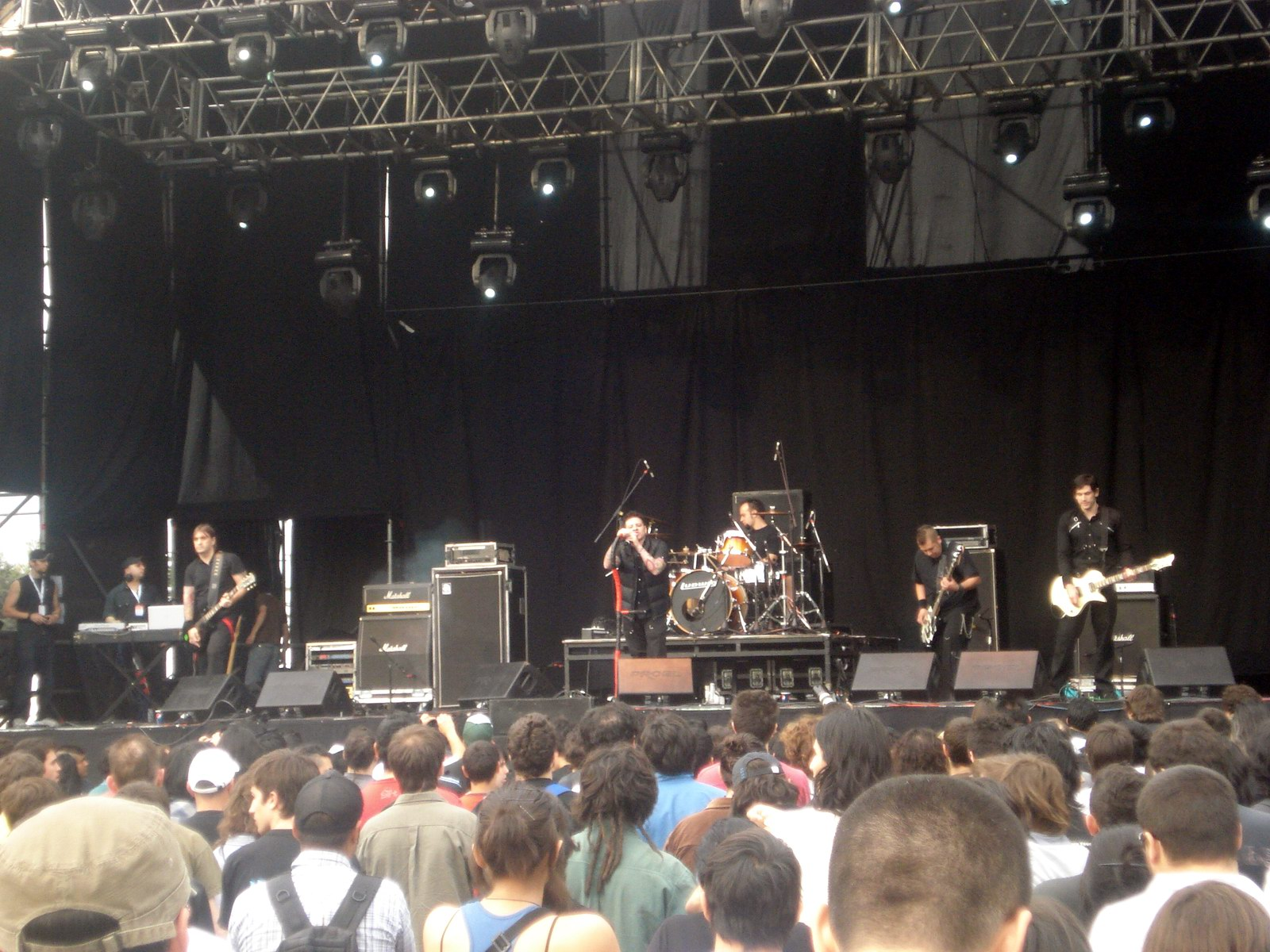
- Cabezones in 2010

Background information
- Origin: Santa Fe, Argentina
- Genres: Hardcore punk; alternative rock; nu metal
- Years active: 1994-present
- Labels: Sony Music, Pop Art Records
- Members: César Andino; Damián Gómez; Marcelo Porta; Eugenio Jauchen
- Past members: Esteban Serniotti; Gustavo Martínez; Leandro Aput; Leonardo Licitra; Pablo Negro; Matías Tarragona; Alejandro Collados
- Website: cabezonesweb.com

Cabezones is an Argentine hardcore-alternative rock band.

== History ==
=== Formation ===
The band, originally from the city of Santa Fe, was formed in 1994. At first, their music was punk, with songs such as "Uniformado de Cagón", but they left that genre behind to start making so-called "hardcore-dark" music.

In 1997 they released Hijos de una nueva tierra, which was published by the independent record label Mentes Abiertas, which they first met in a compilation album along with other alternative rock bands.

=== Alas and Eclipse (Sol) ===
In 1998 the band decided to move to Buenos Aires. Their new record, Alas, produced by ex-Soda Stereo member Zeta Bosio, was edited by Sony Music later that year. This meant a change in the sound direction to a heavier and darker music. In 2002, Alas was edited in Mexico, followed by a ten-month tour throughout the country. Back in Argentina, Cabezones signed a recording contract with Pop Art to edit Eclipse (Sol) in 2003. By the end of that year, Leandro Aput was added as rhythm guitarist.

=== Intraural and Jardin de Extremidad ===
In 2004, the band released an EP called Intraural, which was a selection of 6 songs from Eclipse (Sol) played in acoustic versions.
In April 2005 Jardin de Extremidad is released with 12 new songs combining the sound of the two previous records Alas and Eclipse (Sol). Billed as "Gira de Extremidad", the "Jardin de Extremidad" tour traveled throughout Argentina.
On 18 February 2006 the band recorded its first live CD/DVD titled Bienvenidos, with sold-out tickets at a theater in Buenos Aires.

=== Accident and disbanding ===
In March 2006, a serious car accident left Catupecu Machu bass player, Gabriel Ruiz Diaz, hospitalized for several months. Cesar Andino was the passenger of the car and suffered two broken femurs, one of them an open fracture. After several months of rehabilitation, Cesar Andino was able to perform with Cabezones in the Obras Sanitarias stadium, once again with sold-out tickets. Finally, near Christmas, Cabezones gave which would be the last show with the original members.

In July 2007, Leandro Aput, Esteban Serniotti y Gustavo Martinez left the band. Frontman Cesar Andino, started seeking a solo career, which later ended in the release of the latest Cabezones album.

=== New members and Solo ===
On 29 September 2007, Cabezones played in the Pepsi Music Festival with new members Leonardo Licitra and Pablo Negro in guitars, and Matias Tarragona in bass guitar.

In May 2008 they launched their record, Solo. The first single is called "Mi Reina". The videoclip for this song included various members from other Argentine bands.

The band reunited some time later, and released the CD "Nace".

== Band members ==
=== Current members ===
- César Augusto Andino: Lead vocals
- Romulo Pividori: Drums
- Nano Bernardi: Bass guitar
- Eugenio Jauchen: Lead guitar

=== Former members ===
- Esteban "Pichu" Serniotti : Lead guitar and backing vocals
- Gustavo Martínez: Bass guitar
- Leandro Aput: Rhythm guitar
- Leonardo Licitra: Lead guitar
- Pablo Negro: Rhythm guitar
- Matías Terragona: Bass guitar
- Alejandro Collados: Drums

== Discography ==
=== Albums ===
- Hijos de una nueva tierra (1997)
- Alas (2000)
- Eclipse (Sol) (2002)
- Jardín de Extremidad (2005)
- Bienvenidos (2006) - Live Album (Recorded at El Teatro of Colegiales)
- Bienvenidos (2007) - 2006 Live Album + Live Album recorded in Pepsi Music Festival with guests (Ricardo Mollo, Zeta Bosio and Fernando Ruiz Diaz)
- Solo (2008) (Originally intended to be Cesar Andino's first solo album)
- Nace (2012)
- El Naufragio del Alma (2017)

=== EPs ===
- EP Negro (2001)
- Intraural (2004) (Acoustic)

Early releases These releases are from the band's punk period.

- Self Titled Demo (7 songs/Cassette) (1992)
- Un Grito Más (Demo with 4 songs / Cassette) (1995)
- Electroshock (1995)
