= Antonio Liberti =

Argentine football executive (1902–1978)

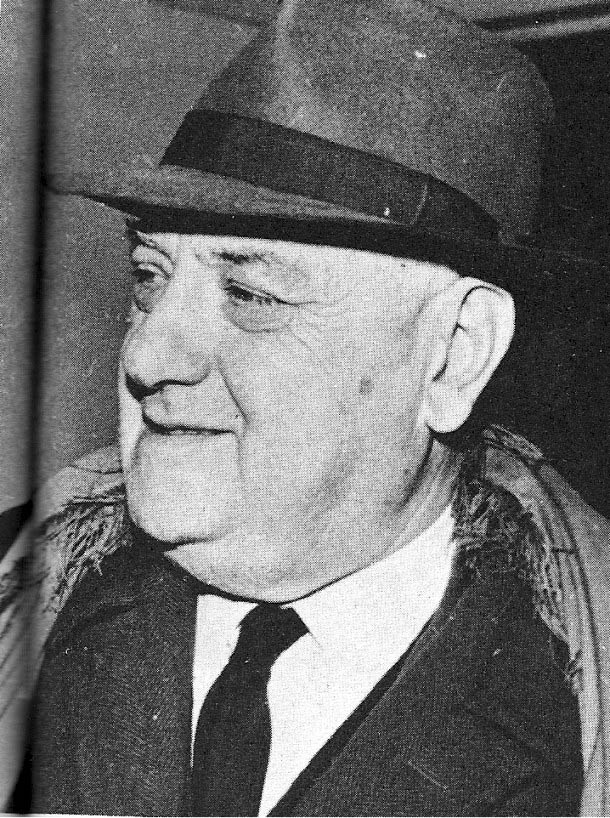
- Born: 1902; Kingdom of Italy
- Died: 28 November 1978 (aged 77–78); Buenos Aires, Argentina
- Occupation: Football executive
- Years active: 1933–35, 1938–40, 1943–52, 1960–67
- Known for: President of River Plate

Antonio Vespucio Liberti (Spanish pronunciation: [anˈtonjo βeˈspusjo liˈβeɾti]; 1900 – 28 November 1978) was a chairman of Club Atlético River Plate. He presided the club four times, becoming the president who was most often in charge of the club, with 20 non-consecutive years in office.

During his periods in charge, River Plate won six titles, three Primera División, one Copa Ibarguren and two Copa Aldao. Liberti carried out bold efforts that contributed to the institutional and sporting greatness of the club. Under his mandate the Estadio Monumental was built, which is currently named after him.

== Biography ==
The son of Genoese immigrants, Liberti held the chairmanship multiple times: initially from 1933–35, in 1939, 1943–52, 1960–64, and finally, 1966-69. The golden era of River Plate is widely attributed to his management, though he also came under criticism for the large sums he devoted towards acquiring foreign players in what in some cases turned out as poor investments. Some of those players were Carlos Peucelle and Bernabé Ferreyra, for whom the club paid m$n 35,000, a huge amount of money for those times.

Liberti's most lasting achievement was arguably his persuading the River Plate directors to purchase a then flood-prone, 84,000 m^{2} (900,000 ft^{2}) lot near the northern end of Buenos Aires' Belgrano neighborhood for the development of a new stadium and other club facilities. Approved in October 1934, and over the objections of many fans and observers, the transaction included land donated by the city, and led to the construction of El Monumental, between 1935 and 1938.

Under Liberti's presidency the club left behind the traditional striped tricolor jersey worn during the 1910s and 1920s, returning to the traditional white with a red band shirt in 1932, the same day that Bernabé Ferreyra debuted in the senior team v Chacarita Juniors. Liberti himself gave the players their shirts before the match. After resigning from his post in 1952, Liberti moved to Italy, the land of his ancestors. Argentine government gave him a charge as honorary consul in Genoa. In 1957 the officials of Torino F.C., team strongly tied by historic ties with River Plate, granted Liberti the title of President of Honor, although he resigned after just six months.He was even appointed, briefly, as the squad's head coach. Liberti had a close relationship with Alberto J. Armando, president of arch-rival Boca Juniors, with whom he agreed on what decades later would be called "football company" or "management" that promoted the football show, an initiative emerged from the demise of the Argentina national team at the 1958 World Cup. River Plate (along with Boca Juniors) hired foreign footballers with the purpose of increasing the level of the local competitions and the attendance to stadiums. One of those players was Uruguayan Roberto Matosas, which River Plate acquired from Peñarol for US$ 250,000, although those acquisitions did not help the club to win more titles.

Liberti died on 28 November 1978. Eight years after his death, the stadium was renamed in his honor.

God didn't give me the chance of having children, but he gave me another one: that place is taken by River.

== See also ==
- Estadio Monumental (Buenos Aires)
