= Villanos (band) =

Argentinian band

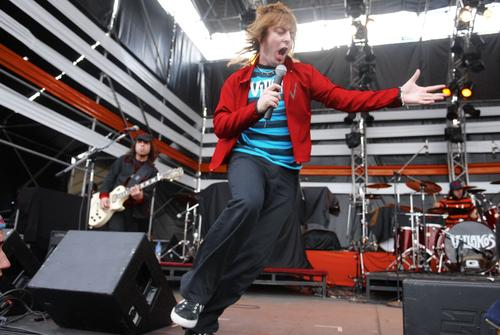

Background information
- Origin: Villa Celina, Argentina
- Genres: punk Rock, Rock and roll, Rocanrol Kabeza
- Years active: 1994–present
- Labels: Kabeza Records
- Members: Niko Villano; Mini Villano; Rene Villano; Lucho Villano
- Website: http://www.villanosalpoder.com.ar/

Villanos is an Argentinian band formed in 1994 in the neighborhood of Villa Celina. It is one of the few bands in Argentina of the punk rock genre – they are also labeled as power pop punk – that has been featured in mainstream radio and television. Villanos has released four official studio albums, two independent albums and a live album.

== History ==
=== Formation ===
Villanos formed in the neighborhood of Villa Celina, a working class district on the outskirts of Buenos Aires, and first played at a bar called Planta Alta in Floresta, Buenos Aires, on April 8, 1995. In January 1996 they made their first trip to the Atlantic coast to play at Villa Gesell. In late 1998 they were elected as one of the groups by the Suplemento Si of Clarín. In early 1999 they recorded their debut album entitled Sacate Todo! in the studio Abasto al Pasto which was produced by Paul Guyot. The album was released independently with distribution by Universal. In April 1999 they were chosen to open the show Kiss in the River Plate Stadium.

Villanos members are:

- Niko Villano (voice and lead guitar)
- René Villano (bass)
- Diego Villano (Guitar)
- Hueso Villano (Drums)

=== No Disparen! ===
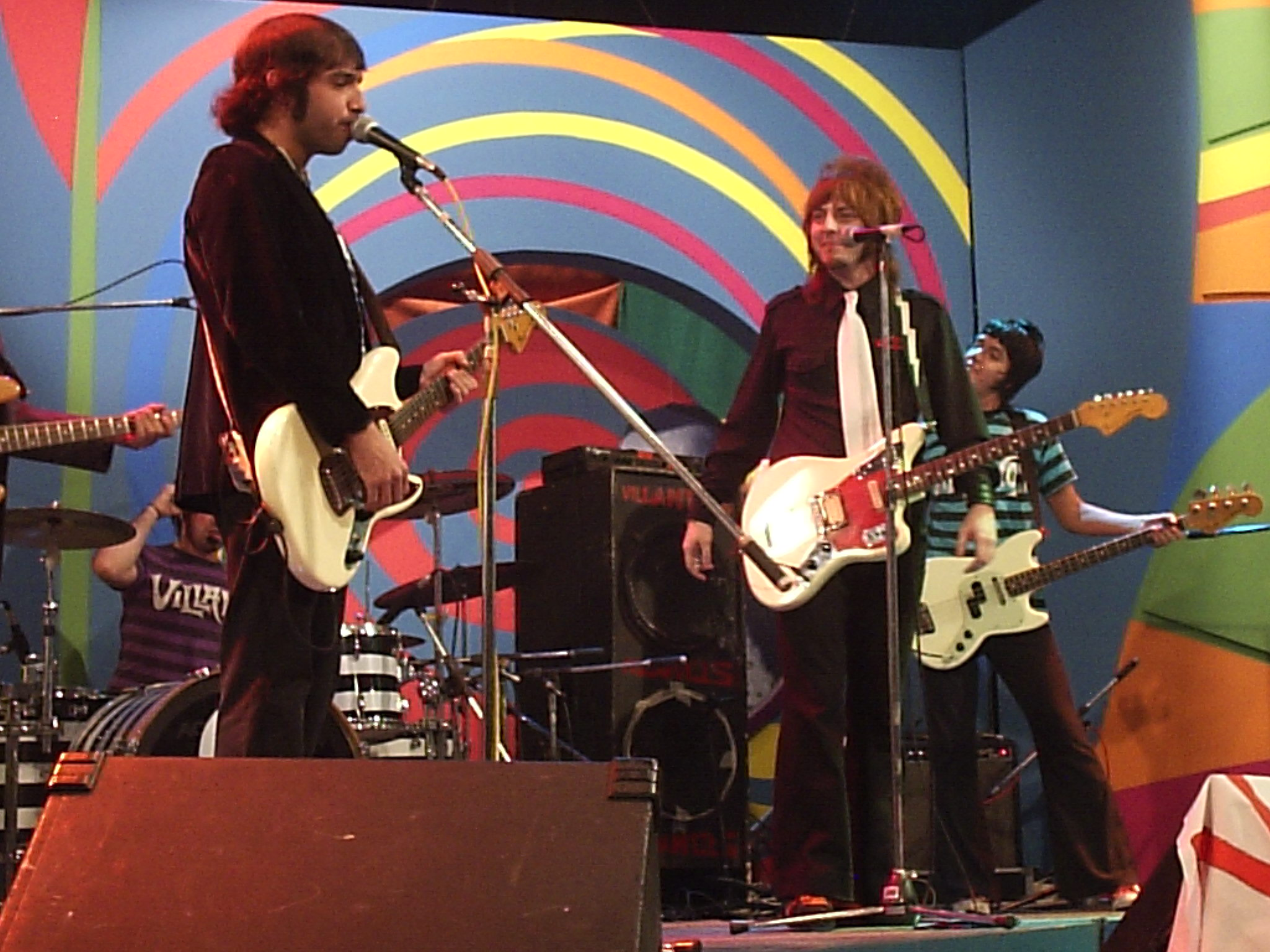
Villanos on Canal 7

In mid-2000 they released their second CD No Disparen!, produced by Paul Guyot and Alfredo Toth, with songs such as "Putas", "No No Disparen" (with Ciro of Attaque 77 as a guest in the video), "Fuera de Moda", and "Hasta la muerte". In September 2000 Villanos were invited by Attaque 77 on their tour around the center and north of the country. In 2001 they released an album of 15 tracks entitled Acusticosas I, recorded live at several night clubs in Buenos Aires including at Niko Villano's birthday party. In 2002 they published Acusticosas II consisting of 20 tracks recorded live at Peteco's in Lomas de Zamora. In May 2004 made Villano al Poder, produced by Niko Villano. The videos for "Digo que Si" and "Dios es Argentino" were both directed by Stephen De Miguel, the producer of Filmic.

=== Superpoderosos! ===
A new album Superpoderosos! was made in December 2004 containing six new songs including "Sin Mi" and "Yo te Doy". The album also included 4 covers: "Te hacen falta vitaminas", "Mi alma lloro", "Si yo soy asi" and "El Señor de Galilea". The new songs were recorded and mixed by Amilcar Gilabert and produced by Niko Villano.

During the same month the video of "Sin Mi" was made with William Constanzo as director on Super 8 at the premises of Parque de la Ciudad. "Sin Mi" climbed to the top of the rankings. During January and February 2005 the toured the Bonaerense Coast and appeared at Gesell Rock in January and Cosquin Rock in February. Warner Bros. Records decided to republish the entire catalog of Villanos and in March 2005 the CD re-issues of Sacate todo! and No Disparen! were remastered by Amilcar Gilabert. The second track "Chau Corazon" gained first place in all television and radio rankings. The video was filmed in the delta of Tigre in Buenos Aires, and it was filmed in style to parody the style of Argentinian film of the 1970s. Throughout 2005 they toured the country in the "Superpoderosa!" Tour.

=== Contacto ===
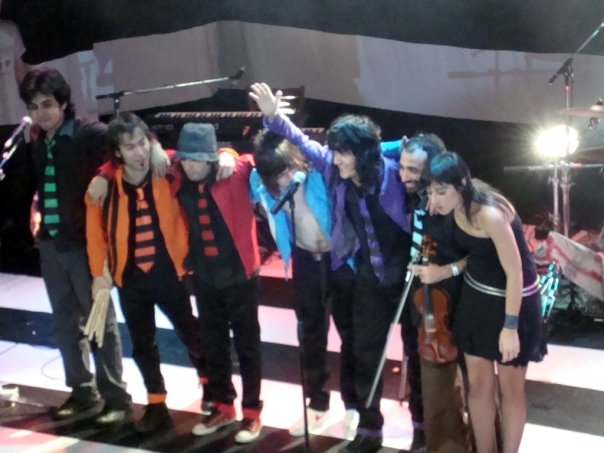
At the official presentation of Acusticosas in ND Ateneo

After a recital given in the Pepsi Music series in 2006 Villanos started work on their next album titled Contacto. This was of 13 songs that revolve around the overdose of information, lack of communication, love, loneliness and freedom. The album included a special bonus track: "Me he quedado solo" by Mexican singer Juan Gabriel. The album was produced by Mauricio Claveria and Sylleros Andres (ex La Ley). The first advance track released, "Contacto", was widely available on radio and TV. The videos for the songs from Contacto were directed by Gabriel Grieco and Niko Villano. The second video was "Me He quedado solo" and Villanos are shown playing with their fans through the streets of La Boca and Gesell ending on Niko calesita perteciente Boulevard in the city.

=== Acusticosas and return to independence ===
2008 was not an easy year for Villanos when they separated from Warner Music Group. They toured cities including Buenos Aires and travelled to Uruguay with the last recitals of the tour Sigo de largo announced at the official presentation and launch of Acusticosas El CD on November 29 in the ND Ateneo. The first video clip from the CD is "Sale Caro", which shows Villanos in the ND Ateneo and the appreciation of their fans.

== Discography ==
=== Studio albums ===
- Sacate Todo! (1999)
- No Disparen! (2000)
- Villanos al Poder! (2004)
- Superpoderosos! (2004)
- Contacto (2007)

=== Acoustic Live albums ===
- Acusticosas (2008)

=== Independent Albums ===
- Acusticosas I (2001)
- Acusticosas II (2002)

== Videography ==
=== DVD ===
- Acusticosas (2009)

=== Conceptual Videos ===
- Sale Caro (1999)
- No Tires Arroz (1999)
- No Disparen! (2000)
- Digo Que Si (2004)
- Dios es Argentino (2004)
- Sin Mi (2004)
- Chau Corazon (2005)
- Llame Ya! (2005)
- Contacto (2007)
- Me he quedado solo (2007)
- Solos y Solos (2008)
- Sale Caro (acoustic) (2008)
- Amor Satelital (acoustic) 2008
