= Santos Inocentes =

Santos Inocentes is an alternative rock band from Argentina, founded by Andres Alberti (younger brother of famed Soda Stereo drummer Charly Alberti), Andres Dussel and Raul Cariola. The group was most active during the late 90s and two years of the 2000s. They were generally tagged under the "sonic" rock movement of mid-decade (like Babasónicos and Juana La Loca), but featured a crunching attack of layered and textured guitars, more angular than other acts in the subgenre. Their second album, Megaton, was the first release of Maverick Musica (the Latin division of Madonna's record label). They took a reprieve in 2001.
