= Los Tipitos =

Musical group of Argentina

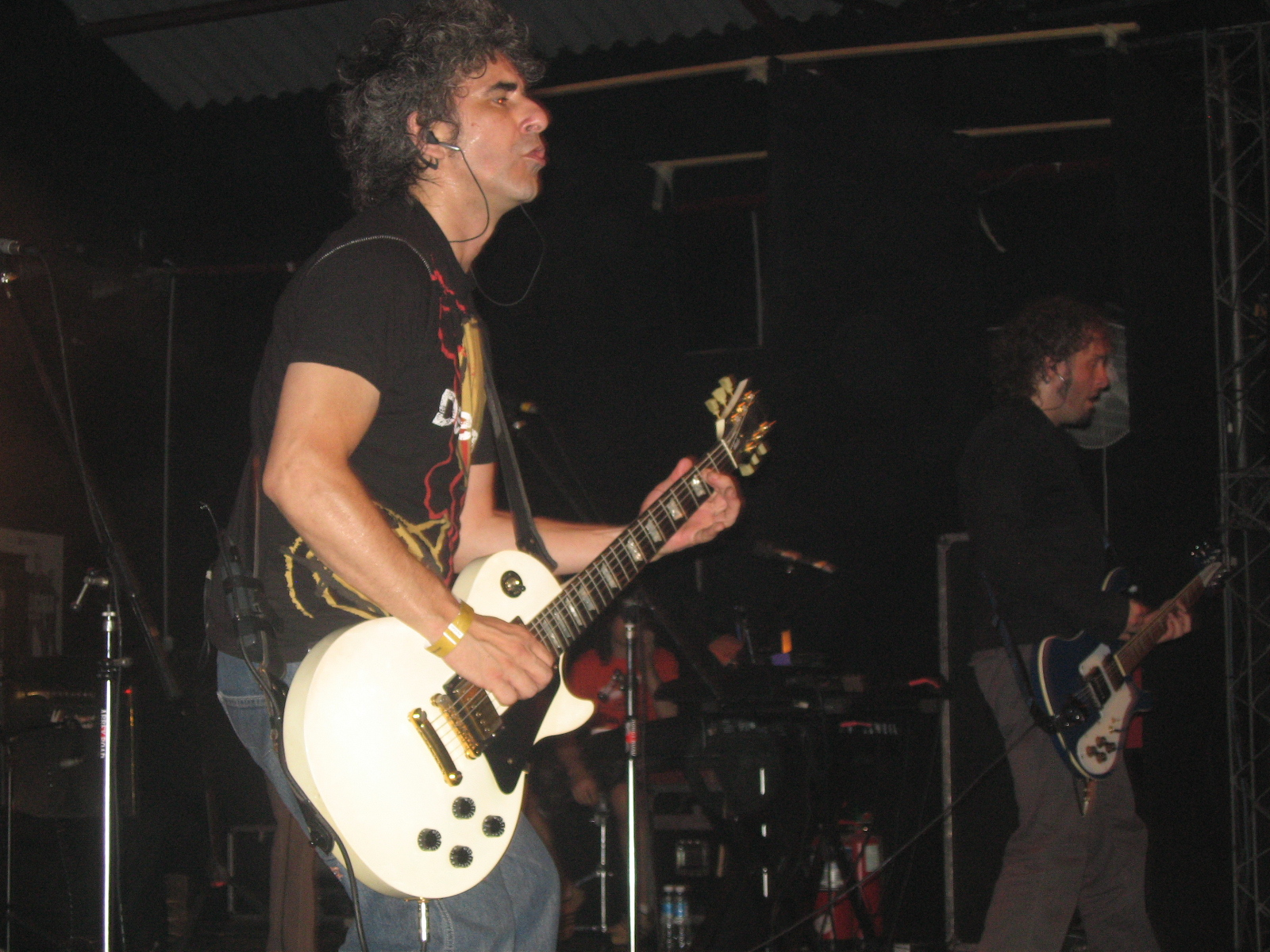
- Raul Ruffino (left) and Walter Piacioli (right), during a concert in 2008.

Background information
- Origin: Mar del Plata, Argentina
- Genres: Rock, Pop
- Years active: 1994-present
- Members: Walter Piancioli; Raúl Ruffino; Federico Bugallo
- Past members: Pablo Tévez
- Website: Los Tipitos

Los Tipitos is a rock band formed in 1994 in the Argentine city of Mar del Plata in the Buenos Aires Province. The band is influenced by important icons of Argentinian rock as Charly García and León Gieco.

== Members ==
- Raúl Ruffino (guitar and voice)
- Federico Bugallo (bass)
- Walter Piancioli (guitar and voice)
- Pablo Tévez (drums)

== Discography ==
=== Studio albums ===
- Los Tipitos (1996)
- Cocrouchis (1999)
- Vintage (2001)
- Armando Camaleón (2004)
- Tan Real (2007)
- El Club de los Martes (2010)
- Push (2013)
- Ojos Tremendos (2016)
- Rock Nacional (2017)
- De Mi Flor (2019)
- Días por Venir (2022)

=== Compilations ===
- Grandes Éxitos (2010)

=== Live Albums ===
- ¿Quién Va a Garpar Todo Esto? (Vol. 1) (1998)
- ¿Quién Va a Garpar Todo Esto? (Vol. 2) (2002)
- Contra los Molinos (2002)
- TipitoRex (2006)

=== Special Albums ===
- Jingle Bells (EP) (1998)
- Primera Grabación (2005)

=== DVD's ===
- TipitoRex DVD (2006)
- Tan Real (Edición CD/DVD) (2007)
