= Catupecu Machu =

Argentine rock band

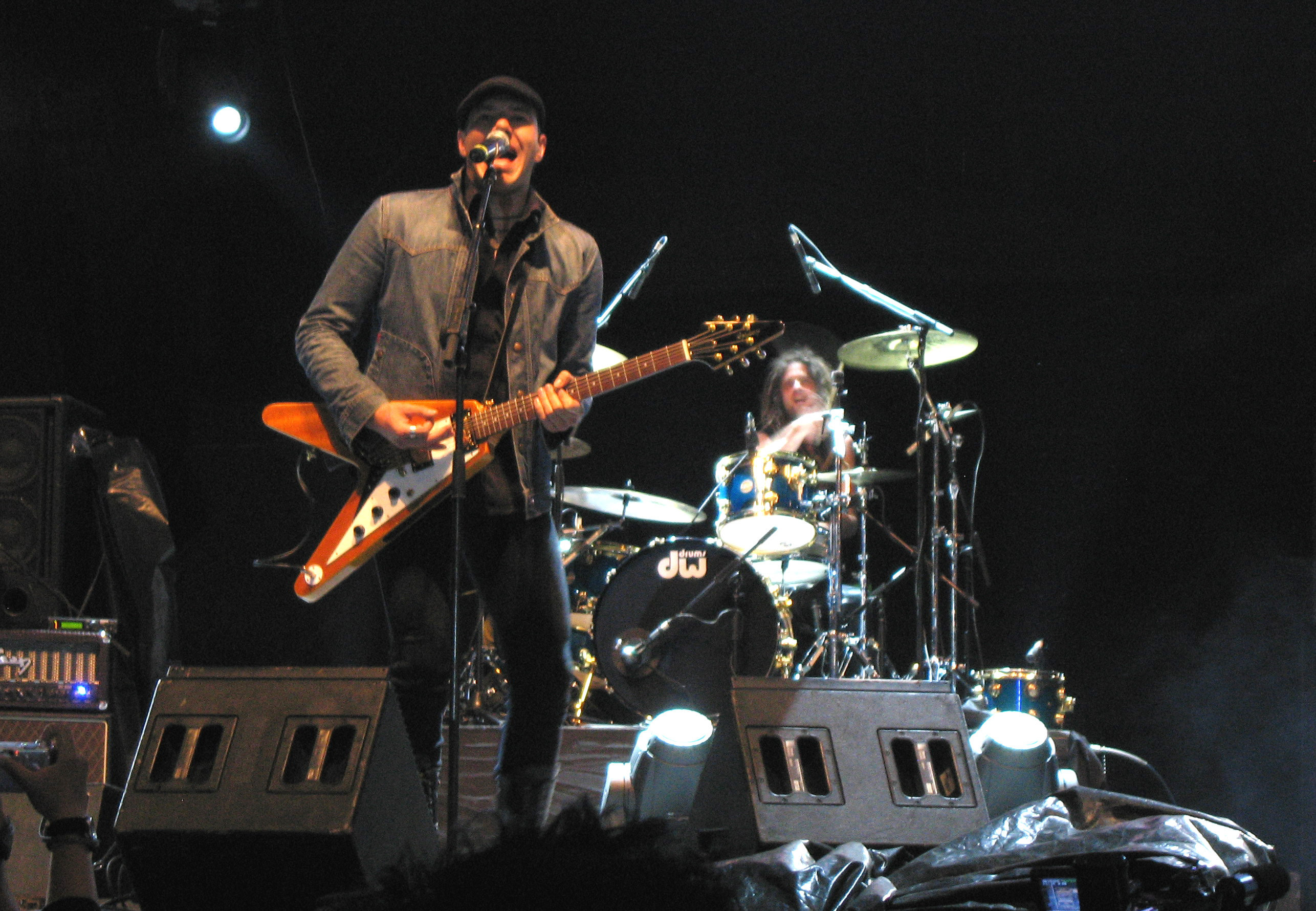

Background information
- Origin: Argentina
- Genres: Alternative metal (early), alternative rock, experimental rock, Argentine rock, industrial rock, funk rock, pop rock, Rock en español
- Years active: 1994–present
- Label: EMI
- Members: Fernando Ruiz Díaz; Charlie Noguera; Agustín Rocino; Macabre González; Julian Gondell
- Past members: Marcelo Baraj; Mariana Baraj; Miguel Sosa; Gabriel Ruiz Díaz †; Zeta Bosio; Javier Herrlein

Catupecu Machu is an Argentine alternative rock band, consisting of Fernando Ruiz Díaz, Gabriel Ruiz Díaz, Miguel Sosa. It is usually classified as within Rock en Español. Its current band members are Fernando Ruiz Díaz on vocals and guitar; Charlie Noguera on bass guitar; Agustín Rocino and Julian Gondell on drums; and Macabre González on keyboards and samplers.

== Biography ==
The band started as a power trio in the Villa Luro neighborhood, Buenos Aires, in 1994. It all started when the Ruiz brothers decided to establish a band. As music lovers they already knew how to play the guitar and bass. All they needed was a drummer, so they recruited Marcelo Baraj (who currently plays in Totus Toss). With this first line-up they started playing in the underground concerts of Buenos Aires (performing in the Arlequines theatre), followed by shows around the country.

During the following years, they played the “Nuevo Rock” (New Rock) festival of Córdoba (1997), where the press identified them as the next big thing, and also played in the “Monsters of Rock” festival (1998), opening for Almafuerte, Sepultura, and Metallica at Buenos Aires' River Plate Stadium. In 1997, the group founded their own label to make their début album, entitled Dale!. During this period, drummer Marcelo Baraj was replaced by Miguel Sosa, who was only sixteen years old at that time.

Tired of having their shows being bootlegged, they decided to record their second album, A Morir (recorded live in Cemento), which included songs from the previous album and four new tracks (Heroes Anonimos, Testigo Criminal, Cuantos Son and El Rostro). It started selling in mid-October 1998, increasing their reputation.

In the year 2000, they recorded their third album, titled Cuentos Decapitados, produced by EMI-Odeon and edited in New York City which, as a record, showed the band's newfound maturity, as well as great lyrical improvement. This album was popular both with the public and critics, containing tracks such as Y lo que quiero es que pises sin el suelo, Entero o a Pedazos and Eso Vive. The music video for Y lo que quiero es que pises sin el suelo, directed by Gianfranco Quatrini, obtained an MTV Award for Best Latin Video of the Year 2001, chosen by the public. Thanks to this, they were able to edit it in Puerto Rico and United States through EMI Latin, and start a two-month tour throughout the island, playing at “Festival Rock a Tour”.

In December 2001, the band performed at Arena Obras Sanitarias, a legendary venue for high-ranked artists, sometimes called “The Temple of National Rock." This same show was transmitted several times on MTV and live via the Rock & Pop radio station. In May, the following year, this show was edited and officially launched on DVD under the title Eso vive, which included intimate things about the band, famous songs and the video Y lo que quiero es que pises sin el suelo. They were also the first Argentine band to release a DVD. After the show at Obras, the band started a tour playing around Argentina, with other performances in Uruguay, Paraguay and United States, playing in the MTV Awards in Miami (2002), and a promotional tour through the city of Los Angeles, California (2003).

During a peak in the band's popularity, drummer Miguel “Abril” Sosa decided to leave to form a group called Cuentos Borgeanos. He was replaced by Javier Herrlein, an old friend of the group, who collaborated with them in songs such as La Polca playing the accordion, and played as a drummer long before the band had a name.

In 2002, the band released their fourth album, titled Cuadros dentro de cuadros, in which they experimented with computer-generated sounds. For this record the band went to a big country house, where they set up the recording studios with three rooms for each member of the band. The whole record was arranged into separate sections.

During 2003, for the fourth time, the band played their regular concerts with “Surround Sound 5.1," in which the whole audio system is strategically positioned around the venue. This created a unique experience for the public. Catupecu Machu was the first band in the world to use this system in concerts.

In November 2004, the band released their fifth album, titled El Número Imperfecto and recorded in Panda Studios, Espacio Studio, Labardén Studio and Club Audio of Buenos Aires with editing enhancement by Tom Baker of Precision Mastering, Los Angeles, California. In this recording, the group integrated a fourth member to the band, Macabre (Martín Gonzalez) on keyboards and samplers. This album includes eleven songs and an interactive track to access the band’s website.

In August 2005, the band participated in the LAMC (Latin Alternative Music Conference) hosted in New York City as one of the main bands. Subsequent performances in New York with a spectacular concert show which demonstrated that Catupecu Machu was a band with major international potential. After this trip, MTV produced the “Diary of Catupecu Machu," shown in different countries across Latin America. In November 2005 Catupecu Machu was nominated for Best Rock Group and Best Artist of the South in the MTV Video Music Awards Latin America.

On March 31, 2006, Gabriel Ruíz Díaz crashed his car into a tree. He suffered severe head trauma and loss of brain mass. After some days in the Intermediate Care Unit, Gabriel was moved to the Fleni rehabilitation centre in the city of Escobar on October 10. Contrary to what some media outlets said, both people in the car were wearing their safety belts. The passenger in the car was Cabezones singer César Andino, who suffered two broken femurs, one of them an open fracture. He is now recovering positively after several surgical procedures.

Fernando Ruiz Díaz, Macabre and Javier Herrlein launched in 2007 Laberintos entre aristas y dialectos ("Labyrinths between edges and dialects"), a double album presented in two chapters. Chapter 1 is called Tratado de la materia en estudio ("Treatment on matter at the studio") and it includes three new songs ("El viaje del miedo","Dialecto" and "Foto en blanco y negro ") and three new versions of existing songs ("Magia veneno", "Grandes esperanzas", and "El lugar").

The second chapter is called Registro de la materia en concierto ("Recordings of live material"), and it includes recordings made by the band during the special shows they were giving, including their most famous songs but arranged with violin, cello, and viola sections.

Sebastian Caceres replaced Gabriel Ruiz Diaz as bassist/guitarist.

This album took the band to new venues, mainly Buenos Aires theaters, with the band aiming for a bohemian and quiet type of show, uncommon with the band until then.

Agustín Rocino took over Javier Herrlein's role as drummer.

=== Appearances ===
Catupecu Machu has performed in major events of Latin rock including: Vive Latino (Mexico), Rock Al Parque (Colombia), Fashionista MTV (Mexico) and Vive Latino 07 (Chile) and they are a regular band in the main Argentine concerts Quilmes Rock (Rosario, Mendoza, Buenos Aires), Pepsi Rock, Cosquin Rock, La Falda Rock, Gesell Rock, Creamfields, San Pedro Rock, Mendoza Rock and others.

=== About the name Catupecu Machu ===
According to an interview with the newspaper Clarín, the name originated in high school, while trying to make up answers in a Geography test. It was a name they gave to a made-up animal that lived in Africa.

== Band members ==
=== Current members ===
- Fernando Ruiz Díaz – vocals, guitar, bass (1994–present)
- Agustín Rocino – drums (2011–present)
- Martín «Macabre» González – keyboards, bass, backing vocals (2001–present)
- Sebastián Cáceres – bass, guitar (2007–present)

=== Past members ===
- Gabriel Ruiz Díaz – bass, guitar, backing vocals (1994–2006)
- Abril Sosa – drums (1995–2001)
- Marcelo Baraj – drums (1994–1995)
- Mariana Baraj – percussion (1994–1995)
- Gustavo Bilbao – keyboards, guitar (2000–2001)
- Zeta Bosio – bass (2006–2007)
- Esteban "Pichu" Serniotti – guitar (2006–2007)
- Javier Herrlein – drums (1994, 2002–2011)

== Discography ==
- Dale! (1997)
- A Morir (1998)
- Cuentos Decapitados (2000)
- Cuadros Dentro de Cuadros (2002)
- El Número Imperfecto (2004)
- Laberintos Entre Aristas y Dialectos (2007)
- Simetría de Moebius (2009)
- El Mezcal y la Cobra (2011)
- El grito después: Breviario de anomalías(2014)
- El grito después: Código genético (2014)

== Awards and mentions ==
- ”Best Albums of the year 2000”, for “Cuentos Decapitados”, Rolling Stone Argentina magazine.
- “Best Band of Rock Argentino 2001”, Clarín Award.
- “Best Senior Band of 2001”, Rolling Stone Argentina magazine.
- “Artist of the Year” and “Best Band of the Year”, people’s choice in “Rolling Stone Music Awards”, 2002.
- “Best Rock Album by the Critics”, “Rolling Stone Argentina Music Awards”, 2003.

For the video “Y lo que quiero es que pises sin el suelo”:

- “Video de la Gente” (MTV Latin America International Viewer's Choice — South), at the 2001 MTV Video Music Awards, people’s choice, 2001.
- “Best Video of 2000”, people’s choice, by the “Si” supplement, in Clarín.
- “Best Video”, voted by the critics and readers of Rolling Stone Argentina magazine, Music Awards, 2001.
