= Ratones Paranoicos =

Argentine rock band

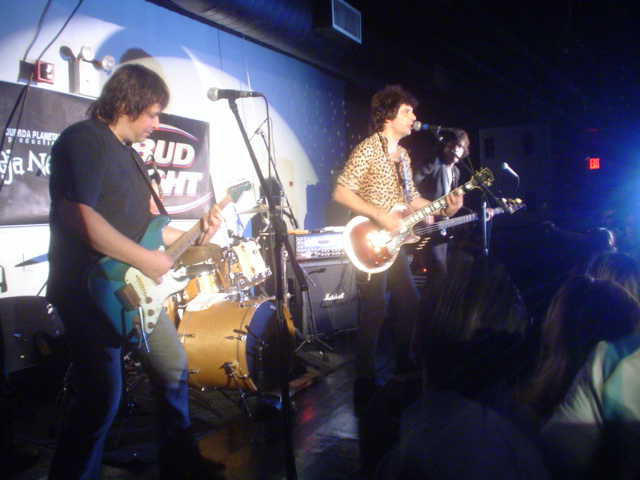
- Ratones Paranoicos in 2007

Background information
- Genres: Rock and roll
- Years active: 1983–2011; 2017–present
- Members: Juanse Gutiérrez; Pablo "Maldito" Memi; Paul "Sarcófago" Cano; Rubén "Roy" Quiroga
- Past members: Fabián "Von" Quintiero
- Website: www.losratonesweb.com.ar

Ratones Paranoicos (English: Paranoid Mice) is an Argentine rock band, formed in 1983 in Buenos Aires, Argentina. The group is influenced by rhythm and blues music, and their prime influence were the Rolling Stones, with whom they have shared Andrew Loog Oldham as a producer.

== Members ==
It was originally formed by Juanse Gutiérrez (vocals and guitar), Pablo "Maldito" Memi (bass), Paul "Sarcófago" Cano (guitar) and Rubén "Roy" Quiroga (drums). In October 2007, Fabian "Von" Quintiero split from the band after being a member since 1997. In his place came Pablo Memi, returning to the original line-up. The band was once supported by Charly García. Former Rolling Stones guitarist Mick Taylor has appeared with them.

== Discography ==
- Ratones Paranoicos (1986)
- Los chicos quieren rock (1988)
- Furtivos (1989)
- Tómalo o déjalo (1990)
- Fieras lunáticas (1991)
- Hecho en Memphis (1993)
- Planeta Paranoico (1996)
- Electroshock (1999)
- Los chicos quieren más (2001)
- Girando (2003)
- Ratones Paranoicos (2009)

== See also ==
- Argentine rock
