= Massacre (Argentine band) =

Argentinian rock band

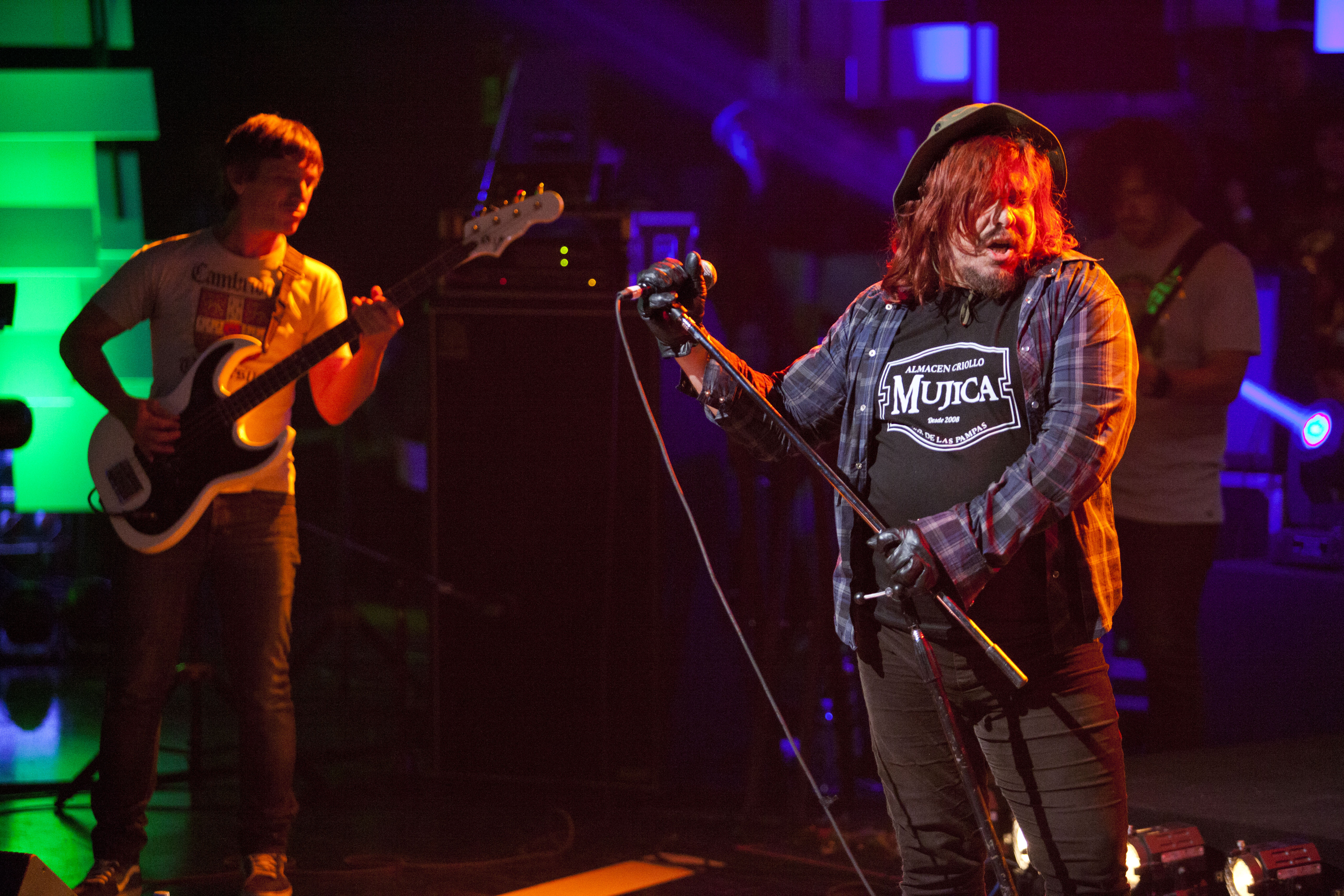
- Massacre in 2014

Background information
- Also known as: Massacre Palestina (early)
- Origin: Buenos Aires, Argentina
- Genres: Punk rock (early); hardcore punk (early); skate punk (early); Argentine rock; alternative rock; indie rock; noise pop; grunge
- Years active: 1986–present
- Members: Guillermo "Walas" Cidade (voice); Pablo Mondello (guitar); Luciano Facio (bass); Carlos Camota (drums); Federico Piskorz (rhythm guitar)
- Past members: Francisco Ruiz Ferreyra (drums); José "Topo" Armetta (bass); Ricardo Serafini (voice)

Massacre is an Argentine alternative rock band formed in 1986 in Buenos Aires. It was formed by high school students influenced by American and British bands of the early 80s alternative rock movement. Among his influences, artists like Hüsker Dü, TSOL, Dead Kennedys, Black Flag, Nirvana, the Cure, Guns N' Roses, the Ramones, T. Rex, Sumo, Gustavo Cerati, Luis Alberto Spinetta, among others. Taking cues from the Underground rock scene in the United States, they gained notoriety at the time for being an entirely independent group that self-managed its affairs, as well as producing and distributing its own records (attitudes which were still fairly foreign to Latin American rock bands of the era). This helped pave way for the cult status that the band still enjoys within and outside their native Argentina.

Originally known as Massacre Palestina, they decided to change their name in 1992, in the wake of the attack on the Embassy of Israel, in order to avoid potential censure and controversy.

== Discography ==
Year	Album	Disc type
1992	Sol Lucet Omnibus	Studio albums
1994	Galería desesperanza	Studio albums
1996	Juguetes para olvidar	Studio albums
1998	Aerial	Studio albums
2003	12 nuevas patologías	Studio albums
2007	El mamut	Studio albums
2011	Ringo	Studio albums
2015	Biblia Ovni	Studio albums
2024	Nueve	Studio albums
1987	Massacre Palestina	Extended play
1995	L'Alma Occulta	Extended play
2001	Fue una suerte...	Extended play
2005	Diferentes maneras	Live album
2000	Singles, covers y rarities	Compilation album

== See also ==
- Latino punk
