= Pequeñas anécdotas sobre las instituciones =

Studio album by Sui Generis
- Released: 16 December 1974
- Recorded: 1974
- Genre: Progressive rock, progressive folk
- Length: 40:26; 48:24 (1994 remastered version)
- Label: Talent
- Producer: Charly García, Jorge Álvarez

Sui Generis chronology
Confesiones de Invierno (1973)	Pequeñas anécdotas sobre las instituciones (1974)	Adiós Sui Generis (Live) (1975)

Pequeñas anécdotas sobre las instituciones (Little Anecdotes About the Institutions) is the third album by Argentine group Sui Generis, released in 1974 by the Talent label.

A concept album, it was originally meant to be titled "Instituciones" (Institutions), but Sui Generis' producer suggested them to change the title to "Pequeñas anécdotas sobre las instituciones" (Little Anecdotes About the Institutions), reflecting the repressive nature of the Argentine (and Western in general) social and political institutions at the time, as they were perceived by the 60s and 70s generation.

== Details ==
Charly García's concept was to write a song about every influential and traditional institution, including the Catholic Church, the government, the family, the judicial system, the police, the army, and so on. Two tracks, "Juan Represión" ("Repression John") about the police, as well as "Botas locas" (Crazy Boots) about the army, were removed from the album by the record label (Talent Microfón), who was concerned about government censorship and the growing social and political violence in Argentina at the time.

Other tracks had to be partly changed, including "Las increíbles aventuras del Señor Tijeras" (The Amazing Adventures of Mr. Scissors) about film censorship, "¿Para quién canto yo entonces?" (Whom Am I Singing for Then?) also about censorship, and "Música de fondo para cualquier fiesta animada" (Background Music for Any Lively Party) showcasing judges and political corruption, which had to be completely rewritten. These were not protest songs but symphonic / prog rock tunes with lyrics that mixed everyday language and scenes with highly imaginative and surrealist vocabulary and imagery, as showcased on the front jacket, where several of the songs are represented in a vignette (designed by the graphic artist Juan O. Gatti, who had illustrated the band's previous album).

Exceptions were "Botas locas" (about mandatory military service) and "Juan Represion", both having direct lyrics and a simpler folk style that linked them with the band's earlier productions, and were not included in the original release as mentioned, nor in the cover illustrations.

When first released, the album wasn't welcomed by the audience as its two predecessors had been because of its progressive rock orientation, something that didn't suit well at the time with a majority of fans, who were expecting more of the band's trademark youthful anthems. With the passing of time, it would inspire new generations of Argentine musicians and become a classic in its own right. In 2007, the Argentine edition of the Rolling Stone magazine ranked it 31st on its list of The 100 Greatest Albums of Argentine Rock.

== Track listing ==
All songs written by Charly García, except where noted.

Side One

1. "Instituciones" (Institutions) - 4:50
2. "Tango en segunda" (Tango in second [gear]) - 3:32
3. "El show de los muertos" (The Show of The Dead) - 6:04
4. "Las increíbles aventuras del Señor Tijeras" (The Amazing Adventures of Mr. Scissors) - 5:51

Side Two

1. "Pequeñas delicias de la vida conyugal" (Little Delights of Marital Life) - 3:38
2. "El tuerto y los ciegos" (The One-Eyed and the Blind) - 2:02
3. "Música de fondo para cualquier fiesta animada" (Background Music for Any Lively Party) - 4:32
4. "Tema de Natalio" (Natalio's Song) (García-Rafanelli) - 6:00
5. "Para quién canto yo entonces" (Whom Am I Singing for Then?) - 3:42

Bonus tracks on 1994 remastered version released by (Sony Music).

1. "Juan Represión" ("Repression John") - 3:25
2. "Botas locas" (Crazy Boots) - 4:58

== Album credits ==
=== The group ===
- Charly García – piano, electric piano, mini Moog, clavinet, ARP String Ensemble, electric guitar, vocals
- Nito Mestre – acoustic guitar, recorder, vocals
- Rinaldo Rafanelli – bass, electric guitar, vocals
- Juan Rodríguez – drums, percussion

=== Guests ===
- David Lebón – electric guitar
- Alejandro Correa (músico) – bass
- Carlos Cutaia – organ
- Jorge Pinchevsky – violin
- León Gieco – harmonica
- Oscar Moro – drums
- María Rosa Yorio – chorus
- Billy Bond – chorus

=== Production ===
- Producer: Jorge Álvarez
- Engineer: Billy Bond
