= Clics modernos =

1983 album by Charly García

Studio album by Charly García
- Released: November 5, 1983
- Recorded: 1983
- Studios: Electric Lady Studios, New York, Cherokee Studios and the Room, Los Angeles
- Genres: New wave; pop rock; synthpop
- Length: 34:29
- Labels: Interdisc; SG Discos
- Producers: Charly García; Joe Blaney

Charly García chronology
Yendo de la cama al living (1982)	Clics modernos (1983)	Piano Bar (1984)

Singles from Clics modernos
- 1. "No Me Dejan Salir" Released: 1983; 2. "Nos Siguen Pegando Abajo" Released: 1984

Clics modernos (pronounced [kliks moˈðeɾnos]; Spanish for "modern clicks") is the second solo studio album by the Argentine musician Charly García, released on November 5, 1983, on SG Discos and Interdisc. Recorded largely at Electric Lady Studios in New York while Argentina moved out of seven years of a military dictatorship, the album replaced the guitar-driven rock of García's earlier projects with drum machines, synthesizers and early sampling technology, and is regarded as a decisive work in the evolution of Spanish-language rock.

Although initial reaction to García's turn away from overt protest rock and toward new wave sounds was more divided than its later reputation suggests, Clics modernos has since come to be widely regarded as García's finest work. It was ranked at number two in the Argentine edition of Rolling Stone's list of The 100 Greatest Albums of National Rock, number nine in the American edition of Rolling Stones 2023 list of the 50 Best Latin American Rock Albums, and number six in Los 600 de Latinoamérica, a 2024 ranking of the 600 greatest Latin American albums by critics and academics. For the album's 40th anniversary in 2023, the New York street corner where its cover photograph was taken was renamed "Charly García Corner".

== Background ==
Serú Girán, the band García had led since the late 1970s with David Lebón, Pedro Aznar and Oscar Moro, came to an end when Aznar left Argentina to study music in Berkeley, California. García shortly after launched his solo career, writing, arranging and producing his debut solo album, Yendo de la cama al living (1982), by himself in Buenos Aires under the shadow of the Falklands War, a conflict obliquely addressed on tracks such as "No Bombardeen Buenos Aires" and "Inconsciente colectivo".

After touring Argentina for the first time as a solo artist with new manager Daniel Grinbank, García left the country for New York in early 1983, eager to distance himself from Buenos Aires, which he later described as "suffocating him". He settled into a loft in Greenwich Village to write and record a follow-up. Aznar, coincidentally, was in New York at the same time performing as bassist in the Pat Metheny Group, and rejoined García for the new sessions.

== Recording ==
García and Aznar approached Electric Lady Studios, the studio Jimi Hendrix had built in Greenwich Village, and were paired with staff engineer Joe Blaney, who had begun his career engineering for the British punk band the Clash and would go on to work with Prince, Keith Richards and, years later, another Argentine musician, Andrés Calamaro. Working from a set of songs García had already demoed in Argentina, the pair began rerecording and reshaping the material.

García later recalled that the duo had originally planned to record the album with a session drummer, but abandoned the idea after a single unsatisfactory day in the studio; the next day he instead programmed a Roland TR-808 drum machine, the same model he had used on parts of Yendo de la cama al living, for "Nos Siguen Pegando Abajo", and the rest of the record's rhythmic backbone followed from there. Session drummer Casey Scheuerell nonetheless contributed acoustic and Simmons electronic drums to several tracks, and session guitarist Larry Carlton—known for his work with Steely Dan and Joni Mitchell—added guitar to three of the songs.

One of the first songs to be worked on, "No Me Dejan Salir", incorporated a sampled vocal shout from James Brown's "Hot Pants", an early instance of sample-based production on a Spanish-language rock record. Recording made use of newly available technology, including an E-mu Emulator sampler and a Roland Jupiter-6 synthesizer, alongside the TR-808. Some further sessions and the album's mixing took place at Cherokee Studios and the Room in Los Angeles, and the record was mastered by Ted Jensen.

== Composition ==
Musically, Clics modernos represents García's immersing himself in new wave, with a significant use of synthesizers and samplers largely displacing conventional rock instrumentation. Lyrically, the album keeps the political undercurrent of García's earlier work but filters it through a more sardonic and elliptical humor, reflecting a country still reckoning with the trauma of the dictatorship even as democratic elections approached. The opening track, "Nos Siguen Pegando Abajo (Pecado Mortal)"—originally titled simply "Pecado Mortal" until the performing-rights society SADAIC required a change of title, a decision García has said he never fully accepted—pairs an upbeat new-wave arrangement with lyrics about state violence against a young couple, widely read as commentary on repression both in daily life and at rock concerts. "No Me Dejan Salir" depicts a narrator paralyzed by claustrophobia and unable to fully feel or love, a theme often interpreted as a metaphor for both personal confinement and Argentina's own delayed emergence from military rule.

"Los Dinosaurios" in side two presents the image of dinosaurs as the only creatures immune to disappearing—a line understood as an allusion to the thousands of people forcibly disappeared under the dictatorship. García has named it among his own favorite compositions. Rolling Stone's 2023 retrospective on the album singled out the opening track as a pointed condemnation of dictatorial oppression, described "No Soy un Extraño" as drifting into a tango-inflected synth-pop atmosphere, and noted that on "Los Dinosaurios" García sounds happier than anywhere else on the record even as he addresses the end of tyranny.

== Artwork ==
The album's cover photograph, taken by Uberto Sagramoso, shows García as a black silhouette against a mural in New York's Tribeca neighborhood by the street artist Richard Hambleton, known for his "Shadowman" figures, painted alongside the stenciled words "Modern Clix"—an English rendering of the album's Spanish title. Inner-sleeve photography was credited to Ada Moreno. In 2023, on the album's 40th anniversary, the corner where the photograph was taken, at Walker Street and Cortlandt Alley, was renamed "Charly García Corner" in a project led by Argentine expatriate Mariano Cabrera with support from the New York's Argentine consulate and the city of New York; the ceremony included a plaque unveiling and a short concert by musicians who had played in García's touring bands over the years, even though the original building at the site had since become a hotel.

== Release and promotion ==
Clics modernos was released on November 5, 1983, on Interdisc and SG Discos—five days after Argentina's first presidential election since the return of civilian rule and around a month before president-elect Raúl Alfonsín took office, timing García later pointed to in describing the record as effectively his first album made for a democratic Argentina.

García presented the album between December 15 and 18, 1983, at Luna Park Stadium in Buenos Aires. The concerts featured keyboardist Fito Páez, backing vocalist Fabiana Cantilo, drummer Willy Iturri, bassist Alfredo Toth, guitarist Pablo Guyot and saxophonists Gonzalo Palacios and Daniel Melingo. The specialized magazine Pelo praised the shows as "captivating" and named them among the best of the year. "No Me Dejan Salir" was also issued as a single in Ecuador in 1984 through WEA Music and Famoso.

Tracks such as "Plateado sobre plateado (huellas en el mar)" had already been debuted live in early 1983 during a series of concerts at the Estadio Obras Sanitarias. The subsequent tour extended into Chile, Uruguay and Peru through 1984 and was, by later accounts, marked by friction between García and segments of an audience still adjusting to the album's new-wave sound; the alienation García felt during this period would be addressed directly on "Demoliendo Hoteles", the opening track of his following album, Piano Bar (1984).

== Reception ==
Contemporary reception to Clics modernos was more divided than its later reputation would suggest: García's shift away from the guitar-driven, explicitly political rock of Serú Girán toward a synthesizer-and-drum-machine record built for dancing puzzled part of his existing audience. In the decades since, critical opinion has moved decisively in the album's favor. In 2008, Rolling Stone Argentina described it as widely considered García's best album, one that found him working at an especially high creative level. Revisiting the record on its 40th anniversary, PopMatters called it a fascinating high point in Latin rock history and one of the standout achievements of García's career, while noting that its post-modern reinvention had initially unsettled fans expecting more of his earlier protest-song style. In Los 600 de Latinoamérica (2024), critic José Juan Zapata framed the album as offering its own distinctive way of understanding Latin American rock, one that balances tension between the political and the personal, and between Anglo-American sounds and local color.

== Legacy ==
Clics modernos was ranked number two, behind only Pescado Rabioso's Artaud, in both the original 2007 edition and the revised 2013 edition of Rolling Stone Argentina's 100 Greatest Albums of National Rock; uniquely among the albums on that list, García himself, rather than a journalist, wrote the entry accompanying it. In September 2023, the American edition of Rolling Stone ranked it ninth on a list of the 50 Best Latin American Rock Albums compiled by critic Ernesto Lechner, describing the record as marking rock en español's full transition into taut new wave.

That same year, an online tournament run by the website The Greatest Album, which pitted 256 albums against one another across more than 60,000 votes, crowned Clics modernos the best new wave album ever, with the record eliminating albums by David Bowie and the Cure before topping Talking Heads' Remain in Light in the final round.

For the album's 40th anniversary in November 2023, tributes were staged in Mendoza, and in New York, where the corner featured on the cover was renamed "Charly García Corner". In early 2026, more than four decades after its original release, Clics modernos returned to number one on Argentina's weekly national albums sales chart, tracked by Diario de Cultura using data from the Argentine Chamber of Phonograms and Videograms Producers (CAPIF).

=== Accolades ===
Publication	Country	Accolade	Year	Rank
Al Borde	United States	The 250 Most Important Latin Rock Albums	2006	3
Rolling Stone	Argentina	100 Greatest Albums of National Rock	2007	2
Switch	Mexico	The 100 Best Albums of the 20th Century	1999	*
(*) designates list that is unordered.
Rolling Stone	United States	The 50 Best Latin American Rock Albums	2023	9
Los 600 de Latinoamérica	Latin America	600 Discos de Latinoamérica 1920-2022	2024	6

== Track listing ==
All tracks are written by Charly García.

Side one
No.	Title	Length
1.	"Nos Siguen Pegando Abajo"	3:30
2.	"No Soy un Extraño"	3:18
3.	"Dos Cero Uno (Transas)"	2:09
4.	"Nuevos Trapos"	4:08
5.	"Bancate Ese Defecto"	4:56

Side two
No.	Title	Length
6.	"No Me Dejan Salir"	4:21
7.	"Los Dinosaurios"	3:28
8.	"Plateado Sobre Plateado (Huellas en el Mar)"	5:02
9.	"Ojos de Video Tape"	3:37
Total length:		34:29

== Personnel ==
Credits adapted from Clics modernos' liner notes, with additional recording details from contemporary and retrospective sources.

- Charly García – writer, producer, mixer, vocals, keyboards, sampler, drum machine, groovebox, effects, electric guitar
- Larry Carlton – guitar on "No Soy Un Extraño", "Los Dinosaurios", "Plateado Sobre Plateado (Huellas En El Mar)"
- Pedro Aznar – fretless bass guitar (all tracks except "Nuevos Trapos"), vocals and guitar on "Nos Siguen Pegando Abajo"
- Casey Scheuerell – drums on "Bancate Ese Defecto", "No Me Dejan Salir", "Plateado Sobre Plateado", Simmons drums on "Nos Siguen Pegando Abajo", "No Me Dejan Salir", tabla on "Dos Cero Uno"
- Doug Norwine – saxophone on "Nuevos Trapos"
- Joe Blaney – engineer, mixing
- Ted Jensen – mastering
- Daniel Goldberg – producer assistant
- Carlos Pirín Geniso – producer assistant
- Don Koldom – auxiliary engineer
- Hal Sacks – auxiliary engineer
- Uberto Sagramoso – cover photography
- Ada Moreno – inner booklet photography

== Charts ==
Chart (2026)	Peak position
Argentine Albums (CAPIF)	1

== Bibliography ==
- Ortelli, Juan (2016). "Charly Garía: La guía definitiva". Rolling Stone (in Spanish) (1st ed.). Buenos Aires, Argentina: S.A. La Nación. ISBN 978-987-4089-01-4.
- Plotkin, Pablo (2010). "Capítulo 1: Charly García". Leyendas del rock nacional (in Spanish) (1st ed.). Buenos Aires, Argentina: S.A. La Nación. pp. 9–16. ISBN 978-987-1690-01-5.
