= Nito Mestre =

Argentine musician (born 1952)

Carlos Alberto Mestre
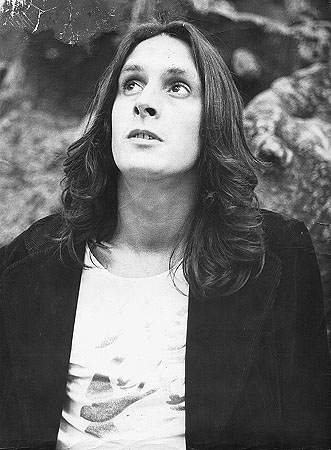
- Mestre in 1975

Background information
- Born: August 3, 1952 (age 74)
- Origin: Buenos Aires, Argentina
- Genres: Folk rock, rock
- Occupations: Musician, singer-songwriter
- Instruments: Vocals, guitar, flute
- Years active: 1969–present

Carlos Alberto Mestre (born August 3, 1952 in Buenos Aires, Argentina) mostly known by his stage name Nito Mestre, is an Argentine musician, founding member –along with Charly García– of Sui Generis, member of PorSuiGieco, bandleader of Nito Mestre y los Desconocidos de Siempre and a recording solo artist. Sui Generis, was initially formed in 1969 by Charly García (keyboards and vocals), Nito Mestre (guitar, flute and vocals), Rolando Fortich (bass guitar Liam Young (guitar), Alberto Rodriguez (drums) and Carlos Piegari (vocals). Later on, Sui Generis became a duo as everyone left except for García. After the band split in 1975, Nito Mestre formed a new band called "Nito Mestre y los Desconocidos de Siempre" with María Rosa Yorio on vocals, Rodolfo Gorosito on guitar, Alfredo Toth on bass, Ciro Fogliatta on keyboards and Juan Carlos "Mono" Fontana as a drummer. In the early 80s, Nito pursued a solo career.

== Biography ==
=== Early years ===
Throughout its five years of existence, Sui Generis sold a record 600,000 albums, a statistic which in those early days of rock and roll in Argentina, clearly marked the importance and the impact which the duo would have on the local scene. Initially formed in 1969, the band consisted of Charly García (keyboards and vocals), Nito Mestre (guitar, flute and vocals), Rolando Fortich (bass guitar), Juan Belia (guitar), Alberto Rodríguez (drums) and Carlos Piégari (vocals).

Charly and Nito had met during their third year at high school. They both had their own bands: Charly, together with Rodríguez and Correa, had formed "To Walk a Spanish" and Nito, together with Piégari, formed and was the lead singer in "The Century Indignation".

As a sextet, the band made its debut on the stage of the Santa Rosa School in Buenos Aires in 1969, but the group would undergo many changes until it finally became an acoustic duet. In 1970, they performed at a series of small venues and that same year, they made their first TV appearance on Channel 7, endorsed by Eduardo Falú. Soon after, they traveled to Mar del Plata where they co-started with songwriter Litto Nebbia.

In May 1971, they took part a series of concerts that would become the turning point in their careers. For almost two months, they performed alongside the bigger tickets: Roque Narvaja and Pedro y Pablo with guest stars, Luis Alberto Spinetta, Héctor Starc and Emilio Del Guercio, among others. After having been turned down by various record labels, Sui Generis Manager Pierre Bayona contacted Microfon Producer, Jorge Álvarez, whom, after a test performance, signed the group on with his record label.

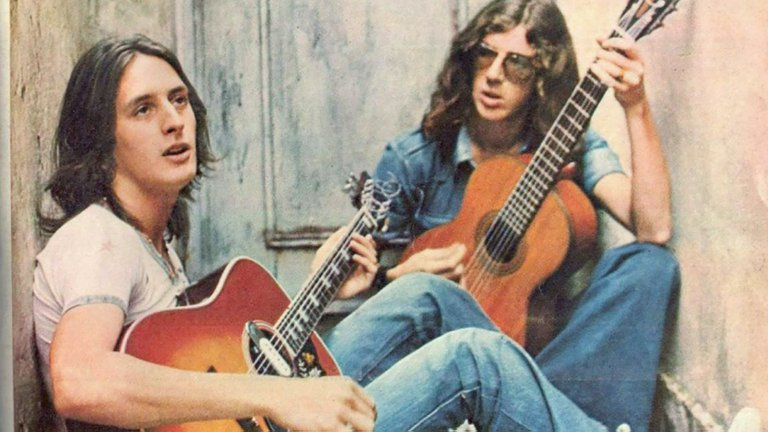
Mestre (left) and Charly García photographed in the beginning of their careers with Sui Generis

Their debut album was called "Vida" (Life) having among others, guest musicians like violinist Jorge Pinchevsky, bass guitar player Alejandro Medina and Claudio Gabis on the electric guitar. Recording was completed in October, 1972. The band then made two significant performances. One, again at the Olympia Theatre alongside Raul Porchetto, the other late that year at the third edition of the Buenos Aires Rock Festival (B.A.Rock). With the performance of Canción Para Mi Muerte, eventually one of their most popular songs, they appeared in the movie "Hasta que se Ponga el Sol" (Until the Sun Sets) directed by Aníbal Uset, the first Argentine film to address rock n' roll, shot during that festival.

As a preview to the album, the Record Company released a single with both Canción para mi Muerte and Amigo Vuelve a Casa Pronto. The official release of the album took place at the conspicuous Buenos Aires Opera Theatre in April 1973. The repercussion was enormous. In May, Francisco "Paco" Pratti (drums) and Alejandro Correa (bass) joined Nito and Charly in the band. One month later, they returned to the studio to record Aprendizaje (Learning) and Bienvenidos al Tren (Welcome to the Train), the first two songs in the second album, called "Confesiones de Invierno" (Winter Confessions) which was completed in August. It included recordings by David Lebón on guitar and Leon Gieco, and was released in October.

In the summer of 1974, they went on a very successful tour to Córdoba, Mar del Plata, Punta del Este and Santa Fe. On their return, Juan Rodríguez replaced Pratti on drums. He would later become a part of Nito's band Nito Mestre y Los Desconocidos de Siempre. After many months of rehearsing, they began the recording of their third album. It was titled "Pequeñas Anécdotas sobre las Instituciones" (Small Anecdotes about the Institutions). This album faced problems with censorship which in those days was obsessed with the political persecution of both young and old artists. As a result, some songs had to be replaced by others. Such was the case with Juan Represión (John Repression) which was replaced by Tango en Segunda and El Tuerto y Los Ciegos (The One-Eyed and the Blind) which replaced Botas Locas (Crazy Boots). On other songs, lyrics had to be rewritten: Instituciones (Institutions), Las Increíbles Aventuras del Sr. Tijeras (The Incredible Adventures of Mr. Scissors) and Para Quién Canto Yo Entonces (Whom Do I Sing For Then). On this occasion, David Lebón, Jorge Pinchevsky and León Gieco were all invited to take part in the recordings.

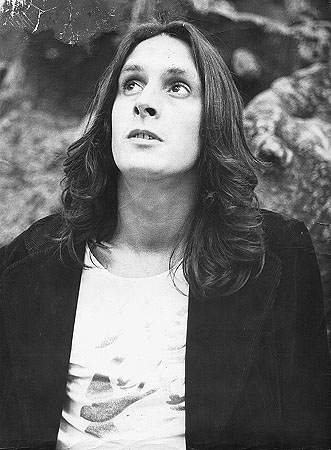
Mestre c. 1975

From this moment on, Charly Garcia begins to experiment with new instruments that had been brought from the United States: a moog, an ARP string synthesizer and a Fender Rhodes keyboard. In those days, it was an audacious move, and gave the album more of an electronic sound. While recordings were taking place, the band took part in the recording and staging of "La Biblia" (The Bible) by Vox Dei together with Billy Bond, David Lebón, Espíritu and Billy Bond y La Pesada del Rock and Roll. After this presentation, bass player Rinaldo Rafanelli replaced Alejandro Correa.

The new songs were first performed on December 13 at the Teatro Coliseo to an audience of 1800 spectators. The album was released three days later and had already sold over 30,000 copies before it hit the stores. During the winter of 1975, Charly and Nito went on the PorSuiGieco Tour with María Rosa Yorio, Raúl Porchetto and León Gieco. Meanwhile, Rafanelli and Correa joined Lebón in an experience that later became Polifemo. When touring was over, Charly, sick and tired of having to deal with censorship, proposed that the group be dissolved in order to keep it from wearing out. Together with Nito, they decided to try their luck abroad but two months down the road, Nito had to agree with Charly that the time had come for the duo to separate.

On the September 5th, 1975 at the Luna Park Stadium in two consecutive performances before a record audience of 30,000 people, Sui Generis bade farewell to its fans.

From the Concert, there was a movie made. It was called "Adiós, Sui Generis", directed by Bebe Kamin, under the supervision of the great Leopoldo Torre Nilsson. The film was released on September 2, 1976 at the Plaza Cinema and was rated by the authorities, still under the supervision of Miguel Paulino ("Tato"), the Mr. Scissors from the song, as an X rated movie. Finally, the band departed doing a small tour of the province of Buenos Aires and these were to become Sui Generis' last performances before their final separation.

In December 2000 Nito and Charly got back together again for a series of concerts to mark the 25th Anniversary of the band.

=== Solo career ===
"Nito Mestre and Los Desconocidos de Siempre" was formed in early 1976, after Sui Generis had finally separated. During its early stage, the band was formed by María Rosa Yorio, Alfredo Toth, Rodolfo Gorosito, Francisco Pratti, Osvaldo Calo and Mestre himself.

Their first album was recorded at ION Studios in Buenos Aires in 1976 and was released on September 6 in a show at the Estrellas Theatre with a series of performances that lasted for two months. The band was one of the few rock groups to play such a significant number of live gigs during those days. It was awarded the prize for the best folk group of the year and Nito won the Best Rock Singer title for his third consecutive year. The departure of Osvaldo Calo from the band – he was invited to play with Astor Piazzola in France - marked the arrival of a series of pianists like Alejandro Lerner, Eduardo Zvetelman and finally Ciro Fogliata, ex keyboard player for Los Gatos.

The band's second album was recorded between Argentina and Brazil in 1978 and was followed by a two-month tour of Brazil together with Leon Gieco and Crucis. On their return to Buenos Aires, the band performed at the Luna Park and in 1979, Nito Mestre and Los Desconocidos de Siempre recorded Saltaba sobre las nubes (Jumping Over the Clouds), an LP that made record sales that year. Ciro Fogliata later emigrated to Spain and was replaced by Mono Fontana who played first the drums and then piano, leaving the drum work to Claudio Martinez, former member of Espiritu. In 1980, after having made a great many live presentations both in Argentina and abroad, Los Desconocidos de Siempre dismembered in August.

Mestre embarked on a solo career that same year with the hit album 20/10. In 1981, Mestre reappeared on the music scene with both a new band and a new album: 20/10, another gold record that was first performed on stage at the Ferro Carril Oeste Stadium in a sold-out concert. The concert marked a turning point in his career and he embarked on a 52-show tour up and down the country (Argentina) as well as an important appearance in Montevideo, Uruguay alongside Seru Giran. In 1982 he recorded Nito Mestre en Vivo (Live), in Montevideo Uruguay, and received yet another gold record for the album. Between 1983 and 1985, he travelled outside his native Argentina to Peru and other neighbouring countries, playing as a solo artist for the first time.

After Mestre finished recording his third solo album, Escondo Mis Ojos Al Sol, (Hiding My Eyes from the Sun) and concluded a series of national and international tours, in 1984 he joined Juan Carlos Baglietto, Oveja Negra and Celeste Carballo on a tour designed to explain: "Por Qué Cantamos" (Why We Sing), inspired in the words of the Uruguayan Poet Mario Benedetti. This performance made a significant contribution to the meaning of Rock ‘n Roll in Argentina: "We sing in the name of love, freedom and life". The spirit behind the tour took them all around the country and abroad. In November of that same year, the tour was consolidated in a doble album of the same name, "Por Qué Cantamos" recorded live at Teatro Coliseo in Buenos Aires.

In October 1986, the fourth solo album, Nito, was released. This work reunited such artists as Folklore singer Mercedes Sosa, Charly García, Andrés Calamaro, Fito Páez and Celeste Carballo. Nito, the album, was also released In Mexico, Venezuela, Ecuador, Chile, Peru, Uruguay and Bolivia. It was until 1988, that Nito traveled all over the region presenting his work with enormous repercussion. In 1989, he set himself up in Chile to tour the country with important local artists such as Los Jaivas, Congreso and his friend Eduardo Gatti with whom he later recorded Entrada de Locos.

In 1990, he returned to Argentina where he began work on his album Tocando El Cielo (Reaching for the Sky), which he himself produced. During that time, Mestre experimented in the making of his own videos alongside the celebrated Alfredo Lois. In 1993, he recorded the techno and dance versions of Rasguña Las Piedras with David Lebon, something that to this days still surprises Nito’s listeners.

Later that year, he would start working on Nito Canta Sui in Miami and Los Angeles together with a cast of various musicians. These included Julian Navarro, also the producer, John Robinson (drums), Larry Coryel (guitar), Abraham Laboriel (base), Alex Acuna (percussion) Tom Scott (Saxophone), the Los Angeles String Ensemble amongst other virtuosos in the world of music. This album gave Mestre the opportunity to record the old Sui Generis classic songs to the sounds of the modern age. Nito has performed these songs to audiences all over Latin America, including the symphonic version of the songs with classical orchestras around Argentina.

In 1997, he played in a series of international festivals in Chile and Peru and in 1999, under his own record label Discos Tekla, he released Colores Puros (Pure Colors). The album contains songs written by Fito Paez, Miguel Zavaleta, Silvio Rodriguez and one in duo with his friend Leon Gieco.

In 2000, Mestre and Charly García reunited for a series of concerts, including a performance at the Boca Juniors stadium. This reunion resulted in the release of the album Sinfonías para Adolescentes (Symphonies for Teenagers), which was followed by the album Sí in 2001.

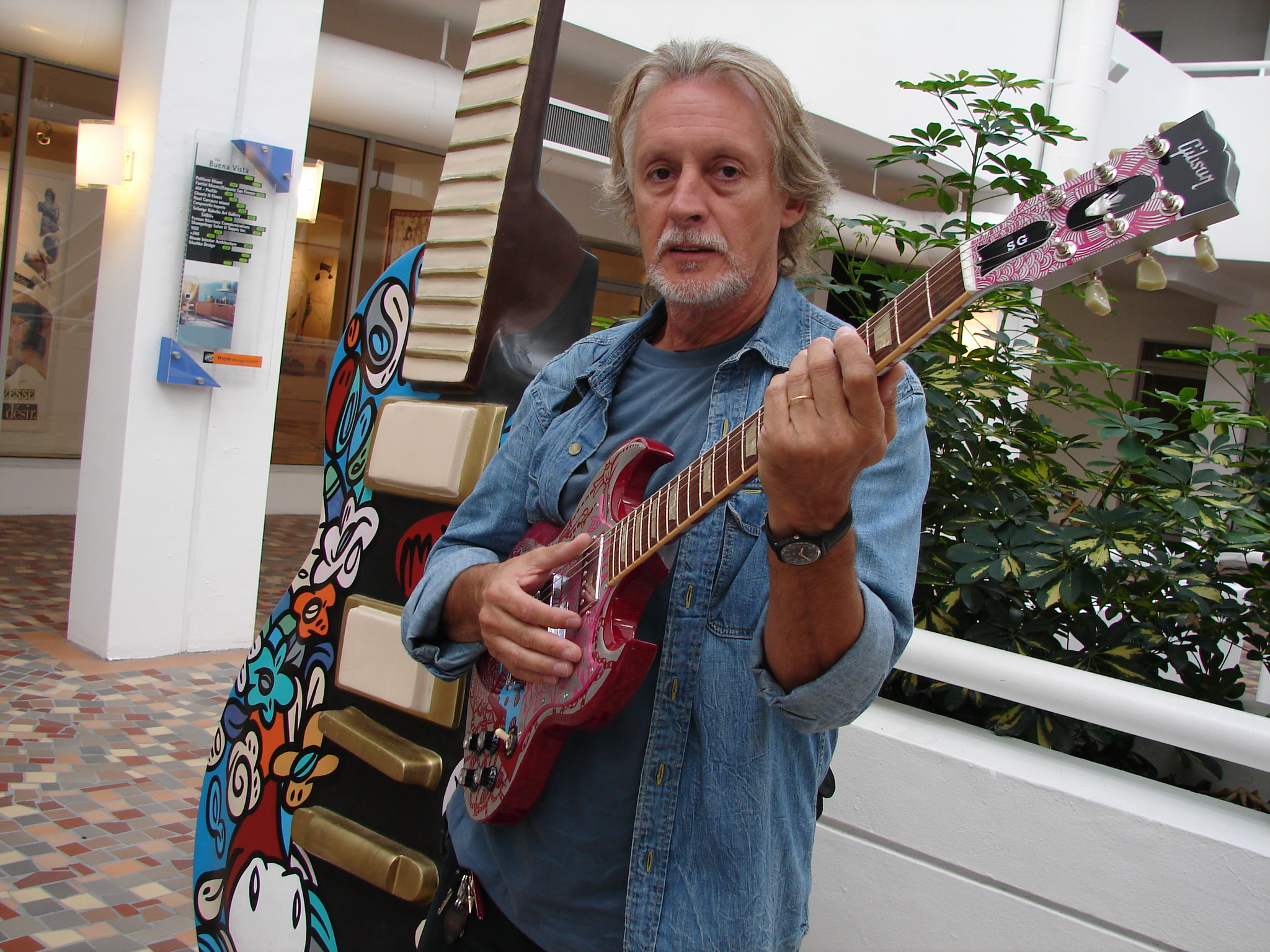
Mestre in 2007

Recently, Sony Argentina released a doble album commemorating Nito’s 30th Anniversary with music, a doble album called ‘Anos” (Years). The record was performed at the Billboard on Miami’s Ocean Drive in 2002. Nito Mestre has just concluded work on his album number 22, in Miami, USA. Only recently, Nito Mestre finished recording his most recent album which has still to be given a name. The songs were carefully chosen : Ven Al Jardin (Come to the Garden) was written and recorded with the lead singer of La Ley, Beto Cuevas; as in previous works, Leon Gieco is also present in the album in Veo Tus Ojos (I See Your Eyes) with his characteristic voice and the magical notes that spring from his harmonicas. Alejandro Lerner also did his part in the song "Me Dijeron" (They Told Me So) as did Eduardo Cautinio from Puerto Rico and Cris Zalles from Chile who wrote the music and lyrics of "Recordando lo que Tengo que Olvidar" (Remembering That Which I Have To Forget) song in which Ale Lerner also contributed with the piano and harmonies, and the lyrics of "Hay formas de llegar" and "El fin del mundo". Nito Mestre wrote the music of 5 songs in this album, and a couple of lyrics, too.

Ernesto Salgueiro was present throughout the recording sessions in Argentina on guitar, Andres Dulcet on base and Diego Ferrar played drums on two of the tracks. The album – produced by Pablo Manavello – was recorded in two separate phases: the first in the Miami Studios of Iker Gastaminza and the second at El Pie in Buenos Aires, Argentina.

A number of solo albums followed (as of January 2008, Mestre has released over 9 recordings under his own name), and continues to record and perform. Nito is currently touring South, Central and North America presenting his latest CD, DVD "Nito Mestre Completo: En Vivo", recorded live in Buenos Aires; at the Teatro Ateneo released in 2007. On 25 March 2009, Nito Mestre release his new DVD in USA by DELANUCARECORDS, and present an acoustic concert in Miami with friends.

Nito released an EP with four new songs that he recorded in Nashville in March 2009, and a DVD with a Simphonic Orchestra of San Juan, with more than 120 musicians on stage. In April 2017, he performed in New York City and Washington D.C. and continues touring in North and South America.

== Discography ==
=== Sui Generis ===
- 1972 - Vida ("Life")
- 1973 - Confesiones de Invierno ("Winter Confessions")
- 1974 - Pequeñas anécdotas sobre las instituciones ("Little Anecdotes about Institutions")
- 1975 - Adiós Sui Géneris, Parte I & Parte II ("Good Bye, Sui Géneris, Part I & Part II)
- 1992 - Antología de Sui Generis ("Sui Géneris Anthology")
- 1993 - Adiós Sui Generis III (live from 1975) ("Good Bye, Sui Generis, Volume 3")
- 2000 - Sinfonías para adolescentes ("Symphonies for Teenagers")
- 2001 - Si-Detrás de las Paredes ("Yes-Behind the Walls") (Live album)

=== Porsuigieco ===
- 1976 - Porsuigieco (Raúl Porchetto, Sui Generis, León Gieco)

=== Nito Mestre y Los Desconocidos de Siempre ===
- 1977 - Nito Mestre y Los Desconocidos de Siempre ("Nito Mestre and the Usual Strangers")
- 1978 - Nito Mestre y los Desconocidos de Siempre II ("Nito Mestre and the Usual Strangers II")
- 1979 - Saltaba sobre las nubes ("I Jumped Over the Clouds")

=== Solo career ===
- 1981 - 20/10
- 1982 - Nito Mestre En Vivo ("Nito Mestre Live") (Live album)
- 1983 - Escondo mis ojos al sol ("I Hide my Eyes from the Sun")
- 1986 - Nito
- 1991 - Tocando el cielo ("Touching the Sky")
- 1993 - Canta a Sui Generis ("Sings Sui Géneris")
- 1999 - Colores Puros ("Pure Colors")
- 2005 - Mestre.
- 2007 - Nito Mestre Completo: En Vivo ("The Complete Nito Mestre: Live") (DVD)
- 2010 - Flores en Nashville ("Flowers from Nashville") (CD and DVD with San Juan Symphony Orchestra) (2010)
- 2014 - Trip de agosto ("August Trip")

=== With other artists ===
- 1980 - Música del Alma ("Music from the Soul") (with Charly García, León Gieco, Raúl Porchetto & David Lebón)
- 1985 - Porque Cantamos ("Because We Sing") (with Juan Carlos Baglietto, Celeste Carballo and Oveja Negra)
- 1989 - Entrada de Locos ("Crazy Entrance") (with Eduardo Gatti)
