= Vida (Sui Generis album) =

Studio album by Sui Generis
- Released: November 1972
- Recorded: August – September 1972
- Studios: Estudios Phonalex, Buenos Aires
- Genres: Folk rock, progressive rock
- Length: 31:20
- Label: Microfón
- Producer: Jorge Álvarez

Sui Generis chronology
Vida (1972)	Confesiones de Invierno (1973)

Vida (Life) is the debut album by Argentine rock group Sui Generis, released in 1972 by Microfón.

In 2007, the Argentine edition of Rolling Stone ranked it 66th on its list of The 100 Greatest Albums of Argentine Rock. The album launched the wildly spread fame both of the duo and of Charly García, and is perceived as expressing the voice of a generation, with several of its songs entering the national cultural landscape being for example a staple of a campfire or sing-along repertoire until today.

== Background ==
Sui Generis was an electric band formed at the Instituto Social Militar Dr. Dámaso Centeno under the influence of the Swinging London and the regulars of La Cueva. The project soon became an acoustic duo. And, during a tour of Mar del Plata, they were signed by Jorge Álvarez for the Talent Microfón label. Very soon Álvarez (founder of Mandioca) managed to incorporate Sui Generis into the grid of the third "B.A. Rock" festival and secure their inclusion in the subsequent movie Hasta que se ponga el sol. In a period dominated by explosive bands like Color Humano or Pescado Rabioso, acoustic songs were a risky bet. The duo's first live performance was documented in the film.

Vida features a structure of progressive folk tunes, with a backing band of musicians from Manal and Billy Bond y La Pesada del Rock and Roll.

== Track listing ==
Side one

#	Title	Time
1.	"Canción para mi muerte" (Song for My Death) (Charly García)	3:37
2.	"Necesito" (I Need) (García)	2:16
3.	"Dime quién me lo robó" (Tell Me Who Stole It From Me) (García)	6:30
4.	"Estación" (Season) (García)	1:28
5.	"Toma dos blues" (Take Two Blues) (García)	3:33

Side two

#	Title	Time
6.	"Natalio Ruiz, el hombrecito del sombrero gris" (Natalio Ruiz, the little man of the gray hat) (Lyrics: Mario C. Piégari; Music: García)	3:50
7.	"Mariel y el Capitán" (Mariel and the Captain) (García)	2:45
8.	"Amigo, vuelve a casa pronto" (Friend, Come Back Home Soon) (García)	3:26
9.	"Quizás, porque" (Maybe, because) (García)	2:17
10.	"Cuando comenzamos a nacer" (When We Begin to Be Born) (García)	2:40
11.	"Posludio" (Poslude) (García)	0:50

== Personnel ==
Sui Generis:

- Charly García — piano, guitar, vocals
- Nito Mestre — guitar, flute, vocals

Additional Musicians:

- Jorge Pinchevsky — violin
- Claudio Gabis — guitar
- Alejandro Medina — bass
- Francisco Pratti — drums
