= Confesiones de Invierno =

Studio album by Sui Generis
- Released: August 1973
- Recorded: June–July 1973
- Venue: RCA Victor Studios, Phonalex Studios, Buenos Aires
- Genre: Folk rock; folk pop; symphonic rock
- Length: 36:20
- Label: Talent
- Producer: Charly García, Jorge Álvarez

Sui Generis chronology
Vida (1972)	Confesiones de Invierno (1973)	Pequeñas anécdotas sobre las instituciones (1974)

Confesiones de Invierno (Winter Confessions) is the second album by Argentine rock group Sui Generis, released in 1973 by the Talent label.

== Details ==
There are several versions of the origin of "Rasguña las Piedras", the most popular song on the album. One version says that Charly García had a girlfriend who was "dead" (catatonic) and buried. Some time later the body was exhumed and when they opened the coffin they found that the lid was scratched showing that she was buried alive. Another version says that this is about the military coup of 1976 in Argentina. The story of people dead, missing and detained in secret, where they were locked up in solitary confinement, with their hands tied and blindfolded, listening hour after hour as others were tortured. However, this song was written a few years before the coup. Another version is the love story between a boy and a girl, in which the girl was crushed by a wall, and the protagonist narrates what is happening and his inability to save her. She scratched the stones to leave, he listens and tries to do something, but cannot. The truth is that everything is clarified in an interview with Charly García by Felipe Bianchi in 2011: "For the last time. Is it true you wrote "Rasguña las Piedras" in honor of a girlfriend who had catalepsy?" "I have no idea who came up with that. Really. There are even more versions. They also say that my sister was dead. Nonsense! It's a myth. Neither catalepsy or anything. The song is pure poetic fantasy and it was done on a regular day. I was living with María Rosa Yorio in a cheap hotel and she went to buy potatoes or something. When she returned, the song was ready"

== Track listing ==
All songs written by Charly García.

Side one

1. "Cuando Ya Me Empiece a Quedar Solo" (When I Begin to Stay Alone) – 3:37
2. "Bienvenidos al Tren" (Welcome to the Train) – 3:14
3. "Un Hada, un Cisne" (A Fairy, A Swan) — 6:25
4. "Confesiones de Invierno" (Winter Confessions) – 4:05

Side two

5. "Rasguña las Piedras" (Scratch the Stones) – 3:11
6. "Lunes Otra Vez" (Monday Once Again) – 3:10
7. "Aprendizaje" (Learning) – 3:45
8. "Mr. Jones, o Pequeña Semblanza de una Familia Tipo Americana" (Mr. Jones, or Small Portrait of a Typical American Family) – 1:44
9. "Tribulaciones, Lamento y Ocaso de un Tonto Rey Imaginario, o No" (Tribulations, Moaning and Decline of a Foolish King, Imaginary or Not) – 5:56

== Personnel ==
Sui Generis:

- Charly García — vocals; piano (tracks 1–3, 5, 8, 9), acoustic guitar (tracks 2–7, 9), bass (tracks 1, 3, 9), organ (track 7)
- Nito Mestre — vocals (tracks 1–3, 5–9), flute (tracks 3, 7), acoustic guitar (tracks 6, 7)

Additional Musicians:

- León Gieco — harmonica (track 2)
- David Lebón — electric guitar (tracks 1, 3, 5, 7–9), slide guitar (track 2), bass (tracks 2, 8)
- Rodolfo Mederos — bandoneon (track 1)
- Alejandro Correa — bass (tracks 5, 6)
- Alejandro Medina — bass (track 7)
- Francisco Prati — drums (tracks 1, 2, 5–7, 9)
- Juan Rodríguez — drums (tracks 3, 8)
