= Piano bar (disambiguation) =

A piano bar is a venue where a pianist entertains.

Piano bar may also refer to:

- Piano Bar (Charly García album), 1984
  - "Piano bar", the album's title track
- Piano Bar (Patricia Kaas album), 2002
- "Piano bar", a song by Engenheiros do Hawaii
- "Piano bar", a song by Francesco de Gregori from Rimmel
- "Piano-bar", a song by Françoise Hardy from L'Amour fou
