= La Máquina de Hacer Pájaros =

Argentinian Band

La Máquina de Hacer Pájaros ("The bird-making machine") was a mid-1970s progressive and symphonic rock band from Argentina fronted by Charly García, with strong influences by Genesis, Premiata Forneria Marconi, Yes, and Steely Dan. In their brief two-year lifespan, they didn't have much public acceptance. It wasn't until several years later that they achieved a very high reputation nationally as well as internationally.

Their self-titled debut in 1976 was a blend of sixties rock, jazz rock, classic rock, and symphonic rock. Some of the songs that stand out are "Como mata el viento norte" and "Bubulina." Their second and final album, 1977's Películas, leaned more towards jazz and some experimentation, leading to a more crude progressive rock, which had more complex and elaborate songs. A good example of this are the songs "Hipercandombe" and "Qué se puede hacer salvo ver peliculas". The opening track, "Obertura 777," is one of the most internationally recognized Argentine instrumental rock songs.

== Members ==
- Charly García - lead vocals, keyboards, guitars
- Gustavo Bazterrica - guitars, backing vocals
- Carlos Cutaia - keyboards, backing vocals
- José Luis Fernández - bass, backing vocals, double bass, guitar
- Oscar Moro - drums, percussion

== Discography ==
- La máquina de hacer pájaros (1976)
- Películas (1977)
