= Billy Bond y La Pesada del Rock and Roll =

1970s Argentine rock supergroup

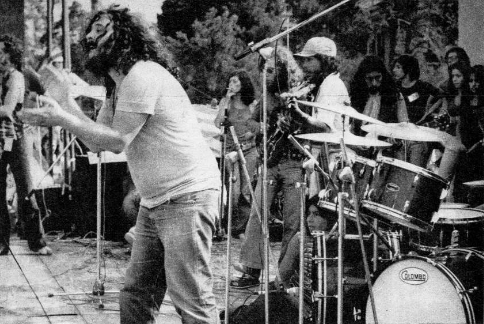
- Billy Bond y La Pesada del Rock and Roll playing live (1972)

Background information
- Also known as: La Pesada del Rock and Roll; La Pesada
- Origin: Buenos Aires, Argentina
- Genres: Hard rock; Blues; Rock and roll; Psychedelic rock; Proto-punk; Heavy metal
- Years active: 1970–1974
- Past members: 1. Billy Bond (vocals); 2. Pappo † (guitar); 3. Luis Alberto Spinetta † (bass and vocals); 4. Héctor Pomo Lorenzo (drums); 5. Vitico (bass); 6. David Lebón (bass); 7. Black Amaya (drums); 8. Javier Martínez (drums); 9. Pajarito Zaguri† (vocals); 10. Kubero Díaz (guitar); 11. Luis Gambolini (drums); 12. Nacho Smilari (guitar); 13. Cacho Lafalce (bass); 14. Alejandro Medina (bass); 15. Rinaldo Rafanelli † (bass); 16. Isa Portugheis (drums); 17. Claudio Gabis (guitar, harmonica, piano); 18. Jorge Pinchevsky† (violin); 19. Poli Martínez (guitar); 20. Charly García (keyboards and piano); 21. Jimmy Márquez (drums)

Billy Bond y La Pesada del Rock and Roll (also known as La Pesada del Rock and Roll or La Pesada) was an Argentine supergroup that pioneered hard rock and psychedelic rock in Latin America. It was formed in 1970 by producer Jorge Álvarez (co-founder of the Mandioca record label) and singer and producer Billy Bond, who would become the band's leader. Many renowned Argentine musicians such as Pappo, Luis Alberto Spinetta, Javier Martínez, Claudio Gabis, Alejandro Medina and David Lebón, among others, took their first steps in rock music in La Pesada. The band also collaborated in the recording of several albums by various artists, among them Vida, the first album by Sui Generis.

A concert of theirs at the Luna Park Stadium on 20 October 1972—the first rock concert in the history of the stadium— ended amidst fights, riot police, and Bond being arrested. This adversely affected the band's future opportunities. They continued releasing albums, both their own and those of other artists, and split up in 1974, with Billy Bond moving permanently to Brazil. However, the main legacy of the band, to have served as the launching pad for the careers of many musicians who would go on to become emblematic figures in the history of Argentine rock, had already been fulfilled.

== History ==
=== Origin of the band's name ===
According to Bond, the origin of the name La Pesada came from Álvarez and his friends, who had a habit of giving everyone female-gendered nicknames. Thus, La Pesada (Note: English: Lit. "The heavy (female) one") referred to Bond himself, who weighed 120 kilos y tenía la contextura de un luchador. (Note: English: 120 kg (around 265 lb) and was built like a wrestler)

=== First stage: open band ===
In La Pesada's beginnings, membership in the band was open. Both during performances and for recordings, the band featured outstanding musicians of the rock scene of the times, which made it a sort of national rock team.

The dissolution of Manal, Almendra, and Los Gatos, the founding groups of Argentine rock, created a vacuum. In spite of the growing popularity of bands like Vox Dei, this foreshadowed the potential extinction of this alternative movement as it had been known until then. The former members of the disbanded groups were facing the formation of new ones, but the presence of the rock genre on stages and in the media had diminished considerably. On the other hand, the independent label Mandioca had disappeared, and the major record companies were not managing their "progressive music" artists properly.

Many musicians who had belonged to pioneering bands (Pappo, Spinetta, Rodolfo García, Javier Martínez, Alejandro Medina, Ciro Fogliatta) frequented venues where they played informally, mingling with others who were beginning to stand out (David Lebón, Black Amaya, Poli Martinez, Luis Gambolini, Rinaldo Rafanelli). Initially, La Pesada fed from this talent, providing all of them with the opportunity to play and create within a context characterized by its spontaneity. The band's second album, known as La Oreja (alluding to the image on the cover), reflects the atmosphere of the zapadas (jam sessions) in which these musicians took part.

La Pesada fue un grupo maravilloso, toda la imagen de caos, de violencia y de tosquedad es falso, La Pesada era un grupo organizado, coherente, lleno de afecto, con una relación entre los músicos como nunca tuve en ningún grupo y con una eficacia comercial abrumadora. (Note: English: La Pesada was a wonderful group. That image of chaos, of violence and crudeness is false. La Pesada was an organized group, coherent, full of affection, with a relationship among the musicians as I never had in any group, and with an overwhelming commercial efficiency.)

— Claudio Gabis

=== Second stage: stable band ===
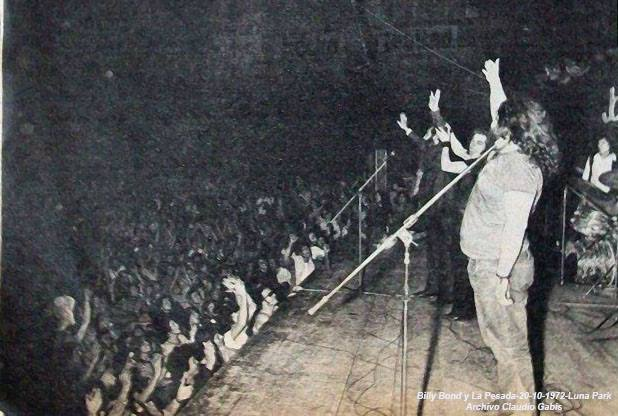
Billy Bond and the rest of the members of La Pesada, Claudio Gabis among them, trying to appease the audience. The catastrophe would take place just moments later, during which the stadium's seating area was almost completely destroyed.

In 1972, La Pesada's line-up stabilized, including Kubero Díaz and the newly recruited Claudio Gabis on guitar, Alejandro Medina on bass and vocals, Jorge Pinchevsky on violin, Isa Portugheis and Jimmy Márquez on drums, and Billy Bond on vocals and production. With this line-up, the band recorded solo albums by each member and several with artists who would later become famous, such as Sui Generis, David Lebón, and Raúl Porchetto. It performed in theaters and clubs in Buenos Aires and other cities in Argentina.

On 20 October 1972, La Pesada took part in the failed rock festival in which the Luna Park Stadium facilities were damaged due to clashes between the police and the concert-going public. The incidents had started before the concert but took a turn for the worse when La Pesada, the only band that agreed to go on stage under such circumstances, started to perform. Bond himself explained that when the concert started, there were about 4,000 to 5,000 people who had bought general admission tickets while the seats in the front were empty because los pibes del rock no tenían plata (Note: English: Rock fans didn't have any money). Thus, he encouraged them to get closer to the stage so they could see. This led some people to climb the fence, which in turn led to riot police immediately appearing con cascos, escudos y bastones. (Note: English: With helmets, shields, and truncheons)

Later, some media outlets attributed the chaos to Billy Bond's behavior on stage. According to him, the atmosphere that led to the incident was related to two events in Argentina's political history: first, in 1969, the first mass demonstration against the military dictatorship of General Juan Carlos Onganía, referred to as the Cordobazo; second, the Ezeiza massacre in 1973. And the chaos at the stadium—an incident that has been referred to as Rompan todo (Note: English: Break it all), after the cry uttered by Bond to the concertgoers—happened between those two dates.

Yo creo que lo que pasó aquella noche en el Luna Park fue la primera manifestación popular en contra del régimen y de la represión policial sin una organización detrás. Una gran válvula de escape protagonizada por chicos de clase media y clase trabajadora (...) (Note: English: I think that what happened that evening at the Luna Park was the first popular demonstration against the regime and police repression, without an organization behind it. A large escape valve featuring middle-class and working-class young people (...))

— Billy Bond

From then on, the band limited themselves to recording albums (their last, Volumen 4, among them) and giving very few public performances until 1974, when Claudio Gabis, Billy Bond, and Alejandro Medina decided to emigrate to Brazil, thus putting an end to the group's existence. In 2005, Bond had plans to reunite the band.

=== Their contribution to Argentine rock ===
Apart from the albums they recorded, La Pesada is recognized as the band that facilitated the transition and continuity between the first generation of Argentine rock artists and everything that came afterwards. Those who took part included former members of the founding groups and also new figures who would later play a leading role in the definitive establishment of this musical genre. That is, probably, the most noteworthy role played by La Pesada del Rock and Roll.

== Discography ==
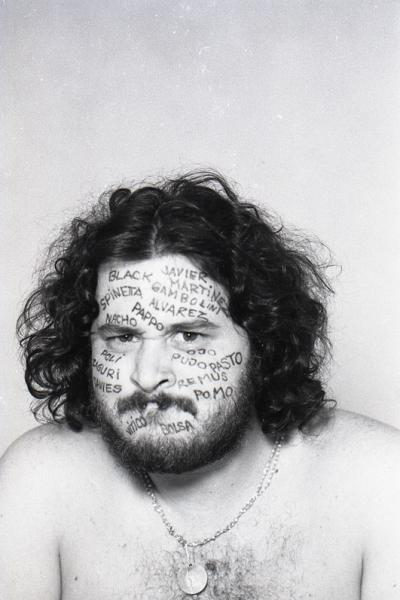
Billy Bond in 1971, posing for the cover art of the album Billy Bond y La Pesada del Rock and Roll. The image, by photographer José Luis Perotta, depicts Bond with the names of all musicians who participated in the album, written on his face.

=== As Billy Bond's backing band ===
- Volumen 1 (1971)
- Volumen 2 (1972)
- Tontos (Operita) (1972)
- Volumen 4 (1973)

=== Compilations ===
- Lo más pesado de La Pesada (1979, 1982, reissued on CD in 1994)

=== Other collaborations ===
- Raúl Porchetto: Cristo Rock (August 1972)
- Sui Generis: Vida (1972)
- Claudio Gabis: Claudio Gabis y La Pesada (1972)
- Jorge Pinchevsky: Jorge Pinchevsky, su violín mágico y La Pesada (1973)
- Kubero Díaz: Kubero Díaz y La Pesada (1973)
- Donna Caroll: Donna Caroll (1973)
- Jorgelina Aranda: Erótica (1973)
- David Lebón: David Lebón (1973)
- Alejandro Medina: Alejandro Medina y La Pesada (1974)
- Claudio Gabis: Claudio Gabis (1974)

=== Other projects ===
- La Pesada: Buenos Aires Blus (1972)
- La Pesada, el Ensamble Musical de Buenos Aires y otros: La Biblia (1974)

== See also ==
- Argentine rock
- Break It All: The History of Rock in Latin America

== Bibliography ==
- Ábalos, Ezequiel (1995). Historias del Rock de acá: primera generación: entrevistas (in Spanish). Buenos Aires, Argentina: Editora AC. ISBN 9789508770073.
- Bond, Billy (1 June 2023). Rompan todo. Memorias revueltas (in Spanish). Spain: Editorial Planeta. ISBN 978-950-49-8201-2.
