= Daniel Grinbank =

Argentine businessman and impresario (born 1954)

Daniel Grinbank (born May 12, 1954) is an Argentine businessman and impresario. His business creations include four radio stations, a record label and a production company. In 2002, he set up a mutual fund to aid Club Atlético Independiente, a football and sports club in Greater Buenos Aires.

Grinbank was behind The Rolling Stones' free concert in Rio de Janeiro (Brazil) on 18 February 2006, as well as performances in Argentina by AC/DC, Aerosmith, Arctic Monkeys, David Bowie, Eric Clapton, Coldplay, Bob Dylan, Franz Ferdinand, Guns N' Roses, INXS, Madonna, Paul McCartney, Metallica, Luis Miguel, Nirvana, Robert Plant, The Police, Prince, Tina Turner, U2, Red Hot Chili Peppers, Roger Waters, The Who and Yes. He also organised the Human Rights Now! tour closing concert in Argentina on 15 October 1988, in aid of Amnesty International, which featured Peter Gabriel, Bruce Springsteen and Sting.

He organises the Buenos Aires Jazz Festival (attracting the likes of Weather Report, John McLaughlin and Stanley Clarke) and has been responsible for bringing several musicals to Argentina, among them Beauty and the Beast, Chicago, Les Misérables and Sweet Charity. He represents a number of Argentinian acts, including Charly García, Mercedes Sosa and Los Fabulosos Cadillacs.

In 2003, he bought Club Deportivo Leganés, a second-division Spanish team. The team's line-up of high-level Argentine players left after half a season, however, and the club declined and has failed to recover, causing Grinbank economic losses.
