= Say No More (Charly Garcia album) =

1996 Charly Garcia album

Studio album by Charly García
- Released: November 28, 1996
- Studio: Say No More Studios
- Genre: Experimental Rock; Art Rock
- Length: 55:33
- Language: Spanish, English
- Label: Sony Music
- Producer: Charly García

Charly García chronology
| Hello! MTV Unplugged (1995) | Say No More (1996) | Alta fidelidad (with Mercedes Sosa) (1997) |

Singles from Say No More
- 1. "Alguien En El Mundo Piensa En Mí" Released: 1997

Say No More is the eighth solo studio album by Argentine musician Charly García. Released in 1996, it brings together songs made by the author with instrumental works that had been written for the film Geisha, but were not included in the soundtrack due to differences with the director. The album is considered Charly's darkest and most experimental, a concept album, in which decadence itself is the concept. "Alguien en el Mundo Piensa en Mi" was the only single, and "Cuchillos" became a classic soon after.

== Overview ==
The album is based on the Say No More concept: record an album directly, without a clear script or a specific list of songs. In this way, it was hoped to achieve a greater degree freshness to the current "formulaic" music. The chaos and dark psychedelia with hints of classical music and instrumental passages evolved from his previous album La Hija de la Lágrima (1994) gave a new sound. This album perfectly represents what the musician's life was at that time: complete chaos. It continues with the experimental sound of his previous studio album, but goes further: it is sadder, darker, deeper and more chaotic.

The song "Estaba En Llamas Cuando Me Acoste" ("I Was On Fire When I Lay Down") is a response to the tabloid press that covered the musician's latest scandals. In fact, this album highlights the constant presence of the artist's private life in his compositions. "Necesito Un Gol" ("I Need A Goal"), a collaboration with Andrés Calamaro, begins with some recordings of telephone communications from Buenos Aires to Madrid, where the album was recorded, in which "Migue" García, Charly's son, appears. The song "Cuchillos" was composed as a tribute to Mercedes Sosa, whom Charly had known since he was four years old because García's mother was a representative of folklore artists, Sosa being one of them. Over the years she forged a great friendship with Charly, appearing in the video for Cuchillos (the only one on the album) and even re-recording the song with Charly for the album of covers Alta fidelidad (1997). Say No More would dominate various aspects of Garcia's career even until 2010, with the Kill Gil album, through the symbol that was created for the dark and striking cover of the album, with the letters S, N and M superimposed on each other. This symbol would later appear on the covers of the albums El Aguante (1998), Rock and Roll YO (2003) and Kill Gil (2010).

== Reception ==
Say No More is perhaps García's most controversial work due to its dark and experimental sound, and at the time it was not well received (the newspaper La Nacion described it as "not easy to assimilate"). The change in sound, added to the increasingly frequent and notorious scandals at that time, ended up alienating a sector of Garcia's oldest public, while attracting a younger generation. Despite the poor reception it had at the time, over the years it was better valued, and today it is considered a cult album and a perfect portrait of the musician's personal moment. In an interview Garcia said that the phrase Say No More was taken from the film Help! starring The Beatles, and that even part of the film is played on the disc.

== Track listing ==
All tracks written and produced by Charly Garcia, except for the lyrics on "Necesito Un Gol" written by Garcia and Andres Calamaro

| No. | Title | Length |
|---|---|---|
| 1. | "Estaba En Llamas Cuando Me Acosté" (I Was On Fire When I Laid Down) | 7:03 |
| 2. | "Vemos..." (We See...) | 0:33 |
| 3. | "Canciones de Jirafas" (Giraffe Songs) | 2:48 |
| 4. | "Necesito Un Gol" (I Need A Goal) | 5:15 |
| 5. | "Alguien En El Mundo Piensa En Mí" (Someone in the World Thinks Of Me) | 4:27 |
| 6. | "Constant Concept" | 4:37 |
| 7. | "Say No More" | 4:36 |
| 8. | "Cuchillos" (Knives) | 4:29 |
| 9. | "A1" | 1:42 |
| 10. | "Plan 9" | 5:01 |
| 11. | "Casa Vacía" (Empty House) | 5:13 |
| 12. | "Podrías Entender" (You Could Understand) | 6:09 |
| 13. | "Intuición" (Intuition) | 1:40 |
| 14. | "La Vanguardia Es Así" (The Vanguard Is Like That) | 1:59 |
| Total length: | | 55:33 |
