= Rolling Stone Argentina's The 100 Greatest Albums of National Rock =

2007 list of albums

Magazine cover of the first edition of Rolling Stone Argentina's "The 100 Greatest Albums of National Rock"

The 100 Greatest Albums of National Rock (Spanish: Los 100 mejores discos del rock nacional) is a 2007 special issue of Rolling Stone Argentina, the local edition of the American magazine that is published monthly by S.A. La Nación. It was made available in newsstands on April 3. That month, Rolling Stone Argentina was issued as a special "double anniversary edition", with the list being released alongside the magazine's usual publication. The issue celebrated the forty years of Argentine rock and the nine years of Rolling Stone Argentina. In 2013, a revised "bookazine" edition of the list was released, incorporating more albums from the 2000s.

The list focuses on Argentine rock, which is locally known as rock nacional (Spanish for "national rock") and is considered a distinct style of rock music, born in the late 1960s in Buenos Aires at a time when the city was experiencing a cultural blossoming. Rock nacional has been defined as "fusion music of various rhythms, completely identifiable as belonging to the urban areas of the country. It is a synthesis of the original [rock] with other expressions that, in the opinion of the foreigners, sometimes sounds like tango or [folk music]." Although rock and roll already existed in Argentina, the countercultural, young bohemians of Buenos Aires were the first to create a local version of rock that spoke of their own concerns, with the particularity of featuring Spanish lyrics at a time when it was frowned upon. The release of Los Gatos' debut single, "La balsa" on July 3, 1967, is generally considered to be the origin of the movement, as it established its commercial viability and turned it into a widespread youth culture phenomenon. For this reason, The 100 Greatest Albums of National Rock only includes records released after "La balsa", and was issued in commemoration of the forty years of the single's release or, in other words, the fortieth anniversary of the genre.

The number one album was Artaud by Luis Alberto Spinetta (credited to Pescado Rabioso).

== Background ==
Made in a similar fashion to Rolling Stone's 500 Greatest Albums of All Time, the list was voted for by 180 people related to the genre, including musicians, journalists, photographers and members of the recording industry. Each album entry is accompanied by a journalist commentary, with the exception of Clics modernos, which Charly García wrote himself.

== List statistics ==
Among the first twenty albums selected, nine were recorded before 1983, the year Argentina's last military dictatorship ended.

=== Top 10 albums ===
2007 list
Number	Title	Year	Artists
1	Artaud	1973	Luis Alberto Spinetta (credited to Pescado Rabioso)
2	Clics modernos	1983	Charly García
3	Manal	1970	Manal
4	Oktubre	1986	Patricio Rey y sus Redonditos de Ricota
5	Divididos por la felicidad	1985	Sumo
6	Almendra	1969	Almendra
7	La era de la boludez	1993	Divididos
8	Treinta minutos de vida	1970	Moris
9	Canción animal	1990	Soda Stereo
10	Alta suciedad	1997	Andrés Calamaro

2013 list
Number	Title	Year	Artists
1	Artaud	1973	Luis Alberto Spinetta (credited to Pescado Rabioso)
2	Clics modernos	1983	Charly García
3	Manal	1970	Manal
4	Oktubre	1986	Patricio Rey y sus Redonditos de Ricota
5	Divididos por la felicidad	1985	Sumo
6	Almendra	1969	Almendra
7	La era de la boludez	1993	Divididos
8	Pappo's Blues Volumen 2	1972	Pappo's Blues
9	Canción animal	1990	Soda Stereo
10	Alta suciedad	1997	Andrés Calamaro

=== Number of albums from each decade ===
2007 list

- 1960s: 2
- 1970s: 30
- 1980s: 32
- 1990s: 29
- 2000s: 7

2013 list

- 1960s: 1
- 1970s: 27
- 1980s: 29
- 1990s: 27
- 2000s: 16

== See also ==
- Rock en español
- Rolling Stone's 500 Greatest Albums of All Time
- Rolling Stone Brasil's 100 Greatest Albums of Brazilian Music
