= Piano Bar (Charly García album) =

1984 studio album by Charly García

Studio album by Charly García
- Released: 1984
- Genre: New wave; pop rock; art rock
- Label: Universal Music Group

Charly García chronology
Terapia intensiva (1984)	Piano Bar (1984)	Parte de la religión (1986)

Piano Bar is the third studio album by Argentine musician Charly García. It was released in 1984 and recorded in Buenos Aires. Rolling Stone Argentina listed it as the 12th best Argentine rock album.

== Track listing ==
All songs written by Charly Garcia.

CD Track List
No.	Title	Length
1.	"Demoliendo Hoteles"	2:18
2.	"Promesas Sobre El Bidet"	2:47
3.	"Raros Peinados Nuevos"	3:37
4.	"Piano Bar"	4:58
5.	"No Te Animas a Despegar"	4:07
6.	"No Se Va a Llamar Mi Amor"	2:12
7.	"Tuve Tu Amor"	3:34
8.	"Rap Del Exilio"	2:09
9.	"Cerca De La Revolucion"	4:42
10.	"Total Interferencia"	5:01
