= María Rosa Yorio =

Argentine artist, musician (born 1954)

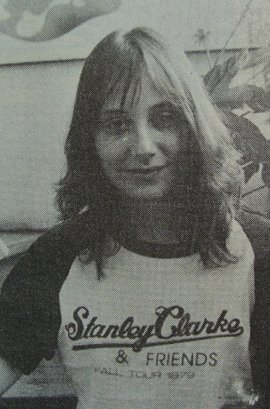
- María Rosa Yorio, 1979

Background information
- Born: 28 August 1954 (age 71); Buenos Aires, Argentina
- Genres: Argentine rock
- Years active: 1972–present
- Formerly of: Porsuigieco

María Rosa Yorio (born August 28, 1954 in Buenos Aires) is an Argentine painter, singer, songwriter, instructor and band leader.

== Early work ==
Born in Buenos Aires, Argentina; María Rosa started doing vocals with legendary band Sui Generis and gained recognition as a leading female singer of PorSuiGieco. She rose to fame with Los Desconocidos de Siempre along with band leader Nito Mestre. Later on Yorio started a solo career in the late 70's recording 5 albums on the 80's.

== 80’s and 90’s activity ==
On her debut album "Con los ojos cerrados" (1980), she was supported with recognized musicians such as Charly Garcia, Juan Carlos "Mono Fontana, Nito Mestre, David Lebón, Alejandro Lerner and María Gabriela Epumer among others. Yorio's second album was produced by Miguel Mateos and in 1983 she released a children's LP. She returned to classic folk with "Por la vida" (1984) turning to pop sound on "Puertos" (1986), adopting "Yorio" as her only stage name.

== Career ==
- 1972-1975: Sui Generis Vocals.
- 1974-1976: PorSuiGieco.
- 1977-1979: Los Desconocidos de Siempre.
- 1980 to present: Solo Career.

== Discography ==
=== With Porsuigieco ===
- Porsuigieco (1976)

=== With Nito Mestre y los Desconocidos de Siempre ===
- Nito Mestre y los Desconocidos de Siempre (1977)
- Los Desconocidos de Siempre II (1978)
- Saltaba sobre las Nubes (1979)

=== Solo albums ===
- Con los Ojos Cerrados (1980)
- Mandando todo a Singapur (1982)
- El disco de los chicos enamorados (1983)
- Por la vida (1984)
- Puertos (1986)
- Rodillas (1987)
- Asesina serial (2002)
