= Hasta que se ponga el sol =

1973 Argentine documentary film

- Theatrical release poster
- Directed by: Aníbal Uset
- Written by: Aníbal Uset; Jorge Álvarez
- Produced by: Fernando Ayala; Héctor Olivera
- Cinematography: Víctor Hugo Caula
- Edited by: Oscar Montauti
- Production company: Aries Cinematográfica Argentina
- Release date: February 8, 1973
- Running time: 80 minutes
- Country: Argentina
- Language: Spanish

Hasta que se ponga el sol (Spanish for "Until the sun sets") is 1973 Argentine documentary film of the foundational stage of the rock nacional (Spanish for "national rock") movement. It was filmed in the third edition of the historic B.A. Rock rock festival, which took place in 1972 at the Argentinos Juniors stadium. It was also completed with filming in Teatro Olimpia and the film studios of Argentina Sono Film and Phonalex. In addition to featuring live recordings of the main artists of Argentine rock of the time, it contains plot sequences interpreted by members of some of the groups that participated in the festival.

== Artists ==
- Arco Iris
- Billy Bond y La Pesada
- Color Humano
- Claudio Gabis
- Gabriela
- León Gieco
- Litto Nebbia
- Orion's Beethoven
- Pappo
- Pescado Rabioso
- Sui Generis
- Vox Dei

== See also ==
- List of historic rock festivals
- Piedra Roja
- Psychedelic rock in Latin America
