= Rinaldo Rafanelli =

Argentine singer (1949–2021)

- Born: July 4, 1949; Buenos Aires, Argentina
- Died: June 25, 2021 (aged 71) Villa Mercedes, San Luis, Argentina
- Occupations: Musician, singer, arranger, producer
- Instruments: Bass, vocals

Rinaldo Rafanelli (July 4, 1949 – June 25, 2021) was an Argentine musician, singer, arranger and producer.
