= David Lebón =

Argentine musician

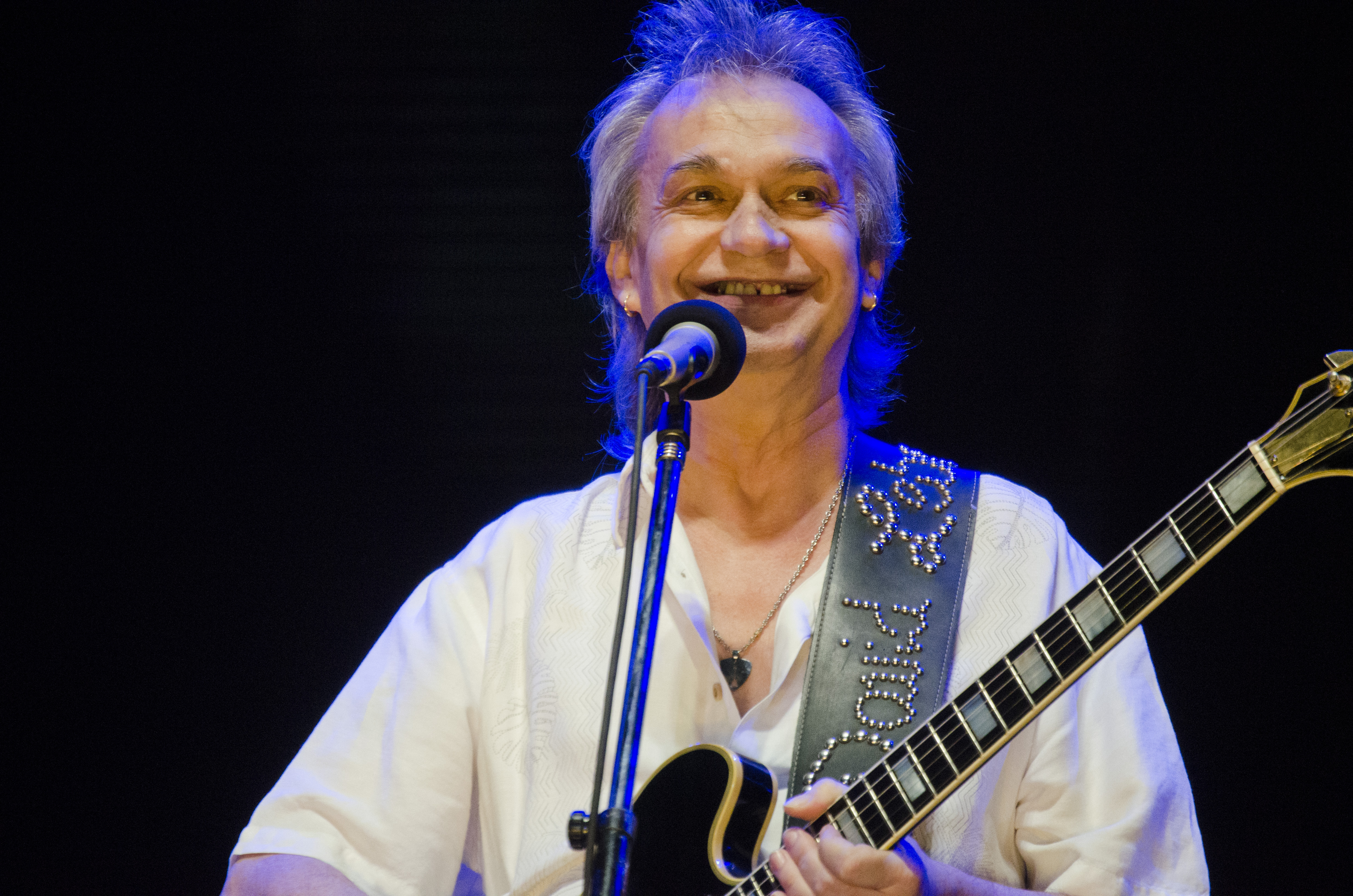
- Lebón in 2013

Background information
- Also known as: Ruso, Davies
- Born: October 5, 1952 (age 73); Buenos Aires, Argentina
- Genres: Blues rock, hard rock, Pop rock
- Instruments: Guitar, bass guitar, vocals, synthesizers, drums
- Years active: 1970 –

David Oscar Lebón (Buenos Aires, October 5, 1952) is an Argentine multi-instrumentalist, singer and songwriter of Argentine rock, long considered during the 70s and 80s the best guitar player in the country.

== Career ==
Born into a family of immigrants (his father was Basque-French and his mother a Russian), Lebón lived his childhood in Ituzaingó, Buenos Aires, with his father and three sisters. By age eight, he moved to the United States of America with his mother, their residence in the US coincided with the "Beatlemania", popular phenomenon which influenced on his future career as musician. He even got the chance to see them at the famous Shea Stadium Concert in 1965.

In the late '60s Lebón returned to Buenos Aires, where he was part of several rock bands throughout the '70s, playing different instruments, such as Pappo's Blues (bass and rhythm guitar), Billy Bond y La Pesada del Rock and Roll (guitar), Pescado Rabioso (vocals, bass and guitar), Color Humano (drums), Polifemo (vocals, guitar and bass), and Serú Girán (vocals and guitar), among others.

Since 1982, after his tenure in the aforementioned group Serú Girán, David Lebón has developed a stable solo career, gaining popularity as a solo artist, especially during the '80s, and also collaborating with musicians like Charly García, Luis Alberto Spinetta, Celeste Carballo or Pedro Aznar, to name just some. In 2012, the Argentine edition of Rolling Stone magazine placed him third on the list of the 100 best Argentine rock guitar players.

== Discography (solo) ==
- David Lebón (1973)
- Nayla (1980)
- El tiempo es veloz (1982)
- Siempre estaré (1983)
- Desnuque (1984)
- Si de algo sirve (1985)
- 7 × 7 (1986)
- Nunca te puedo alcanzar (1987)
- Contactos (1989)
- Nuevas mañanas (1991)
- En vivo, en el Teatro Coliseo (Live, 1999)
- Yo lo soñé (2002)
- Déjà vu (2009)
- Encuentro supremo (2016)
- Lebón & Co (2019)
- Lebón & Co Vol. 2 (2022)
- Herencia Lebón (2024)
