= La balsa =

Single by Los Gatos
- Language: Spanish
- B-side: "Ayer nomás"
- Released: July 3, 1967
- Recorded: June 19, 1967
- Studio: TNT Studios, Buenos Aires
- Genre: Beat; psychedelic rock
- Length: 2:56
- Label: Vik (RCA Victor)
- Songwriters: Litto Nebbia; Tanguito
- Producer: Tim Croatto

Los Gatos singles chronology
"La balsa" (1967)	"Ya no quiero soñar" (1967)

"La balsa" (pronounced [la ˈβalsa]; Spanish for "the raft") is the debut single by the Argentine band Los Gatos, released on July 3, 1967 on Vik, a subsidiary of RCA Victor. Formed in 1967 after the disbandment of Los Gatos Salvajes, Los Gatos were the house band of the bar La Cueva, which became a popular meeting place for rock enthusiasts and the birthplace of Argentine rock—known locally as rock nacional (Spanish for "national rock"). During the mid-to-late 1960s, Buenos Aires was experiencing a cultural blossoming characterized by innovations in modern art, literature and cinema, largely driven by a burgeoning youth subculture that adhered to the countercultural phenomenon of the decade. The underground had its center in La Cueva, Plaza Francia and the Torcuato di Tella Institute, and identified with British Invasion music. "La balsa" was written by Litto Nebbia—lead vocalist of the band—and Tanguito (credited as Ramsés) on May 2, 1967, in the men's toilet of La Perla de Once, another bar frequented by the group. At the time, Argentina was under a military dictatorship led by Juan Carlos Onganía, which regularly imprisoned and persecuted these young bohemians.

Released alongside the B-side "Ayer nomás"—written by Pipo Lernoud and Moris—"La balsa" became a major hit in Argentina and various Latin American countries, selling around 250,000 copies. It is a melodic, beat-influenced song, with prominent use of a Farfisa electronic organ and bossa nova elements attributed to Nebbia. Its sound—and commercial impact—reflected the loss of popularity of the nueva ola phenomenon and American rock 'n' roll, which began to be perceived as trivial. The success of "La balsa" was an unprecedented feat for Spanish-language rock (rock en español), as it established its commercial viability at a time when the use of Spanish lyrics was frowned upon. Its release is generally considered to be the origin of Argentine rock, paving the way for bands such as Almendra and Manal—along with Los Gatos, these bands are considered the founders of the style. The popularity of "La balsa" turned Argentine rock into a widespread youth culture phenomenon, and was followed by the appearance of the first magazines, independent record labels and music festivals of the movement. The song also became an anthem for the burgeoning Argentine hippie movement, which grew in size and influenced this first stage of rock nacional.

The song has also been the subject of controversy, which prompted Nebbia to not perform it live until 2001. The 1973 release of Tango, Tanguito's only studio album, established a myth which suggested that he was the most important author behind the song, and that Nebbia had taken advantage of his fragile state of mind. The polemic was revived with the 1993 film Tango Feroz, which made Tanguito an icon but was criticized for its historical inaccuracies. The success of the single and the stardom of Los Gatos was also followed by a complex debate on "commercial music" and the negative implications that the creation of a mass market could have on the authenticity of rock acts. "La balsa" continues to be acclaimed in retrospective, being considered one of the most important and influential releases of Spanish-language rock music. In 2002, it was listed as the greatest song in the history of Argentine rock by MTV and the Argentine edition of Rolling Stone. In commemoration of the 40th anniversary of the single's release in 2007, Los Gatos reunited and underwent a Latin American tour. It was also performed by Nebbia joined by several artists in 2010, as part of the Argentina Bicentennial celebrations.

== Background ==
=== Previous developments in Argentine rock ===
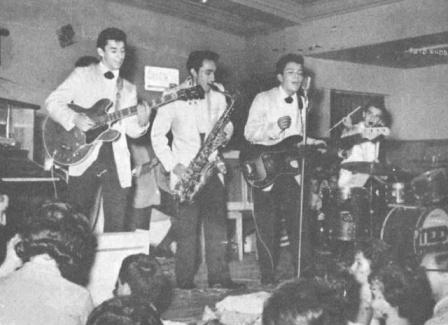
Mexican teen band Los Teen Tops performing in Buenos Aires in 1962. Through the innovation of making Spanish-language covers of American rock 'n' roll hits, the band was an important influence in the development of an Argentine scene.

Between 1955 and 1957, the porteño youth was introduced to rock 'n' roll music through films like Blackboard Jungle, Rock Around the Clock, Don't Knock the Rock and Rock, Rock Rock; becoming acquainted with American artists such as Bill Haley & His Comets, Little Richard, Jerry Lee Lewis and Elvis Presley. Mr. Roll y sus Rockers, a band led by Eddie Pequenino, recorded the first rock 'n' roll music of the country, covering various songs by Bill Haley and also writing original compositions in English. Like Billy Cafaro, another of the first Argentine rock 'n' roll musicians, Pequenino limited himself to imitating foreign artists. As it grew in popularity, rock 'n' roll music began to be embraced by young people, who began to veer away from tango, jazz, and the dance halls that until then they shared with their parents. According to Yanko González, "this initial rock represents, basically, a space of youthful fun that expresses itself through a dance with very provocative corporal movements for the time. There its transgression is established: in the audacity of its movements, in the expressive use of the body". In the early 1960s, Mexican band Los Teen Tops, originally led by singer Enrique Guzmán, gained popularity in Argentina and were influential in the development of an Argentine scene by introducing rock 'n' roll songs with Spanish lyrics. Other popular Mexican acts were Los Locos del Ritmo, Los Loud Jets, and the solo work of Enrique Guzmán. Until the release of "La balsa", singing rock music with Spanish lyrics was generally frowned upon, being considered "tacky" and "uncool", as the style was strongly associated with the English-speaking world.

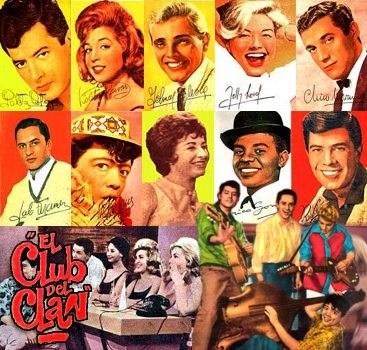
The young cast of TV show El club del clan, circa 1963

The early 1960s were also characterized by the emergence and success of the nueva ola, a phenomenon driven by the TV show, El club del clan that revolutionized the national youth music scene. Based on foreign music shows, each episode showed a group of friends that got together to perform various styles of music including rock 'n' roll (and the accompanying twist), bolero and cumbia. Highly popular, El club del clan turned its young cast—which included Palito Ortega, Billy Caffaro, Violeta Rivas, Lalo Fransen, Nicky Jones and Cachita Galán—into the first national teen idols. The show was cancelled in 1964, with the similar Sábados circulares being its successor. Over time, there was a repudiation of the nueva ola, as it began to be overshadowed by the popularity of British Invasion bands. A feeling nonconformity also grew among the youth, that saw nueva ola music as too carefree and lacking in ideology. More transgressive than the singers from El club del clan, Sandro rose to stardom with the debut of his band Los de Fuego in 1963, which covered foreign rock 'n' roll songs in Spanish. With obvious inspiration from Elvis Presley, his popular performances on television caused accusations of immorality. Sandro abandoned rock 'n' roll in 1967 and turned to romantic ballads, although he had already established himself as a pioneer of Argentine rock.

"Until the first half of the sixties we had rock, but not yet rock nacional. The adoption of Spanish as a local rock language would be the most outstanding aspect of the new stage, as well as a mark of identity."

— Yanko González, 2013.

By 1964, after The Beatles' performances in the United States, Beatlemania also reached Argentina, generating the appearance of several bands that imitated their sound and fashion. Local groups began to move away from the American and Mexican rock 'n' roll model in favour of a Beatlesque style and, gradually, Spanish-language songs. Billy Bond's band Los Guantes Negros, continuation of the Bobby Cats, is an example of this transition, featuring a new name and lyrics in Spanish and a sound inspired by the Beatles. However, the most successful band in using Beatles aesthetics were the Uruguayan Los Shakers, who were formed in 1963 and arrived to Buenos Aires two years later. Along with Los Mockers, they were part of the Uruguayan Invasion, a wave of bands from the neighboring country to find success in Argentina. They emerged as one of the first genuine rock products from the Río de la Plata, performing their own compositions. Although their decision to sing only in English prevented their popularity from extending beyond the decade, Los Shakers had a decisive influence so that rock music began to be produced in Argentina. Hugo Fattoruso of Los Shakers later stated: "It never occurred to us that we could make lyrics in Spanish. That was an Argentine invention." The TV show Escala musical "monopolized the whole beat music movement." It became the only program in the region to feature obscure local bands, and helped popularize the South American garage rock movement that had emerged in response to the Beatles, among them Los Gatos Salvajes, Los Larkins (predecessor of Almendra), and the Uruguayan Invasion bands. These groups could not find their place in El club del clan, which focused on a much more "sweetened and light" style than the new rock that emerged from London and the United States.

=== Counterculture, La Cueva and La Perla ===
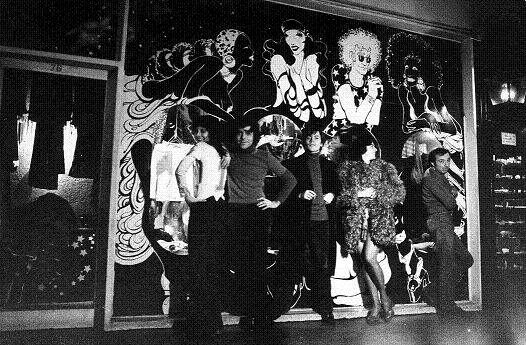
Young porteños at Galería del Este in Florida Street, a popular place for countercultural teens to meet and buy Swinging London and hippie-inspired clothes and wearable art.

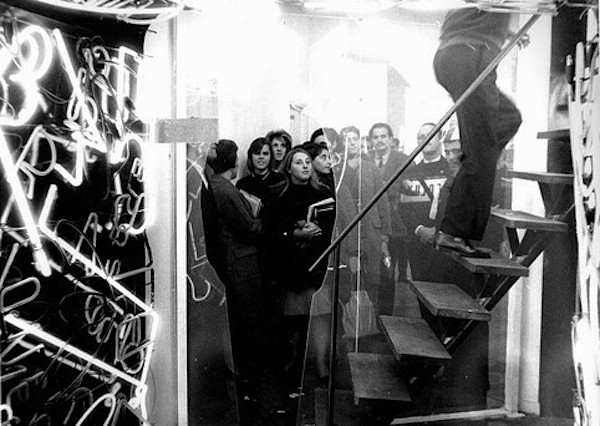
View of La Menesunda, a 1965 interactive installation by Marta Minujín. Displayed at the Torcuato di Tella Institute—an important center of youth-led artistic experimentation—the work revolutionized the artistic environment of Buenos Aires.

In June 1966, the self-proclaimed Argentine Revolution overthrew Arturo Umberto Illia and established Juan Carlos Onganía as the de facto president. The military dictatorship aligned with the United States' National Security Doctrine, and began to control universities, trade unions and cultural events. In this context, the Argentine middle class youth was deeply impacted by Beatlemania, the international non-violence and anti-authoritarian movements, and the sexual revolution; symbolizing their identity with rock music and a unisex point of view, with long hair on men as one of its most prominent exteriorizations. The years leading to the 1960s had been characterized by an increase in the cultural activity of the city. For instance, the Buenos Aires Museum of Modern Art was founded in 1956; while 1958 saw the creation of the National Institute of Cinematography, the Fondo Nacional de las Artes and the Torcuato di Tella Institute, while the construction of the Teatro General San Martín advanced, which would be inaugurated in 1960. This, coupled with the high quality of university education at that time, left an enduring imprint on the artistic and intellectual development of the country during the following years. A generation gap begun to be evident, characterized by young people's rejection of tango and the double standards of their parents' traditional sexual morality. An underground youth subculture began to appear in Buenos Aires, with its epicenter in the triangle formed by a precarious musical bar called La Cueva in Avenida Pueyrredón, the Torcuato di Tella Institute in Florida Street, and Plaza Francia. Today considered the first hippies of the country (although they did not use that name themselves), they adhered to the youth-led counterculture of the decade, which was spreading throughout much of the Western world. Deemed immoral and suspicious, these people — especially long-haired young men — suffered frequent police detention, media criticism, and the rejection of the intelligentsia and the mostly conservative population. Pipo Lernoud stated in 1996: "That is the particular thing that Argentine rock has. Not only was it a musical style but it was a culture that always faced repression by the system."

Under the direction of art critic Jorge Romero Brest, during the decade the Torcuato di Tella Institute became a leading center of avant-garde art production, with young artists venturing into pop art, happenings, installation art, and psychedelic art, as well as featuring folk and beat musical performances. It was a central part of the "manzana loca" (English: "crazy block"), which "[encompassed] nearby art galleries, book shops, and university buildings". The area also "served as a human showcase of the latest fashions and styles". On the other hand, the rock music scene mostly met in La Cueva or gathered in parks such as Plaza Francia to play their guitars, something musician Miguel Cantilo described as, "an act of affirmation and identification," because until then, traditional guitar-playing gatherings were reserved to folk music. In Víctor Pintos' biography of Tanguito, Rocky Rodriguez recalled: "La Cueva was totally like a Babel, it was like those biblical stories of the desert, where caravans come from various sides, and they all land in the same place." Among the group were musicians such as Los Gatos (led by Litto Nebbia), Moris (leader of Los Beatniks), Javier Martínez, Billy Bond (leader of Los Guantes Negros), Los Búhos, Las Sombras (which covered the instrumental rock of the Shadows), Tanguito, Miguel Abuelo, Pajarito Zaguri; writers like Miguel Grinberg, Juan Carlos Kreimer and Pipo Lernoud, and other bohemian artists and poets. In 1966, this generation created a new style of urban youth music, which tried to reflect an everyday reality absent from popular music since the tango era. It was initially known as "beat music" and later "progressive music", and is now considered the origin of rock nacional (Spanish for "national rock"). They mostly emulated the Beatles and the Rolling Stones, although there were also influences from Los Teen Tops, Bob Dylan, Joan Baez, Jimi Hendrix, Crosby, Stills, Nash & Young, and Frank Zappa. They were also influenced by the Beat Generation writers. La Cueva was very popular among porteño bohemians, and its existence even came to be known in Paris, prompting Juliette Gréco to visit the bar while in Buenos Aires. It has been compared to The Cavern Club of Liverpool, England. In 2005, Lernoud reflected:

It was in La Cueva where rock nacional really started. Without La Cueva's ferment, that mixture of musical, literary and ideological influences, [Argentine] rock would have been one more on the continent, another pale reflection of English ideas. [...] There is no history of rock, poetry, and struggle in the continent, with the exception of Brazil, as in Argentina, nor in Europe outside England. Because the cultural isolation imposed by the successive dictatorships and the multiplicity of rock influences, produced an original hybrid that was born there, in the late 1965 and early 1966...

"But the heart, the spirit of the movement was not intellectual, it was musical, rambling... The creative shipwreck... What happened is that there was a difference between us and the previous generations. Argentine intellectuals, plastic artists, poets and beatnik journalists, we did not want to get together for a couple of hours to talk in a cafe, we wanted to live twenty-four hours. Free life was the work of art. To live life without ties and discovering the beauty of the world, look what a proposal!"

— Pedro Pujó, founder of Mandioca Records, July 1993

As a quieter alternative to La Cueva, its musicians also began to go to La Perla de Once, a bar facing Plaza Miserere that remained open throughout the night. It was frequented by students and several members of the rock underground, and was a site of ideological and artistic discussion. Lernoud recalled in 2017: "We had no choice but to get together [in La Perla] because we were arrested in the street, for our long hair, for our clothes... And our parents did not want to know anything about those friends. Only in La Perla we could be calm, between equals." In addition to "La balsa", well known songs such as Manal's "Jugo de tomate" and Tanguito's "El hombre restante" were written in La Perla. Unlike what happened in North America or the United Kingdom, illegal drugs had a marginal place within the Argentine youth movement, which was more oriented towards the sexual revolution and the guidelines on personal presentation. Nevertheless, various rock musicians began to experiment with amphetamines, a drug that was frequently used by the students in La Perla. Tanguito was one of the first of the group to take drugs, and developed a serious drug dependence that would affect the rest of his life.

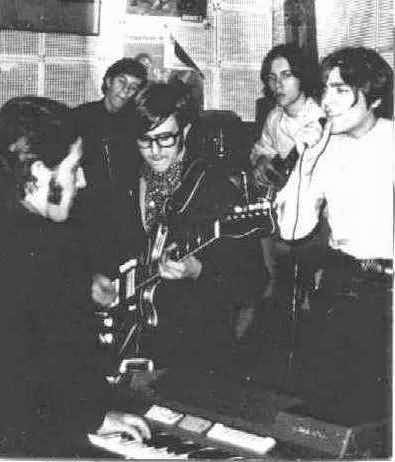
Los Gatos performing in La Cueva in 1967, a Recoleta bar frequented by the first Argentine rock musicians.

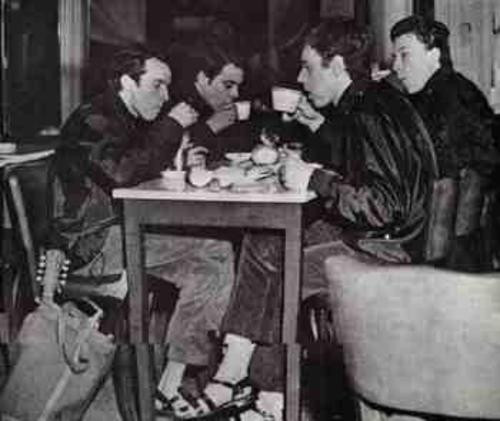
Los Beatniks in La Perla de Once in 1967, another meeting point for the rock underground, where "La balsa" was composed.

Los Gatos were formed in Buenos Aires in 1967, deriving from the band Los Gatos Salvajes. Originally called The Wild Cats, they were formed in 1964 and eventually translated their name into Spanish and "began performing songs in their native tongue". Basilio "Turco" Adjaydie, Guillermo Romero and Juan Carlos "Chango" Pueblas had decided to leave the band and return to hometown Rosario, following the cancellation of TV show Escala musical in 1966, where the band performed, as well as the commercial failure of their 1965 debut album, which led to the record company going broke. In Rosario, Nebbia had become acquainted with foreign rock and pop through his admiration of the Beatles and Neil Sedaka. With Rosario being a port city, the group also had access to recordings by English bands such as the Kinks, the Zombies and the Hollies, as well as the magazine Melody Maker. Through his musician parents, Nebbia was also knowledgeable of jazz artists such as Chico Hamilton, Gerry Mulligan, Dave Brubeck and Eric Dolphy, and was aware of Brazilian bossa nova since its emergence. Mark Deming of AllMusic wrote that "[Los Gatos Salvajes'] music reflected their enthusiasm for the Beatles, the Rolling Stones, and the Yardbirds; the major British groups had a following in South America, but the few Argentine rock acts were older and had yet to embrace the new sounds in music, putting the young band ahead of the trends." Regarding the music of Los Gatos Salvajes, Nebbia recalled in 2006:

In that time of adolescence, the music that got played in the radio was very commercial, a music that was not representative of what one wanted sound-wise. Neither the lyrics, they were European or American songs with a Spanish version that did not sound the way we spoke, plus they did not talk about the things we needed, that happened to us as teenagers. So when we started playing with Los Gatos Salvajes and I took my first compositions, those songs were very puerile because of the age that I had, but they did have a sound, a rhythm and a way to engage the lyrics that was totally different for the time. The point was the merseybeat, the beat we gave to the guitars.

Only lead singer Litto Nebbia and organ player Ciro Fogliatta stayed in Buenos Aires, and slept for months in public squares while trying to put together a new group. Eventually, they were joined by guitar player Kay Galiffi and drummer Oscar Moro, who were also from Rosario. Alfredo Toth, from Avellaneda, became the final addition to the group after Nebbia taught him how to play the bass. Los Gatos became the house band of La Cueva, performing every night from ten in the evening until four in the morning, and receiving a small salary with which they could pay a crowded pension in Once and barely eat. "La balsa" co-writer Tanguito, born José Alberto Iglesias de Caseros, was one of the most influential figures within the La Cueva underground. He made his musical debut in the spring of 1963 as the fronmant of Los Dukes. After leaving the band and aborting a solo project under the stage name Ramsés VII, Tanguito came to know La Cueva through friend Horacio Martínez, and throughout the following years became a fixture of Buenos Aires' rock scene. Tanguito was an admirer of Donovan and Bob Dylan, and his musical style was rooted in Mexican artists like the Teen Tops and Enrique Guzmán. There was a strong mutual influence between Nebbia, Moris and Tanguito; the latter making an impact in the scene for his emotion-driven, less intellectual approach to music, as well as his uncompromising ideas and personal style.

Besides rock music, the new generation "was [also] nurtured by and participated in" renovative musical movements such as tango nuevo and nueva canción. The city's cultural blossoming of the mid-1960s also extended to literature, as part of the Latin American Boom. It consisted of a blossoming of book publications, readership and literary criticism. The city also became a "cinephile capital". In particular, the Lorraine cinema became popular among college students for its art film cycles, which included French New Wave and Ingmar Bergman movies. Another place of interest for film culture was Núcleo film society, created in 1954 and led by Salvador Samaritano and Héctor Vena; they also published the film magazine Tiempo de cine since 1960. This diffusion of foreign cinema's new trends led to the emergence of the Generation of the 60s (Spanish: Generación del 60), a new wave of young directors who created Modernist films. The movement included Manuel Antín, Fernando Birri, Leopoldo Torre Nilsson and Rodolfo Kuhn. The latter's 1963 film Los inconstantes was filmed in Villa Gesell, and its depiction of young, modern people with a free lifestyle prompted many teenagers to go the coastal city. Several members of La Cueva headed to Villa Gesell, where Los Beatniks were formed and recorded their 1966 debut single, "Rebelde". The rebellious, antimilitarist song failed to make an impact, but became the first Argentine rock release.

== Writing and recording ==
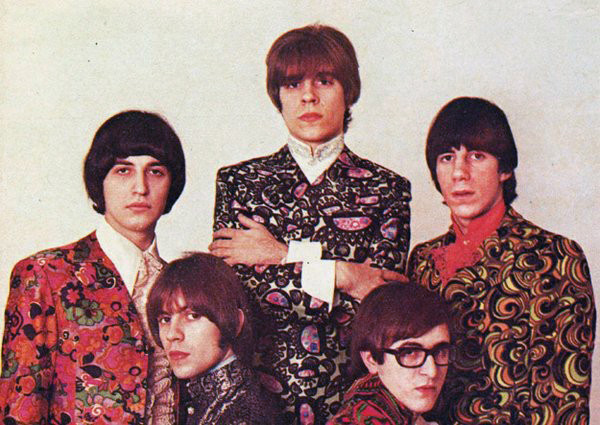
Los Gatos, circa 1968. Clockwise from top left: Ciro Fogliatta, Litto Nebbia, Oscar Moro, Kay Galifi and Alfredo Toth.

"La balsa" was composed in the early hours of May 2, 1967, in a corridor leading to the men's toilet at La Perla de Once. It was common for the musicians that frequented La Perla de Once to play their compositions for each other at the toilet, as it had better acoustics and the student environment of the bar did not allow them to make too much noise. The song was a joint effort between Litto Nebbia and Tanguito, the latter who came up with first verses and initial chords of the song, albeit with slightly different lyrics: "I'm very lonely and sad in this world of shit". Nebbia stated in 2005: "I got that out because I did not like it. Why, if we already know it's a world of shit, right? I do not like to say 'hijo de puta' (Note: Literally "son of a whore", one of the most used insults in the Spanish language. According to the Real Academia Española, it is a vulgar way of calling someone a "bad person.") just because." Javier Martínez claims to have witnessed the writing of the song, stating that "[Tanguito] showed the first part to Litto, and the next day he brought the rest." In 2012, musician Juan "Gamba" Gentilini—traveling companion of Tanguito—claimed that the singer began to write the song while taking the Old Patagonian Express and finished it in Esquel, Chubut Province. The B-side "Ayer nomás" (Spanish for "Just yesterday") was written by Pipo Lernoud and Moris. Lernoud was an aspiring poet that became a regular at La Cueva, and gave Moris one of his poems for him to musicalize. Lernoud recalled in 2017: "When he picked it up, he changed the accents, put chords in and suddenly, in front of my eyes, that little lyric I had taken to him became a round song. I loved it. I did not know it was going to become a hit."

Horacio Martínez, the band's manager and, according to Ciro Fogliatta, "practically one of [Los Gatos]", had connections with RCA Victor and linked the band to Mario Osmar Pizzurno, the label's artistic director. Los Gatos were given the opportunity to make a test for the record label, which consisted of the recording of a five-song demo. RCA Victor was displeased with the lyrics for "Ayer nomás", and suggested to Nebbia to change them. He approached Moris and Lernoud in La Cueva, and they gave him permission to modify them. As a result, what originally was a protest song—with lyrics such as "Just yesterday/At school I was taught/That this country/Is big and has freedom./Today I woke up/And I saw my bed and I saw my room/In this month I did not have much to eat"—became a romantic one. Lernoud said: "I told [Nebbia] to put the lyrics he wanted, to write them himself. The important thing was for [Los Gatos] to record. Because we had clear from the beginning that when the band recorded, with the quality of sound and professional level they had, they were going to cross the wall and make known what we proposed to the rest of society. And indeed it was." It is generally agreed that the test recording session took place on June 19, 1967, although Nebbia has conversely stated that it happened in late 1966, and "four or five months" before the release of the single. According to Todo Noticias, Tim Croatto was the producer of this session, while Salvador Barresi worked as the engineer. Los Gatos recorded the songs in two channels—one for the band and another one for the vocals and solos—for an hour at TNT Studios. RCA Victor agreed to sign the band and release "La balsa"/"Ayer nomás" the following month as a single, using the demo recordings.

== Music and lyrics ==
"La balsa"
"First a suggestive guitar. And then the bass-drums base in the typical merseybeat cadence. The keyboards, bossa nova chords, conquer from the beginning. However, the feat, the different thing, does not appear until the phrasing, that voice in Spanish that calls for "getting a lot of wood' and going 'to shipwreck'."
–Juan Manuel Strassburger, El Cronista, 2007

"La balsa" is a beat-inspired song that, through Nebbia's characteristic melodies and harmonies, combines influences of bossa nova, tango and jazz. Described as a "mergence of simple melodies", the track also incorporates Tanguito's more straightforward and blues-inspired style, specifically at the beginning of the song. It is one of the first compositions of rock nacional, a style that has been described as "fusion music of various rhythms, completely identifiable as belonging to the urban areas of the country. It is a synthesis of the original [rock] with other expressions that, in the opinion of the foreigners, sometimes sounds like tango or [folk music]." "La balsa" was recorded in an echo chamber, without backing vocals and a few electric guitar phrases in counterpoint with the singing. The song's famous introduction features the chords of E major and F♯ minor played on a guitar, followed by a Farfisa riff which marks a crescendo of three notes, in counterpoint with the electric guitar. Los Andes wrote: "[At the song's half,] Fogliatta performs an organ solo that takes the place that in the formal rock culture of that time used to assume the electric guitar". The bossa nova influence is mostly evident towards the end of the track, in a G♯ minor and F♯ minor combination that, according to Los Andes, "pre-dates part of the sound universe that Nebbia would cultivate with the years." An avid listener of this Brazilian genre, Nebbia incorporated a harmonic sequence from Antônio Carlos Jobim "The Girl from Ipanema" as the song's passing chords. Víctor Pintos wrote that "in 'La balsa', ideas and elements that would mark the DNA of Argentine rock come together: the bossa nova of Tom Jobin, the fusion of Piazzolla, the arid folk of Dylan and the merseybeat of the Beatles."

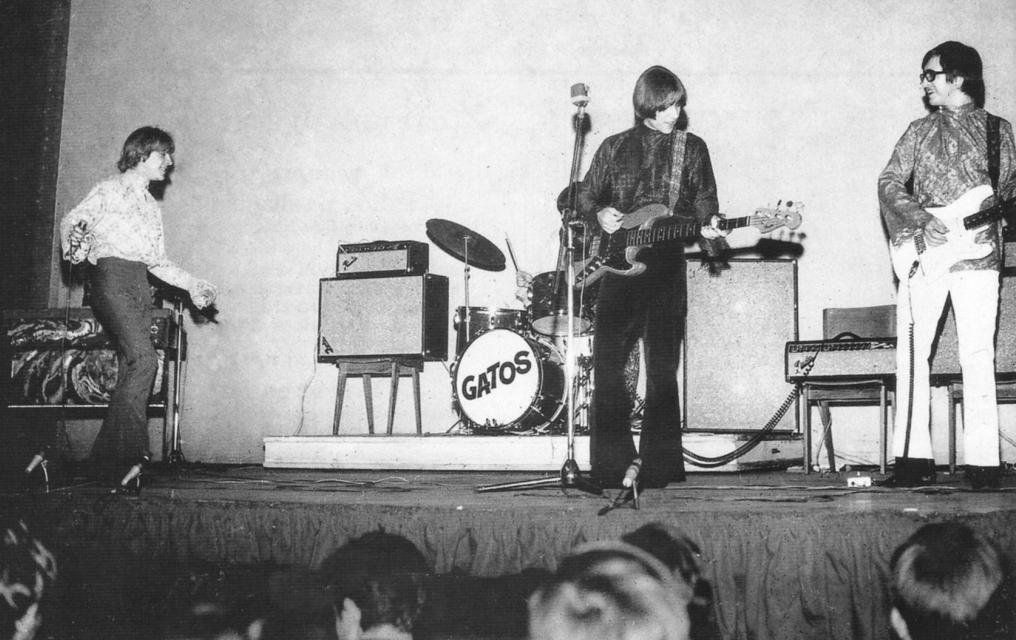
Los Gatos performing live, circa 1968

Much of the impact of "La balsa" has been attributed to its lyrics, which differed from the cheerful and shallow efforts of the nueva ola phenomenon. The youth of the time identified with the song's themes of nonconformity and yearning for freedom. Juan Carlos Kreimer, author of Agarrate! (1970), the first book dedicated to rock nacional, felt that: "the poetic strength of 'La balsa' did not come from the words that rhymed but from the pain and desolation that many of us felt then." It has often been suggested that the lyrics refer to recreational drug use, specially the lines "I have to get a lot of wood,/I have to get it from where I can". However, in his 2004 book Una mirada, Nebbia wrote: "I want to clarify that the lyrics for this track speak, with the humble metaphors of my adolescence, exclusively about freedom." Nebbia opens the song with the verse: "I'm very lonely and sad here in this abandoned world/I have an idea, it is to go to the place that I most want/I need something to go, because I cannot walk/I will build a raft and go to shipwreck". Pablo Schanton of Clarín felt that "naufragar" (English: "shipwreck" or "to castaway") was the keyword of the track, and that it "sums up a generational program." The word was part of the "neo-lunfardo" that Buenos Aires' first rock scene spoke, and was a reference to their characteristic wandering through bars and plazas throughout the night. To "castaway" has been described as "one of the basic modalities of rock sociability in Buenos Aires during the late 1960s." Miguel Grinberg has said that naufragar was a way to "not be sucked into the trap of the struggle for prestige, the struggle for power, the struggle for money." According to Pipo Lernoud, the song's "idea of floating and drifting" resounds with The Beatles' "Tomorrow Never Knows", with its lyrics "Turn off your mind, relax and float downstream". Pajarito Zaguri, another regular performer from La Cueva, has said Tanguito was greatly influenced by José Feliciano's bolero, "La barca", both in its title and several parts of the lyrics. Feliciano's song contains the similar lyrics: "... Your boat has to go/To other seas of madness/Take care that it does not wreck your living". Researcher and writer Mario Antonelli reflected:

As for the lyrics, Tanguito poses his current problem and Nebbia solves it, starting from "I am very alone here, and I want to go to that place of illusion, hope... To shipwreck, to be outside of all that is happening." Nebbia at that moment does not have a fixed place to sleep, he is in the streets of Buenos Aires. Then an idea of putting together a raft, of going out to another place, is generated. For this you have to work, you have to gather the wood, you have to do certain things, if not it is impossible to get to where you want to be.

== Release and reception ==
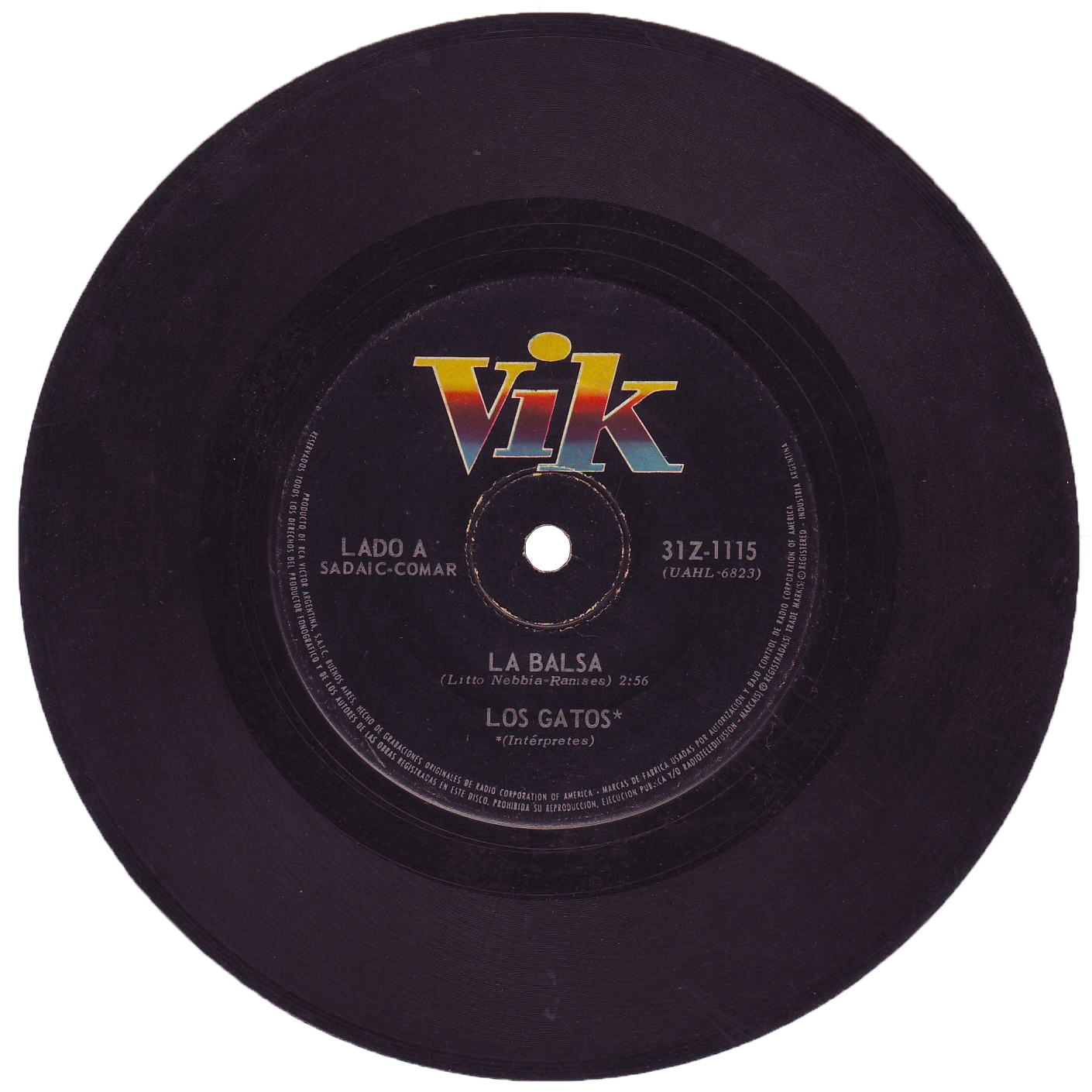
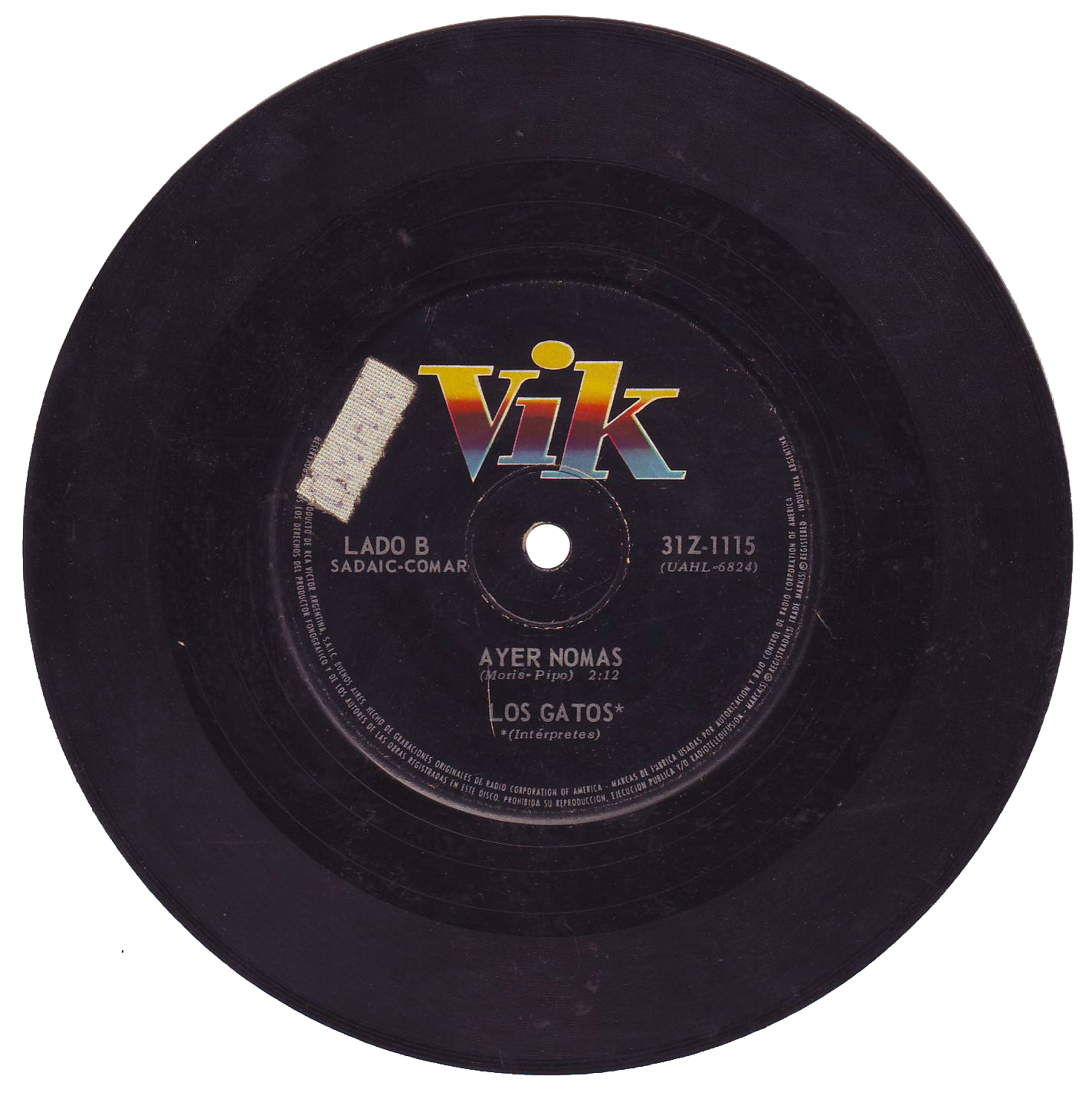
A-side and B-side of the 7-inch single, released under RCA Victor's Vik label. Tanguito can be seen credited as "Ramsés" on the former, while the latter features Moris and Pipo Lernoud's "Ayer nomás".

"La balsa" was released on July 3, 1967 on Vik, a subsidiary of RCA Victor, with "Ayer nomás" as its B-side. The band chose to release those songs so that Tanguito, Moris and Lernoud could become members of the Argentine Society of Music Authors and Composers (SADAIC), since it was required to have a recorded work. Tanguito is credited under the stage name Ramsés; according to Nebbia, "he was ashamed of his monicker 'Tanguito', because it was a pejorative term that had been put to him in the neighborhood, he was looking for something more exotic. Then Ciro Fogliatta, who read much about the Egyptians and pharaohs, came up with [Ramsés] and Tango liked it." The music sheet for the song was first published by Fermata in August 1967. Some sources state the label first suggested that radio stations play "Ayer nomás", but after a positive response to "La balsa" from some Rosario stations, RCA Victor decided to put more effort into the promotion of the song. Upon release, Los Gatos promoted the record for several nights by walking to radio stations, "trying to convince" disc jockeys to play it. Initially sales were not high, but after a couple of months, the single grew in popularity by word of mouth and began to "peak" (Spanish: picar, a term used by the record industry). Seeing this, RCA Victor invested in an advertising campaign that boosted the record's sales.

That spring, the increasingly high sales of "La balsa" led the band back to TNT Studios to record their first LP record. The self-titled album, released at the end of 1967, built on the popularity of the single and was also a commercial success. Recognized for including "La balsa" as its opening track, the LP has been reissued under the song's title in modern times. The popularity of "La balsa" continued through early 1968—being described as the summer hit of the year—and sold in total an approximate of 250,000 copies, an impressive number for that time that was unprecedented for Spanish-language rock music. The single got high airplay and was played on heavy rotation. It was also successful in several other Latin American countries. Nebbia has stated: "In all the countries that it came out it came first in sales. In Bolivia they sold stickers with our photos!" As a result, in 1968 Los Gatos became leading figures of Argentine popular music, making numerous performances throughout the country, releasing three more studio albums, and undergoing a tour of two and a half months through Paraguay, Bolivia, Uruguay and Brazil. In the latter, the band took part in Rio de Janeiro's Festival Internacional da Canção and performed in Roberto Carlos' TV show. Regarding the success following the release of "La balsa", drummer Oscar Moro recalled: "In all that time we worked a lot. For example, in carnivals we had 35 shows in 8 days! It was crazy!"

== Impact and aftermath ==
=== Beginning of Argentine rock ===
Los Gatos in September 1968, on the front cover of Pinap, the first rock magazine of Argentina. The success of "La balsa" sparked the emergence of new bands, music festivals and publications focusing on the movement.

Although Los Beatniks had pioneered rock music sung in Spanish a year before with their song "Rebelde", the single was a commercial failure, selling only 200 copies. "La balsa", on the other hand, became an international hit, establishing the commercial viability of rock music sung in Spanish, and turning what originally was an underground scene into a widespread youth culture phenomenon. The high sales of the single were also impressive considering that up to that point, Buenos Aires had been characterized by its traditional and orthodox musical preferences, favoring tango and folk music. Journalist Juan Manuel Strassburger wrote in 2007: "The impact is even clearer when compared to what was offered by the young music market of the time. [...] These new rockers formed a different way of feeling young: accessible, but also countercultural." According to Iván Adaime of AllMusic, the song brought rock en español "to the wider audiences", and became one of the scene's most ubiquitous tracks. The success of "La balsa" turned Los Gatos into "the motor nerve of the movement," creating an audience for the emerging Argentine rock and paving the way for various new bands, the most notorious being Almendra and Manal. These two groups were also products of the countercultural environment of Buenos Aires, and divided the musical panorama by synthesizing two different sides of the city. Almendra made an impact for its surrealism and poetic sophistication, while Manal featured a blues style with urban themed lyrics. Los Gatos, Almendra and Manal are now considered the foundational trilogy of Argentine rock and, by extension, of rock in español in general, as they "communed an authentic, young, serious and artistic [Spanish-language] rock" that was unprecedented. Almendra leader Luis Alberto Spinetta told author Juan Carlos Diez in 2006:

[Los Gatos] were a very good thing because they were the example that [Spanish-language rock] could be done. I believe that "La balsa" was a great inspiration for everyone. And also other tracks of Los Gatos. Each track contained a mystery that, at the same time, was a poetic motivation, a great incentive for us. I liked Litto's ideas and the concept that the group had for playing. They have been a constant influence, somehow. Litto Nebbia was an inspirer, an elementary motor of all this. When you approached him, you realized everything he knew and everything he was going to give.

"La balsa" acted as the kick starter of the consolidation process of a national rock culture. Several record companies took note of the movement, and, beginning in the summer of 1968, "there was no label that did not want to have its own group of shipwrecked in the catalog." This so-called "beat music" (Spanish: "música beat") subsequently "flooded" the market between 1968 and 1970. According to Víctor Pintos, "Los Gatos changed the focus of attention to the artists that had passed through La Cueva." This "scouting race" generated the first professional circuit of Argentine rock, as specialized magazines, festivals and record labels emerged and fed the phenomenon. As a result, and in a matter of months, Tanguito and Miguel Abuelo signed with CBS, as did for other big labels artists that did not come from La Cueva but "shared a similar ethic and ways of feeling music", such as Alma y Vida, Arco Iris and Almendra. At the same time, the first publications dedicated to the movement appeared, including the magazines Pinap, Cronopios and later Pelo; while general interest magazines such as Gente, Primera Plana and Panorama wrote on the phenomenon as well.

However, some of the protagonists of the movement saw the massification of Spanish-language rock as a "defeat". According to Kreimer, "society made room for young people who wanted to join the party of distraction, but not for content that reflected real questions and cravings"; noting that there was no awareness of "a larger collective, nor a countercultural spirit."

=== Hippie movement ===
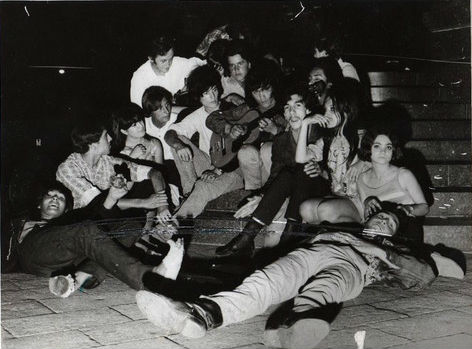
Tanguito—accompanied by hippies—playing the guitar in Plaza Francia, a popular meeting place for the porteño counterculture of the 1960s

"La balsa" became a hymn for the burgeoning Argentine hippie movement of Plaza Francia, with its adherents calling themselves "náufragos" (English: "the shipwrecked" or "castaways") in reference to the song. On September 21, 1967—the date of both Student Day and Spring Day in Argentina—Lernoud, Hernán Pujó and Mario Rabey organized a reunion at Plaza San Martín to evidence the arrival of the hippie movement in Buenos Aires, which gathered around 250 young porteños. Lernoud recalled in 2006: "We had to find a way to stop being arrested, because there were already many boys with long hair in Buenos Aires, we were not alone. Since "La balsa", the public began to be seen, and the fact that in the neighborhoods there were boys [like that]." He also described the event as "a publicity stunt of something that already existed, so that—for example—people would know that the long-haired boy they saw on the street was a hippie who wanted peace." The high attendance was sparked by the popularity of "La balsa" and "Ayer nomás", thus Tanguito had a leading role in these kind of gatherings. Much of the press focused on them, including La Razón, Gente, Siete Días and Así. The latter made a series of publications about the hippies of Buenos Aires, with one of the interviewees stating: "We are not hippies, but castaways. This is the current version of a sociological-literary movement founded by Allen Ginsberg and Jack Kerouac. I came to this after passing and overcoming other philosophical stages that would become the four paths to reach the Human Truth: yoga, Zen Buddhism, sabat (a fighting doctrine) and karate." Así was later closed in 1970 by the military dictatorship, declaring that it was "characterized by a sensationalism that does not stop to profit from the lowest instincts and passions", and a threat to "morality, modesty and good manners." In a contemporary article, Primera Plana reported that in October 1967, "the number of hippies was estimated at about 200, with preponderance of males: most were middle-class adolescents, who studied or had studied". By November, they "spread out in neighborhoods that had not yet known their customs and appearances". For instance, several bars on Avenida Corrientes became crowded with young, bohemian people.

Unlike the United States, there was no police tolerance for the social phenomenon, and by early 1968, police persecution and anti-hippie sentiment had also grown. The press denounced hippies as a "metropolitan plague" and reported on an "anti-hippie war", with the Argentine Federation of Anti-Communist Democratic Entities (FAEDA) becoming the visible head of the campaign. FAEDA had few members, but relied on subsidies from the U.S. embassy and related entities that had contact with the Secretariat of Intelligence. At the end of January 1968, Primera Plana convened young representatives of FAEDA and the hippie movement of Buenos Aires—among them Tanguito—to debate. FAEDA's Amadeo Tedesco asked Tanguito: "You say that you do not form a group. Why then it is heard about a Tanguito group?", to which he replied: "Suddenly you are in a square, with a guitar, as I have been. There are 20 people, grouped or not, but they are there. I never said that the group is mine; I only now find out about that." During the debate, the hippies were accused of promoting the "destruction of the family, morals, feelings and tradition"; and corruption of minors through the drug Dexamyl. The police extended the persecution to barrios such as Retiro, Palermo and Floresta, and FAEDA declared that the number of hippies was between 2,500 and 2,800. The persecution in Buenos Aires caused the dispersion of the movement, most notably to the beaches of Buenos Aires Province—where anti-hippie attacks were even more serious—and El Bolsón in Patagonia; the latter was particularly populated by the sector of the movement that championed a communal, environmentally friendly life. Hippyism remained popular in the early 1970s, as the American movement gained much visibility through various mainstream and underground media, like the documentary Woodstock. The most notable hippie communes that appeared in Greater Buenos Aires in the late 1960s are the bands Arco Iris and La Cofradía de la Flor Solar, psychedelic bands that shaped Argentine rock's second generation.

== Authorship controversy ==
"La balsa" (Tanguito version)
Sample of Tanguito's solo version of "La balsa", recorded in 1970 and released posthumously three years later. It includes the famous phrase spoken by Manal's Javier Martínez, which installed the controversy regarding the song's authorship.

There has been much discussion over who wrote "La balsa" and, "for those who the answer is that it was coauthored between Nebbia and Tanguito, the question lies in who was the fundamental mind of such a creation." Santiago Montiveros of MDZ Online described it as "the most widespread and controversial debate that the history of rock nacional has given." The controversy began after the 1973 post-mortem release of Tanguito's only studio album, Tango, which compiled songs he recorded for Mandioca Records between 1969 and 1971, including a version of "La balsa". In the track, before starting to perform, Tanguito can be heard jokingly stating "Let's play a commercial song", followed by Javier Martínez urging him to play "La balsa", alleging that "[it] is yours". The phrase "In the bathroom of La Perla de Once you composed 'La balsa'", said by Martínez in a "sinister and sententious" way, is looped until Tanguito starts playing. Clarín felt that the song's lyrics "are heard differently when it is known that the one who sings them ended up under a train, gripped by hard drugs and the effects of electroshock." Mariano del Mazo of Página/12 wrote: "Thus was born—with that record and that phrase, more than with his death—the first martyr of Argentine rock: a modest martyr, corresponding to a ghetto, a marginal music." The repeated statement spoken by Martínez established the iconic status of La Perla, and installed the myth that Nebbia stole the song from Tanguito, taking advantage of his "madness and ingenuity". As a result, Nebbia earned the hatred of many suburban rock fans during the 1970s. After the disbandment of Los Gatos in 1970, Nebbia refused to perform the song live because he did not want to "develop [his] career based on hits, clichés or labels." This decision became stronger after the authorship controversy, and he did not perform the song until 2001. Martínez denied the myth in 2007, on the occasion of the single's 40th anniversary, stating:

Journalism and show business work with controversy, and that is why that phrase I said in Tango's album was misunderstood. In the bathroom of La Perla de Once you composed "La balsa". I did not mean that he was the only author, that is a myth. The truth of the matter is that both of them wrote it, Nebbia and Tango, and I was an eyewitness at a table in La Perla. Tango showed the first part to Litto, and the next day he brought the rest. This is how "La balsa" was born.

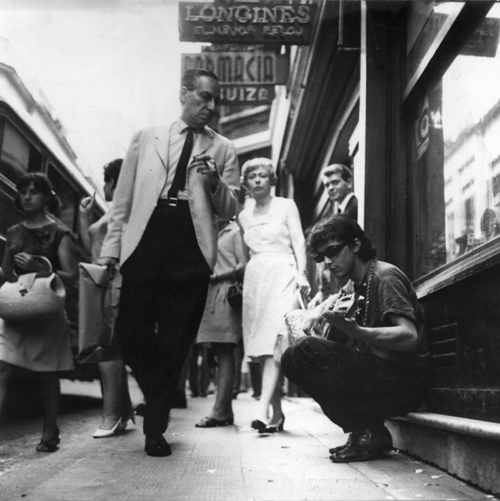
Tanguito playing the guitar on the street in 1968, following the success of "La balsa"

The polemic was revived in 1993, after the release of Tango Feroz, a biopic by Marcelo Piñeyro that focused on Tanguito. The film suggested that Tanguito had written the entirety of the song, and that Nebbia only embellished it. In a particular scene, Tanguito's character is shown listening to his song on a shopping gallery and, heavily shocked by the changes, breaks everything around him. The box office success of the film attracted the attention of the media, which focused extensively on Tanguito's myth. In his 2004 book Una mirada: reflexiones & anécdotas de vida, Nebbia criticised the historical inaccuracy and "[ruthlessness]" of the film, writing: "They never really wanted to know how things were like, nor did they want to accept what kind of character Tanguito was. Simply because this was against the image they needed to make the film a commercial success. The old trick of the movies about rock singers who died in a tragic and strange way." In an article for Página/12 regarding the 2013 musical theatre adaptation of Tango Feroz, Pipo Lernoud was highly critical of the film, writing that "it is a pity that once again the legend of the Christ-like and solitary saint hides the collective creative work and turns a wonderful experience into a product for the capitalist market". Both Nebbia and Lernoud felt that the film's plot was the filmmakers' revenge for not having allowed them to use their songs in the soundtrack. Lernoud further wrote:

Where are Tanguito's songs in Tango Feroz? Where is Tanguito? Where are the friends of Tanguito, initiators of rock nacional? [...] What saddens me the most is that in this fraudulent story the spirit of collective creation that gave origin to rock nacional is lost. [...] The rock from here is the product of a shared creation in long discussions about books and films, science fiction and accursed literature, jazz and bossa nova, tango and blues, scientists and poets. [...] Part of the painful corporatization of rock is this fraudulent story, intentionally distorted, that the media celebrates as they celebrate the rock opera Evita. Not everything is sold, but the legend of Tanguito is.

In 2011, when asked about the controversy, Nebbia replied: "[Tanguito] began writing 'I'm very lonely and sad in this world of shit'. He didn't know how to follow the song. He played everything in one tone, in E, because he didn't know how to play. All the rest of the song, the lyrics and the music, I did it. Then we both registered it, because we actually were two co-authors, it does not matter that one has made 90 percent." Regarding Javier Martínez' phrase in Tanguito's version of the song, Nebbia replied: "They are the follies of some people who don't like me. The one that put it is Jorge Álvarez (director of the Mandioca label), a producer who is a lout. I never went to ask them anything."

== Legacy ==
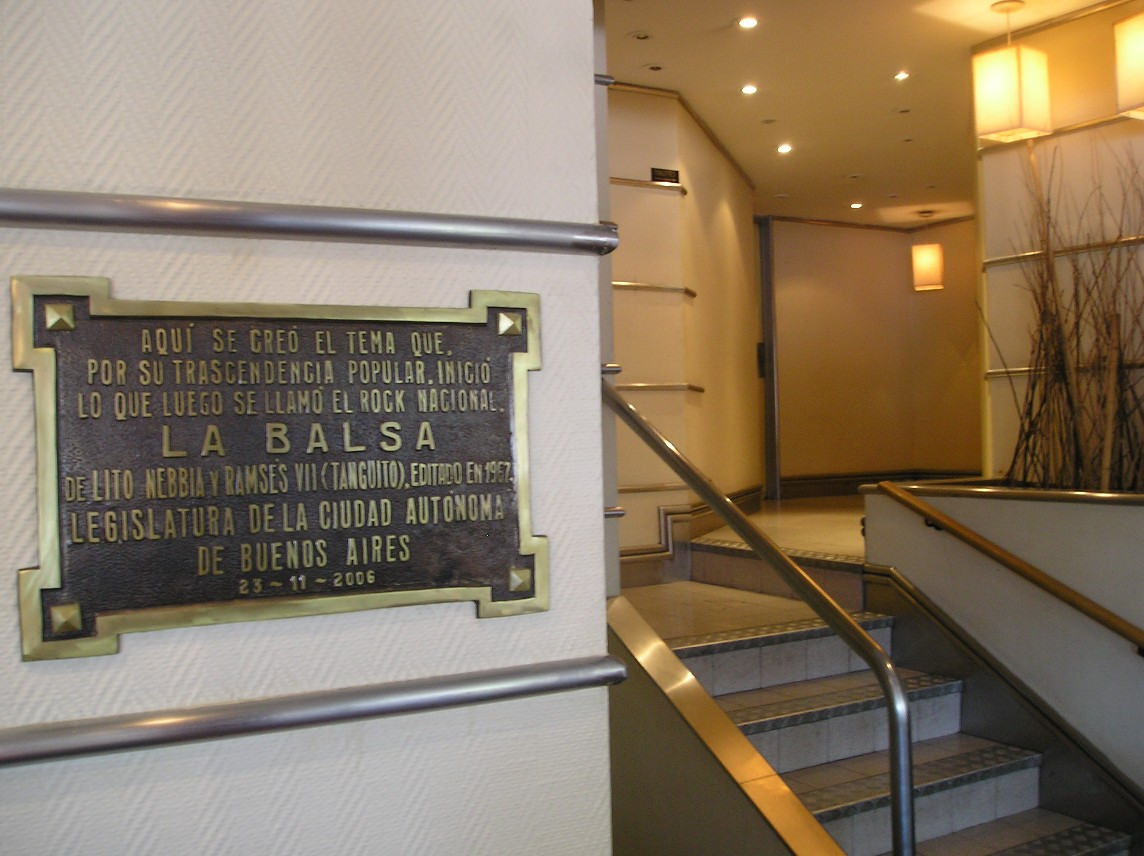
Plaque placed inside La Perla, in the corridor leading to the men's toilet where Litto Nebbia and Tanguito composed "La balsa". It reads: "Here was created the song that because of its popular transcendence began what was later called national rock".

"La balsa" is recognized as one of the most important and influential releases of rock en español, with some authors considering it to be its founder. The web radio NoFm stated in 2015: "If we think of rock made in Spanish as a specific movement within the vast world of rock, we would undoubtedly find its origin in Argentina. It was there where, for the first time, being contemporaries to those now considered 'founding fathers', Spanish-speaking youths developed their own sound identity, with a rock clearly differentiated from that of England or the United States." The release of the single is generally considered to be the origin of Argentine rock (known locally as rock nacional), and its history has since attained a legendary status within Argentine popular culture. The emergence of Argentine rock was fundamental for the development of a Latin American rock scene. The success of "La balsa" "installed forever in the country the idea that rock music could be composed in Spanish." J.C. Maraddón of Diario Alfil wrote in 2016:

Until then, those who committed the folly of singing [rock music] in our language had bad press. They were considered cheesy and were syndicated as a bad copy of the original, which would always prevail. But the feat of Los Gatos changed that concept and reversed the terms of the equation: the songs of the Argentine rockers were adding prestige, until two decades later those interpreters became the most respected and most heard of all the music produced in the country.

The song has been covered by several artists in various languages—according to Nebbia himself, over a hundred—including Catalan, German and Portuguese. Some musicians that have covered "La balsa" include Charly García, Los Corvets, Gervasio, Miguel Abuelo, Andrés Calamaro, Los Manolos, Juanse (of Ratones Paranoicos), Gato Pérez, Los Iracundos, Moris, Sonora Borinquen, Los Encargados, Los Zorros (featuring Pity Álvarez), Las Cuatro Monedas, Hilda Lizarazu and Jairo (in a French version titled "Le train du sud"). Charly García references "La balsa" in the song "Peluca telefónica", included in his 1982 debut solo album Yendo de la cama al living.

In an Encuentro documentary TV episode focused on the song, Nebbia stated:

I think that song appeared at a time that harmoniously coincided with a need that had, first of all our generation, and also with a thing that transcended borders because a lot of stuff was happening in the world with these generations. Stuff was happening in Brazil, the United States, Mexico, France... with politics, New Journalism, Cinema Novo, the hippie movement, Woodstock. There was a lot of things happening that said: Well, this is the moment when you have to present a letter of "I do something different standing in front of life." And this song appeared, also with the personal sound that we achieved with the group, with a different way of singing, with different images to talk about a theme that is eternal: freedom. And I think that's what happened with the song. And while the time has passed, the song is becoming more and more of a legend, so... Saving the distances, if you ask someone which is their favorite Beethoven composition he tells you the Fifth Symphony. It's not like that, but the diffusion that that work has is incredible. Well, humbly, "La balsa" is the song that, as each year passes, is better known all over the world as something that happened here and that happens.

According to writer Carlos Polimeni, the song's organ introduction is as well known in the Southern Cone as the guitar riff that starts the Rolling Stones' "(I Can't Get No) Satisfaction". Polimeni also argued that, "to a large extent, "La balsa" was for rock in Spanish what "Blowin' in the Wind" was for American and British rock." Likewise, Rock.com.ar wrote that, "Ciro Fogliatta's organ contribution in this track is as important as Al Kooper's in the original version of "Like a Rolling Stone" by Bob Dylan." In a July 1985 survey by journalist Carlos Polimeni for Clarín, "La balsa" was selected as one of the greatest records of Argentine rock by respondents León Gieco, Daniel Grinbank, Jorge Brunelli and Raúl Porchetto. In 2002, MTV and the Argentine edition of Rolling Stone listed "La balsa" as the greatest song in the history of Argentine rock. The song also reached the 40th spot in Al Borde's list of The 500 Most Important Songs of Ibero-American Rock; and the 5th spot in Rock.com.ar's 2005 list of the Top 100 Argentinean Songs of the Last 40 Years. In 1994, the Government of Buenos Aires declared the La Perla del Once bar a Site of Cultural Interest, with its plaque reading: "Place frequented by young musicians in the 1960s who gestated the first compositions of national rock."

In a tribute concert to rock nacional, which inaugurated the Argentine Bicentennial celebrations on May 21, 2010, "La balsa" was performed as the closing song by Nebbia and Fito Páez, joined by all the artists that had performed that evening.

== See also ==
- List of best-selling singles by country
- Cultural impact of the Beatles – overview of the cultural influence of the band during the 1960s.
- Psychedelic rock in Latin America – overview of the regional scene of psychedelic rock that emerged during the 1960s.
- Latin rock – musical style that combines Latin American music with rock, and should not be confused with rock en español.
- Latin music – catch-all term to describe any music that is sung in Spanish or Portuguese from the Hispanophone and Lusophone world.
- La Onda – countercultural movement of the late 1960s and early 1970s that took place in Mexico, led by the so-called "jipitecas".
- Tropicália – concurring countercultural movement that developed in the Southeast Region of Brazil.
- La Noche de los Bastones Largos – emblematic event of Argentine student activism and military repression of July 29, 1966.

== Bibliography ==
- Alabarces, Pablo (November 1, 1993). Entre gatos y violadores: el rock nacional en la cultura argentina (in Spanish). Colihue. ISBN 9505812434.
- Fernandez Bitar, Marcelo Daniel (November 1, 2015). 50 años de rock en Argentina (in Spanish). Penguin Random House. ISBN 978-9500754170.
- González, Yanko (2013). La construcción histórica de la juventud en América Latina: Bohemios, Rockanroleros y Revolucionarios (in Spanish). Cuarto Propio. ISBN 978-9562606400.
- Cantilo, Miguel (2000). Chau loco!: los hippies en la Argentina de los setenta (in Spanish). Editorial Galerna. ISBN 978-9505564040.
- A tres bandas: Mestizaje, sincretismo e hibridación en el espacio sonoro latinoamericano (in Spanish). Akal. 2010. ISBN 978-84-460-3225-0.
- Margulis, Mario (1997). La cultura de la noche: la vida nocturna de los jóvenes en Buenos Aires (in Spanish). Editorial Biblos. ISBN 9789507861451. ISSN 0185-4186.
- Daniel, James (June 2003). Violencia, proscripción y autoritarismo 1955–1976 (PDF) (in Spanish). Sudamericana. ISBN 950-07-2344-1.
- Scaturchio, Fabio (January 2014). Yo soy Buenos Aires (in Spanish). Editorial Dunken. ISBN 9789870270300.
- Podalsky, Laura (June 2004). Specular City: Transforming Culture, Consumption, and Space in Buenos Aires, 1955–1973. Temple University Press. ISBN 978-1-56639-948-7.
- Manzano, Valeria (2014). ""Y, ahora, entre gente de clase media como uno…". Culturas juveniles, drogas y política en la Argentina, 1960-1980" (PDF). Historia y problemas del siglo XX (in Spanish). Vol. 5, no. 5. Contemporánea. pp. 85–104. ISSN 1688-7638.
- Plotkin, Pablo (June 2016). "Música para naufragios". Rolling Stone Argentina (in Spanish). No. 219. Publirevistas. La Nación S. A. pp. 52–68 and 113. ISSN 0329-5656.
- Polimeni, Carlos (2002). Bailando sobre los escombros: historia crítica del rock latinoamericano (in Spanish). Editorial Biblos. ISBN 978-9507862984.
