= Tango (Tanguito album) =

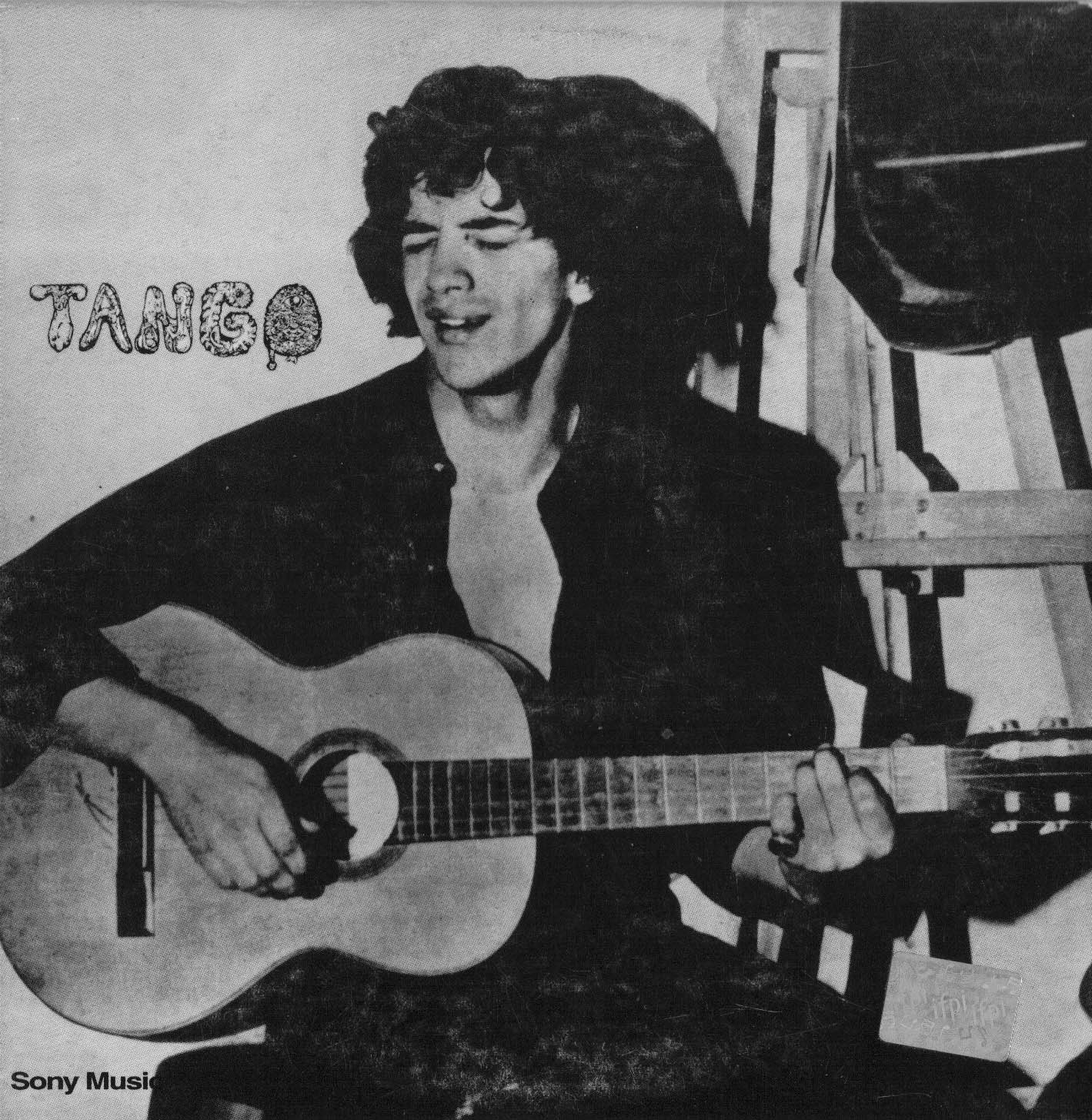

Studio album by Tango
- Released: 1973
- Recorded: 1969–1970
- Studio: TNT Studios, Buenos Aires
- Genre: Psychedelic folk
- Length: 37:29
- Language: Spanish
- Label: Talent-Microfon
- Producer: Horacio Martínez; Jorge Álvarez

Tango chronology
Tango (1973)	Yo soy Ramsés (2009)

Tango is the only studio album by Argentine singer-songwriter Tanguito, recorded in 1970 and released posthumously in 1973 on Talent Records.

In 2007, the Argentine edition of Rolling Stone ranked it fifty-sixth on its list of "The 100 Greatest Albums of Argentine Rock".

== Background and recording ==
The album was recorded between 1969 and 1970 at TNT Studios, Buenos Aires and featured Tanguito accompanied only by his acoustic guitar, while Javier Martínez served as the producer and spoke to him from the control room. Originally, Tanguito was going to record with the members of Manal—Martínez, Claudio Gabis and Alejandro Medina—but he did not show up for any of the two days that they were cited in the studio.

== Release ==
The songs "La balsa" and "Amor de primavera" were released as a single within a "flood" of releases by Mandioca in 1970. Simultaneously, "Natural" was included in the label's compilation album Pidamos peras a Mandioca, which featured several artists from Argentine rock's first generation, such as Manal, Pappo, Vox Dei, Alma y Vida, Moris, Billy Bond and La Cofradía de la Flor Solar.

The recordings of Tanguito for Mandioca were eventually released as an LP record, Tango, in 1973 on Talent-Microfón, successor of Mandioca. The album was largely unnoticed when it was released, partly due to the poor quality of the recordings.

== Track listing ==
All tracks are written by Tanguito except where noted.

Side one
No.	Title	Length
1.	"Natural"	2:11
2.	"Todo el día me pregunto" (Javier Martínez)	3:52
3.	"El despertar de un refugio atómico"	7:22
4.	"Diamantes de espuma"	3:11

Side two
No.	Title	Length
5.	"Amor de primavera" (Tanguito and Hernán Pujó)	3:33
6.	"Jinete"	5:12
7.	"Balada de Ramsés VII"	6:12
8.	"La balsa" (Tanguito and Litto Nebbia)	5:56
Total length:		37:29

== See also ==
- 1970 in music
- 1973 in music
