= Los Gatos Salvajes =

Argentine beat/garage rock band

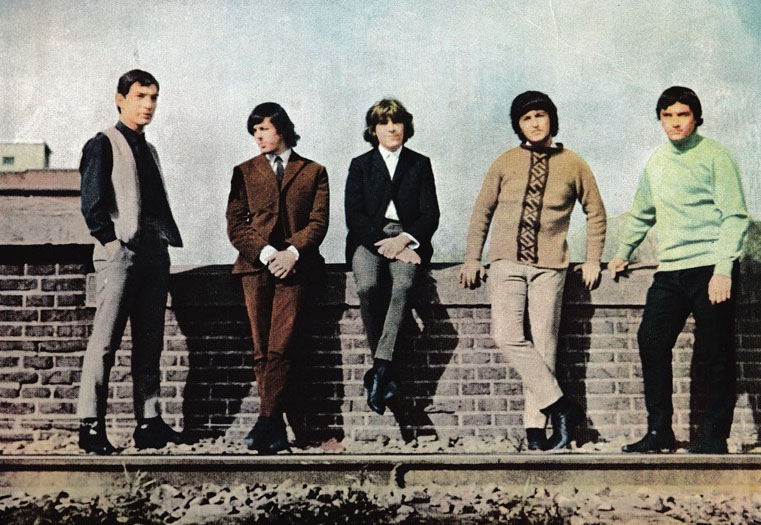
- Los Gatos Salvajes in 1965

Background information
- Also known as: The Wild Cats
- Origin: Rosario, Santa Fe Province, Argentina
- Genres: Beat; garage rock; nueva ola
- Years active: 1964–1966
- Label: Music Hall
- Past members: Ciro Fogliatta; Rubén Rojas; Juan Carlos Pueblas; Jose "Turco" Adjaiye; Litto Nebbia; Guillermo Romero; Alfredo Toth

Los Gatos Salvajes, from Rosario, Santa Fe in Argentina, were a beat and garage rock band active in the early to mid-1960s, following which members Litto Nebbia and Ciro Fogliatta would go on to form the later, more successful group, Los Gatos. They were one of Argentina's first teenage rock and roll bands, and part of the popular worldwide beat movement inspired by the success of the Beatles and the British Invasion. They enjoyed only limited record sales, despite some degree of success in their television appearances, but are recognised as a pioneering group in Argentina.

== History ==
The band was founded in 1962 by keyboardist Ciro Fogliatta. He was joined by Rubén Rojas on vocals, Juan Carlos "Chango" Pueblas on guitar, and Ricardo Bellini on drums. In 1963 Guillermo Romero would join on bass, and Jose "Tito" Adjaiye would replace Bellini. The original name of the band was The Wild Cats and they were influenced by The Beatles, The Rolling Stones, and The Yardbirds. Rubén Rojas was replaced by singer Litto Nebbia, who also played harmonica. At Nebbia's request they translated their name into Spanish and became Los Gatos Salvajes, and began performing songs in their native language. In 1963 they would release their first single "Oye niña"/"Calculadora".

As their popularity increased, Los Gatos Salvajes eventually re-located to Buenos Aires, and made a strong impression through a series of television appearances through which they were able to appeal to young rock fans in the metropolis. Their popularity on TV led to a record deal. After several singles, Los Gatos Salvajes released their first (and only) LP, the self-titled Los Gatos Salvajes in 1965. Sales for the album were disappointing due to poor promotion by the label, which was financially struggling. The album sold less than a thousand copies before the company went broke.

Less than a year after it was released, Adjaiye, Pueblas and Romero decided it was time to return home to Rosario and the group broke up. Nebbia and Fogliatta stayed in Buenos Aires and assembled a new group, Los Gatos, which would enjoy greater commercial success, selling 200,000 copies of their debut single "La balsa." Los Gatos would come to be recognised as founders in the Argentine National Rock movement.

In 2007, a compilation, Los Gatos Salvajes: Complete Recordings, was released in the United States by No Fun Productions.

== Personnel ==
=== 1962 ===
- Rubén Rojas (vocals)
- Ciro Fogliatta (keyboards)
- Juan Carlos "Chango" Pueblas (guitar)
- Richard Bellini (drums)

=== 1963 ===
- Rubén Rojas (vocals)
- Ciro Fogliatta (keyboards)
- Juan Carlos "Chango" Pueblas (guitar)
- Guiermo Romero (bass)
- Jose “Tito” Adjaiye (drums)

=== 1964-1966 ===
- Litto Nebbia (vocals, harmonica)
- Ciro Fogliatta (keyboards)
- Juan Carlos "Chango" Pueblas (guitar)
- Guiermo Romero (bass)
- Jose "Tito" Adjaiye (drums)

== Discography ==
=== Albums ===
==== Studio ====
- Los Gatos Salvajes (Music Hall, 1965)

==== Compilations ====
- Bajo la rambla (1994)
- Los Gatos Salvajes (reedición), (200

=== Singles ===
- "Donde vas", 1965
