= Oscar Moro =

Argentine drummer

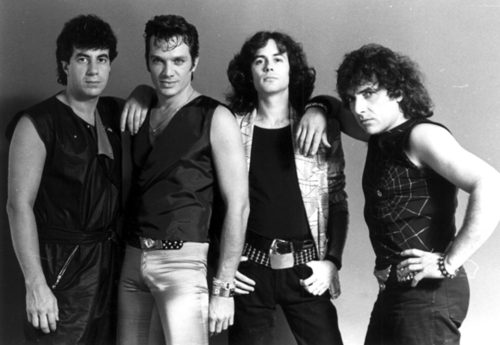
- Oscar Moro (Far left) with Riff

Background information
- Born: 24 January 1948; Rosario, Santa Fe, Argentina
- Died: 10 July 2006 (aged 58)
- Genres: Rock, Heavy metal, blues rock, rock 'n' roll, progressive rock
- Instrument: Drums
- Formerly of: Los Gatos; Color Humano; La Máquina de Hacer Pájaros; Serú Girán; Riff (Argentine band)

Oscar Moro (January 24, 1948 – July 11, 2006) was an Argentine rock drummer.

Oscar Moro was born and raised in Rosario. Moro joined a childhood friend, Litto Nebbia, and three others in forming the pioneer Argentine rock and roll band Los Gatos, in 1966. The group became known for their all-night performances, and composed most of their own songs, many in the well-known neighborhood café, "La Perla del Once" (facing Plaza Miserere). One such composition, "La balsa" ("The Raft"), was written at that location by Nebbia and the ill-fated songwriter Tanguito on May 2, 1967, and following its release on the RCA Victor label on July 3, sold over 250,000 copies. They were the first Argentine rock group to achieve renown outside their country, and their first albums became known as the birth of Argentine rock.

Los Gatos split in 1970, however. Moro then joined ex-Almendra guitarist Edelmiro Molinari in Color Humano, and in 1976, joined Charly García (keyboard and vocals) in two bands: La Máquina de Hacer Pájaros, and, starting in 1978, Serú Girán, the most popular Argentine rock band of their era. Following Serú Girán dissolution in 1982, he played professionally with León Gieco and others, exploring African rhythms with bassist 'Beto' Satragni in a 1982 crossover album.

Moro joined Alejandro Lerner in 1984 and Pappo's metal band, Riff, in 1985. His last band was called Revólver; Moro was already in bad health due to an ulcer aggravated by alcoholism. The noted drummer died in his Palermo neighborhood home in 2006 at age 58.
