= Tanguito =

Argentine singer-songwriter (1944–1972)

José Alberto Iglesias
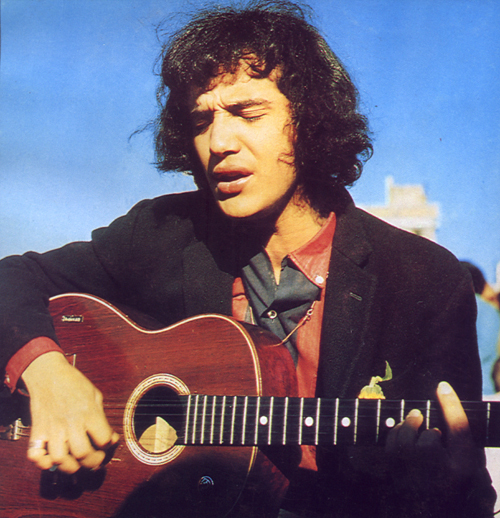
- Tanguito, c. 1970

Background information
- Also known as: Tanguito, Tango, Ramsés
- Born: José Alberto Iglesias; September 16, 1945; San Martín, Buenos Aires Province, Argentina
- Died: May 19, 1972 (aged 26); Buenos Aires, Argentina
- Genres: Rock; folk; pop
- Occupations: Singer; songwriter
- Instruments: Vocals; guitar
- Years active: 1965–1972

José Alberto Iglesias (September 16, 1944 – May 19, 1972), better known as Tango or its diminutive Tanguito or Ramses VII, was an Argentine rock singer-songwriter. Born into a working-class family from western Greater Buenos Aires, he began his career in the early 1960s as the lead singer of the nueva ola group Los Dukes, which recorded two singles released on label Music Hall. In the mid-to-late 1960s, he became a leading figure in the countercultural underground of Buenos Aires, a scene that gave birth to Argentine rock (known locally as rock nacional, Spanish for "national rock"), the earliest incarnation of Spanish-language rock. Tanguito is celebrated for co-writing Los Gatos' hit "La balsa", that catapulted the burgeoning rock nacional into massive popularity in the summer of 1967–68. This success led to a contract with RCA Victor which soon ended after the little impact of the 1968 single "El hombre restante". Tanguito later worked for Mandioca, Argentine rock's first independent record label founded by producers Jorge Álvarez and Pedro Pujó in 1968.

In the early 1970s, his amphetamine addiction worsened and deeply damaged his career and personal life. He was arrested on several occasions and later hospitalized at the Hospital Borda, where he was subjected to electroshock therapy. In May 1972, he was declared legally insane and transferred to a prison for psychopaths. That same month, Tanguito escaped and lost his life under the San Martín train. His only studio album, Tango, was posthumously released in 1973 and compiled his recordings for Mandioca between 1969 and 1970. The album turned Tanguito into a cult figure among suburban rock fans and installed the persistent myth that he had been the original author of "La balsa" and Litto Nebbia had taken advantage of his fragile state of mind. The musician later became a cultural icon as the subject of the 1993 film Tango Feroz, becoming the archetype of the tragic rock hero. In 2009, the archival album Yo soy Ramsés was released, which compiled unedited 1967 recordings for RCA Victor. In 2007, the Argentine edition of Rolling Stone ranked Tango fifty-sixth on its list of the "100 Best Albums of Argentine Rock".

== Biography ==
=== Early days ===
José Alberto Iglesias was born September 16, 1944, in the industrial town of San Martín, Buenos Aires Province. His family lived in a modest house in the town of Caseros, close to the city of Buenos Aires.

Iglesias showed no interest in school, and after flunking out at age 13 he tried different apprenticeships, including gardening school, but did not persevere. The only issue that held his interest was rock and roll. At age 17, José was a fixture of social ballrooms in the Mataderos and Flores neighborhoods, singing mostly rock and roll covers. He also gained local fame as a rock and roll dancer, while most people in the suburbs were tango dancers. To highlight this contrast, his friends started calling him "Tango" or "Tanguito" (the diminutive of "tango").

With his first band, Los Duques, he recorded a few covers and one original song in 1963.

=== La Cueva ===
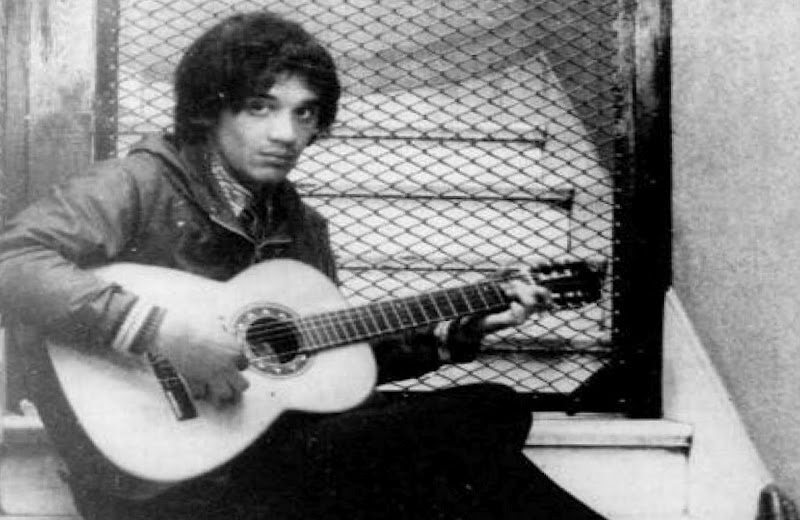
Tanguito with his guitar, circa 1967.

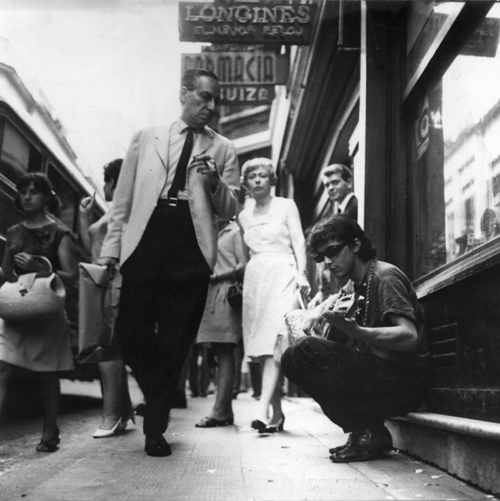
Tanguito playing guitar on the street, 1968.

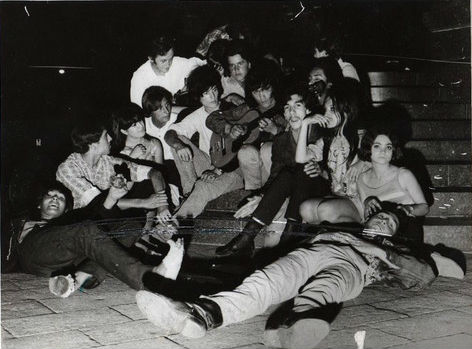
Tanguito playing guitar in Plaza Francia.

In 1965, Tanguito and his friend Horacio Martínez became regulars of a night club named La Cueva ("The Cave") in the Recoleta district. The club was to become the cradle of Argentine rock, with celebrities-to-be such as Moris, Sandro, and Litto Nebbia performing regularly, and other figures such as Pipo Lernoud, Miguel Grinberg and Miguel Abuelo sharing the limelight. Many of them were struggling with writing rock lyrics in Spanish, and Tanguito was initially perceived as a novelty act, who could sing energetic Elvis Presley covers in broken English.

The musicians would end the night by walking up Pueyrredón avenue together to have late supper or breakfast in café La Perla del Once in the Balvanera district. When Tanguito once ranted in the café's washroom about being alone and sad in the world, Nebbia encouraged him to write a song based on his refrain. Tanguito obliged, and Nebbia added a choir with a vaguely bossa nova air. That song would become the first mega-hit of Spanish language rock and roll: "La balsa" ("The raft"). Nebbia's band, Los Gatos, recorded it on June 19, 1967, and got a significant amount of radio play that helped the single sell over 250,000 copies. Both the name and the lyrics of the song may refer to José Feliciano's La Barca, and many of Tanguito's friends acknowledge that Tanguito had Feliciano's song on his mind.

Tanguito's own rendition was not immediately recorded, but was broadcast on national television a few months later, in a segment about the Buenos Aires version of the hippie phenomenon. The success of "Los Gatos" and Tanguito's status as co-composer of "La Balsa" hinted that a career break was around the corner, yet his first single, recorded January 18, 1968, was not marketed effectively by RCA and sales floundered.

During 1968, several songs by Tanguito, notably Amor de Primavera ("Spring Love"), were being covered or borrowed by emerging artists in the Argentine rock and roll scene. Tanguito would also take credit for other people's songs, including the ribald song "Errol Flynn" which was popular in the summer of 1968.

All of Tanguito's songs are credited to "Ramsés VII", one of his many pseudonyms, after the Egyptian Pharaoh Ramesses and Tango's affectation for seventh chords. Other pseudonyms he used from time to time include Susano Valdez and Drago (after a then-popular seltzer machine).

When Tanguito broke with RCA he found a new home in Mandioca, a label dedicated exclusively to rock, which immediately arranged for studio time. But he had trouble motivating himself to complete an album. Typically, Tanguito would record one or two song sketches alone with his guitar, or jam with available musicians, and disappear for days. By that time he had switched from alcohol and casual marijuana use to hard drugs, and was injecting amphetamines whenever he could afford them.

In those years, Argentine's police used hard-line tactics against drug addicts and had very little education about how to deal with them effectively. Tanguito would get arrested repeatedly for vagrancy or inebriation and be left unattended in a detention cell. One such episode in late 1970 was so damaging to his mental health that Tanguito became unable to recognize his friends, and was taken home by his mother for recovery.

=== Later days ===
In February 1971, Tanguito was arraigned and charged with heading a drug gang. Diagnosed as mentally insane, he was committed to the José T. Borda Neuropsychiatric Hospital, where he was submitted to insulin shock therapy and other treatments designed to wane him off the amphetamines. Instead of recovering, his mental health deteriorated and in 1972 he was committed to the hospital's long-term care facility.

Tanguito escaped from the hospital on the dawn of May 19, 1972. He managed to reach the Pacífico train station, where he apparently hoped to board a train to his parents' home in Caseros; at 10:50 am, he fell on the tracks and was fatally hit by an oncoming train.

== Influence and legacy ==
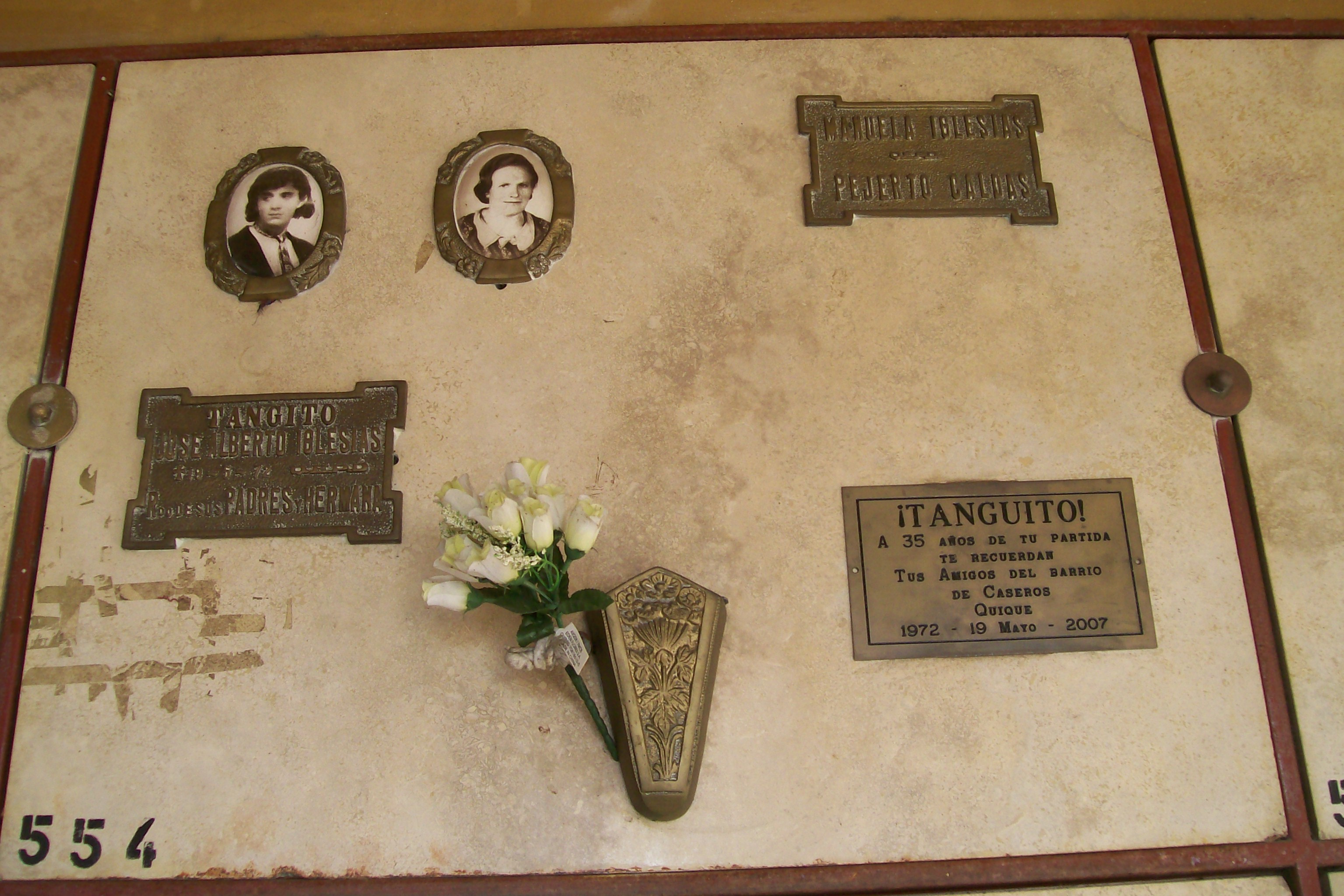
Tanguito is buried at General San Martín Partido cemetery of Greater Buenos Aires.

Argentine rock was to become a seminal influence in rock en español; Tanguito provided the first real hit of that movement as well as many sketches that were freely used by others. His brief but brilliant trajectory is recalled by many elder statesmen of Argentine rock as a main force in the early days, and as a sad reminder of the damage that drugs can wreak. Argentine author Miguel Grinberg, who was involved in that scene, has said that Tanguito influenced the transition of Argentine rock from English to Spanish more than anybody else.

In 1973, Tanguito's Mandioca recordings were published in an LP album named Tango. This album was released again in 1982 and 1993. The album's rendition of La Balsa has a spoken word introduction by Manal's Javier Martínez in which he repeats: "you composed La Balsa in the washroom of La Perla del Once". Martínez was in the studio for the recording but did not participate, and uttered the words for dramatic effect. The emphasis created friction with Nebbia, who felt that Mandioca was claiming Tanguito was the song's sole author. The rift subsided over time, but Nebbia remained a jealous custodian of his own rights.

Luis Alberto Spinetta covered Tanguito's Amor de Primavera and made that song a highlight of his concerts during the late 1970s and early 1980s.

In 1989, a television show named "Tanguito" starring Emilio Bardi was aired in the "Especiales de ATC" program on (Canal 7).

Director Marcelo Piñeyro directed his first feature film Tango Feroz ("Fierce Tango") in 1993, which became the top-grossing movie of the year in Argentina. The movie dramatized the life of a rock singer, obviously based on Tanguito, referring to the political and social climate of Argentina in the 1960s and early 1970s. Piñeyro did not obtain permission to use Tanguito's songs in the soundtrack, and was unable to get Nebbia to help researching Tanguito's life. He took artistic license in the plot of the movie, since the real-life Tanguito was not active politically and did not comment on the events that shook Argentina such as the 1969 Cordobazo, even though his "hippie" image might have influenced his ordeals with the police. His turbulent personal life and drug-related issues were also sanitized in the screenplay.

Spanish singer-songwriter pays tribute to Tanguito with his song of the same name "Tanguito", released originally on his 1999 album "Pensión Triana". One of the lines reads "Toma del escenario la madera necesaria, subíme de la mano y naufraguemos en tu balsa" which is Ruibal's gesture to Tanguito's song La balsa.
