= Color Humano =

Argentine rock group

- Origin: Buenos Aires, Argentina
- Genres: Psychedelic rock, Hard rock, Progressive rock
- Years active: 1971–1974; 1995–1998; 2009
- Labels: Microfon; Sony Music
- Past members: Edelmiro Molinari; Rinaldo Rafanelli; Oscar Moro; David Lebón

Color Humano was an Argentine rock group of the early 1970s.

== History ==
The dissolution of Almendra yielded three new outfits, one of them being Color Humano. This power trio was a solid rock group, which would in 1972 release their debut album Color Humano, following the Argentine rock etiquette of naming the first studio release after the band.

The album lacks a major hit single, presenting instead a mix of acoustic and hard rock tracks designed as a cohesive whole. Lebón subsequently departed the group and was replaced by Oscar Moro.

This change would shift the group's sound. Between March and June 1973, Color Humano recorded enough songs for a double album. Due to business decisions the album was released as two separate LPs on the newly created Talent label. The new set of songs were richer and more elaborate, spanning different rhythms and styles.

The albums Color Humano II and Color Humano III would sell well, and included a special participation of Raul Porchetto in several tracks, even as a singer. Yet the band did not do many live performances, which would begin to erode their popular following.

Color Humano's performance at the B.A. Rock Festival would be featured in the movie-documentary on Argentine rock "Rock hasta que se ponga el sol" ("Rock music till the sun goes down"). The band would disband in 1974, with members going on to groups such as Polifemo and La Máquina de Hacer Pájaros. They would celebrate a 20-year reunion in 1995.

== Discography ==
Singles

- "Hombre De Las Cumbres" / "Mañana Por La Noche" (1972)
- "A Través De Los Inviernos" / "Hace Casi Dos Mil Años" (1973)
- "Coto de caza" / "Las Historias Que Tengo" (1973)
- "Vestido De Agua" (1974)

Studio Albums

- Color Humano (1972)
- Color Humano 2 (1973)
- Color Humano 3 (1974)

Live Albums

- En el Roxy, live at the Roxy Club (1995)
