= Plaza Francia, Buenos Aires =

Square in Buenos Aires, Argentina

Coordinates: 34.5849426°S 58.3934543°W

Plaza Francia
- Public square
- {{{other_names}}}
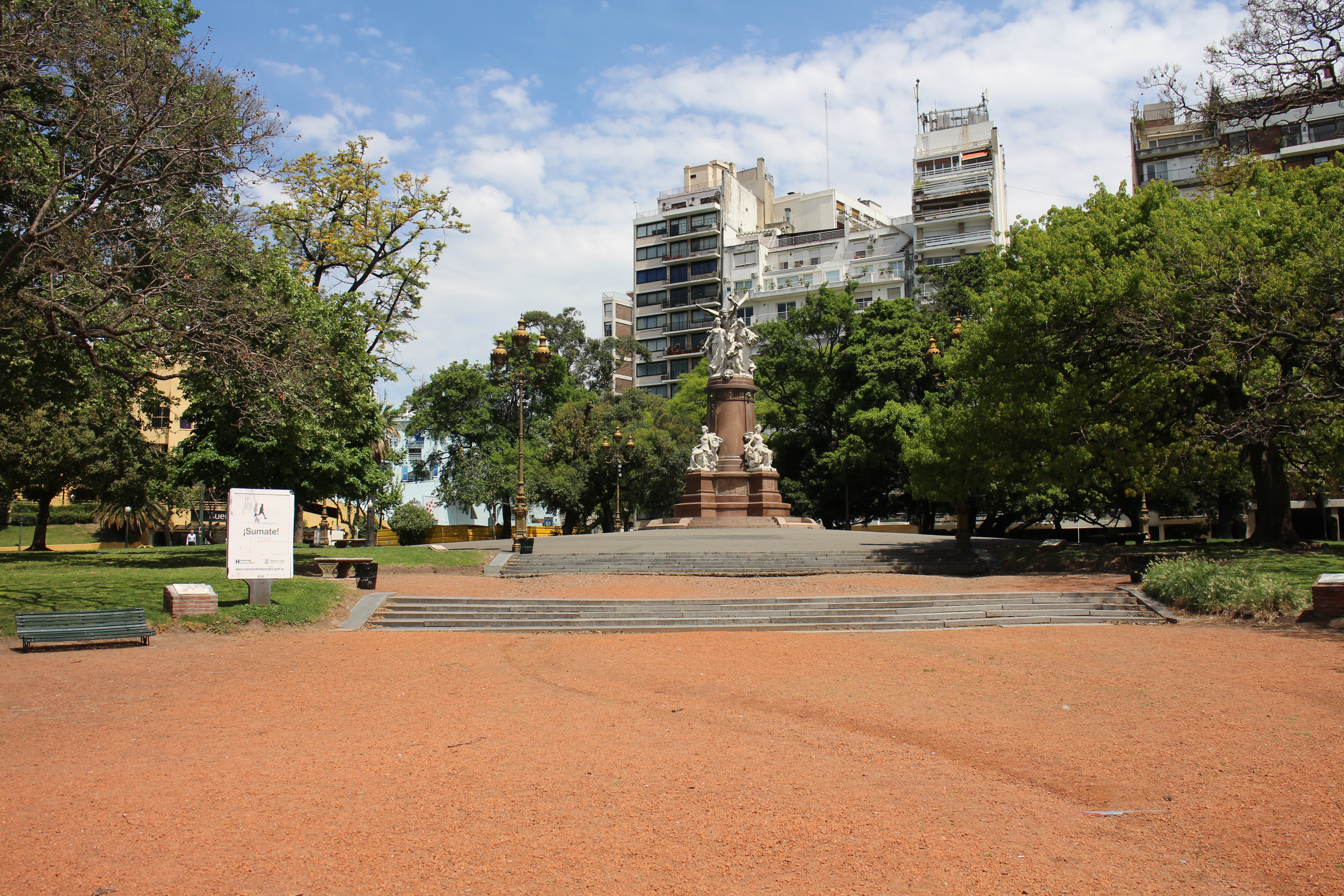
- Plaza Francia in October 2013
- Features: Monument of France to Argentina, Louis Braille Monument
- Design: Carlos Thays
- Opened: October 19, 1909
- Location: Avenida del Libertador, Recoleta; Buenos Aires, Argentina
- Interactive map of Plaza Francia

Plaza Francia (Spanish: "France Square") is a public square in the barrio of Recoleta in Buenos Aires, Argentina. The nearby Plaza Intendente Alvear is commonly but mistakenly known by the same name. It was created by a Municipal Ordinance on October 19, 1909, as part of the changes introduced in the urban landscape on the occasion of the Argentina Centennial. Designed by French landscape architect Carlos Thays, it is part of a broad set of squares including Plaza Intendente Alvear, Plaza San Martín de Tours, Plaza Juan XXIII, Plaza Ramón J. Cárcano, Plaza Dante and Plaza Rubén Darío, among others.

The square is dominated by Émile Peynot's Monument of France to Argentina, inaugurated in 1910 and gifted by the French community on the occasion of the Centennial.

The monument represents the ties between the two countries, including the republicanism and the similarities in their histories around 1800. Its four bas-reliefs in bronze evoke central facts of the history of both countries: the Primera Junta and the Crossing of the Andes for Argentina, and the Storming of the Bastille and Declaration of the Rights of Man and of the Citizen for France. The two female figures that crown the monument symbolize Argentina and France, guided by an angel that personifies Glory. The monument also features plaques that commemorate personalities of French origin: grenadier Domingo Porteau, who died during the Battle of San Lorenzo in the Argentine War of Independence, and writer Émile Zola. A monument to Louis Braille within Plaza Francia was inaugurated in 1977.

== Gallery ==
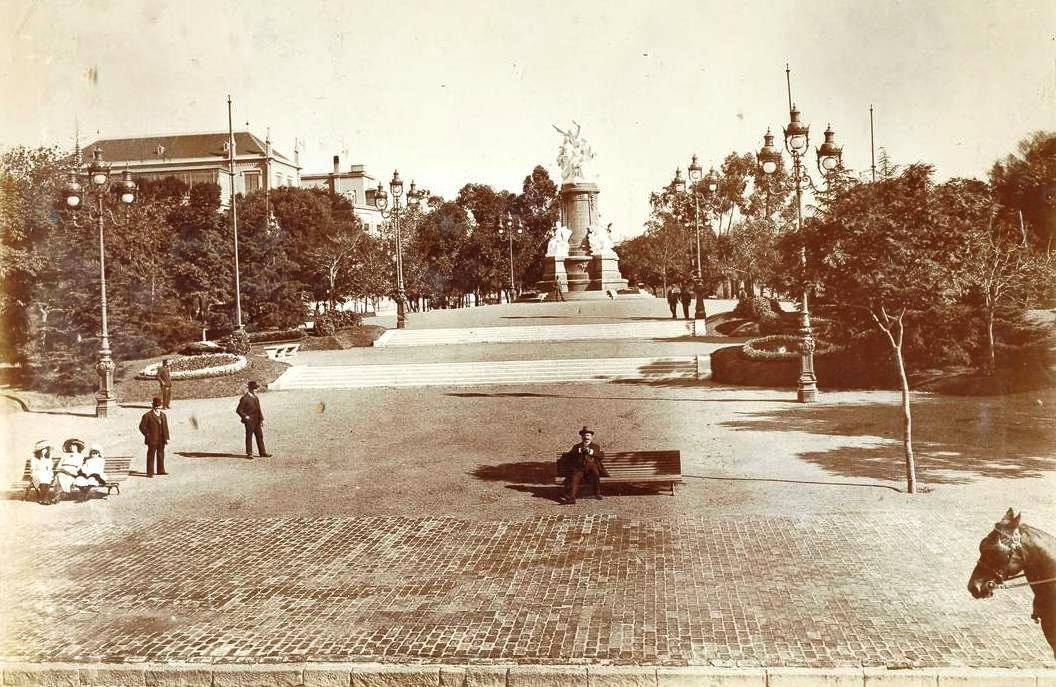
Landscape architect Carlos Thays—who designed the square—sitting on a bench of Plaza Francia in 1914.

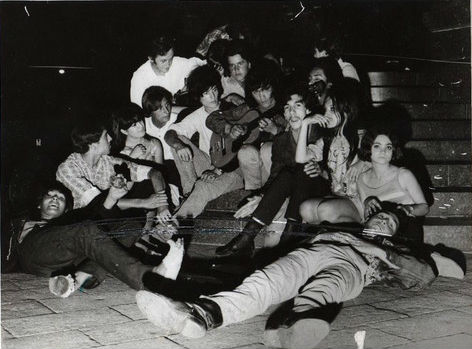
Tanguito—accompanied by hippies—playing the guitar in Plaza Francia, a popular meeting place for the porteño counterculture of the 1960s.

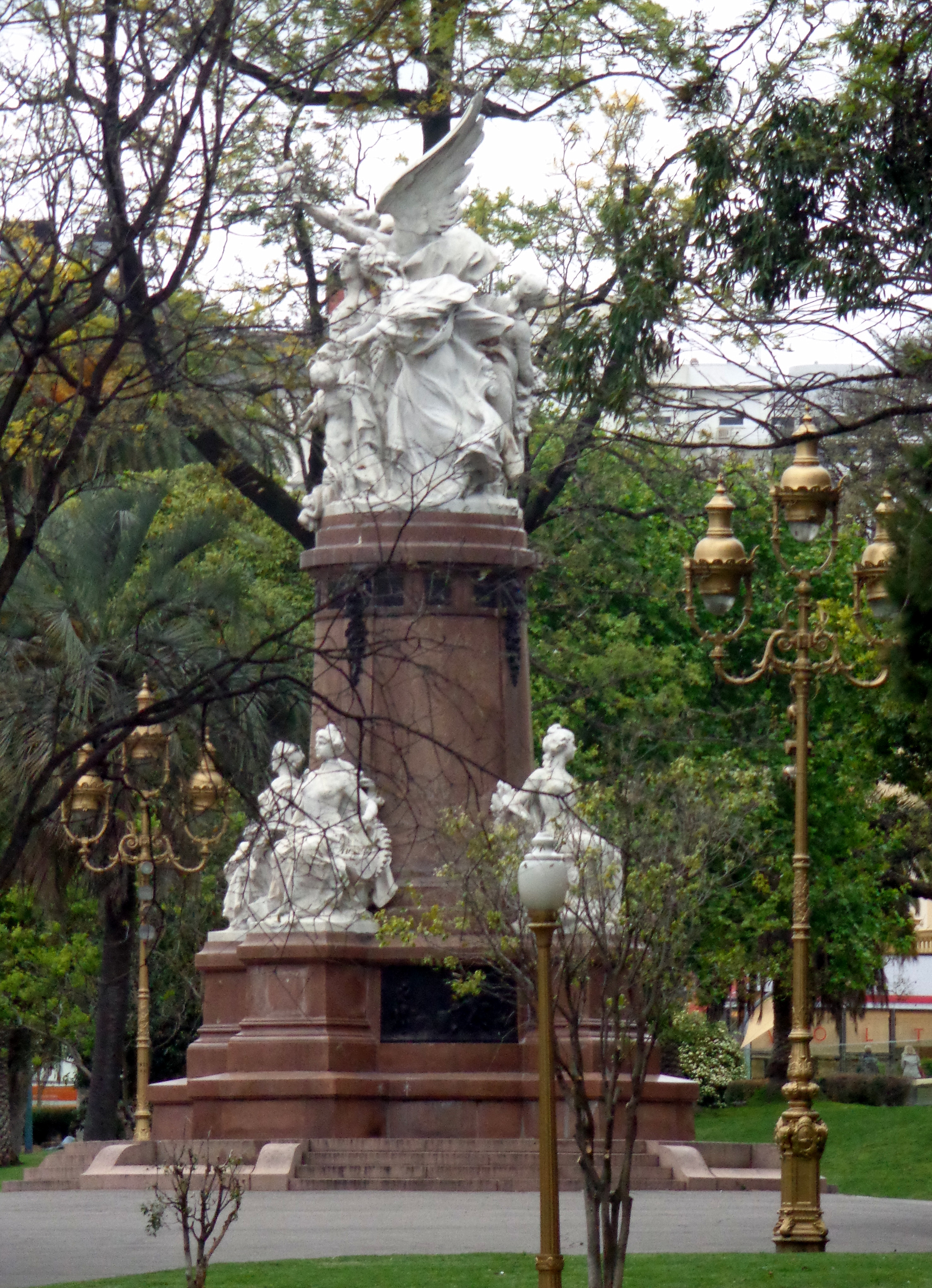
View of the Monument of France to Argentina, sculpted by Émile Peynot and gifted by the French community.

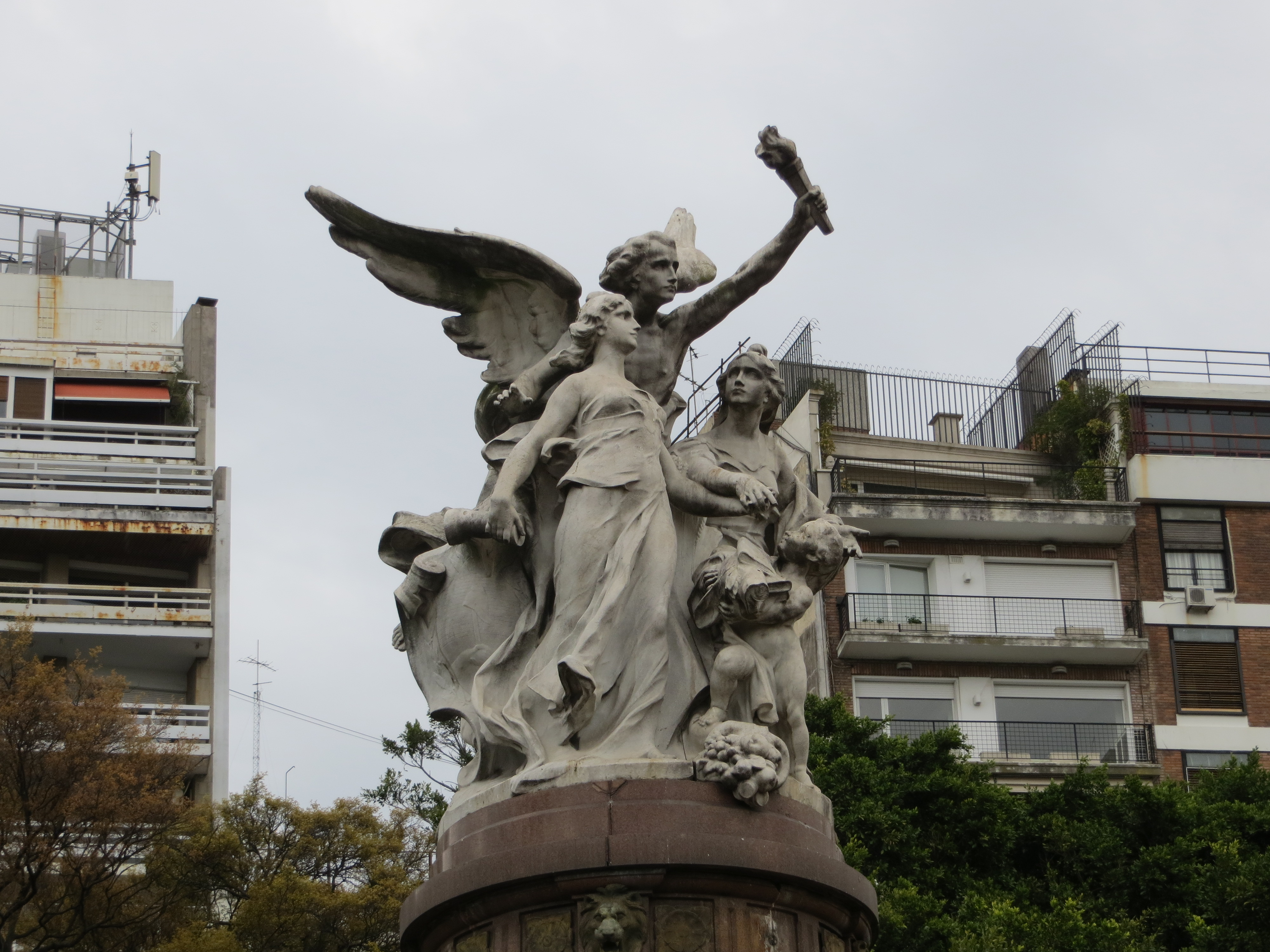
Detail of the Monument of France to Argentina, featuring national personifications of the two countries holding hands.

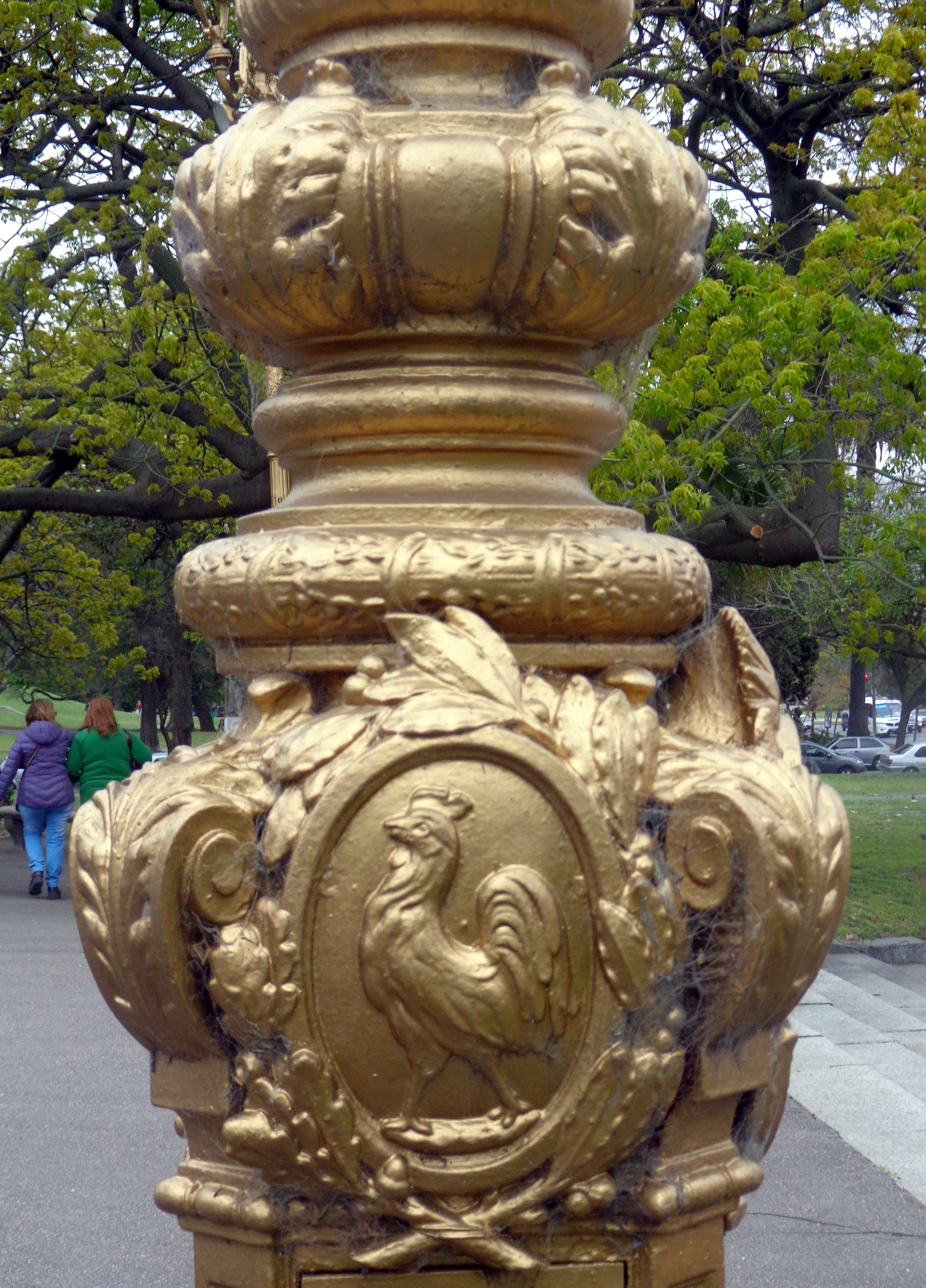
Detail of a lamppost in the square, featuring the Gallic rooster, national symbol of France.
