= Sonora Borinquen =

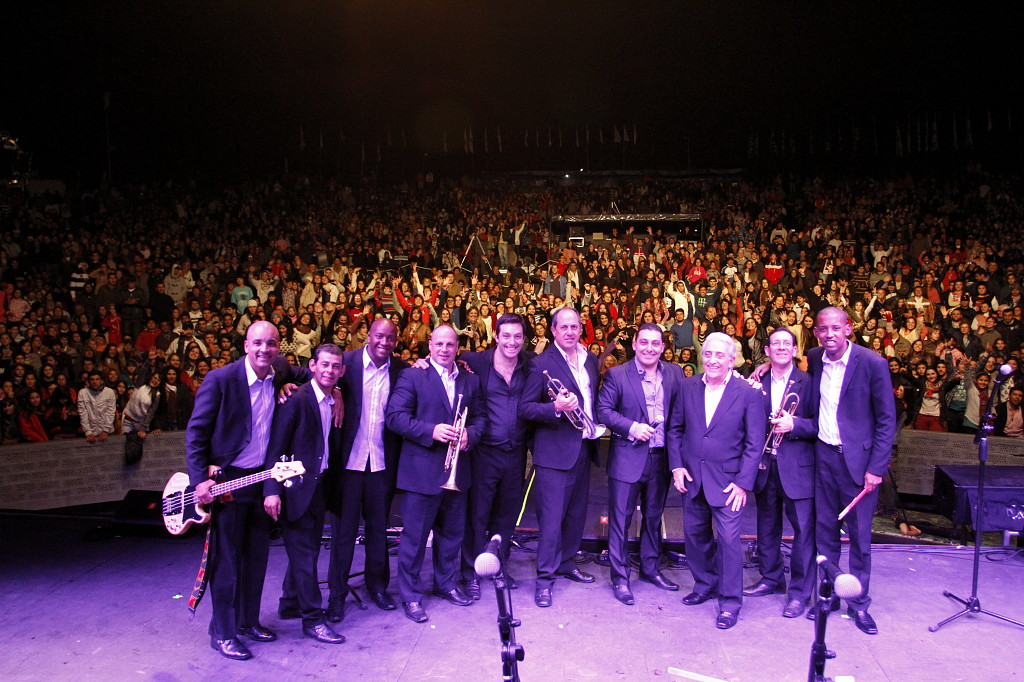
- Sonora Borinquen in 2014.

Background information
- Also known as: La Decana
- Origin: Montevideo, Uruguay
- Genres: plena, tropical, cumbia
- Years active: 1964–present
- Labels: Sondor, Macondo, Orfeo, Rainbow, Top Record, Límites, Latin Zone
- Members: Juan Carlos Goberna; Gonzalo Magariños; Andrés Angelelli; Daniel Romero; Gabriel Santos; Héctor Serafín; Wilson Rodríguez; Eduardo Maidana; Pablo Goberna; Carlos Goberna
- Past members: Oscar Leis, Roberto Boston, Esteban Osano, Pablo Silva, Sebastián Natal, Pedro Freire, Richard Madruga, Dardo Martínez, Héctor Regalini, Julio Rodríguez, Walter Soba, Rodolfo Morandi, Jorge Barreiro, José Misa, Eliceo Giménez, Carlos Pomposi, Luis Dornell, José Goberna, Martin Balestie, Ernesto Caboclo González,
- Website: Sonora Borinquen /SonoraBorinquen

Sonora Borinquen is a Uruguayan tropical music group. It was founded on 28 February 1964.

The orchestra was founded in Montevideo with influences of Caribbean music and tropical sounds, playing music for dances.

There are ten members: three singers, three trumpets, bass guitar, keyboard, timbales, and congas. They have released more than 50 albums, some shared with other bands and recorded in various media formats such as LPs, cassettes, CDs, and video. Nine of their albums were awarded gold discs in Uruguay.

On 30 October 2012, the leader of the band, the musician, composer, and singer Juan Carlos Goberna, was recognized as an "Illustrious Citizen of the City of Montevideo".

In 2013, they celebrated their fiftieth anniversary in music with a free concert at the Teatro de Verano Ramón Collazo.

Sonora Borinquen has toured the Americas, including Brazil, Argentina, Canada, and the US.

== Discography ==
- 1964 Así es Borinquen
- 1973 Tiembla el firmamento
- 1971 Tuya
- 1974 Diez años
- 1979 Aniversario
- 1979 El duelo
- 1968 Con toda el alma
- 1969 Así es Borinquen
- 1981 Mírame
- 1981 Continuados de boleros
- 1982 Los más grandes éxitos
- 1984 Camionero
- 1984 Aniversario
- 1985 Camionero
- 1988 Original
- 1988 Dios los cría
- 1989 Bodas de plata
- 1989 La noche
- 1989 El camionero de oro
- 1987 Identidad
- 1987 Cometa blanca
- 1990 Ellos se juntan
- 1991 Chévere
- Carlos 1° rey de ensalada
- Una fiesta en el batey
- Una fiesta en el batey
- Goberna mix 1
- El desafio
- Ellos se juntan
- Dios los cría
- Amor sagrado
- Cometa Blanca
- Ellos se juntan
- Sin tabú
- Bodas de plata
- El bonchon
- Así es borinquen
- Con toda el alma
- Sonora Borinquen
- 2002 Borinquen en Nueva York
- 2011 Los campeones de la salsa
- 2017 Trayectoria
Members
- Juan Carlos Goberna (vocals)
- Gonzalo Magariños
- Andrés Angelelli
- Daniel Romero
- Gabriel Santos
- Héctor Serafín
- Wilson Rodríguez
- Eduardo Maidana
- Pablo Goberna (vocals)
- Carlos "Junior" Goberna, hijo. (vocals)

Past members

- Oscar Leis
- Roberto Boston
- Esteban Osano
- Pablo Silva
- Sebastián Natal
- Pedro Freire
- Richard Madruga
- Dardo Martínez
- Héctor Regalini
- Julio Rodríguez
- Walter Soba
- Rodolfo Morandi
- Jorge Barreiro
- José Misa
- Eliceo Giménez
- Carlos Pomposi
- Luis Dornell
- José Goberna
