= Los Gatos (band) =

Argentine rock band

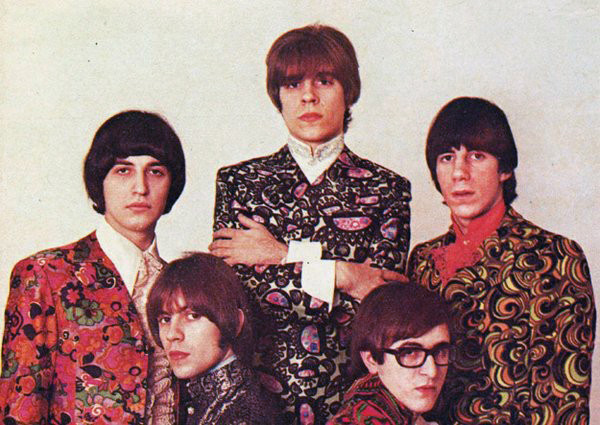
- Los Gatos in 1968; Top, from L–R: Ciro Fogliatta, Litto Nebbia, and Oscar Moro Bottom: Alfredo Toth and Kay Galifi

Background information
- Origin: Rosario, Argentina
- Genres: Pop rock; psychedelic rock; blues rock; garage rock
- Years active: 1967–1970 (reunion in 2007)
- Labels: RCA Victor; BMG
- Members: Litto Nebbia (1967–70); Kay Galiffi (1967–68); Ciro Fogliatta (1967–70); Alfredo Toth (1967–70); Oscar Moro (1967–70); Pappo (1969–70)

Los Gatos (Spanish for "the Cats") were an Argentine rock group from the late 1960s. The group was formed by Litto Nebbia and Alfredo Toth when their first group, Los Gatos Salvajes, disbanded. They are considered part of the founding trinity of Spanish-language rock in Argentina, along with Almendra and Manal. The unexpected success of their 1967 debut single "La balsa" was the kickstarter of Argentine rock, and pioneered Spanish-language rock. They explored psychedelic rock and their later recordings with Pappo are an early example of progressive rock. Los Gatos disbanded in 1970, and reunited for a tour in 2007.

== History ==
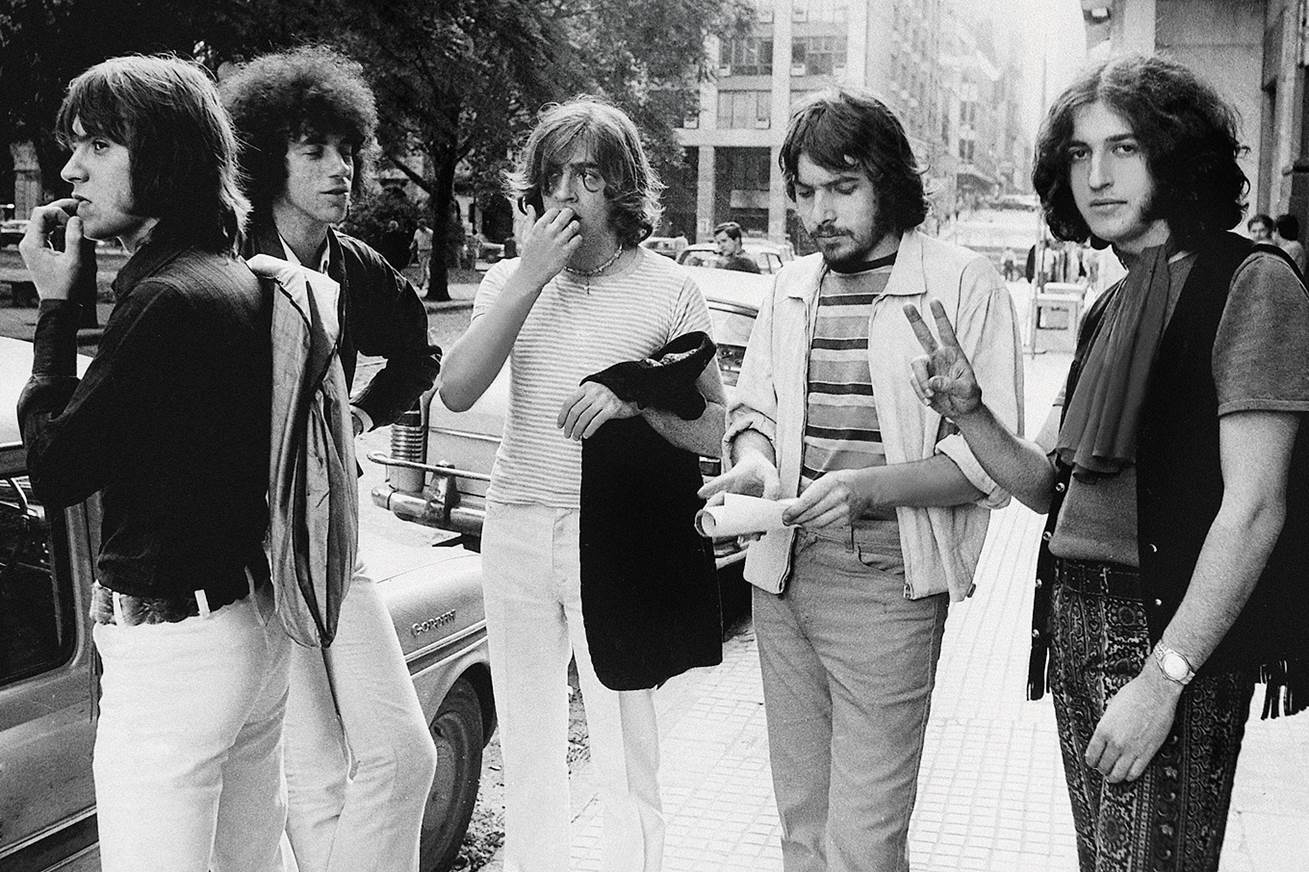
Final lineup of Los Gatos in 1970. From left: Toth, Moro, Nebbia, Pappo and Fogliatta.

The group was started in the wake of an earlier band Los Gatos Salvajes, in 1967. The groups shared two the same members, Nebbia and Toth. They recorded their debut single "La balsa" / "Ayer nomás" in June 1967. The song had been composed in the bathroom of La Perla del Once, a twenty-four-hour cafe frequented by university students, workers, and Argentine rock bands. The band had previously been removed from the restaurant on a few occasions for playing loud music and spending little money, and they were in the bathroom to avoid being kicked out again. Tanguito helped them write the song.

Released on July 3 1967, La balsa became an unexpected hit, selling over 200,000 copies and leading to their full-length debut later that year. The song's lyrics, which portrayed 1960s Argentina as lonely and repressive, helped to inspire a protest movement that called themselves náufragos: castaways. They engaged in "performative idleness," such as public dance parties and napping in the park, to protest the government's emphasis on productivity.

The following year they went on tour around the Southern Cone, and then released their 3rd album Seremos amigos (1968), permeating psychedelic rock during its height.

The band's next effort after a short hiatus, Beat N°1 (1969), featured the addition to the group of Pappo. His rocking blues style with Litto Nebbia's more classical melodic approach at times made the album uneven, but also created quite dazzling passages of music that can be considered one of the earliest recordings of progressive rock, previewing the rise of the genre in the 1970s.

In 1970, Los Gatos released their final studio album. Originally called Rock de la mujer podrida (literally "Rotten woman's rock"), the band was forced to change the name of the release by government censorship to Rock de la mujer perdida ("Lost woman's rock"). A harder rocking album with Pappo's fingerprints all over, it would be Los Gatos's last. Later that year Pappo left the band to form his own heavy blues-rock group Pappo's Blues. Los Gatos disbanded after a last batch of concerts, with Nebbia kicking off his solo career.

They later embarked on a reunion tour in 2007, releasing a live album from it.

== Discography ==
=== Studio albums ===
- Los Gatos (1967)
- Los Gatos (1968)
- Seremos amigos (1968)
- Beat N°1 (1969)
- Rock de la mujer perdida (1970)

=== Live albums ===
- Inédito: ¡En vivo! (1987)
- Reunión 2007 en vivo (2007)

=== Singles ===
- "La balsa" / "Ayer nomás" (1967)
- "Ya no quiero soñar" / "El rey lloró" (1967)
- "El vagabundo" / "Ayer nomás" (1968)
- "La mujer sin nombre" / "Las vacaciones" (1968)
- "No hay tiempo que perder" / "Un día de fiesta" (1968)
- "Seremos amigos" / "La chica del paraguas" (1968)
- "Viento, dile a la lluvia" / "Déjame buscar felicidad" (1968)
- "Sueña y corre" / "Soy de cualquier lugar" (1969)
- "Rock de la mujer perdida" / "Escapando de mí" (1970)
- "Mamá rock" / "Campo para tres" (1971)

== See also ==
- Argentine rock
