= Litto Nebbia =

Argentine singer-songwriter, musician and producer

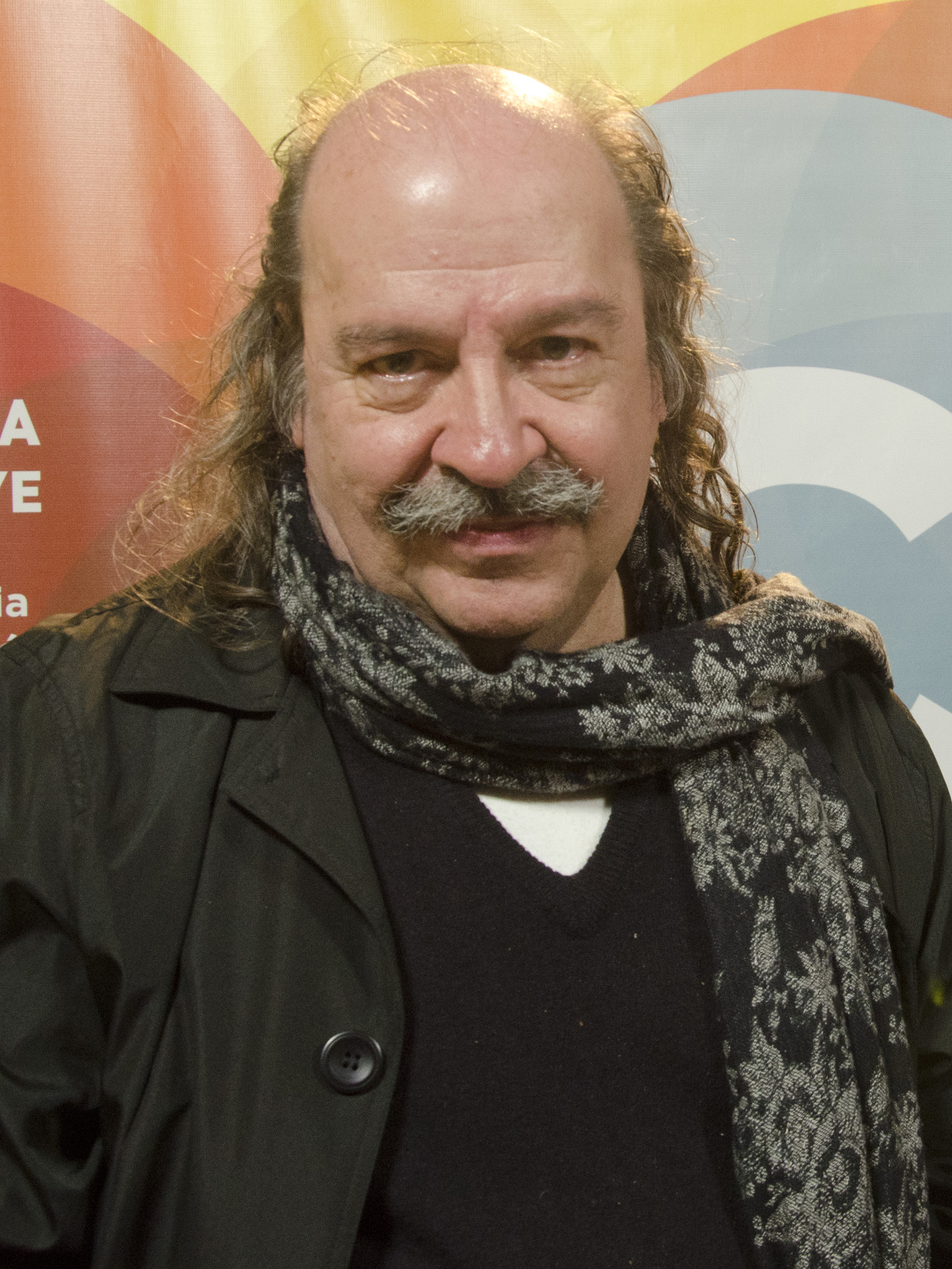
- Nebbia in 2014

Background information
- Born: Félix Francisco Nebbia Corbacho; 21 July 1948 (age 78); Rosario, Santa Fe, Argentina
- Genres: Rock, folk, tango rock, jazz rock, progressive rock, soundtracks
- Instruments: Vocals, guitar, piano, harmonica, keyboards
- Years active: 1960s–Present

Félix Francisco Nebbia Corbacho, better known as Litto Nebbia (born 21 July 1948) is an Argentine singer-songwriter, musician and producer, prominent in the development of the early Argentine rock scene.

== Life and work ==
Litto Nebbia was born in 1948 in Rosario, Santa Fe to Martha Corbacho and Félix Nebbia, two musicians. During his early teens, Litto left high school to join a friend, keyboardist Ciro Fogliatta, in a band: "The Wild Cats". The duo moved to Buenos Aires in 1963, and lived hand-to-mouth in a Balvanera ward tenement. They appeared in a television show, Escala Musical, a number of times, and became regulars at a popular neighborhood club, La Cueva, one of the cradles of Argentine rock.

Nebbia and Fogliatta formed "Los Gatos" in 1966. The group became known for their all-night performances, and composed most of their own songs, many in the well-known neighborhood café, "La Perla del Once" (facing Plaza Miserere). One such composition, La balsa (The Raft), was written at that location by Nebbia and the ill-fated songwriter Tanguito on 2 May 1967, and following its release on the RCA Victor label on 3 July, sold over 250,000 copies.

The album, which also included Moris Birabent's Ayer nomás (Just Yesterday) was the first local rock production to outsell either American or British rock titles locally, and the milestone became known as the birth of Argentine rock. The Argentine edition of Rolling Stone Magazine, in a 2007 retrospective, named the melancholy La balsa number one in the list of the 100 best albums in Argentine rock. Commercially, the album rescued the struggling group. Invited to perform the hit on television following its release, the group could only see themselves when the show aired at the kindness of an appliance store owner, who tuned a window display set to the program at their request.

Controversy ensued shortly after the hit's release however. A contentious debate soon arose as to whether Nebbia or Tanguito had contributed more to the composition (particularly after the latter's tragic, 1972 death). La balsa also aggravated officials in General Juan Carlos Onganía's conservative dictatorship, who stopped short of banning a song they believed encouraged escapism and drug abuse, but retaliated by shuttering La Cueva, whose stage had become the focal point for local rock groups (including Los Gatos). The band itself began losing cohesion, as well: guitarist Kay Galiffi relocated to Brazil, and Nebbia left the group in 1969; by 1970, Los Gatos had dissolved.

Nebbia began a solo career with RCA Records, and his first album, Litto Nebbia, benefited from having a number of its tracks included in local filmmaker Julio Porter's El extraño de pelo largo (The Long Haired Stranger). His work drew from the folklorical Chacarera genre in 1971 and 1972, and in 1973, he founded the Litto Nebbia Trio, whose repertoire centered on jazz. Nebbia produced folk rock duo Pastoral's En el hospicio (In the Hospice) in 1975, enjoying success in his first foray into record production.

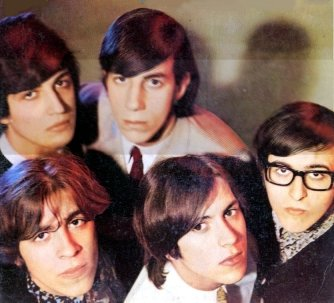
Los Gatos in 1967. Top row: Ciro Fogliatta (organ), Oscar Moro (drums); bottom row: Litto Nebbia (vocals, harmonica and tambourine), Alfredo Toth (bass), and Kay Galiffi (guitar).

The advent of a new dictatorship in 1976, and his subsequent intimidation and detainment, forced Nebbia to seek exile in Mexico, however. He remained creatively productive in exile, and released some of his most successful albums during this era, including Canciones para cada uno (Songs for Each of You) in 1978, and Sólo se trata de vivir (It's Only About Living), in 1981. Expecting a daughter, Miranda, and heartened by an improving civil liberties climate, Nebbia returned to Argentina in 1982.

His return was followed by the Rosariazo, a May 1983 concert in which he was joined by chanteuse Silvina Garré, Juan Carlos Baglietto, and Fito Páez, among others; his 1986 release, Demasiadas maneras de no saber nada (Too Many Ways to Know Nothing), was his fiftieth. Martha Nebbia, his mother, had recently converted a former Villa Urquiza shoe store into her new residence, and invited her son to install a recording booth there. Reunited with Salvador Barresi, the recording engineer from his days with Los Gatos, they improved and equipped the ad hoc space, which was opened as a recording studio in 1988, and which Barresi named El Nuevo Mundo ("The New World").

El Nuevo Mundo Studios led to Nebbia's 1989 establishment of Melopea Records, which he named after both the Ancient Greek music theory, and his own, 1974 album of that name. Melopea Records became known for discovering and promoting new talents, as well as producing unreleased tango compositions from decades earlier. Some of these latter included works by consular figures in the genre, such as Juan Carlos Cobián, Enrique Cadícamo, and Roberto Goyeneche. Nebbia was named Illustrious Citizen of Buenos Aires in 2002.

Los Gatos, save for drummer Oscar Moro (who had died a year earlier), were reunited for a revival in 2007. Nebbia presented a nine disc anthology of Argentine rock in 2010, and hosted a gathering of fellow Argentine rock greats on 9 July Avenue as part of official celebrations of the Argentina Bicentennial. Two of the most influential in the genre, Charly García and Luis Alberto Spinetta, acknowledged Nebbia and Los Gatos as inspirations for their own beginnings.

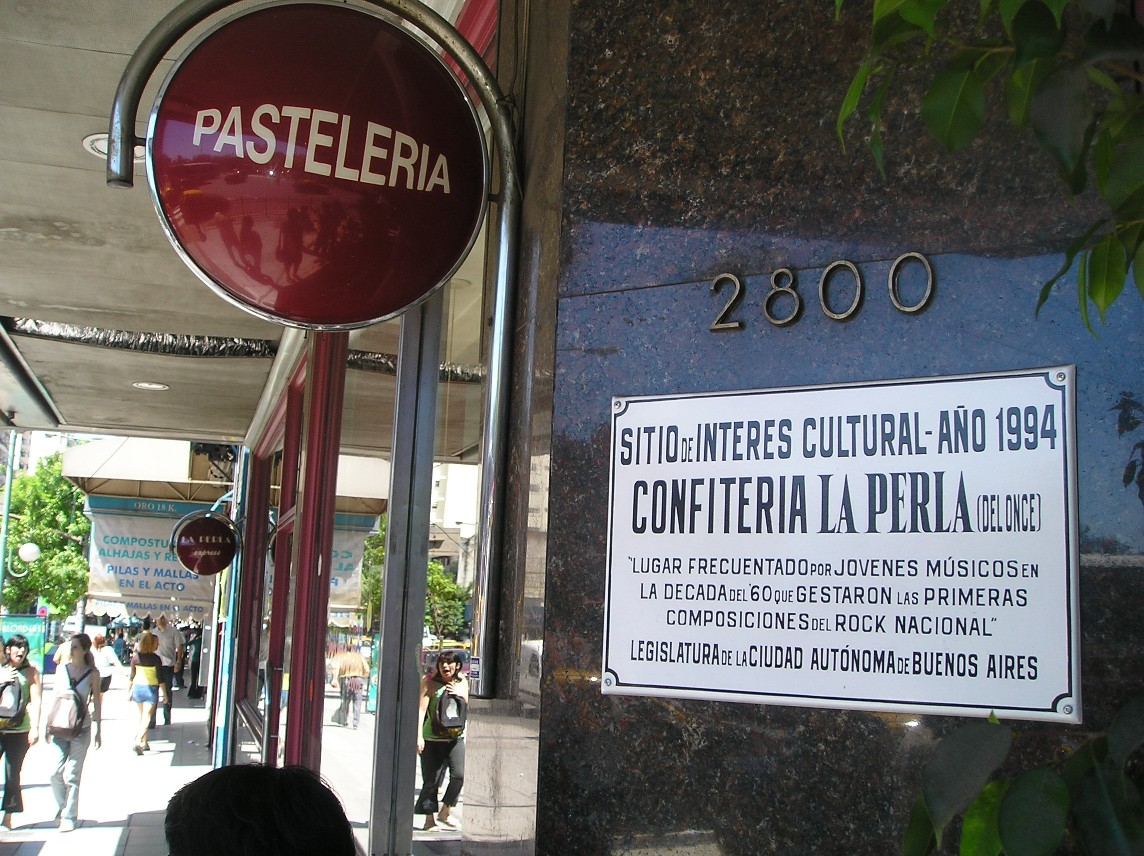
A municipal plaque commemorates the importance of the La Perla del Once café in the development of Argentine rock

== Discography (Studio) ==
- Litto Nebbia, 1969
- Litto Nebbia, Vol. 2, 1970
- Nebbia's Band, 1971
- Huinca (as Huinca), 1972
- Despertemos en América, 1973
- Muerte en la Catedral, 1973
- Melopea, 1974
- Fuera del Cielo, 1975
- Bazar de los Milagros, 1976
- Cosas que No Quieren Morir, 1976
- El Vendedor de Promesas. 1977
- Canciones para Cada Uno, Vol. 1, 1978
- Toda Canción Será Plegaria, with Mirtha Defilpo, 1979
- Creer, 1980
- Canciones para Cada Uno, Vol. 2, 1981
- 1981, 1981
- Solopiano, Vol. 1, 1981
- Solo Se Trata de Vivir. 1982
- Llegamos de los Barcos, 1982
- Evita: Quien Quiera Oír que Oiga (Soundtrack), 1983
- 1992, 1984
- Para que Se Encuentren los Hombres, with Cuarteto Zupay, 1984
- En Brasil, Aquí y Ahora... , 1985
- Luna Caliente (Soundtrack), 1985
- O Segredo da Vida, 1985
- Demasiadas Maneras de No Saber Nada, 1986
- The Naked Word (Recorded in 1979), 1987
- Musiqueros, (Nebbia-Baraj-González), 1987
- Buscando en el Bolsillo del Alma, 1988
- El Jardín de la Esquina, 1988
- Las Tres Corazonadas (Nebbia-Baraj-Borda), 1989
- Homenaje a Gardel y Le Pera, 1990
- Los Aviadores (Soundtrack), 1990
- Nostalgias del Harlem Español & la Luna Centinela, 1990
- Las Aventuras de Rubén Rada & Litto Nebbia, with Rubén Rada, 1990
- Esperando un Milagro, 1992
- Argentina de América, 1992
- Seguro, 1992
- Las Boludas (Soundtrack), 1993
- Ponto de Encontro (Zé Renato, Litto Nebbia & Victor Biglione), 1994
- New York Es una Ciudad Solitaria, 1994
- Bolero Afrolatino, with Cacho Tejera, 1994
- Nebbia Canta Cadícamo, 1995
- Páginas de Vida, Vol. 1-4, 1994
- Pequeño Manual de Vos y Yo, 1996
- Tangos Argentinos de Enrique Cadícamo, 1996
- Malvinas (Soundtrack), 1997
- El Hombre que Amaba a Todas las Mujeres, 1997
- Matar al Abuelito (Soundtrack), 1998
- Romancero Gitano de Federico García Lorca, 1998
- Beatles Songbook: A Southamerican Vision, Vol. 1 & 2, 1999
- Siempre Bailan Dos, 2000
- Beatles Songbook: A Southamerican Vision, Vol. 3, 2001
- Corazones y Sociedades, 2001
- Las Canciones que Escribí en México (Y las que Aprendí...), 2001
- Celebración, 2001
- Brian Wilson: Tributo, 2002
- Canciones Desde Península Valdés, with Alfredo Lichter, 2002
- La Noche del Colibrí, 2002
- La Melancolía Vital, with Lito Vitale, 2003
- Las Aventuras de Domingo Cura & Litto Nebbia, with Domingo Cura, 2003
- Tango & Nocturno, 2004
- Una Mirada, 2004
- Danza del Corazon, with La Luz, 2007
- The Blues, 2007
- The Blues-Parte 2, 2007
- Bella Madrid, 2008
- Soñando barcos..., 2009
- La Virtud del Día, with Hugo Diz, 2009
- Abandoneado, 2010
- A su Aire, 2010
- La Canción del Mundo, 2011
- 11 (Vidas), with Alfredo Lichter, 2011
- Aire Fresco (Nebbia-Homer-Ingaramo), 2012
- En Medio de los Hombres, with Facundo Cabral, 2012
- Colegio Horizontes - Vamos a Escribir una Canción, 2013
- Film Music Songbook, 2014
- Aire Fresco 2014, 2014
- Canto de la Luna, 2016
- Archivo Jobim, with Silvina Garré, 2016
- Rodar (50 Años de Rock Argentino), with Pez, 2017
- Amigos del Litoral, with Los Núñez & Cacho Bernal, 2017
- Canciones de Tucumán a Rosario, with Leopoldo Deza, 2018
- Alma, 2018
- Siempre en Sábado, 2020
- Cuadernos del Cine Francés de los 60, 2021
- Nunca Encontraré una Casa Como la que Hay en Mí, 2021
- Cuadernos de Apuntes Sonoros, 2022
- La Suite Rosarina, with Adrián Abonizio, 2022
- Temporada 75 Parte I: Silbando en el amanecer, 2023
- Temporada 75 Parte II: Serenidad, 2024
