= Los Beatniks =

Argentine rock band

- Origin: Villa Gesell, Buenos Aires
- Genre: Garage rock
- Years active: 1966–1967
- Label: Columbia Records
- Past members: Moris; Pajarito Zaguri; Javier Martínez; Jorge Navarro; Antonio Pérez Estévez

Los Beatniks were an early Argentine rock garage group. Active in 1966 and 1967, they went down in trivia history as recording the first original rock single in Argentina titled "Rebelde". Despite their short career, the band are considered one of the pioneers of Argentine rock.

== History ==
The band featured three key figures of the early rock movement in Argentina: Moris and Pajarito Zaguri on guitars and voice, Javier Martínez on drums. They were also the most important band playing at the La Cueva club in Buenos Aires, one of the mythical gathering spots from which many of the first Argentine rock bands would emerge.

Due to the limited commercial success of their first (and only) single, Los Beatniks separated in 1967.

Moris began his solo career in 1968, Javier Martinez formed with Manal in 1968, with Alejandro Medina on bass guitar and Claudio Gabis on guitar. Pajarito Zaguri formed La Barra de Chocolate since 1968 to early 1971.

== Discography ==
Singles

- "Rebelde" / "No finjas más" (1966)

Compilations

- Leyendas del Rock Vol. 5 (2007)
