= Moris (singer) =

Argentine rock musician (born 1942)

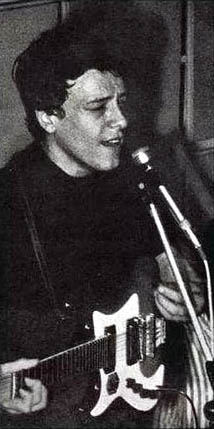
- Moris in 1970

Background information
- Born: Mauricio Birabent; 19 November 1942 (age 83); Buenos Aires, Argentina
- Genres: Rock and roll, folk rock, tango, rock
- Instruments: Vocals, guitar, piano, harmonica
- Years active: 1960–Present
- Formerly of: Los Beatniks

Mauricio "Moris" Birabent (born 19 November 1942) is an Argentine rock musician and pioneer of Spanish-language rock. In the 1960s, he was the frontman for Los Beatniks.

== Biography ==
Birabent was born on 19 November 1942, in Buenos Aires. He took guitar lessons at age 12 and, in subsequent years, began frequenting local piano bars and jazz clubs. The son of an engineer, he enrolled at the Otto Krause Technical School. He maintained his musical interests, however, and, in 1965, began performing at La Cueva, a Balvanera-neighborhood disco. Birabent relocated to seaside Villa Gesell in early 1966 and opened the Juan Sebastián Bar, where he formed Los Beatniks.

Los Beatniks obtained a CBS recording contract for their single, "Rebelde", within months of their formation. The release of the single coincided, however, with the overthrow of the moderate President Arturo Umberto Illia and his replacement with the repressive General Juan Carlos Onganía, who, upon learning that the album's insert contained shirtless photos of the band, had the release immediately banned, and the group soon disbanded.

Birabent continued composing and performing, and though he struggled, his single, Ayer nomás (Only Yesterday) was made into a local hit by Los Gatos. With his wife, Inés, and two children to look after, however, Birabent signed on as a soloist with Mandioca Records in 1969, and the following year, released 30 minutos de vida (30 Minutes in the Life). His second album, Ciudad de guitarras callejeras (City of Street Guitars, 1973) was a departure from his earlier, folk rock style, and drew more from the Argentine tango.

The worsening political and economic climate in Argentina led Birabent to leave for Spain in 1977. There, he recorded Fiebre de Vivir (A Fever for Living), whose 1979 release included his version of Carl Perkins' rockabilly standard, Blue Suede Shoes, and his hit single, Sábado a la noche (Saturday Night). Its success prompted him to return for an April 1980 concert at Buenos Aires' Obras Stadium.

Birabent returned to Argentina for debut concerts for each of his subsequent albums, though his popularity gradually declined. He was joined in the band by his son, Antonio Birabent, in 1989 (the younger Birabent later entered acting, and became well known for his lead role as the villain in the thriller series, Epitafios). His 1995 release, Sur y después (South, and then), was notable for its being recorded in Buenos Aires and performed in the Cervantes Theatre with the Argentine National Symphony Orchestra.

== Discography ==
- 30 Minutos de Vida (1970)
- Ciudad de Guitarras Callejeras (1973)
- Fiebre de Vivir' (1979)
- Mundo Moderno(1980)
- Las Obras de Moris(1981)
- ¿Dónde están las Canciones? (1982)
- Señor Rock, Presente (1985)
- Moris y Amigos (1987)
- Sur y Después' (1995)
- Cintas Secretas (2005)
- Familia Canción (2011) - Recorded with Antonio Birabent.
