= Argentine rock =

Rock music composed by Argentine bands

Argentine rock (known locally as rock nacional [ˈroɣ nasjoˈnal], 'national rock' in the sense of 'local, not international') is rock music composed or performed by Argentine bands or artists mostly in Spanish.

Argentine rock was the earliest incarnation of Spanish-language rock. It began by recycling hits of English-language rock & roll. A rising trend of composing new songs mostly in Spanish can be traced at least back to the late 1960s, when several garage groups and aspiring musicians began composing songs and lyrics that related to local social and musical topics. Since then, Argentine rock started and continued through uninterrupted evolution through the 1970s and into the 1980s.

A distinguishing trait of Argentine rock is its insistence on Spanish language lyrics. Argentine rock today is a blanket term describing a number of rock styles and sub-cultures within Argentina.

== Origins in the mid-1950s ==
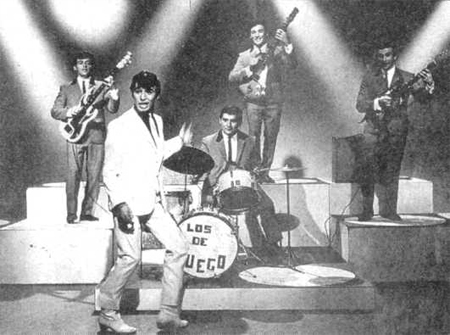
Sandro y Los del Fuego in 1961

Rock and roll first began to appear in Argentina in 1955 after the genre was created in the United States in 1954–1955, based largely on rhythm and blues and country and western.

On December 5, 1955, the first recorded rock song in Argentina was made. It was a version of "Rock Around the Clock" performed by trumpeter Roger Santander's jazz orchestra.

Singer and trombonist Eddie Pequenino, a native of jazz (in the 1940s, while still a teenager, he formed the band Jazz Los Colegiales with Ricardo Romero) and R&B (in the early 1950s, he had formed Eddie Parker and his Rhythm Band), was the first, in 1956, to sing rock and roll with Lalo Schiffrin's orchestra. The Columbia record label approached him about launching a solo career, but he preferred to hide his identity, forming the first rock band in Argentina to release albums: Mr. Roll y sus Rocks, with Arturo Schneider on tenor saxophone, Jaime Rodríguez Anido (aka Ike) on lead electric guitar, Héctor Rea on rhythm guitar, Domingo Malagreca on double bass, and Jorge Padín on drums. Their first recording was released on December 7, 1956, in January 1957, selling more than 27,000 copies.

The band recorded several covers of Bill Haley and other rockers such as Bobby Freeman and Alan Dale, including "See You Later, Alligator," "Mambo Rock," "Rock," "Shake, Rattle and Roll," and "Rancho Rock," with Bill Haley & His Comets being their greatest influence with their swing-oriented style. At first, the musicians hid their identity so the public would think they were an American band. But Pequenino finally revealed his identity on a live program on Radio El Mundo, where the alleged immorality of rock dancing was being debated. Following this revelation, Mr. Roll and his Rocks were hired to play on that station every Wednesday night, and then moved to Radio Splendid on Fridays at 8:30 p.m. The group's success was such that their recordings of Bill Haley songs outsold the originals.

That same year, Eddie Pequenino was the star of the first original Argentine rock song sung in Spanish, the aforementioned "Rock con leche," a humorous song created in collaboration with Argentine comedian Délfor Dicásolo, Radio El Mundo's musical arranger Santos Lipesker, comedy scriptwriter Aldo Cammarota, and music producer Ben Molar. Thanks to the success of the song, the film Venga a bailar el rock was shot, released on August 29, 1957, starring Mr. Roll y sus Rockers and actors Eber Lobato, Nélida Lobato, Alfredo Barbieri, Alberto Anchart Jr., and Pedrito Rico. The film included two of Pequenino's own English compositions ("Despacio nena" and "Aquí viene el rock"), and a Spanish rock song titled after the film, created by Éber Lobato. In May 1958, Bill Haley visited Argentina with his band, performing at the Metropolitan Theater, and chose Mr. Roll y sus Rockers as the opening act.

This was the genre's most successful moment in Argentina, and it reignited the controversy surrounding rock music, when certain media outlets argued that young people were "going crazy" in movie theaters because of rock movies, sometimes causing damage, and raised their guard against the arrival of Bill Haley, saying that rock and roll was a foreign music. Meanwhile, Antena magazine published an issue featuring Bill Haley wearing a poncho and drinking mate, as a gesture of cultural reconciliation.

The arrival of this new musical phenomenon and the formation of Mr. Roll y sus Rocks caught the attention of the Argentine record industry, which saw a segment of society that had previously been unexplored: teenagers and young adults. This would open up a new market for youth music bands and soloists.

In 1958, following the success of Bill Haley & His Comets' visit earlier that year, more rock and roll bands were formed, performing their own songs as well as compositions by groups from the United States. Several members of these musical groups included members who would later become popular pop singers of the so-called "new wave" in Argentina in the 1960s. Rock and roll radio programs also began to appear, such as those on Radio Libertad (now AM del Plata) and Radio El Mundo. Jazzlandia magazine had taken note of the explosion of rock and roll on the Argentine music scene and began publishing articles, lyrics, sheet music, and rock reviews, as well as publishing Estrellas magazine. Rodríguez Luque, the disc jockey for the program Música en el aire, created the Disc-Jockey label, which released emerging rock musicians. In April of that year, Loving You, the third film by Elvis Presley, was released, translated in the country under the title La mujer que yo adoro, It had a media promotion unlike the previous two releases, the result was a "boom" in Elvis's aesthetics.

The Paters was formed with singer Lalo Fransen (future member of El Club del Clan) who at the time called himself Danny Santos. Their two most popular singles were recordings of Marty Robbins's "A White Sport Coat (and a Pink Carnation)" and Elvis Presley's "I Forgot to Remember to Forget". Los Modern Rockers also appeared, and their member Luis Aguilé—who performed his own songs as Los Iracundos and covers of artists like Pat Boone—would also stand out years later, when he was signed to the Odeón label, and with his guitar and the support of Armando Patrono's orchestra, recorded the bolero "Mirá qué luna", but also one of the first rock songs originally created in Argentina, "La Balanza".

Accompanied by the Lucio Milena orchestra, the Spanish versions he recorded of Billy Cafaro, Paul Anka's "Pity, pity and "Personalidad" were a considerable success. It is said from that time that "when Billy would sing on Radio El Mundo, located at Maipú 555, the lines of fans would reach two blocks and clog up the center of the capital. On more than one occasion he would arrive there aboard a helicopter that landed on the obelisk and he would be guarded on the way to the radio station as dozens of young women would try to jump on him, just as they did when he performed in a theater or club." These hits were followed by several more, such as Marcianita, Bésame Pepita, and Viento, viento (these last two composed by Lucio Milena, at the request of Daniel Tinayre for the 1960 film "La Patota"), selling a million copies of their first long play, "Bésame Pepita". However, when he performed a Spanish-language rendition of the German hit "Kriminal Tango", it proved to be very unpopular among tango fans, who misinterpreted the song and considered it an offense to tango. Billy Cafaro suffered repeated attacks from tango fans, so he moved to Spain. A native of this country, Andy Maciá recorded his own songs in Spanish, such as "Rock del vaquero", "Tú eres mi luna" and "Una motoneta" —the latter being an advertising jingle for Siam-Lambretta scooters, and possibly the first advertising jingle in Argentine history— aided by Horacio Malvicino's orchestra, who at that time called himself Don Nobody. Later, when he turned to tango in Europe, he would adopt another pseudonym, Alain Debray.

In July 1961, the multinational record company RCA hired a musician under the pseudonym Balder, who had appeared on the program Justa del Saber on Channel 7. A 45 RPM single was released with a rock song composed by Balder himself, "El rock del tom tom", the first Argentine song that can be classified without a doubt within the genre rockabilly. Shortly after, his Spanish-language composition "Zapatos de pom pom" was also released. The artist was Alberto Felipe Soria, known as Johnny Tedesco. The album sold half a million copies in a very short time, also becoming a radio hit. Tedesco developed a style heavily influenced by Elvis Presley, a blend of rock, rockabilly, and country, and established himself as a Spanish-language performer of his own compositions and international rock hits. "Presumida," "Un monto de amor," "Preciso tu amor esta noche," "Ocho días a la semana," "Coqueta" (his own composition), and "La plaga" are some of his interpretations that helped consolidate the rock genre in Argentina.

In August 1961, the multinational CBS, to counteract and contrast the success and the figure of Tedesco, promoted and edited its new artist Tony Vilar, who with his own songs in Spanish like the rockabilly "Rock de Fuego" and "Bailando", or versions of the Dúo Dinámico like "Quince años tiene mi amor" or "Diablito" by Neil Sedaka. Tony represented the typical son of Italian immigrants of the youth of the moment. He was the first Argentine to interpret the so-called slow rock or slow ballads, and his most important piece in this genre was the slow rock in Spanish "Y los cielos lloraron" with Frank Ferrer and his group (pseudonym of Waldo de Los Ríos). Their second album was released in 1962, featuring the singles "Despeinada", "Nada vale sin amor", and "Acomplejada". While its success was short-lived, it was quickly overshadowed by the dizzying emergence of Club del Clan.

At that time, Los Pick Ups, Horacio Ascheri's band, had emerged, recording their own songs like "Mi promesa" and "Es La Locura". Radio Antártida, the name that Radio América had at that time, presented a rock and roll program all day long from beginning to end, which included in its schedule the programs A Window to Success with Antonio Barrios, La Discoteca de Juan José with Juan José May, La Whiskería de Johnny Carel and Círculo Musical with Héctor Larrea.

=== Late 60s beat music ===
The first few years of rock music in Argentina were confined to cover bands. In 1964, Argentina, like much of the rest of the world, was shaken by Beatlemania. Bands from that era are: The Seasons with Carlos Mellino and Alejandro Medina, Los Vip's group of Charly Leroy, Los In, band of Francis Smith and Amadeo Álvarez who performed some of their own songs, Sam & Dan (duo of the RCA that would enter with the new label "VIK La Nueva Generación"), Los Bestias (antecedent of Los Blue Men), Los Bishops and their continuation Los Jerks (famous for performing a cover of You Really Got Me, by The Kinks, with an initial formation that included Félix Pando and Hiacho Lezica, future members of La Joven Guardia, along with guitarist Richard Mochulske, who would later form Alta Tensión with Héctor Starc and Vitico Bereciartúa), The Snakes and its follow-up The Knacks (who recorded a single with two Beatles covers: "Yellow Submarine"/"Norwegian Wood") Telmo y Los Stones (closer to the classic sound of the fifties with an imitator of Elvis as a singer), Los Comanches, Billy Bond (spseudonym of the Italian Luciano Canterini, who performed accompanied by the Lew Quartet -of the guitarist Roberto Lew- or by the Gamba Trio -of the guitarist Juan "Gamba" Gentillini-), the Larkins (whose best known member currently would be Luis Alberto Spinetta) and many others.

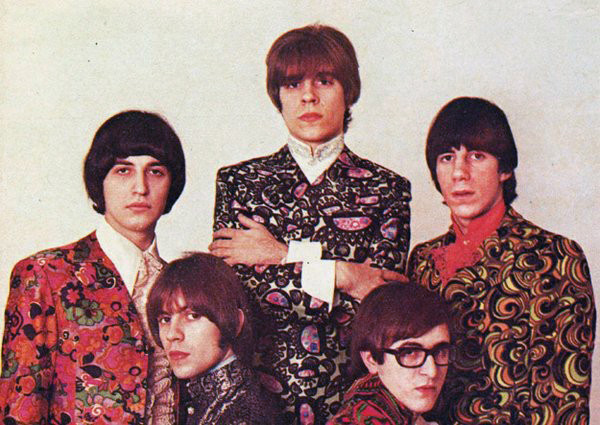
First formation of Los Gatos, circa 1968

By 1965, rock music was developing rapidly in Argentina. On television, several shows such as Ritmo y Juventud and El Club del Clan, with singers like Palito Ortega, Violeta Rivas, Chico Navarro, and Lalo Fransen, featured a poppy version of rock, which owed equal amounts to Merseybeat and to Argentine and Italian romantic pop.

On July 3, 1967, the single "La balsa" by the band Los Gatos was released, opening a new era in the history of Argentine rock. "La balsa" had been started in the early hours of May 2, 1967, by Tanguito (José Alberto Iglesias) in the men's restroom of the bar La Perla del Once, who passed it to Litto Nebbia to finish the song. Nebbia based his work on a harmonic sequence related to the great bossa nova hit "Garota de Ipanema" and with its recording by Los Gatos it became a phenomenon that swept away the entire scene as it was known until then. The single was a huge success that shocked everyone: it sold 250,000 copies..

The success of "La balsa" established a new model of songwriting in the Argentine rock scene: sung in Spanish instead of English, original compositions instead of covers, including Argentine elements such as their slang, and with themes related to counterculture ideologies. For the group of young people most influenced by the intellectual, bohemian, and counterculture environment, this new style contradicted the beat scene from which Los Gatos came. From that moment on, the desire to differentiate themselves from it led them to adopt inflexible positions with the aim of delimiting the supposedly antagonistic domains of "complacent music" and "progressive music," although the musical differences were not usually as clear and sharp as the new media proclaimed.

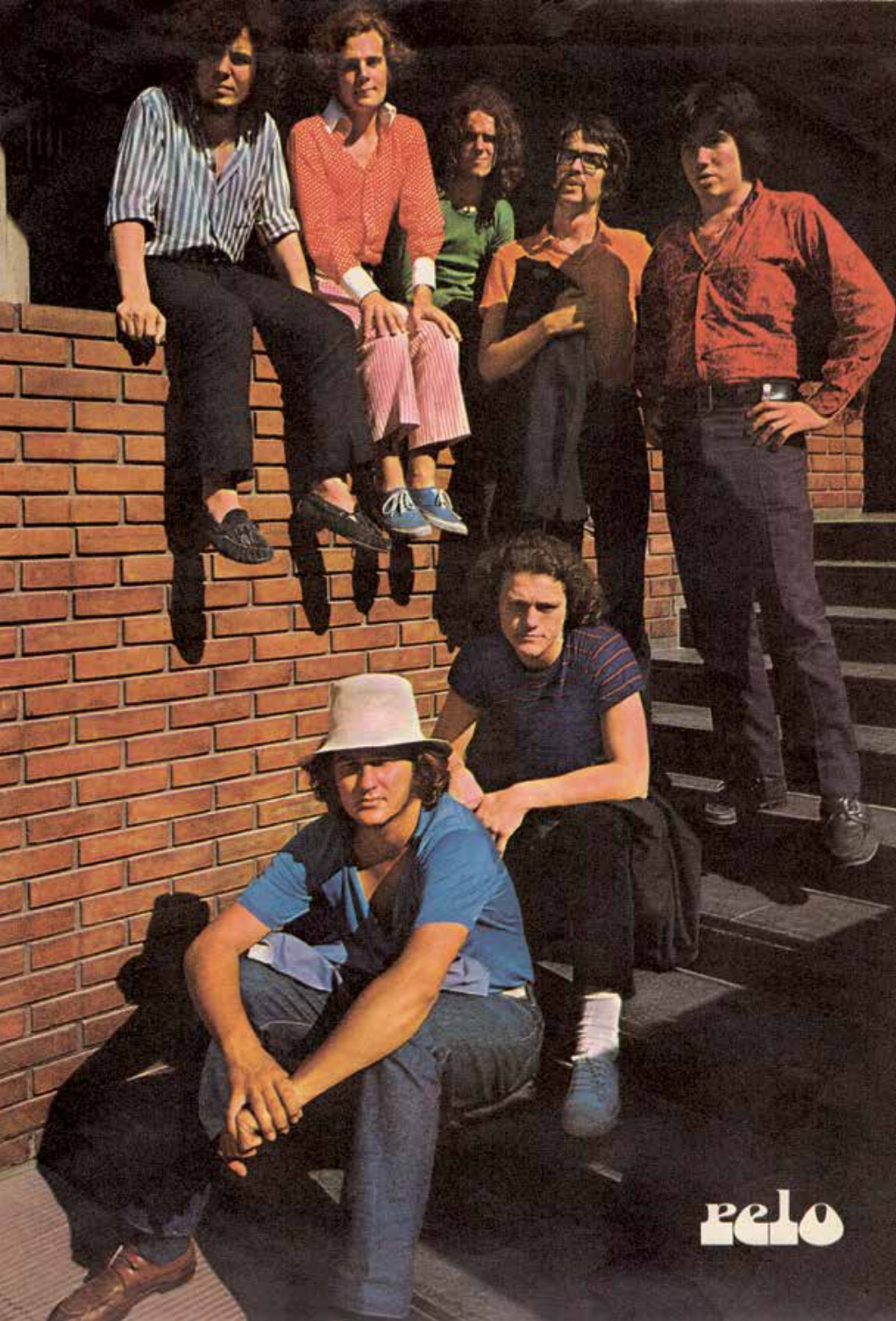
Almendra and Manal in a poster for Pelo magazine, circa 1970

Hippie followers and journalists began to disparagingly refer to the other wing of beat music, which featured songs without ideological commitments, as "complacent music." The greatest exponent of this movement at the time was Los Náufragos, who in 1968 managed to get the CBS label to record their first single, "La Leyenda de Xanadú", which included as its B-side the first song composed by Tanguito, the same co-author of "La Balsa", called "Sutimente a Susana". For the second single ("Eloise / Vuelvo a Naufragar"), the group incorporated Francis Smith as a producer and later a key figure, who would later become one of the greatest authors of poprock. However, the single in question is the antithesis of the "complacent" sound that the early rock press would later accuse it of. On the contrary, its sound, driven by the inimitable sound of the Hammond organ, was completely in tune with the psychedelic pop that was triumphing in Europe at the time. "Eloise", a song almost five minutes long, surpassed the directives imposed by the labels to facilitate its broadcasting and stood out for the exquisite vocals of Quique Villanueva and the orchestral sound that surrounded it. The B-side, "Vuelvo a Naufragar", presented the same sound with a catchier chorus, but the orchestral background also gave it a psychedelic touch, which would be enhanced in the surf version that Bingo Reyna recorded that same year on his last solo album: Mi corazón es una guitarra.

Los Náufragos's next hit was "Otra vez en la Vía" (FlatBroke Again); which was the title of their first LP in 1969. It included six songs composed by Pajarito Zaguri, another of La Cueva's regulars, and despite criticism, several of its lyrics - "Cómo viene la mano" (How the Hand Comes), "Hoy un plato volador" (Today a Flying Saucer) - dealt with the same themes as Los Gatos's and equally reflected the ideology of the young rock movement, while in "Hippies y todo el circo" (Hippies and the Whole Circus), they lamented the rivalry between the different "tribes" of young people from Buenos Aires. From that moment on, and with Francis Smith already established as their main composer, they would lose that psychedelic component to embrace a much more commercial dance pop, as in their hits "Zapatos Rotos" (Rotten Shoes) and "De Boliche en Boliche" (Bowling Jack's). With that imprint, Los Náufragos came to produce in the early seventies a saga of successes of unusual relevance throughout Ibero-America, to such an extent that in 1973 the magazine Cashbox mentioned Los Náufragos as the group that had sold the most singles in Spanish in the world in all of history

Another band that, for a time, seamlessly encompassed both beat and rock scenes, until it was scorned by critics, was Séptima Brigada, whose most renowned songs—"Paco Camorra" and "Juan Camelo"—displace (or obscure) the listening of others like "Señor Brujo," with its obvious influences from Santana's "Black Magic Woman," "Sureña y Solitaria," whose rich instrumentation allows it to be considered one of the first progressive rock exercises in Argentina, or "Mis penas sobre la quena," described as "Latinsoul" which features guitarist Jorge Montes, who years later would form Montes Mahatma.

Another of the great bands of the beat era that suffered the same fate was Formación 2000, who recorded English covers of the Anglo-Saxon rock hits of the moment, but at the same time composed songs in Spanish in a tone of psychedelic pop of the highest quality. The instrumentation was not only outstanding, but also ahead of its time with details never seen before in national rock, such as the double bass drum implemented since the late sixties by their drummer Juan Espósito. In their first single, in 1969, they showed this double face: on side A, Orgullosa Mary (cover of Proud Mary by Creedence Clearwater Revival) accompanied on side B by the beautiful Mañana será. That same year they released what would be their only long play, El Mundo al Revés, that included two covers of Creedence, Orgullosa Mary and Al salir la luna (their version of Bad Moon Rising) and one of the Rolling Stones hit, Susie Q. But the rest of the compositions were their own. The one that ended up giving the album its name is a country rock exercise with violin as the lead instrument and a clear Creedence influence. The song's lyrics, like The Long-Haired Stranger by La Joven Guardia, or Hippies and the Whole Circus by Los Náufagos, represented a protest against the prejudices to which young people with long hair were subjected. There were also notable moments of baroque psychedelia and British influences such as The Castle of the Sun King Unfortunately, despite the extraordinary quality of their own material, the mere inclusion of covers ended up marginalizing Formación 2000 from the "progressive" category in the press of the time. Vilified as "complacent," they ended up breaking up shortly after the album's release and were forgotten. In 1971, two of its members—drummer Juan "Locomotora" Espósito and keyboardist Luis Valenti—would join El Reloj, a pioneering band of progressive hard rock in Argentina.

In 1970, La Joven Guardia came to embody the rise of beat music with their hit "El extraño de pelo largo" (The Long-Haired Stranger), which led to a 1970 film being made under that name, with Litto Nebbia starring in it, dramatizing the arrival of Los Gatos Salvajes from Rosario to Buenos Aires. In the film, Los Gatos share the bill with beat bands like Trocha Angosta, La Joven Guardia, Conexión n.º 5, Pintura Fresca and also with the duo Pedro y Pablo, pioneers of protest folk rock, who at the time had just released their first single: "I live in this city / The paths that no one follows". The song that occupied the A side -and that would give name to the duo's first album-, portrayed the same central theme of the film "El Extraño de pelo largo", that is, the complications that the "modern" young people of Buenos Aires had to dress with the significant clothes of the pop fashion (from long hair for men to miniskirts for women). La Joven Guardia, for its part, continued the success of the single with a long play of the same name, which contained compositions and arrangements of enormous quality. They allowed themselves, like the Beatles in "Lucy in the Sky with Diamonds", to make a nod to the psychedelic movement by titling a song with an acronym for LSD ("Madmen, Saints, Devils"), and even closing the album on a conceptual level, narrating the death of the Stranger that gave it its title, "a victim of the cruelty of society", killed by the police, according to the interpretation made by the author himself. After these successes, La Joven Guardia even followed the path of some of the progressive musicians, opting for political radicalization. The singer Roque Narvaja and the bassist Enrique Masllorens had begun to join left-wing groups and their lyrics were beginning to move away from their initial candor to adopt a tone of social denunciation, such as "Fuerza para vivir"" and the incredibly explicit -for the time- "Los corderos engañados"". In this one, besides adding a distorted guitar and a drum solo, Narvaja sang: "The eagle from the North came to tend the bar / with sodas and movies about Vietnam / we are good, said the wolf without thinking twice / he tricked him and showed him the peace sign. / They will soon sleep with wine / and they will get fed up without reacting / the wolf is the boss of the place / with his friends he will devour them. / Wolves and lambs. / Wolves and lambs. / Wolves and lambs". This change of direction was not well received by the public, nor by the other members of the band, who were concerned about the decline in sales. All of this motivated Masllorens to leave to form Cuero, a more progressive and heavy band, with Nacho Smilari and Carlos Calabró. He was replaced by Víctor "Vitico" Bereciartua, with whom La Joven Guardia returned to the beat sources, obtaining a new hit with "La Reina de la canción" (1971). After the success of this single, the band's third and final album, with the same name, was released, in which they moved away from the beat sound to include samples of the style that Roque Narvaja would develop in his later stage as a soloist. Songs like "Tu Libertad", "Dicen Que Te Fuiste A La Montaña" or "Mi Pensamiento" approach the acoustic psychedelic song with an opening to Latin American folk and committed lyrics like those that, since 1972, would shape the solo career of Roque Narvaja after his departure from La Joven Guardia.

Trocha Angosta and Banana were two other notable bands of this movement that over time, in the early seventies, evolved towards ballads and what was later called soft rock or melodic rock in the world. This path had already been started by the Uruguayans Los Iracundos, who, although they came from an earlier era, were also considered part of the beat movement and had defined the bases of the melodic style with their 1968 classic Puerto Montt.

Kano y Los Bull Dogs were a band formed in Montevideo in 1964 but based in Buenos Aires since 1967. In 1969 they achieved success with the song Sobre un vidrio mojado, included in "Los favoritos a la luna", which would be the best-selling compilation in the history of RCA Argentina. Sobre un vidrio mojado was the most broadcast song on the longplay, achieving success throughout Latin America. IThe label immediately attempted to capitalize on this success by releasing their first self-titled album. The album began with "Vuelvo a casa," one of the best adaptations of the Californian psychedelic sound to the Río de la Plata region, and continued with the already established "Sobre un vidrio mojado," which opened the way for ten other songs, mostly ballads, with beautiful arrangements and great dreamlike atmospheres. However, as happened to other beat bands, their first hit ended up eclipsing the brilliant composition of other songs. Lyrics like "Hoy se rieron" —a true manifesto of the hippie lifestyle— were ignored, and the press ended up calling them "complacent" for having such a massive success. Unlike the bands from Buenos Aires, Kano and the Bulldogs was able to move away and continue his career in Montevideo, where in 1971 they released, before disbanding, a second album, Carita con carita, in which the ballads were complemented by Latin rhythms in a style closer to that popularized at that time by Santana (in Báilalo ya) and with passages similar to the heavy rock sound that was beginning to take hold in Buenos Aires (La quiero and Se vistió de negro).

Almendra was a discovery by Ricardo Kleiman, host of the radio program Modart en la noche, which was enormously influential among the youth of those years. It was he who offered them to record a single on RCA with Rodolfo Alchourron as artistic director, and even borrowed them, to obtain a better sound, the instruments of The Tremeloes, a band from the British Invasion that had shared the stage with the Beatles and the Rolling Stones, and that Kleinman had taken to Argentina at the time. The album was released in November and went on sale the following year, with "Tema de Pototo" as side A, and "El mundo entre las manos", as side B. Almendra's first album is often considered one of the best in the history of Argentine rock. The album is made up of nine tracks, all of them standouts from the Argentine songbook. Seven of them are by Spinetta: "Muchacha (ojos de papel)", "Figuración", "Ana no duerme", "Fermín", "Plegaria para un niño dormido", "A estos hombres tristes" and "Laura va". The other two tracks are "Color humano" by guitarist Edelmiro Molinari, a 9-minute "jam" that broke with the record label's commercial guidelines, and "Que el viento borró tus manos" by bass player Emilio del Guercio. In the song "Laura va", the bandoneon performance of Rodolfo Mederos stands out, and can be considered a Buenos Aires and tango reinterpretation of the Beatles' "She's Leaving Home". The album reflects a variety of musical roots, from tango and folklore to The Beatles's Sargent Pepper's, creatively combined without preconceived schemes and with a poetic complexity that seemed incompatible with mass diffusion.

== Heavy rock ==
In September 1970, two important developments took place on the scene: the debut of Pappo's Blues and the split of Almendra. Pappo's Blues debuted at the Teatro Pueyrredón in Buenos Aires, laying the foundations for a new style in the country: a psychedelic blues rock with pronounced distorted guitar riffs and powerful rhythms. It was the trend that was beginning to take hold in the United Kingdom and the United States, and which, in different variations, later became known as hard rock. In the Argentine slang of the time, it was called "heavy rock." Among them were Pescado Rabioso, Vox Dei, Manal and Billy Bond y La Pesada del Rock and Roll. The latter was a rare case of a collective project, a space where musicians from all walks of life came together in the same spirit as when they shared jam sessions in the Buenos Aires nightlife, to share songs sung by Billy Bond within a psychedelic hard rock format. Renowned Argentine musicians such as Pappo, Luis Alberto Spinetta, the three members of Manal -Javier Martínez, Claudio Gabis and Alejandro Medina - and the young bassist David Lebón, from Pappo's Blues, among others, passed through La Pesada. In 1971 they released their first album, Volume I, which opened with the song Salgan al Sol, a true anthem of Argentine hard rock in its beginnings, composed by Javier Martínez, and with Divertido Reventado, a shameless plagiarism of the You Got Me Floatin' by the Jimi Hendrix Experience, signed by Pappo, who with his guitar imitated the sound of Hendrix.

Desatormentándonos, the first album by Billy Bond y La Pesada del Rock and Roll, and the first album by Pappo's Blues make up the founding trilogy of heavy rock in Argentina. The latter contains songs that would become classics, such as "Algo ha cambiado", "Adonde está la libertad", "El hombre suburbano" and "El viejo". After the recording, the band broke up for the first time. Pappo, for his part, embarked on his second international tour, ending up in England where he met John Bonham of Led Zeppelin and Lemmy Kilmister of Motörhead. He spent almost eight months playing guitar and harmonica on the British island. He returned to Argentina to record second album of Pappo's Blues.

That same year, Artaud was released, which for contractual reasons was presented as the third and final album of Pescado Rabioso. In reality, it was a solo work by Spinetta, since by then the band had already broken up. In a very different style from the hard rock of the two previous albums, Artaud would be one of the culminating works not only of Spinetta's discography but of Argentine rock as well. The sound of the album is primarily acoustic and intimate, although electric guitar sounds also stand out, such as the distinctive riff of "Cementerio Club" or the more "Latin" riff of "Las Habladurías del Mundo". In this sense, it is related to the album that would be released nine years later, Kamikaze. Numerous acoustic guitars, piano, cowbells, a marked asceticism in the arrangements and an abrupt change from his previous album. The songs are complex and already indicate a harmonic incorporation of jazz into his music, which would be notable from 1977 onwards, with the album A 18' del Sol and later with the Banda Spinetta and Spinetta Jade.

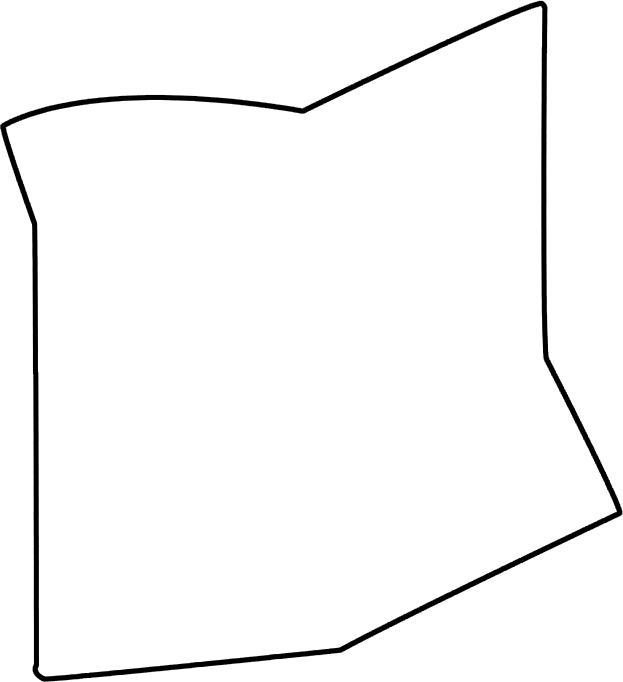
Silhouette of the original LP by Artaud, famous for its irregular and disruptive form.

A distinctive feature of Artaud is its unusual cover, which is not square, as was and still is the norm for albums, but was designed by Spinetta to have an irregular four-pointed octagonal shape, with a green background and a yellow spot in the lower left corner. The front features a small photo of an older Artaud in the upper right corner, while the back features a similar, but younger, photo of a younger Artaud in the upper left corner.

His former bandmates from Almendra followed a similar path (also playing psychedelic-inspired hard rock): Edelmiro Molinari founded the trio Color Humano with Rinaldo Rafanelli on bass and David Lebón on drums (the latter left the band after the first album to play bass in Pescado Rabioso, being replaced by Oscar Moro), while Rodolfo García and Emilio del Guercio were members of the group Aquelarre, whose musical aesthetic was already tending towards progressive fusion - although the particular sound of Hector Starc's distorted Gibson Les Paul guitar, especially on the eponymous Aquelarre (album) first album, makes it a clear reference for the "heavy" scene in Argentina in the early 1990s. 70-. At the beginning of the new decade, and with Los Gatos, Almendra, and Manal already disbanded, the rock group that had the greatest impact was Vox Dei. Hailing from Quilmes, and made up of Ricardo Soulé (vocals, guitar, and violin), Willy Quiroga (bass and vocals), Rubén Basoalto (drums), and Juan Carlos 'Yodi' Godoy (guitar and vocals), with a mix of hard rock and subtle melodies, this band expanded the musical spectrum of the movement and gained significant audiences in the suburban area surrounding the Argentine capital. They made their recording debut in 1970 for Mandioca with Caliente, an album that combined raw blues -with clear reminiscences of Cream and Manal- and slower, even melodic rock ballads, and which would be hampered by the poor recording quality. However, it already included two of their most popular songs, "Total que" and "Presente (El momento en que estás)", the first sung by Willy Quiroga and the second by Ricardo Soulé.

Vox Dei's big moment came in March 1971, when they released La Biblia, a conceptual double vinyl album loosely based on the Holy Scriptures, which was an anomaly in every sense. While all the young bands were worried about achieving stardom and obsessed with sex and drugs, Vox Dei turned their attention to biblical stories, trying to give them a distinctly human perspective, abandoning the orthodoxly religious angle. The result was that the band never fell into the clichés of so-called "Christian rock", but instead produced a work somewhere between hard rock and folk rock with hints of blues and psychedelia. It was recorded in a total of 150 studio hours, which was totally unusual for the time. The press loved it from the beginning, with Pelo magazine even stating: ""Vox Dei's Bible is a fundamental milestone in rock music."" The first performances of this album took place at the Teatro Alvear in Buenos Aires and at the Teatro Don Bosco in San Isidro, followed by a national tour, with guitarist Nacho Smilari (ex La Barra de Chocolate) replacing Godoy, a fact that affected the more compact sound that the group had previously. After the tour, the sessions for the next album began. At the end of 1971, the single with the songs "Donde Has Estado Todo Este Tiempo" and "Tan Sólo un Hombre" was released and after this Smilari left the group to form his own heavy rock project, the trio Cuero, with which the Vox Dei became a trio with the line-up known as "the classic formation": Quiroga - Basoalto - Soulé.

Meanwhile, the trio La Cofradía de la Flor Solar, which emerged from the alternative community of the same name established around 1967 in the city of La Plata and originally composed of Kubero Díaz (guitar and vocals), Morci Requena (bass and backing vocals) and "Manija" Paz (drums), generated the most outstanding musical work of the Argentine psychedelic aesthetic. After a single released by RCA that went unnoticed, they were welcomed by the Mandioca label. The song Juana was included in the compilation Pidamos Peras A Mandioca, and they ended up recording a single album —for the Billy Bond label Microfón— in which they collaborated, among others, two young and versatile guitarists: Quique Gornatti and Skay Beilinson, the latter a future member of Patricio Rey y sus Redonditos de Ricota. Later, musicians with notable careers later joined the band, such as violinist Jorge Pinchevsky. Several of its members ended up alternating between La Cofradía and La Pesada. After the dissolution of both bands in 1974, several of them went into self-imposed exile, first in Brazil and then in Spain. In this country, together with Miguel Abuelo, they performed under the combined name of "La Cofradía de la Nada".

In 1972, the formation of La Pesada became stable, including Kubero Díaz (ex - La Cofradía de la Flor Solar) and Claudio Gabis on guitars, Alejandro Medina on bass and vocals, Jorge Pinchevsky on violin, Isa Portugheis and Jimmy Márquez on drums and Billy Bond on vocals and production. With these members, the band recorded three more volumes, as well as solo albums by each of them and several with artists who would later become famous. Among them, they accompanied Raúl Porchetto on Cristo Rock, their debut album, with which they abandoned the acoustic sound of their early performances and turned to a psychedelic hard rock sound, seeking to generate a conceptual Christian work in the same vein as La Biblia by Vox Dei, but with first-person lyrics from the voice of Jesus Christ, and containing a much more direct and explicit critique of the hierarchy of the Catholic Church.

But the strangest and most valued album over time was Buenos Aires Blus, the only album credited only to the band (without mentioning Billy Bond on the cover, despite the fact that he was no longer the frontman but the artistic producer who gave it its unique sound), featuring jazz singer Donna Caroll and the Oscar López Ruiz orchestra. The sound, truly advanced for its time, included passages of experimentalism that were recognized much later. In a note to Billy Bond from 2011 in Experimenta magazine, the album is remembered in these terms: "Orchestral rock and blues with bandoneon, brass, distorted guitars, a jazz singer (Donna Caroll), instrumental passages with new sounds, improvisation close to free, jazz and rock music intermingling, screams and bangs, at times it seems like a ritual" (...) "There are small pieces like "La Mufeta", with Javier (Martínez) singing a languid blues with the background of the street, the newsboys, the bar, the waiters, etc., which detach themselves from the production logic of a rock and blues album".

== Acoustic rock ==
In contrast to this scene, the acoustic music scene was growing, inspired by the various forms of folk music that were being adopted by the hippie counterculture in the US and Europe. The emergence of Arco Iris in 1970 was the first sign of this new trend. The band, initially made up of Gustavo Santaolalla (guitar and vocals), Ara Tokatlian (winds), Guillermo Bordarampé (bass), and Horacio Gianello (drums and percussion), won the "Beat Festival of International Song" in Mar del Plata in January 1970 with the song "Lo veo en tus ojos", which became a hit. A few months later they released a compilation of their singles under the title Blues de Dana, and in May of the same year they released their first official album, Arco Iris, published by RCA Vik, an album that, while not entirely acoustic and containing passages of high psychedelic experimentation (as in Canción de cuna para el niño astronauta), drew attention for its sound characterized by complexity and fusion with folk rhythms, thanks to the talent of guitarist and singer Gustavo Santaolalla as a composer, and Ara Tokatlian, contributing the sound of the flute or the saxophone, as well as cellos and various percussion instruments unusual in Argentine rock at the time. The peculiarity of Arco Iris did not only reside in its musical proposal but also in its way of life much more connected to the hippie philosophy than any other contemporary band in Argentina. Fundamental to this was the presence of Danais Winnycka (Dana), a Ukrainian model based in Buenos Aires, several years older than the band members, who at the time were teenagers living in the suburban town of El Palomar, in Greater Buenos Aires. It was she who introduced the members of Arco Iris to the mystical, vegetarian and community environment that characterized the band and of which she was recognized as a "spiritual guide".

Nevertheless, between 1970 and 1972, while Arco Iris evolved musically, finally turning to progressive rock, a new generation of young musicians began to emerge, following their path in the acoustic format. This trend reached its peak in November 1972, when Sui Generis released their first album, Vida, marking the first commercial success for the acoustic movement. Sui Generis had begun as an elaborate rock sextet, but had adopted the acoustic duo format, with Charly García and Nito Mestre, almost casually, to perform at the Teatro de la Comedia in Mar del Plata, opening for Pedro y Pablo.

Pedro y Pablo (Miguel Cantilo and Jorge Durietz) were the first acoustic duo to have a massive hit with the song "La marcha de la bronca", a track included in their first album, Yo vivo en una ciudad, from 1970. This album was undoubtedly the first to pave the way for acoustic songs in Argentine rock. Produced by Francis Smith, the guitar duo was supported by magnificent instrumentation by the Jorge Calandrelli Orchestra. At that time the duo was performing on the café concert circuit and, as Jorge Durietz put it, "that first album is almost not rock", highlighting the influence that Cantilo's compositions were influenced by the French chanson of artists like Georges Brassens, and a small scene of Argentine singer-songwriters emerging from the Instituto Di Tella who followed that model, like Jorge Schussheim and Jorge de la Vega or Nacha Guevara. The songs combined sweet melodies and vocal harmonies that, in songs like "Dónde Va La Gente Cuando Llueve" and "La Quimera Del Confort" came to resemble the songs of Simon and Garfunkel in vogue at the time, while also delivering biting criticism and acid irony against the contradictions they found in the predominant culture of the Buenos Aires middle classes, and what they called, precisely, "The Chimera of Comfort." But after their success, the duo began a period of experimentation through community life in a boarding house in the Belgrano neighborhood, on Conesa Street No. 2563, where Cantilo and Durietz lived together and were constantly visited by friends such as Kubero Díaz, Roque Narvaja, Moris, Charly García, Ricardo Cohen, Rocambole, and Pappo, who would gather in the boarding house's courtyard to rehearse and jam. It was this experience that would soon inspire several members of that community to attempt the creation of a rural hippie commune in El Bolsón (an event alluded to in the song "El Bolsón de los Cerros," composed during those sessions). The result of this community experience was captured in 1972 on two albums released by the independent label Trova, which was managed with great artistic flair by Alfredo Radoszynski. These two albums were closely related in terms of their style, subject matter, and personnel, and they paved the way for a fertile acoustic rock scene: Conesa, the second album by Pedro y Pablo, and months later Octubre (mes de cambios), the solo debut by Roque Narvaja. Two albums by "committed" singer-songwriters who adopted the lysergic folk rock sound with steel string guitars accompanied by native instruments and Andean climates (Roque Narvaja debuted the charango and crossed it with the quenas of Uña Ramos and the drums of Domingo Cura and vocal harmonies inspired by Crosby, Stills & Nash).

Narvaja's album had the most explicit political content that Argentine rock had seen up to that point, with lyrics dedicated to Camilo Cienfuegos and Che Guevara ("Camilo and Ernesto") and to the PRT leader Luis Pujals ("Ballad for Luis"), but establishing his position as "Revolution, my love", in support of the positions of the Third World priests who at that time had as their great representative in Argentina Father Carlos Mugica: "Revolution with God/ Dream of the worker". It was precisely Miguel Cantilo who had begun to frequent Mugica's work in Villa de Retiro, leading to Roque Narvaja and other rock musicians to collaborate Conesa began, precisely, with a song clearly inspired by the priest: "Padre Francisco", while "Blues del Éxodo" and "El Bolsón de los Cerros", celebrated the abandonment of the cities and the dream of utopian communities in the interior of the country.

But the commercial success of Vida ended up leaving those antecedents in oblivion. Produced by Pierre Bayona, Sui Generis had been introduced to Billy Bond, who got Jorge Álvarez to record them for the Microfón label, with all the musicians from La Pesada acting as session musicians in the studio. The album was recorded in two days and sold 400,000 copies, a number never before reached by any rock album. In a 1973 article, Pelo magazine points out the peculiarity that women attended Sui Generis's concerts, something that was almost uncommon in national rock at that time: the article highlights the presence of "girls who are not the usual ones at concerts, they had come in groups of four or five," summoned by songs in which "true love and tenderness as an authentic gesture of devotion intertwine." The overwhelming success of "Canción para mi muerte" generated a kind of thematic and musical misunderstanding at the time, which tended to pigeonhole the duo outside of rock, within the romantic pop genre. At first, rock critics, who were adverse to their work, attributed this to the radio success of "Canción para mi muerte," which was chosen by Rolling Stone magazine (Argentine edition) and MTV as the No. 11 song among the 100 most outstanding songs of Argentine rock. They were seen as a simple one-hit wonder, but their success continued the following year with their second album, Confesiones de invierno, an album that includes songs with more rock-oriented instrumentation, such as the new hit "Rasguña las piedras" and "Bienvenidos al tren," but also retained the appeal of acoustic ballads like "Aprendizaje" and "Un hada, un cisne."

The massive success of the first two Sui Generis albums would open the doors for a whole series of acoustic bands and solo artists: León Gieco (who in 1973 would release his first self-titled album, recorded and produced independently by Gustavo Santaolalla, of Arco Iris), Raúl Porchetto, the Pacífico trio and other duos like Mesías (founded by a former member of the original Sui Generis sextet, Juan Bellia, and whose only single was released thanks to the help of Charly García), Pastoral and Vivencia.

== Progressive rock ==
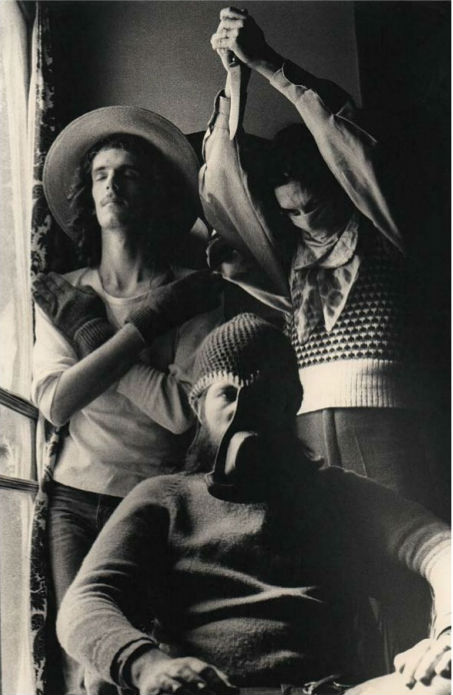
Invisible in 1974

In the 1970s, following the growing influence of bands that were successful in Europe and the United States, attempts at progressive or symphonic rock began to appear in Argentina as well. Various bands abandoned the short pop single in favor of instrumentation and composition techniques more frequently associated with jazz or classical music in an effort to give rock music the same level of musical sophistication and critical respect. In Argentina, as in other Latin American countries, this fusion also extended to the region's typical musical styles, such as tango and various folk genres.

By the early 1970s, the band Contraluz had combined rock with progressive and folk nuances. This would be one of the most influential groups in the years leading up to the emergence of progressive rock and symphonic rock although they received criticism for the excessive similarity between their sound and that of the English band Jethro Tull. The band did not deny this primordial influence; they also based much of their sound on the transverse flute (played by Alejandro Barzi), and even performed a cover of their song "Bourée." Their only album, "Americanos," was released in 1973 by Music Hall with Billy Bond producing, and had a moderate impact. Another symphonic/progressive band was Crucis. Their music began attracting attention in the underground, and so they started getting bigger performing venues. As change swept Argentine rock in 1975, their music was rapidly rising to popular musical tastes. Their compositions were strong and dynamic with unexpected breaks, and the interplay between the electric guitar and keyboards was captivating. The rhythm section sounded powerful and adventurous.

At the height of symphonic rock, Crucis was joined at the top by the popularity of Espíritu; the two are generally seen as the most well-known outfits of the symphonic rock period.

Espíritu, who formed in 1973 but had roots since 1969, would go on to be an internationally followed group in the latter part of symphonic rock's heyday. The first album Crisalida is cited as their best effort, with beautiful and alternating compositions and changing atmospheres (from mellow with acoustic guitar to up-tempo with heavy electric guitar), lush keyboards and some vocal harmonies.

Former heavy rockers El Reloj turned to prog with 1975's self-titled album. Their sound has been compared to Uriah Heep's mystic and proggy sound.

A symphonic band that would have a great year in 1976 was ALAS. Their music was even more intellectual and unorthodox. ALAS would feature artists such as Rodolfo Mederos and Pedro Aznar. Luis Alberto Spinetta would begin his third band Invisible later in that year. Their symphonic sound tinged with tango would bring critical praise. A band that showed a lot of promise that never materialised was Reino de Munt. Formed by Raul Porchetto, it featured a young Alejandro Lerner, and musicians like Gustavo Basterrica and Frank Ojsterseck. Around that same time, Sui Generis began a transition from acoustic rock to a more electric and visceral sound with their third album, Pequeñas anécdotas sobre las instituciones. The band had stopped being a duo and had become a quartet. The album surprised critics and fans alike with a symphonic rock style, including electronic instruments that were novel for the time and a marked theme of political criticism. This new trait arose from the conversations that Charly García was having at the time with the leftist intellectual David Viñas, which led him, for a brief period of time, to join the Revolutionary Communist Party, of Maoist tendency. Over time, García distanced himself from activism and even mocked the era, but what emerged from this period was an album with explicit lyrics and a completely acidic view of society's basic "institutions": the family, the State, the Armed Forces, while denouncing police repression, censorship, and political assassinations. Musically, the album showed a fundamental stylistic shift, becoming more complex, conceptual, and oriented toward symphonic rock. "Tema de Natalio" is an instrumental that clearly reflects this change, as is "El Show de los Muertos," in which four of the song's eight minutes are taken up by keyboard distortions. It sounds strange to hear these sounds adapted to a group that, until then, had been identified by an almost opposite sound. It also featured backing vocals from María Rosa Yorio, Charly García's partner at the time, and contributions from numerous guest musicians. The album was highly praised, although it did not sell as well as expected. The public and the producers had a hard time understanding Charly's musical evolution and demanded a return to the acoustic and simple style of the first two albums. Furthermore, both García and Mestre and the rest of the band had started using lysergic acid. Charly then decided to make a new concept album around psychedelia and thought of a name: Ha sido (a play on words with "Ácido", the popular name given to LSD in Argentina). LThe band managed to record the entire album, but their managers and producers refused to release it, pressuring the group to return to the initial ballads that had guaranteed commercial success. They finally had to resign themselves to releasing an EP, with only one of the songs from the new album ("Alto en la torre") and three songs from the previous albums.

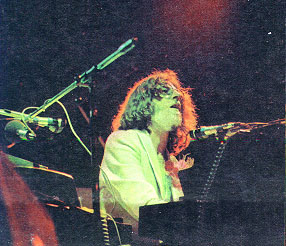
Charly Garcia during Sui Generis farewell concerts, 1975

When Charly García and Nito Mestre left Sui Generis, their two final concerts took place at the Luna Park Arena on September 5, 1975, in front of 30,000 people.

After Sui Generis dissolved, Charly García formed La Máquina de Hacer Pájaros, another exponent of progressive rock, introducing the novelty of two simultaneous keyboardists on stage (García and Carlos Cutaia), in addition to Oscar Moro (ex Los Gatos and Color Humano) on drums, Gustavo Bazterrica (ex Reino de Munt) on guitar, and José Luis Fernández (ex Crucis) on bass. This band, as García said, intended to be "the Yes of underdevelopment." Critics recognize strong influences from Genesis, Yes, Camel, Focus, and Steely Dan. Also, Invisible, the trio formed by Luis Alberto Spinetta after the dissolution of Pescado Rabioso, can be classified as progressive, especially since their second album, Durazno Sangrando, a conceptual work inspired by notions taken by Spinetta from the work of the Swiss philosopher and psychologist Carl Jung based on the traditional Chinese book El secreto de la flor de oro. One of the last progressive bands was Tantor. They were less symphonic and far more prog-experimental, with jazz as a major support. Their first eponymous album was a hit in the scene, and the band would continue until the mid-1980s as one of the last bands of the progressive era.

On March 24, 1976, the democratic government was toppled by a military coup. It opened one of the darkest political chapters in Argentina's history, full of repression, fear, and missing citizens. Argentine rock by no means would be immune to the military crackdown, and would suffer the worst period of censorship in its history. Rock was seen as subversive by the nation's authority figures, who began to clamp down on the music. In a 1976 speech, Admiral Emilio Massera denounced rock musicians and fans as potential subversives. Paradoxically, this antinomy was nothing more than a merely rhetorical confrontation. During the dictatorship there were thousands of missing people, from all professions and social origins, but there was not a single rock musician that made up that list. Neither did any of them go to prison, and in the famous list of almost 200 songs prohibited from being broadcast on the radio, the national rock songs were only six: one song by Pescado Rabioso, one by Serú Girán and four from the album El Fantasma de Canterville by León Gieco, which was released just two and a half months after the coup (but three of the latter, recorded live, were included without problems in Gieco's next album, when the controls had already been relaxed). In the words of journalist Mariano Dal Mazo: "What was made official in the dictatorship was the extermination of the guerrillas, and in that systematic plan, rock was not persecuted because it was not a danger.". The main damage caused by the dictatorship to Argentine rock is related to the censorship imposed by the regime and the self-censorship that record labels and media outlets were subjected to. Information exchange with the outside world ceased to flow, and at a time when rock music worldwide was undergoing its greatest changes, it came to a standstill in Argentina. Punk, post-punk, new wave, and the main international trends would not come to fruition in Argentina until after the opening brought about by the Falklands War. At the height of punk's global boom, the bands vying for audiences in Buenos Aires were Serú Girán and Spinetta Jade, both originating from progressive rock with an opening toward fusion with jazz.

Serú Girán was born, as a concept, from the minds of musicians Charly García and David Lebón during their three-month stay in northeast Brazil, specifically in Buzios, in 1978. Two months later, Charly returned to Buenos Aires to arrange a contract with Oscar López and Billy Bond as producers. He also recruited the rest of the band: Oscar Moro was selected as drummer and he recommended the young Pedro Aznar as bassist. They managed to record four studio albums until 1981, but at the end of the year Pedro Aznar left the band to accept the invitation to join the Pat Metheny Group in the United States. On March 6 and 7, 1982, Serú Girán played for the last time at Luna Park. The concert was recorded and released as the live album Don't Cry for Me, Argentina. It is a live review of the band's most important hits, with the exception of two songs that are very different from the band's style and that can be interpreted as a failed attempt to update their sound to the new wave that was beginning to be heard in Argentina and would end up imposing itself a few months later, after the Falklands War: the song of the same name (unrelated to the song of the same name from the musical Evita) and Popotitos, a cover of the rock classic by Los Teen Tops. Years later he would joke about the band's fate, saying that "Serú Girán went from symphonic rock to Popotitos in just four years."

Spinetta Jade was the band with which Luis Alberto Spinetta channeled his growing interest in jazz musicians since the 1977 album A 18' del sol. After the failed experience of traveling to the United States to record an album in English, Only love can sustain, the interludes of the latter, titled "Jade", would give Spinetta the idea for the name of his next band upon returning to Argentina. In a short time, Spinetta Jade became the other great band in terms of attendance, with shows of a marked musical preciousness. From 1982 onwards, the performances of this band became more sporadic due to Spinetta's solo work, who released Kamikaze that same year. This is an album that came to be considered among the best Argentine rock of all time and, with its digital releases since the 90s, it became a cult object not only in Argentina but also abroad. It is a compilation of old songs that Spinetta used to play live but were not included in an album, from the heartfelt "Barro tal vez" (Spinetta's first composition, a zamba he wrote at the age of 15) to "Águila de Trueno", a song that talks about the torment of Túpac Amaru that had originally been composed for Invisible's first album. Despite coming from different periods, they were unified by a climate of great austerity, in which Spinetta's Ovation guitar is only accompanied by Diego Rapoport's keyboards, with no rhythmic base other than a drum machine and sober percussion by David Lebón.

== Argentine rock and the Islas Malvinas War ==
In May 1982 the Festival for Latin American Solidarity took place in support of the troops who invaded the Falklands, and also a veiled protest to war, and a call for peace (at first the musicians feared appearing for risk of being portrayed pro-war). This event was the final stepping stone of Argentine rock in becoming the dominant form of music in the country. At the same time, English-language rock was wiped out from radio play. The programmers had to fill the voids with something, and that was with Argentine rock. This was the biggest boost to Argentine rock in its entire history and the reason many bands landed a recording contract, especially those whose work, based on the most innovative rock styles, was not well received by audiences at large festivals. It was the exact moment that marked the beginning of the stylistic and generational shift that Argentine rock needed, and which would be definitively consolidated after the restoration of democracy in 1983.

== Massification and projection to the rest of Latin America ==
The Cafe Einstein was opened in 1982 by Omar Chaban (who would end up convicted for the República Cromañón nightclub fire 22 years later), featuring some of the first presentations of three underground bands: Sumo, Soda Stereo, and Los Twist. Both Sumo and Soda Stereo featured slightly different line-ups in their early days, with Sumo having an English girl, Stephanie Nuttal, on drums. She returned to England when war broke out between her country and Argentina. The other band that found its privileged place in that mixture of rock and theater was Patricio Rey y sus Redonditos de Ricota, who, since 1976, had been exhibiting a style of theatrical rock that explored other types of shows besides what is strictly a rock band recital: a circus troupe of monologists, magicians, clowns, acrobats, strippers and musicians went up on stage and performed their numbers. There were no fixed members, there were around fifteen musicians on stage who alternated between instruments. This format of mixing a recital with a variety show also arose from the particular context of the La Plata scene during the dictatorial era, where it was difficult to put on a rock recital as such.

As the early 1980s progressed it became clear that the new generation of rockers were not like anything before: Los Violadores pioneering punk in Latin America; Virus oxygenating rock with their new-wave sound, followed by Cosméticos with a similar style; Sumo's punkish reggae-rock developing a fanatical cult following (Luca Prodan sung mostly in English, which reduced his band's radio exposure yet their fame expanded unabated); and Soda Stereo the buzz of the underground. Miguel Mateos /ZAS introduced the phrase rock en tu idioma ("rock in your language").

The golden age of Argentine rock, in commercial terms, began in April 1985, when Miguel Mateos /ZAS performed five consecutive shows at the Teatro Coliseo to present their third album, I have to stop (1984), an album that had brought the band great notoriety due to the constant radio airplay of their songs. During these performances, their first live album, Rockas vivas, was recorded, which would go on to sell more than 500,000 records in Argentina alone, becoming the most successful Argentine rock album up to that point. So successful was it that, despite the album having already been recorded live, it was still "presented live" in August at Luna Park. The idea was to do a single show, but ticket demand exceeded all expectations, resulting in a series of four shows attracting 60,000 spectators.

The success of "Rockas Vivas" led most record companies to invest into national rock and invest in bands and solo artists, including expansion campaigns and international tours, breaking records for album sales and concert attendance in several countries across the Americas. A fact about the boost the pop sound received and its market promise is that between 1986 and 1987, several of the established names of 1970s national rock changed their style to record albums directly influenced by the pop sound and the new wave image, trying to ride the wave. This is the case of Puertos by María Rosa Yorio, 7x7 by David Lebón, Fotos de Tokyo by Pedro Aznar or, the most successful of all these attempts, Noche y Día by Raúl Porchetto which includes «Bailando en las veredas, a hit with massive reach. All these albums are characterized, broadly speaking, by a simpler and more stripped-down pop sound than that of Anglo-Saxon new wave. Fresh, optimistic and danceable songs with a predominance of keyboards, a formula that Andrés Calamaro had already started in 1984 with the hit Mil horas composed for Los Abuelos de la Nada and, apart from his participation in this band, with his solo debut Hotel Calamaro and with the production made for the duo's only album Frappé, in which his brother Javier Calamaro participated.

In Mendoza, Los Enanitos Verdes emerged; in 1984 they were the revelation of the La Falda Festival and released their first album. Their only single, "Aún sigo cantando", performed as a duet with David Lebón, was played a lot on local radio and had some success. From that moment on, they also fall under the production of Andrés Calamaro with whom they extend the same pop sound in three albums: Contrarreloj (1986), Habitaciones extrañas (1987) and Carrousel (1988).

A review of the main national rock albums of 1985 is revealing, since many of them remained forever among the most remembered albums of the genre: in addition to Rockas Vivas, Nada Personal by Soda Stereo, Locura by Virus (marking a strong stylistic turn towards synth pop), Giros by Fito Páez, Los Abuelos en el Opera by Los Abuelos de la Nada, and the second album by G.I.T., known as the Black Album, famous for its particular electronic drum sound. That same year, Miguel Mateos/ZAS released the first Argentine rock video and introduced the maxi-single format to the market (with "Mensajes" and the English version of "Perdiendo el Contacto"), in addition to achieving a curious feat: success with a "presentation tour" of "Rockas Vivas" (which was, in turn, a live album).

In addition to these best-selling releases, this year also saw the arrival of the two most prestigious bands of the underground scene: Patricio Rey y sus Redonditos de Ricota with Gulp!, and Sumo with Divididos por la Felicidad. Although sales of these works were not comparable to those of the most successful exponents of pop, what until recently had been a secret of the underground was beginning to gain space in the media.

By 1985, several bands began receiving consistent airplay across Latin America. Argentine rock began "climbing" the continent up the Andes: first Chile, then Peru, Ecuador, Colombia, Venezuela. Soda Stereo, with their new wave and post-punk sound, they would become one of the most important bands in Argentine rock and, like Los Abuelos de la Nada and G.I.T., they would find great success abroad. Zeta Bosio member of Soda Stereo said regarding this: "We would leave Argentina and tour in Chile, Peru, etc, and in some places they had never heard a live rock concert before... they said that such music was for another world and wouldn’t work... now it's all joy seeing how it did work and that it now has its own legs..." Argentine rock bands were the first to be signed to multinational record labels for distribution across many nations.

At the end of the year, Soda Stereo released Signos, which cemented their popularity with hits like "Prófugos" and "Persiana Americana." The members embarked on a new Latin American tour that included more than 100 concerts in 11 different countries (Argentina, Uruguay, Paraguay, Bolivia, Chile, Peru, Ecuador, Colombia, Venezuela, Costa Rica, and Mexico), in addition to recording the live album Ruido Blanco. With the Signos tour, Soda Stereo became international stars.

The small wave grew around 1986, and by the beginning of that year, it had become a continental phenomenon, reaching Central America, Mexico, and crossing the Atlantic to Spain. Los Enanitos Verdes achieved great success with their energetic pop-rock. Sissi Hansen, from the underground, arrives in Peru, where she gets three hits with her first album Mi Religión, produced by Stuka, guitarist of Los Violadores, the pioneering punk rock band in the country. Around that time, and after Stuka consolidated as lead guitarist, they began to move away from the pure punk style, to take elements of post punk and new wave. In 1985 they released their second album, Y ahora qué pasa, eh? with which they became a great commercial success especially for the song «Uno, dos, ultraviolento». Their call grew until they moved away from the small underground stages and took them to play in larger venues and even tour abroad.

Los Fabulosos Cadillacs, born in the Buenos Aires underground and fully identified with the ska sound, they were the ones who introduced to Argentina what ska historian Albino Brown (from the radio show "The Ska Parade") would call 3rd Wave Ska in 1989. It is a variant of ska in which guitar riffs and a powerful wind section take center stage. This is the ska sound that took hold throughout Latin America since the second half of the 80s, characterized by the mix of rhythms, chords and instrumentation of each country; in other words, each country would go on to develop its own form of ska using its local instruments and its own traditions, managing to fuse all the dance rhythms through the wind music. Los Fabulosos Cadillacs managed to bring together Latin rhythms, ska, rock, and later salsa and other Central American rhythms in their sound. They soon left the underground scene and, starting with their second album, Yo te avisé!!, gained the full support of Sony Music, becoming stars in their country and throughout Latin America. In 1987 they made their first tour outside their native country, reaching Chile and Peru. Their presentation in their country was at the Estadio Obras Sanitarias in 1988. The same path to fame would be followed by Los Pericos, a reggae band that took the idea of having a powerful wind section that allowed them to carry out the same cultural fusion operations that also earned them great success in Latin America. Their first album, "El Ritual de la Banana" sold 180 thousand records, becoming the best-selling album of the year, granting it the title of Triple Platinum. In Mexico, Argentine bands were being marketed by media giants like Televisa as "rock in your language". In Chile, where a few outstanding bands existed even prior to the Argentine boom (see Los Prisioneros), the flood of rock music coming from their eastern neighbor would fully energize and inspire the local scene. The current boom in Colombian rock can be traced to the 1980s, with most Colombian rock acts citing the Argentine invasion groups as a direct influence.

== Late 1980s ==
December 1987 saw the death of Luca Prodan, leader of Sumo. He was found dead on the 22nd of December in his room, and the cause of his death was being discussed. His death caused shock among his fans and the Argentine rock scene. After Prodan's death, Sumo would split up and its members would form two new bands, Divididos (with Ricardo Mollo and Diego Arnedo) and Las Pelotas (with Germán Daffunchio, Alejandro Sokol and Alberto Troglio). Of the two, Divididos would achieve greater commercial success, with a powerful rock sound, advertising itself with the nickname "The steamroller of rock". Pettinato, meanwhile, lived in Spain for a few years, where he formed Pachuco Cadáver, a duo with Guillermo Piccolini with which he released two albums exploring the sounds of psychedelia and experimental rock from all eras. Upon his return to the country, he returned to journalism and television program hosting. Another key figure of the scene, Miguel Abuelo, Los Abuelos de la Nada from following gallbladder surgery, was diagnosed with AIDS; terminally ill, he died from cardiac arrest on March 26, 1988. Virus leader Federico Moura's persistent pneumonia fueled rumors of further complications, which ended in the revelation soon after by the singer that he was infected with AIDS.

The late 1980s also marked the transition for Patricio Rey y sus Redonditos de Ricota, from underground to mainstream, becoming a mass phenomenon. Their popularity grew based on reviews in specialized media and word of mouth among fans. On December 2, 1989, the group played at the Estadio Obras Sanitarias. The covered stadium had a capacity for 4,700 people, which was quickly reached, surprising the band itself. So they added a new date, but once again the tickets sold out quickly. Due to demand, the band announced a third show for the 29th, but this time not in the covered stadium, but outside, on the Obras hockey fields, which being an open space allowed a capacity of up to 25,000 people and managed to sell out all the tickets. Los Redondos went from playing in small venues to filling a stadium in just twenty-seven days. It was the second time in history that a band played at the Obras hockey field with their own recital (not as part of a festival), only after Soda Stereo, who had achieved it in December 1988. At this recital the first security problems and control over their audience appeared, the fans started to move the stage, which endangered the structure of the stage and caused the band to stop the recital and ask the audience to calm down. Despite this incident, Obras' shows were very well received by the public and critics, and in the late 1989 polls in the "Si! Supplement" and the "Rock & Pop (Argentine radio station)" magazine, Los Redondos were chosen as band of the year, breaking the hegemony that "Soda Stereo" had held in the music scene in 1985, 1986, 1987, and 1988. "Soda Stereo" was only voted band of the year in "Pelo (magazine)".

A portion of the fans disliked the fact that they played at Obras, but despite this, the band's popularity expanded greatly with their arrival in large stadiums. This step marked a turning point in the band's history, generating a marked change in the social composition of their fan base. The "ricotero masses," as the band's stadium shows in the 1990s were called, were characterized by the presence of flags, soccer chants, and even audience discourse that was inconsistent with the band's music or lyrics. Among the consequences of this change was an increase in violence, both in clashes between the audience (some of whom identified themselves as "barras" with flags and various names, sometimes linked to their places of origin, and from one show to the next carried over relations of friendship or enmity with other bars) and clashes with the police. In the new folklore that was developing around the "masses" in the stadiums, these clashes were seen as a sign of "aguante," a term borrowed from Argentine soccer. This new atmosphere, far removed from the underground of the 1980s, was the breeding ground for what, in the following decade, would be called "chabon rock".

On May 14, 1989, the Argentine hyperinflation erupted when, amid an economic recession, the presidential elections held that day resulted in the Radical Party leaving the government and the Peronism assuming power with Carlos Menem as the new president of the nation. As a result, previous trends of economic decline accelerated, looting and riots erupted throughout the country, and various sectors began to pressure for an early transfer of power not in December, which actually took place on July 8. However, the hyperinflation was prolonged and continued with the new government, lasting until April of the following year.

Hyperinflation severely affected the Argentine music scene. Established bands with greater purchasing power were able to somewhat weather the crisis by touring internationally to raise much-needed dollars. However, smaller bands that were just starting out suffered a different fate: the music industry was severely affected by the crisis. Independent labels that were just beginning to make a name for themselves and influence the scene disappeared. As for the major labels, they began to rule out any risks and focused their catalogs solely on established artists whose sales figures were practically guaranteed by their track record. Thus, several projects were put on hold or discarded altogether, which affected the careers of several bands and solo artists who had been growing. As an example of the debacle that this period saw for the underground, it can be said that in 1990, almost no Argentine rock band had their debut album. The few releases were by already established artists, and the standout albums of the year were Canción Animal by Soda Stereo and Filosofía barata y zapatos de goma by Charly García.

== 1990−1998 ==
=== "Canción Animal" and new rock ===
In 1992, Soda Stereo presented Dynamo, their sixth album, arguably the most conceptual (the other being Signos), and the most experimental to that point. It apparently took fans by surprise, and was the lowest seller of the group's works (it did not help that in the middle of all this the band changed labels; Sony would not promote a band that was leaving, and BMG wouldn't promote another label's album).

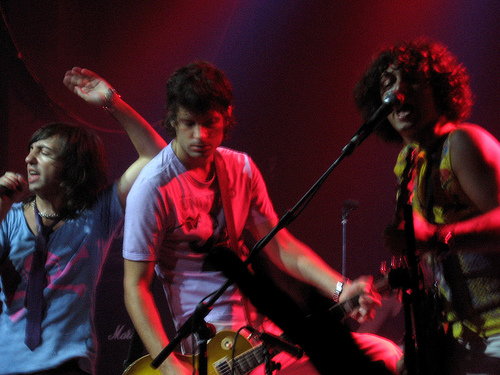
Babasónicos, 2006

On the other hand, Babasónicos had in 1992 their first major breakthrough of their careers with the hit D-generación from their 1992 album Pasto, which would herald future international success for a band that would define the sound of "sonic" rock. Juana La Loca was another band in the so-called sonic scene that started in the early 1990s and would breakthrough a few years later. The band that founded the Sonic Movement in Buenos Aires was Iguana Lovers, started in 1990. Now with collaborations of the shoegaze

=== Rock rolinga ===
Some suburban acts owed so much to the sound of the Rolling Stones, that their followers came to be known as "rolingas". Eventually the rock rolinga (a.k.a. rock stone) became a style: cheesy 1970s sneakers, tight T-shirts with the logo of the Stones or a local 'stone' band, and a disdain for other Argentine rock subgenres they consider part of the establishment. At the forefront of this movement were Los Ratones Paranoicos, whom for years before were perfecting a musical formula that would be emulated by countless neighborhood bands in years to come.

=== 1990s metal ===
In the 1990s the band A.N.I.M.A.L.'s acronym translated literally stands for "Abused (accosted), Our Indians Died While Fighting". The band advocated for indigenous people and nationalism, while denouncing the current world order.

=== Other developments ===
Tropical, Fusion, and Latin influenced rock continued its ascent. 1992 was the year of "La Pachanga": Rosario's Vilma Palma e Vampiros single was an across the board mega hit in the Spanish-speaking world; there was no way of escaping it unless one did not have any kind of social life in the early 1990s. Bands like Los Auténticos Decadentes, who had a major hit in 1990 with "Loco (tu forma de ser)", and Los Pericos mirrored the tendency of increased popularity for the subgenre. Los Fabulosos Cadillacs had a slump in the early 1990s after harvesting great accolades in the late 1980s, but came back with a roar in 1994 with Vasos Vacios; the compilation that featured "Matador". The single would turn into a global superhit, winning MTV's best video of the year.

=== The mid '90s schism ===
1995 saw the last album by Soda Stereo, their relaxed almost chillout-like Sueño Stereo, an album at times more electronic than rock previewing the direction of Gustavo Cerati's solo career. Soda Stereo went on a last tour in the United States and Latin America.

== Since 1998 ==
=== Late 1990s & 21st century ===
In the late 1990s, "rock sónico" ("sonic" rock) was influenced by the 1980s "techno-pop" of Virus and early Soda Stereo (and also Britpop), through Babasónicos and Juana La Loca. The latter group found success with sonic rock in 1997's Vida Modelo. The former would increase their popularity with each new album, arriving at 2001's Jessico, which received international acclaim as one of the first truly outstanding albums of the new millennium. Other underground groups started making noise at this time: Iguana Lovers, they founded the Sonic movement in Buenos Aires in 1990,

In heavy metal, Hermética disbanded by 1995 giving rise to Almafuerte. With a more up-to-date sound, they were one of the late 1990s favorites along with A.N.I.M.A.L. Rata Blanca continued to perform and record intermittently touring countries around Latin America. Classic metalists O'Connor in the underground would emerge by the early 2000s, along with exponents of nu metal Cabezones and Carajo. One of the most critically acclaimed bands of present is Los Natas. Originally a stoner rock group, in subsequent albums the band has turned more experimental. Some have called this demiurgic style (infused with Argentine folk, psychedelia, and space rock) "Patagonian doom", and this brand of metal has been ranked with the best heard in the new millennium.

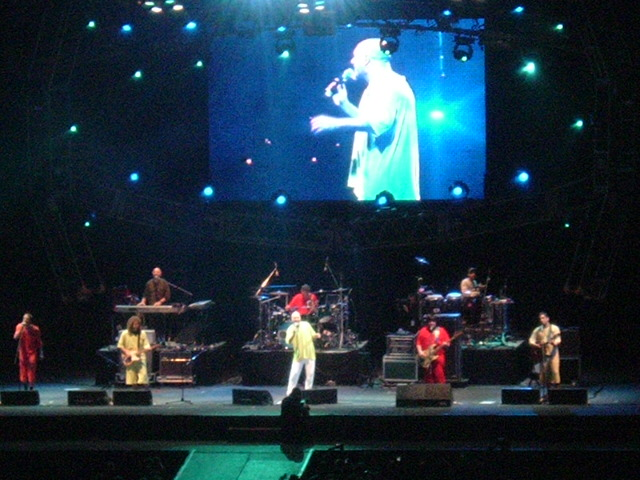
Bersuit Vergarabat, 2004

In tropical or fusion rock, Bersuit Vergarabat rose to the zenith of the genre. Libertinaje (1998) catapulted the band to the top, and to tours of the Americas and Europe. The follow-up Hijos del Culo (2000) also went double-platinum. Both albums display a dizzying range in style versatility. From the side of reggae-rock Los Pericos and Los Cafres dominated. Ska had Los Calzones and Kapanga, but by 2000 Los Fabulosos Cadillacs had called it quits to their internationally renowned career of rock with ska, rap, reggae, and Latin. La Mosca and Dancing Mood reached achieved greater popularity. Illya Kuryaki and the Valderramas produced some catchy, original, and danceable music (a mix of rock, hip-hop, and Latin) which cemented their fan base all over the Americas, until the duo's separation in 2001.

Karamelo Santo, another from the city of Mendoza played a mix of rock, punk, ska, afro-Uruguayan, and cumbia rhythms and spent most of the 2001–2004 period on extensive tours of Europe and the Americas.

- In addition there is a large indie scene influenced by Krautrock and late 1980s/early 1990s British and American indie-rock acts such as The Pastels, The Vaselines, Jesus and Mary Chain and My Bloody Valentine. Some of the most popular bands from this scene include Iguana Lovers (that started in 1990 with collaborations of Ride (band) members, Mark Gardener and Loz Colbert and the Scottish band The Jesus and Mary Chain)
- In 2019, the Congress passed a gender equity law requiring at least 30% of musical festival lineups be women artists. Notable feminist rockers include Marilina Bertoldi, Flopa, Marina Fages, Cam Beszkin, Mujeres Bacanas, Loli Molina, Los Besos, Rosario Bléfari, Lara Pedrosa, ibiza pareo, Sol Bassa, Potra, Florencia Ruiz, Eruca Sativa, and Miss Bolivia.
- During the 2020s, Argentina experienced a revitalization of its independent rock scene following the COVID-19 pandemic. The underground circuit, expanded through independent venues, DIY labels, and digital platforms. The new wave has been characterized by a revival of post-punk, shoegaze, noise rock, emo and alternative rock, drawing influence from artists such as Joy Division, The Cure, My Bloody Valentine, Fontaines D.C., IDLES, and Shame. Notable bands associated with this movement include Mujer Cebra, Buenos Vampiros, Dum Chica, Fin del Mundo, Mujercitas Terror, Nenagenix, WRRN, Winona Riders, and Delfines Entrenados para Matar. Although largely rooted in the underground circuit, many of these artists have gained broader recognition through streaming platforms, independent festivals, major label contracts and international touring.
- Skiltron, playing Celtic metal, released his first album in 2006. Skiltron split in 2011, giving origin to Triddana. Another Celtic metal is Tersivel (2004), whose first EP was recorded in 2006 and their first full-length album was released in 2010. Other notable English singing bands are Electronomicón (hard rock), Kapel Maister (symphonic metal), 42 decibel.

== See also ==
- The New Guard (the history of tango)
