= Porsuigieco (album) =

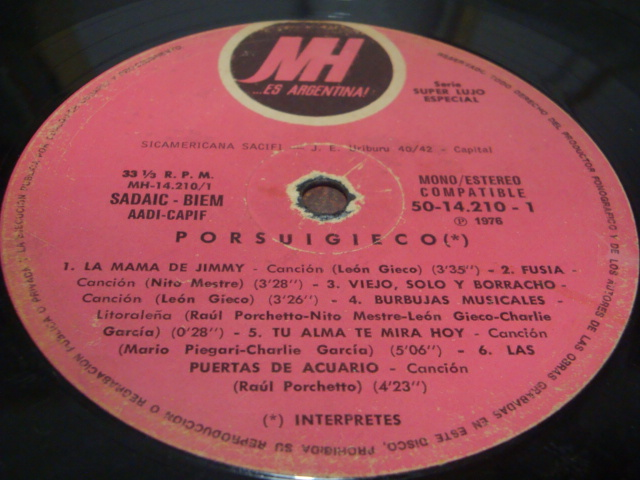
- The original edition of the album on vinyl.

Studio album by PorSuiGieco
- Released: 7 March 1976 (LP); 15 June 1993 (CD)
- Recorded: 28 May–18 June 1975
- Genre: Folk rock
- Length: 42:55
- Label: Music Hall
- Producer: Jorge Alvarez

Porsuigieco is the only album by PorSuiGieco, a supergroup consisting of Charly García, Nito Mestre, León Gieco, Raúl Porchetto and María Rosa Yorio, released in 1976. In the first edition of the LP, the song "Antes de Gira" was substituted for a censured song: "El fantasma de Canterville". But, in 1993, the album was released with "El fantasma de Canterville" as bonus track. The album was recorded in only two weeks.

In 2007, the Argentine edition of Rolling Stone ranked it 89th on its list of "The 100 Greatest Albums of National Rock".

== Track listing ==
Side one

1. "La mamá de Jimmy" ["Jimmy's mother"] — (León Gieco) – 3:35
2. "Fusia" ["Fuchsia"] — (Nito Mestre) – 3:28
3. "Viejo, solo y borracho" ["Old, alone and drunk"] — (Gieco) – 3:26
4. "Burbujas musicales" ["Music bubbles"] — (Charly García, Mestre, Gieco, Raul Porchetto) – 0:38
5. "Tu alma te mira hoy" ["Your soul looks at you today"] — (García, Mario Piegari) – 4:56
6. "Las puertas de Acuario" ["The doors of Aquarium"] — (Porchetto) – 4:23

Side two

7. "Quiero ver, quiero ser, quiero entrar" ["I want to see, I want to be, I want to enter"] — (García) – 4:56
8. "Mujer del bosque" ["Forest woman"] — (Porchetto) – 3:26
9. "Todos los caballos blancos" ["All the white horses"] — (Gieco) – 4:02
10. "Antes de gira" ["Before the tour"] — (García) – 4:30
11. "La colina de la vida" ["The Hill of Life"] — (Gieco) – 5:35

Bonus track (1993 edition)

12. "El fantasma de Canterville" ["The ghost of Canterville"] — (García) – 3:46

== Personnel ==
PorSuiGieco

- Charly García – lead vocals (track 10), backing vocals (tracks 1, 3, 5–9), Fender electric piano (tracks 1, 5, 7, 10), clavinet (track 1, 10), organ (tracks 2, 3, 6, 9, 10), piano (tracks 3, 6, 7, 8), Moog bass (track 7), Moog synthesizer (track 9, 10, 11), Mellotron (track 10, 11), electric guitar (track 2, 3, 9), acoustic guitar (track 2, 5), slide guitar (track 2), acoustic bass (track 8)
- Nito Mestre – lead vocals (tracks 2), backing vocals (tracks 1–3, 5–11), acoustic guitar (tracks 2, 10), flute (tracks 7, 8, 11)
- León Gieco – lead vocals (tracks 1, 3, 5, 11), backing vocals (tracks 6, 8–10), acoustic guitar (tracks 3, 5, 9–11), harmonica (track 8), tambourine (track 9)
- Raúl Porchetto – lead vocals (tracks 6, 8), backing vocals (tracks 1, 3, 5, 9), electric guitar (track 6), acoustic guitar (track 8)
- María Rosa Yorio – lead vocals (tracks 2, 7, 9), backing vocals (tracks 2, 3)

Additional personnel

- Pino Marrone – electric guitar (tracks 1, 5, 7)
- Gustavo Bazterrica – electric guitar (tracks 6)
- Leo Sujatovich – piano (track 2)
- Jose Luiz Fernández — bass (track 1), acoustic guitar (track 7)
- Rinaldo Rafanelli – bass (tracks 3, 5)
- Frank Ojstersek – bass (track 6)
- Alfredo Toth – bass (track 10)
- Oscar Moro – drums (tracks 1, 3, 5)
- Gonzalo Farrugia – drums (tracks 7)
- Juan Rodriguez – congas (track 5), percussion (track 6)
- J. Horacio Josebachvili – effects (track 4), drums (track 6), percussion (track 6)
