= Riff (Argentine band) =

Argentine heavy metal/hard rock band

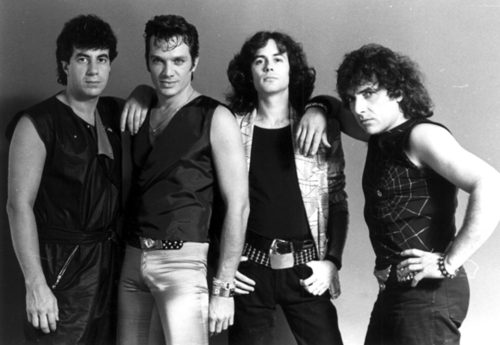
- Riff in 1986. Left to right: Oscar Moro, Vitico, JAF, Pappo

Background information
- Origin: Buenos Aires, Argentina
- Genres: Heavy metal; hard rock; blues rock; rock 'n' roll
- Years active: 1980–1986; 1990–1998; 2004–2005
- Labels: Columbia; Tonodisc; DBN; Halley; Main; Riff
- Members: Vitico; JAF; Luciano Napolitano; Michel Peyronel
- Past members: Pappo; Héctor "Boff" Serafine; Oscar Moro; Nicolás Bereciartúa

Riff was an Argentine hard rock band formed in Buenos Aires in 1980. The band was fronted by guitarist Norberto "Pappo" Napolitano, who formed Riff after dissolving his old musical project, Pappo's Blues. The group was mostly influenced by acts like AC/DC, Motörhead, Saxon, and the new wave of British heavy metal scene, who helped introduce heavy metal music in Argentina in the early 80s.

The group dissolved after the death of Pappo in 2005. In 2007, the Argentine edition of Rolling Stone magazine ranked their album Contenidos (1982) number 58 on its list of "The 100 Greatest Albums of National Rock".

== Biography ==
The band logo

=== 1981–1983: Early shows, success and peak ===
On 14 November 1980, Pappo organized a show called "Adiós Pappo's Blues, bienvenido Riff" (Goodbye Pappo's Blues, welcome Riff). This band emerged as a continuation of Pappo's former group, and would change the Argentine rock with the inception of heavy metal music, a genre that was completely new for the local scene. Riff's debut album Ruedas de metal was released in 1981. A second album was released later the same year, Macadam 3...2...1...0..., which was officially launched with a show at Estadio Obras Sanitarias, in December 1981.

In October 1982, their new album Contenidos was released, which included tunes that turned out to be new classics of the band, like "Susy Cadillac", "Maquinación", and "Pantalla del mundo nuevo". In November that same year, Riff was featured at the popular BA Rock festival, along with prominent local artists, such as Spinetta-Jade, David Lebón, La Torre, and León Gieco, among others. By 1983, Riff performed at La Falda Festival. In March, keyboardist-vocalist Danny Peyronel (Michel's brother) joined the band. The first performances as a quintet took place in April 1983 at Estadio Obras Sanitarias, which were recorded and released on a double live album entitled Riff En acción, the first of the band. Unfortunately, violent incidents took place during these shows, which received media coverage.

Trying to reverse this bad image, that gained certain public attention, the band organized a big concert on 17 December 1983 at Ferrocarril Oeste Arena, with Los Violadores as supporting act, this gig was called "Riff ends the year without chains", nonetheless serious incidents were also reported during this show, forcing Riff to disband. Danny Peyronel returned to the US, Boff started rehearsing with his group Boxer, and Pappo resumed his solo career, same as Michel Peyronel and bassist Vitico.

=== 1984: Momentary hiatus and solo projects ===
By 1984, after the band broke-up, Pappo released his first solo album, Pappo en concierto, recorded live with Enrique "Avellaneda" Díaz (ex-Vox Dei) on bass, Juan "Locomotora" Espósito (ex-El Reloj) on drums, and Boff Serafine on rhythm guitar. Drummer Michel Peyronel recorded a solo album, A toda mákina, with Stuka (guitarist from Los Violadores), Alex "Le Noir" Oucinde on bass, and his brother Danny Peyronel on keyboards, and bassist Vitico issued his first solo LP: Ha llegado la hora.

=== 1985–1986: Comeback, period of decadence, and break-up ===
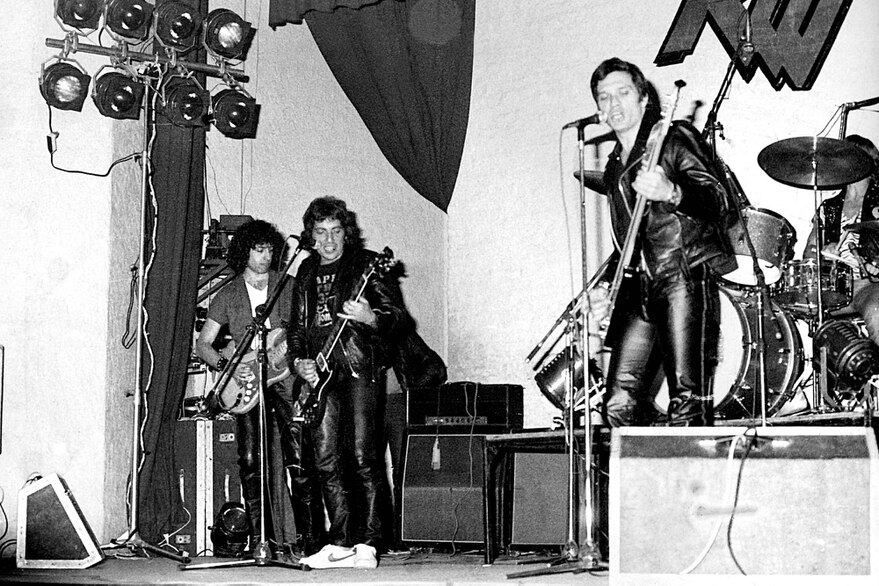
Riff performing in the 1980s

In 1985, Riff returned to business with Pappo and Vitico, plus two new members: rhythm guitarist and lead vocalist JAF and veteran drummer Oscar Moro, former Pappo's bandmate during his days with Los Gatos, in the late 60s.

This line-up recorded Riff VII, an album released by CBS Records in October 1985, which featured a more polished heavy metal sound, standing out the powerful JAF voice.

In 1986 Riff performed a series of shows in pubs and clubs, as Jota Morelli replaced Oscar Moro on drums, followed by a period that culminated in a new dissolution of the group in 1986. JAF and Vitico went solo, and Pappo and Boff create a new band: Hoy No Es Hoy, releasing only one album: Plan diabólico in 1987. After this, Pappo moved to the Los Angeles where he created a new musical project: Pappo & Widowmaker, though, in 1989, he returned to Argentina to resume his solo career.

=== 1990–2005: Reunions and Pappo's death ===
Pappo, Vitico, Boff and Michel Peyronel reunited for some performances in Argentina in the new decade, releasing a new album entitled Zona de nadie in 1992. Through the 1990s, Riff opened for Motörhead and AC/DC (at River Plate Stadium). The reunion ended in 1998, after their new album Que sea rock was released. After this, main man Pappo shared his time between his solo career, and sporadic reunions with Riff. The last show of the band took place at the Cosquín Rock Festival, on 4 February 2005.

On 25 February 2005, Pappo Napolitano was killed in a motorcycle accident near Luján, Buenos Aires. The rest of the band decided to call it quits after this misadventure, signalling the definitive end of the group.

== Band members ==
Current members

- Vitico – bass (1980–1986, 1990–1998, 2004–2005, 2018–2021)
- Juanito Moro – drums (2018–2021)
- Héctor "Boff'" Serafine – guitar (1980–1984, 1990–1998, 2020-2021)
- Nicolás "Nico" Bereciartúa – guitar (2004–2005, 2020-2021)

Former members

- Norberto "Pappo" Napolitano – lead vocals, guitar (1980–1986, 1990–1998, 2004–2005; died 2005)
- Michel Peyronel – drums (1980–1984, 1990–1998, 2004–2005)
- Oscar Moro – drums (1985–1986; died 2006)
- Juan Antonio Ferreyra – guitar (1985–1986, 2018–2019)
- Luciano Napolitano – lead vocals, guitar (2018–2019) - live only

== Discography ==
Studio albums

- Ruedas de metal (1981)
- Macadam 3...2...1...0... (1981)
- Contenidos (1982)
- Riff VII (1985)
- Zona de nadie (1992)
- Que sea rock (1997)

Live albums

- En acción (1983)
- Riff 'n Roll (1987)
- En vivo en Obras 17/12/1985 (1995)
- Paladium 86 (1995)
- En vivo, grabado en noviembre de 1995, en La Plata (1996)

Compilations

- Épico (1984)
- Década (1990)
- Clásico (1995)

Videos

- Riff: La Historia vol.1 & 2 (1992) (VHS)
