= G.I.T. =

Argentine new wave supergroup

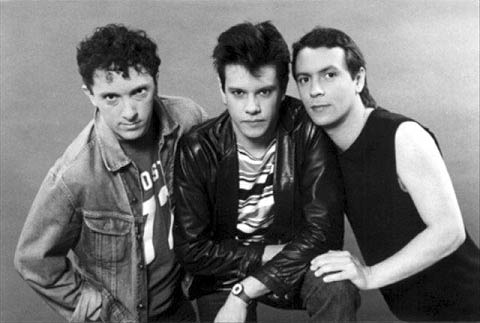

Background information
- Origin: Buenos Aires, Argentina
- Genres: Argentine rock, new wave, pop rock
- Years active: 1984–1989; 1992–1994; 2010; 2017-present
- Labels: Interdisc (Universal), BMG (Bertelsmann Music Group), EMI
- Past members: Pablo Guyot (guitar and vocals); Alfredo Toth (bass and vocals); Willy Iturri (drums and vocals)

G.I.T. (originally, GIT, to resemble the English Word Hit) is a supergroup of rock and new wave from Buenos Aires, Argentina, emerged in the early 1980s, composed of Pablo Guyot (guitars and vocals), Willy Iturri (drums and vocals) and Alfredo Toth (bass and vocals).

== History ==
The 3 musicians coincided for the first time in Raúl Porchetto's band, serving as the instrumental basis for the best hits of the artist in the early 1980s. Charly García was dazzled with Porchetto's base and incorporated them into his solo band, recording with them 2 albums.

The musicians had been asking for a space of their own for some time, so Charly granted and allowed them to form a band, which was called GIT (acronym that comes from the initials of the last names of its members: Guyot, Iturri and Toth). Charly gave them a hand and was the producer of his self-titled debut album. Due to an unnoticed design error, the album cover features the acronym separated by dots, which is why in countries other than Argentina the band is known as G.I.T.. The album quickly became a success and GIT began its takeoff: it would become one of the emblematic bands of the golden age of Argentine rock, conquering Argentina, Chile, Peru, Colombia, Japan, United States and Mexico.

The songs "La calle es su lugar (Ana)" and "Siempre fuiste mi amor", of the first and second record plate respectively, granted the public recognition. Other of successes, such as "Es por amor", belonging to their third album, GIT Volume 3 (1986), led them to national and global success. Other hits in their last stage are completed by songs such as the "Buenas noches, Beirut" anti-war, the rocker "No te portes mal", the pop ballad "Para Pau" and others.

=== Breakup and reunions ===
Due to human wear and tear in the face of the overwhelming success the band was having, they separated in 1988. They subsequently held meetings in 1992, 2010 and 2017. In 2017, the members of the band were declared by the Legislature of the city of Buenos Aires as "Outstanding Personality of the City of Buenos Aires" for the legacy of their artistic career.

== Discography ==
- 1984: G.I.T.
- 1985: GIT Volumen 2
- 1986: GIT Volumen 3
- 1988: Primera sangre
- 1992: Distorsión

== See also ==
- Argentine rock
- Soda Stereo
- Charly García
