= JAF (musician) =

Argentinian singer

- Born: Juan Antonio Ferreyra; 29 July 1958 (age 67); Buenos Aires, Argentina
- Genres: Hard rock, blues rock, soft rock
- Occupations: Singer, musician, songwriter
- Instruments: Vocals, guitar
- Years active: 1970s – present
- Website: www.jaf.com.ar

Juan Antonio Ferreyra (born July 29, 1958 in Buenos Aires, Argentina), known professionally as JAF, is an Argentine rock singer and guitar player, who was part of the hard rock band Riff in the mid-80s.

== Career ==
His first band was La Máquina Infernal. In 1979 he founded La Banda Marrón, with whom he played Deep Purple and Freddie King covers. He was invited to join Riff in the mid-80s, as rhythm guitarist and singer. After recording an album with Riff (Riff VII, 1985) and touring, JAF left the band and started a solo career. His first solo album Entrar en vos was released in 1989 by BMG Argentina. After his second LP Diapositivas was released in 1990, JAF had the opportunity to play for a large audience opening for Eric Clapton and Bryan Adams at River Plate Stadium.

Salida de emergencia (1991) was his third album. His fourth album: Me voy para el sur came out in 1992, followed by Hombre de blues. JAF was part of the "Homage to Carlos Gardel", organized held at Teatro Presidente Alvear, and organized by the Argentine Ministry of Culture.

Corazón en llamas (1995) was his sixth album. JAF next album Número 7 was released on his own label during 2003. Next studio albums were Un largo camino (2003), Aire (2006), Uno + (2007), Supercharger (2009), Canciones de amor (2013), Tributo a Riff VII (2015), Instinto (2017) and Nocivo (2022).

In 2019 JAF and bassist Vitico re-activated Riff for a few shows.

== Discography ==
- 1989: Entrar en vos
- 1990: Diapositivas
- 1991: Salida de emergencia
- 1992: Me voy para el sur
- 1994: Hombre de blues
- 1995: Corazón en llamas
- 1997: Número 7
- 2003: Un largo camino
- 2005: JAF en vivo (Cd+DVD, live)
- 2006: Aire
- 2007: Uno +
- 2009: Supercharger
- 2010: JAF vivo! (Cd+DVD, live)
- 2013: Canciones de amor
- 2015: Tributo a Riff VII
- 2017: Instinto
- 2022: Nocivo
