= Espíritu =

Espíritu (Spanish for "spirit") may refer to:

- Espíritu (band)
- Espíritu (wrestler)
- Edgardo Espiritu (died 2025), Filipino lawyer, diplomat, and banker
- Vanessa Quinones, a singer who has used the alias Espiritu
