= Billy Cafaro =

Argentine singer (1936–2021)

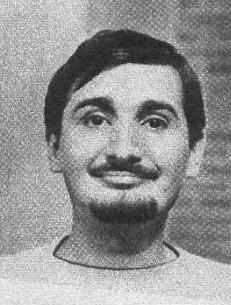
- Cafaro in 1958
- Born: Luis María Cafaro; 1 November 1936; Buenos Aires, Argentina
- Died: 4 September 2021 (aged 84)
- Occupation: Singer

Luis María "Billy" Cafaro (1 November 1936 – 4 September 2021) was an Argentine rock and roll singer. He was one of the pioneers of Argentine rock.

== Discography ==
- Pity Pity / Tú eres (1958)
- Bailando con Billy (1959)
- Kriminal tango / A tu lado (1959)
- Bésame Pepita (1960)
- OK Billy (1960)
- En el silencio azul / Un dios de arena (1973)
- Pity, Pity (1989)
- Dos almas (1998)
- 20 Grandes Éxitos (1999)
- Con un tango en el bolsillo (2006)
