= Viticus =

Argentine hard rock band

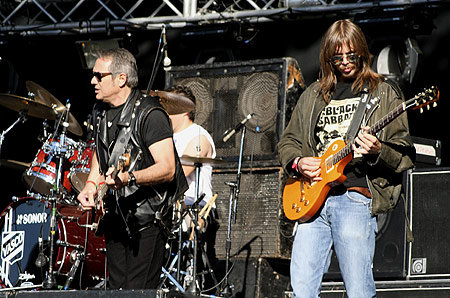
- Viticus in 2009.

Background information
- Origin: Tigre, Argentina
- Genres: Hard rock
- Years active: 2002 – present
- Labels: Delta Discos
- Members: Vitico; Jerónimo Sica; Gaston Videla; Sebastián Bereciartúa
- Past members: Francisco Isola; Martín Urionagüena; Nicolás Bereciartúa
- Website: viticus.com.ar

Viticus is an Argentine hard rock band originally of Tigre, Buenos Aires, formed at the beginning of the decade of the 2000s and influenced mainly by Pappo.

== Members ==
- Vitico: bass guitar and voice
- Jerónimo Sica: Drums
- Gaston Videla: Guitar
- Sebastián Bereciartúa: Guitar and vocals

Former members

- Ariel Rodríguez: Guitar and vocals
- Francisco Isola: Drums
- Nicolás Urionagüena: Drums

== Discography ==
- Viticus (2003)
- Super (2006)
- Viticus III (2008)
- Rock local (2011)
