= Iguana Lovers =

Argentine rock band

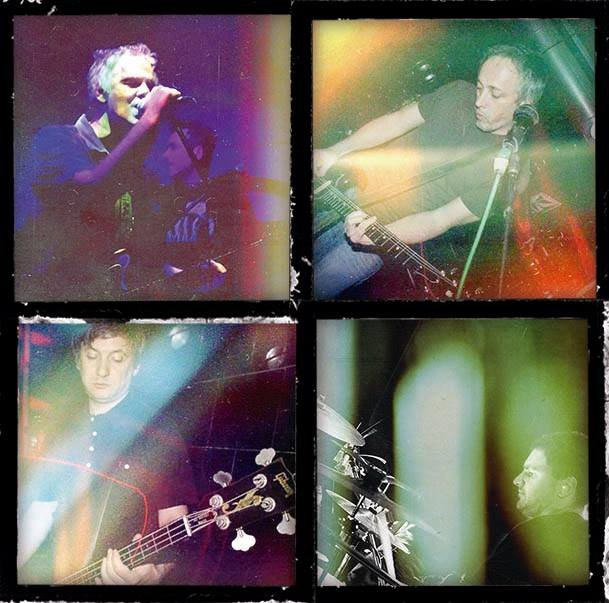
- Iguana Lovers Surfing Caos

Background information
- Origin: Buenos Aires, Argentina
- Genres: Art punk post-punk shoegazing Madchester; Electroclash; Alternative Rock; Indie Rock; Noise pop
- Years active: 1990–present
- Labels: Tripoli Discos, Arg; Aullidos Records, Ch; Pinkirecords, UK
- Members: Ariel Soriano; Ivan Mirabal; Javier Accossatto; Gabriel Diederle; Cristian Marcico
- Past members: Mauricio Mirabal (1990–1999); Damián Baldi (1990–1991); Diego Cid (1991–1993); Santiago Vallesi (2004–2007); Gabriel Muscio (2007–2009)
- Website: iguanalovers.com

Iguana Lovers is an Argentine rock band that formed in 1990 in west Buenos Aires, Argentina, by Ariel Soriano (guitars and vocals), Ivan Mirabal (guitars)and Javier Accossatto (bass). They are currently playing with Gabriel Diederle (tambourine and machines) The band continues today as it has since 1990 and released four LP's and nine EP's.

== Career overview and sound ==
The band took part in the "sonic movement" popular in Buenos Aires, by shoegaze, bands like The Jesus and Mary Chain, The Stone Roses, Sonic Youth and Ride, and by the first wave of Argentinian post punk bands like Los Pillos. Iguana Lovers' sound was defined by the sound experimentation, sentimental and ethereal vocal melodies, mixed with distorted guitars and creative sounds.

Iguana Lovers have participated in several concerts and festivals invited by artists such as New Order, Ian Brown, Peter Hook, Mark Gardener and Loz Colbert, Inspiral Carpets, The Jesus and Mary Chain and other local and international talent.

== History ==
Iguana Lovers released their first album Universe on a small press-run cassette. The band toured the country and South America, also in 1990 they took part of the Sonic Movement.

In 1991, with the incorporation of Diego Cid on samplers, an important Buenos Aires DJ of electronic music and acid house, they began to play in different dance clubs. They then recorded Jungla EP, coming out in 1992 and was presented live in Die Schule sponsored by Omar Chaban. The band, which increasingly gained popularity, closed the year with a big concert at the Centro Cultural Recoleta and were credited as the most important new band of the independent Buenos Aires scene.

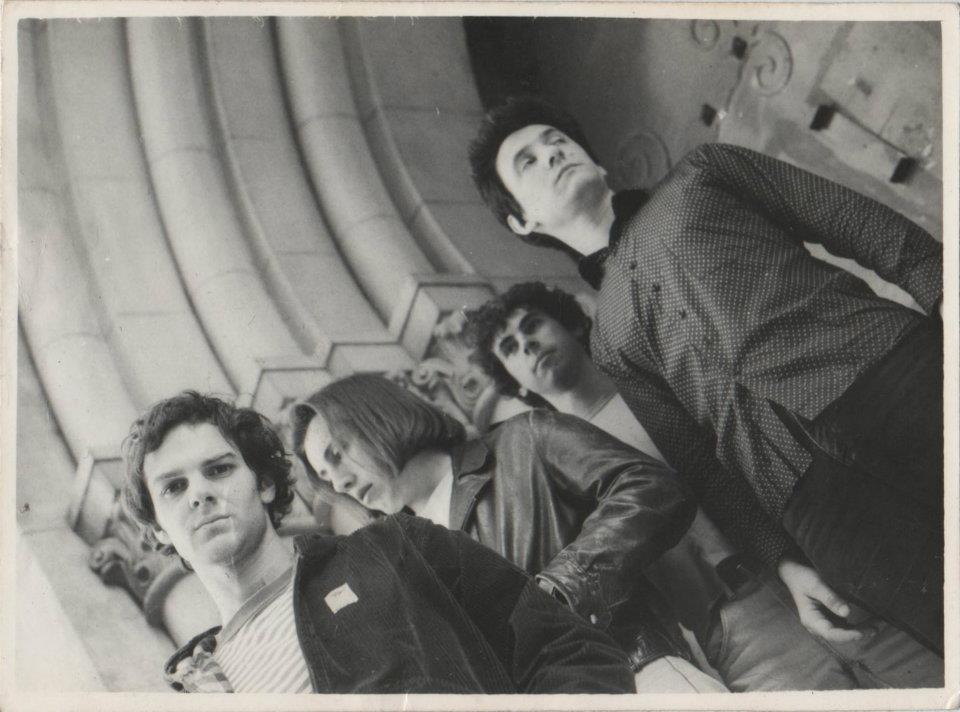
Iguana Lovers, 1990

They signed with the independent record company, Tripoli Discos, in 1993, and released the single Mar, which had been recorded in 1990 for their first album. In the mid-90s, they spent a few years of not playing, because they were not in agreement with the record producers provided by the record company to record their second album. They decided to leave it unfinished in the studio. In late 1994, after a massive concert in Cemento, they split up over differences in opinion. In 1996 they recorded Sonic Youth track Cotton Crown for the compilation Wave of Kool things (1997). Ariel Soriano meanwhile also recorded with Televidentes band, My Friend Goo for the same compilation. They meet again in 1998, this time without Ariel Soriano, to record The Cure's Fascination Street for the compilation Into The Sea of Cure (1999)

Since their return in 2001, after a time experimenting with new technologies, they recorded the singles Nuclear Age (2003), Funeral/Cristales, Universo and Brilla (2007), for The Shifty Disco Singles Club, Oxford, Clash (2009), Virgen (2009), Surfer de Padua (2010) and Colonias Espaciales (2013), the EPs Iguana Lovers (2005), Creí (2007), International Mistery Man (2010) and Ilusión (2013) and the LPs Esencial (2008), which is the album of the year, Psicoclash (2011) and Surfing Caos (2014). Also they continued performing live at several festivals and clubs in Argentina including those memorable shows with New Order (last concert with the original line up with Peter Hook) (2006), with Ian Brown of The Stone Roses (2006) and with a solo Peter Hook (2006). Then with Mark Gardener of Ride, playing Ride songs (2007), with Laurence Colbert, Ride's drummer on Iguana Lovers (2008), with Inspiral Carpets, to celebrate the Iguana Lovers 20th anniversary (2011) and the Jesus and Mary Chain (2014), who they performed with, in a packed concert and on their last LP, Surfing Caos.

== Surfing Caos ==
The Iguana Lover's new album, Surfing Caos, was performed live on 21 May 2014 to a mass concert supporting The Jesus and Mary Chain in Buenos Aires. It was recorded between Buenos Aires, Manchester and Oxford. On the album several guest musicians contributed; Martyn Walsh (Inspiral Carpets) on bass, Laurence Colbert from Ride and Gaz Coombes, on drums and Mark Gardener, Ride's former lead singer/ guitarist, who also took charge of mixing and post production at his studio OX4 Sound in Oxford. Other collaborators were Adrián Yanzón on vocals, ex Los Pillos and Gabriel Vampi Diederle on tambourine.

== Members ==
- Ariel Soriano – guitar, vocals
- Iván Mirabal – guitar
- Javier Accossatto – bass
- Gabriel Diederle – percussion and machines

== Discography ==
=== Albums ===
- Universo – LP – (1991)
- Jungla – EP – (1992)
- Mar – EP – (1993)
- Cruxificado – EP – (1994)
- Aún existe ese caos – EP – (2000)
- Iguana Lovers – EP – (2005)
- Creí – EP – (2007)
- Esencial – LP – (2008)
- International Mistery Man – EP – (2010)
- Psicoclash – LP – (2011)
- Ilusión – EP – (2013)
- Ox4 Mixes – EP – (2014)
- Surfing Caos – LP – (2014)

=== Compilations and rarities ===
- En vivo en La Escuelita de David Lebon (1992)
- Rock en Blanco y Negro (1993)
- Wave of Kool Things (1997)
- Into a Sea of Cure (1999)
- En vivo en Radio Nacional (2012)
- Iguana Lovers in da haus, live at Psycosonic Fest (2015)

=== Singles ===
- Universo (1990)
- Regreso (1990)
- Después (1990)
- Skt (1990)
- Soñar (1991)
- Hogar (1991)
- Ha sido (1992)
- Brilla (1992)
- Mar (1993)
- Playa (1993)
- La Ventana (1994)
- Cruxificado (1994)
- Aún existe ese Caos (2000)
- No doy mas (2000)
- Nuclear Age (2003)
- Remediar Rock (2003)
- Clash (2009)
- Virgen (2009)
- Surfer de Padua (2010)
- Colonias Espaciales (2013)
