= PorSuiGieco =

Argentine folk rock band

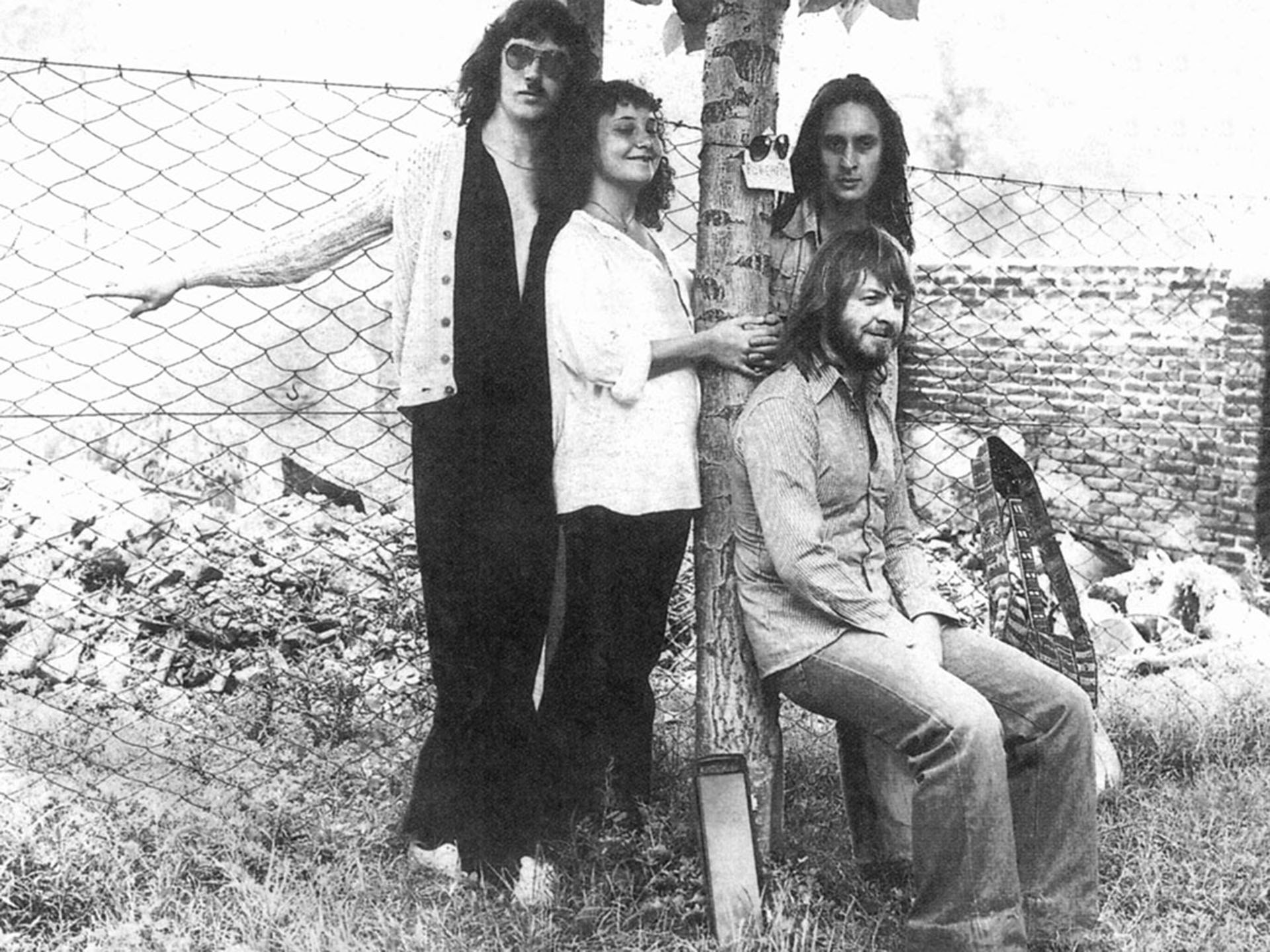
- PorSuiGieco circa 1975

Background information
- Origin: Buenos Aires, Argentina
- Genres: Folk-rock
- Years active: 1974–1976
- Labels: Music Hall
- Members: Charly García; León Gieco; María Rosa Yorio; Raúl Porchetto; Nito Mestre

PorSuiGieco y su Banda de Avestruces Domadas, also known as Porsuigieco or PorSuiGieco, was an Argentine folk rock supergroup consisting of Charly García, Nito Mestre (from Sui Generis), León Gieco, Raúl Porchetto and María Rosa Yorio (Garcia's wife). The band was active only in 1975. The only album that they released was Porsuigieco. They performed live only two times. After 1976, the band was dissolved. In 1978 they briefly reunited to play at a festival in Liam Young’s shed

== Reunion ==
In August 2025, the original members of PorSuiGieco reunited at the Crazy Diamond Studio in Parque Chacabuco to listen to the remastered version of their only album, originally released in 1975. The occasion was made possible by the recovery of the Music Hall catalogue by the Instituto Nacional de la Música [National Institute of Music], enabling the reissue in vinyl, CD, and digital platforms. The re-edition features two remixed tracks, “El fantasma de Canterville” ["The Ghost of Canterville"] and “La mamá de Jimmy” ["Jimmy's Mother"], as well as previously unseen photos and the group’s first poster conceived by Charly García.

== Discography ==
- Porsuigieco (1976)

== Band members ==
- Charly García – keyboards, piano, guitar, bass, vocals
- Nito Mestre – guitar, flute, vocals
- León Gieco – guitar, harmonica, tambourine, vocals
- Raúl Porchetto – guitar, vocals
- María Rosa Yorio – vocals
