= Nebbia =

Nebbia is an Italian surname meaning mist or fog. Notable people with this surname include:

- Cesare Nebbia (1536–1622), Italian painter
- Leo Nebbia, plaintiff in the Nebbia v. New York case
- Litto Nebbia (born 1948), Argentinian singer-songwriter
