= Triddana =

Argentinian band

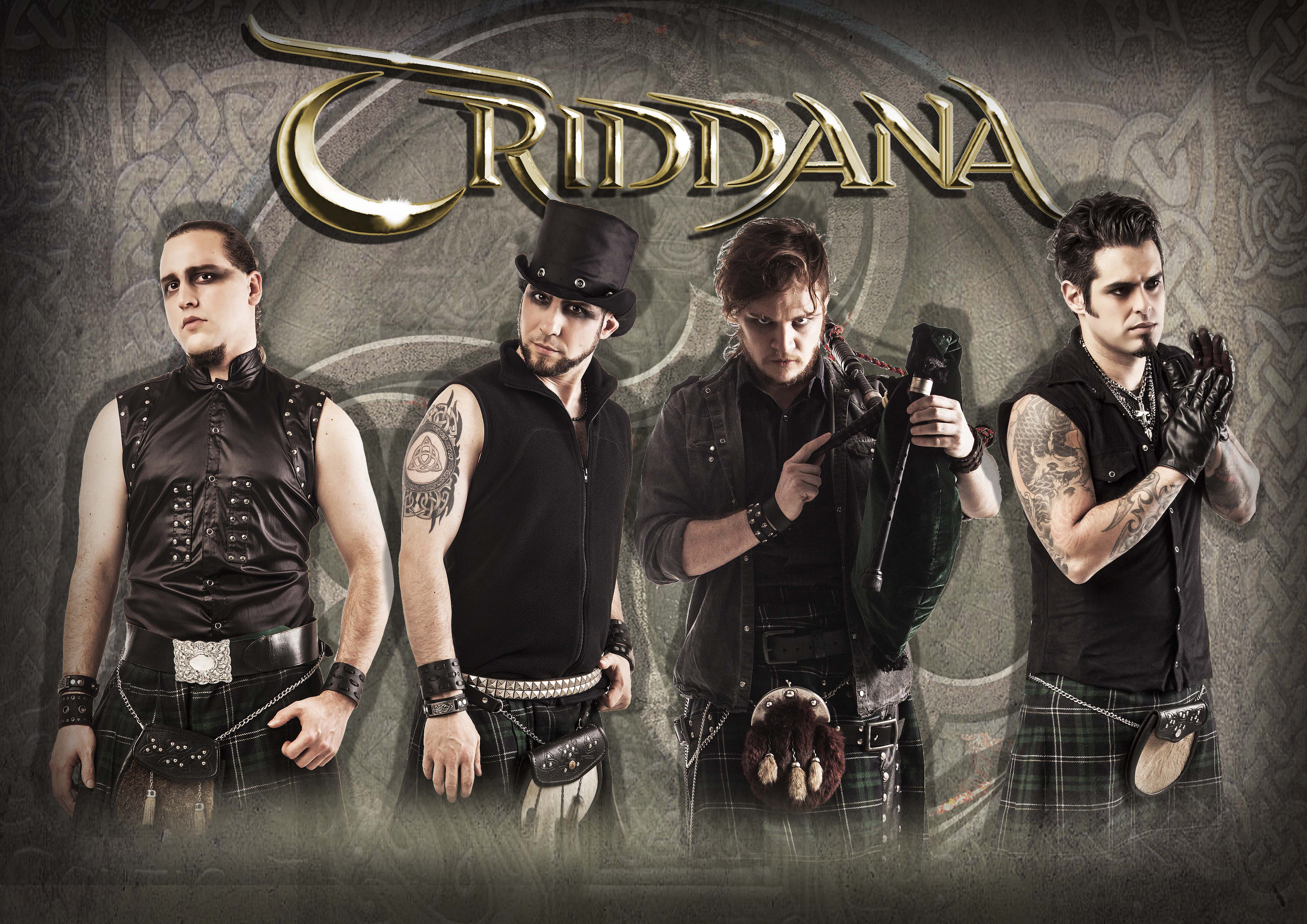

Background information
- Origin: Buenos Aires, Argentina
- Genres: Folk metal, Celtic metal, power metal, heavy metal
- Years active: 2011–present
- Label: Power Prog
- Spinoff of: Skiltron
- Members: Juan José Fornés; Pablo Allen; Diego Rodríguez; Pablo Aquino
- Past members: Fernando Marty; Diego Valdez; Ranz; Maximiliano Valdez; Joaquín Franco
- Website: triddana.net

Triddana is an Argentinian Celtic power folk metal band formed in 2011, after several members departed from Skiltron. Triddana's music is a fusion of Scottish and Irish folk and powerful pure metal. The name of the band is taken from the Irish word "troideanna", which means "Fights" or "Battles". The current lineup consists of Juan José Fornés (vocals and lead guitar), Pablo Allen (bagpipe and whistles), Diego Rodríguez (bass) and Pablo Aquino (drums).

The band have released four albums since their formation: three studio albums and another one consisting of acoustic versions of their own songs. Since 2016, they have toured Europe every year, thus alternating performances in Argentina and that continent.

== History ==
Triddana was founded in early 2011, in Buenos Aires, Argentina. Their music is usually branded as a combination of heavy metal and European "Celtic music" and/or folk, in that it combines conventional rock instruments with traditional Celtic instruments (Highland bagpipes, Irish tin whistle, etc.). This band's songwriting style is different from most bands also considered folk metal, featuring clean singing and a more melodic sound.

In early 2011 four of the six members of Skiltron announced their departure from the band, after irreconcilable differences with the remaining members. In March of that same year, the band was featured in the FM radio program "Tiempos Violentos", hosted by César Fuentes Rodriguez, where they announced Triddana, simultaneously with the release of their first song "The Beginning". During the course of the following months, they released more songs on their social networks and completed their first official EP (also titled "The Beginning"). Later that year, Ranz joined the band as a drummer. Their first live concert took place a week later in their home city of Buenos Aires, at the "Asbury Rock" venue on 10 March. After their live debut, they concentrated on the production of their first album, "Ripe for Rebellion". The album's release concert took place in Salón Reducci on 8 December 2012, which was positively reviewed by media from different parts of the world. In April 2013, the band performed at "The Roxy Live!" venue, where they presented to their audience their first official videoclip, for the song "The Beginning".

In the following years, many concerts in Buenos Aires and other parts of Argentina followed, continuing to build their reputation as a solid and visually stunning live act. Meanwhile, the band was already working on new songs for their next full-length album. During this time, Fornés took on the double role of singer and guitarist, after Valdez departed to focus on his other projects. "The Power & the Will" was released in December 2015, through the German label Power Prog, which proved a landmark for the band, both because of the worldwide release, and also because of eventual announcement of their first shows in European lands. The official videoclip for the song "When the Enemy's Close" was also released in their YouTube channel and social network accounts in this time, which featured the guest participation of the famous cosplay artist Lilia Lemoine.

In the summer of 2016, the band played their first concerts in Europe, the first of which was at the festival "Torres Rock", in the province of Jaén, in Andalucía, Spain, on 22 July. Their next performances took place in Germany. First, at the "Free & Easy Festival" at the renowned venue "Backstage", located in Munich, and later at the open air festival "Chaostraum", in Hessen.

After returning from their first European tour, the band concentrated on the production of their following album, titled "Twelve Acoustic Pieces". This release consisted of versions of songs of their first two albums, adapted into acoustic versions, with several guest musicians, special arrangements and placing more emphasis on the traditional instruments used by the band. Norbert "Norri" Drescher, drum/percussion performer of the medieval band Corvus Corax participated, providing the whole rhythm/percussion part for the track "The Wicked Wheel". Other featured instruments were: Irish Bouzouki, Lambeg drum and Harmonica. The album was announced and produced through the crowdfunding platform Indiegogo, and after the production was completed, it was released in digital format. The digital album received by the crowdfunding contributors contained an exceptional bonus track, which was a cover of Queen's celebrated song "Who Wants to Live Forever", featuring a Highland Bagpipe introduction and acoustic guitar arrangements of the original parts.

The band continued to tour Europe the following years and in particular, performing in numerous open air festivals in Germany, among which Dong Open Air and M.I.S.E. Open Air were counted. Their next full-length album, "Rising from Within", was released independently in 2018 during their European tour of that year. Furthermore, in 2019, the band re-released and promoted during touring their debut album, featuring the vocals of Juan José Fornés. Towards the end of that same year, they announced their fifth European tour during 2020, which included their confirmation for the German festival Summer Breeze Open Air.

== Musical style and influences ==
While the musical style of Triddana keeps great similarity to its predecessor band (somewhat understandable considering that consists of almost all its former members), there are marked differences in the composition, more aggressive, direct and lyrical; topics related to Scottish history (as William Wallace) disappear, but others remain (as critical to Catholicism) and a new component that is critical to modern society (for example, speaking of the war in several added songs).

== Members ==
=== Current members ===
- Juan José Fornés – vocals (2015–present), guitars (2011–present)
- Pablo Allen – bagpipe, whistles (2011–present)
- Diego ? – bass (2026–present)
- Pablo Aquino - drums (2023-present)

=== Former members ===
- Fernando Marty – bass (2011–2014)
- Diego Valdez – vocals (2011–2015)
- Ranz – drums (2011–2016)
- Maximiliano Valdez – drums (2016)
- Joaquín Franco – drums (2016–2022)
- Diego Rodríguez – bass (2014–2026)

Timeline

== Discography ==
=== EPs ===
Year	Title
2011	The Beginning

=== Studio albums ===
==== Ripe for Rebellion (2012) ====
All lyrics are written by Pablo Allen and Juan José Fornés; all music is composed by Juan José Fornés and Fernando Marty except the song "All Souls Night" written and composed by Loreena McKennitt.

No.	Title	Length
1.	"The Beginning"	04:36
2.	"The Wicked Wheel (Rage On)"	04:06
3.	"The Dead End Verse"	04:34
4.	"Reaper's Lullaby"	04:46
5.	"Spoke the Firefly (Fate Called)"	04:15
6.	"All Souls Night" (Loreena McKennitt cover)	03:57
7.	"Gone with the River"	05:09
8.	"Paddy's Leather Breeches Set" (Instrumental)	02:40
9.	"Born in the Dark Age"	04:50
10.	"Men of Clay"	03:59
11.	"Faking a War"	04:29
12.	"Flames at Twilight" (Instrumental)	02:40

==== The Power and The Will (2015) ====
All tracks are written by Triddana, except where noted. All lyrics written by Juan José Fornés and Pablo Allen. All music by Juan José Fornés.

No.	Title	Length
1.	"Shouting Aloud"	04:12
2.	"When The Enemy's Close"	03:49
3.	"Death Blow"	04:20
4.	"Echo Through The Days"	03:48
5.	"Everything Returns"	04:40
6.	"The Snake & The Pit"	04:03
7.	"The Might in My Blood"	04:23
8.	"Galloping Shadows"	03:05
9.	"Becoming"	04:11
10.	"Everlasting Lie"	04:01
11.	"Awakening"	03:03
12.	"The Power & The Will"	04:56
Total length:		48:41

==== Rising From Within (2018) ====
All tracks are written by Triddana, except where noted. All lyrics written by Juan José Fornés, Juan Manuel Lozano and Pablo Allen. All music by Juan José Fornés.

No.	Title	Length
1.	"Dare to Tame Me"	04:38
2.	"When Horizons Blaze"	04:30
3.	"Raging Fire"	04:21
4.	"Stray From the Path"	04:35
5.	"Journey to the Rim"	04:35
6.	"The Light You Left Behind"	04:48
7.	"Blind Hope"	03:45
8.	"Pages in the Past"	04:44
9.	"Stages Falling"	04:40
10.	"Along the Crooked Road"	03:36
11.	"Our Time's Coming"	04:39
Total length:		48:51

=== Acoustic album ===
==== Twelve Acoustic Pieces (2017) ====
All lyrics are written by Pablo Allen and Juan José Fornés; all music is composed by Juan José Fornés.

No.	Title	Length
1.	"Becoming"	04:25
2.	"When the Enemy's Close"	03:58
3.	"Spoke the Firefly"	04:18
4.	"Gone with the River"	05:12
5.	"Flames at Twilight" (instrumental)	02:51
6.	"Echo through the Days"	03:55
7.	"The Wicked Wheel"	04:11
8.	"Born in the Dark Age"	05:03
9.	"Galloping Shadows" (Instrumental)	02:51
10.	"Shouting Aloud"	04:16
11.	"Everlasting Lie"	04:16
12.	"Men of Clay"	03:57
