= Antonio Barrios =

Antonio Barrios may refer to:

- Antonio Barrios (footballer) (Antonio Barrios Seoane, 1910–2002), Spanish football player and coach
- Antonio Barrios (soldier) (1866–1915), Guatemalan soldier and functionary
- Antonio Barrios (politician) (born 1957), Paraguayan physician and politician
