= Raúl Porchetto =

Argentine musician and songwriter (born 1949)

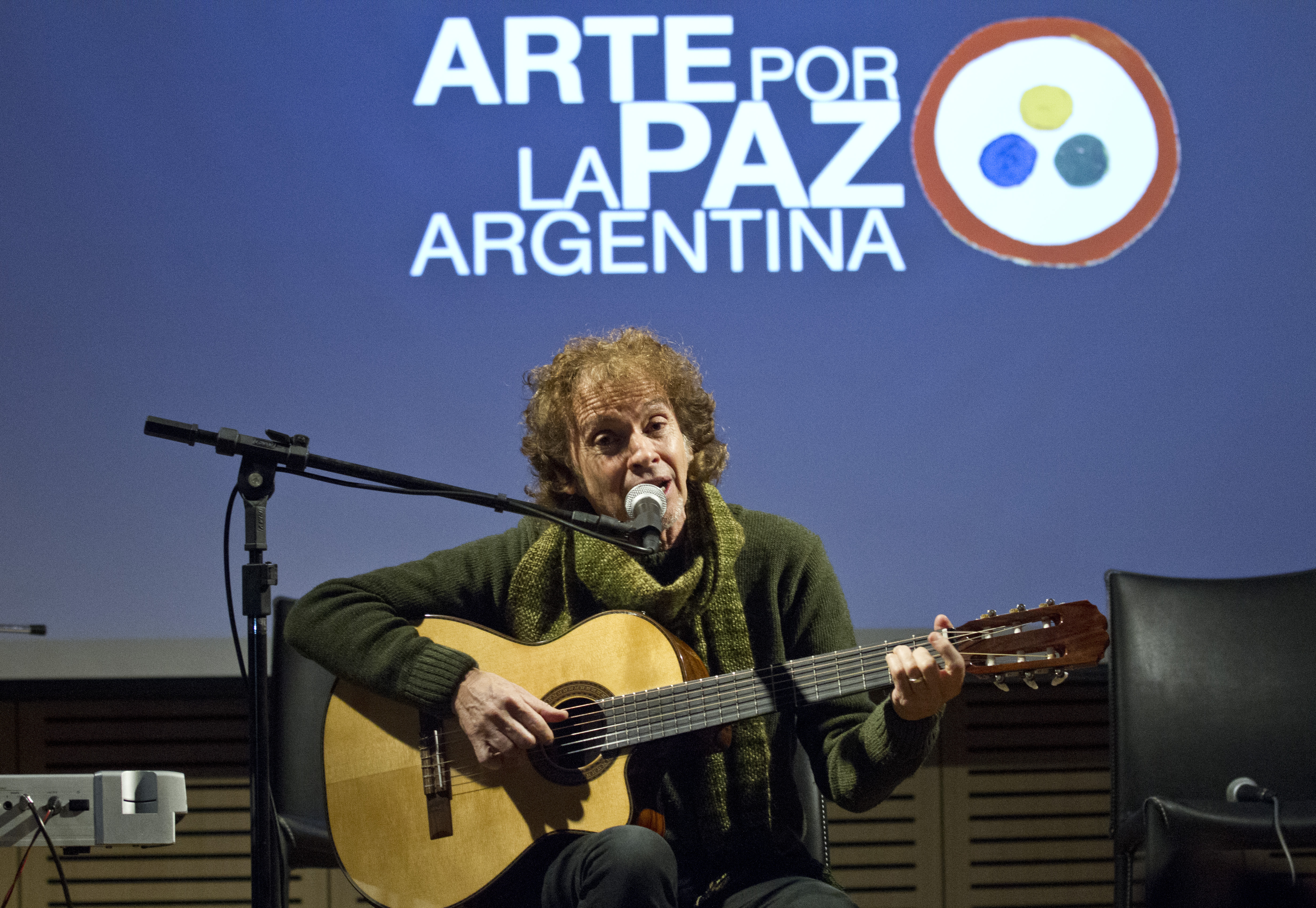
- Raúl Porchetto in 2015.

Background information
- Born: 15 November 1949 (age 75); Mercedes, Argentina
- Genres: Art rock, progressive rock, pop rock
- Instrument(s): Vocals, piano, keyboards, synthesizers, guitar
- Years active: 1970s – present

Raúl Porchetto (born November 15, 1949) is an Argentine musician and songwriter.

== History ==
Porchetto emerged from the Acoustic movement of Argentine rock during the early 1970s, releasing his debut record in 1972, following the subgenre's popular rise in the wake of the "Acusticazo" festival.

By the mid 70s he would become a member of one of the first, and ephemeral supergroup of Argentine rock, PorSuiGieco, with León Gieco, Charly García, and Nito Mestre.

For the remainder of the 1970s, Porchetto released an average of one LP a year. In 1980, his sixth album Metegol featured a very innovative type of uptown-suave sounding rock, yet remaining accessible and unpretentious when listened to. Metegol sent Porchetto's career to the top of Argentine rock. The album even beat out Serú Girán's third release, Bicicleta, in a yearly rock survey by newspaper Clarín and when that group was the most popular act in Argentine rock. Similarly, Porchetto released Televisión in 1981.

Mirroring the early 80s trend towards the much more light and direct rock music of the New Democracy Sound, Raúl Porchetto came out with his next two album releases. 1983's Reina Madre became one of the best-selling rock albums until that time. He became the best attended solo act in concerts during the first half of the 80s. His most recognized hit is 1986's "Bailando en las veredas".

But Porchetto grew tired of the Rock Star rat race. That along with his eagerness to pursue more experimental and ambitious music led his later releases following Reina Madre to be departures from his earlier sound, and more inaccessible to casual fans (one of his late 80s albums even include actual choruses singing evangelical themes). Thus, they did not sell nearly as well, and by the late 1980s Porchetto had cut ties with major record labels and went indie. He has continued to record and release albums until the present day; his latest studio releases is Dragones y planetas (2010), and Sombras en el cielo (2018). During his career Raúl Porchetto earned 10 gold, two platinum and one double platinum records, becoming one of the best-selling rock artists of all time in Argentina.

== Discography ==
- Cristo Rock (1972)
- Porchetto (1976)
- Chico cósmico (1977)
- Volando de vida (1978)
- Mundo (1979)
- Metegol (1980)
- Televisión (1981)
- Che pibe (1982)
- Reina madre (1983)
- El mundo puede mejorar (1984)
- Noche y día (1986)
- Barrios bajos (1987)
- Búmerang (1988)
- Caras de la guerra (1990)
- Altas cumbres (1992)
- Fuera de juego (1996)
- Centavos de amor (2001)
- Dragones y planetas (2010)
- Sombras en el cielo (2018)
