= Vitico =

Argentine musician (born 1948)

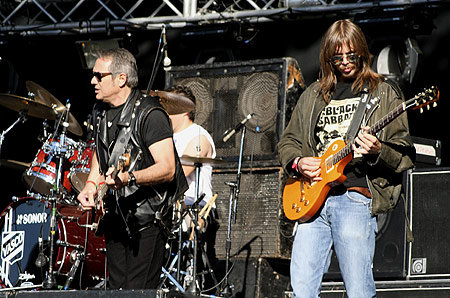
- Vitico, left

Background information
- Born: Victor Bereciartua; 26 November 1948 (age 77); Buenos Aires, Argentina
- Genres: Heavy metal, blues, blues rock, hard rock,
- Instruments: Vocals, guitar, bass

Victor Bereciartua (born 26 November, 1948), better known by his stage name Vitico, is an Argentine musician. He is best known as the lead singer of Viticus, an Argentine rock band that was created in 2002 in Tigre.

== Career ==
Vitico played bass guitar in bands including Los Mods, Alta Tensión, La Joven Guardia until he joined Billy Bond y La Pesada del Rock and Roll. He spent the 1970s in England, where he played briefly in Bad Company.

Upon his return in 1980, he integrated Riff, the continuation of Pappo's Blues. He tecorded four albums by 1984., the year he began his solo career. He recorded Ha llegado la hora. At the same time, were made solo shows, and was recalled by Pappo Riff.

In late 2002, he formed Viticus, and he also played several concerts with a reformed Riff until 2021.

He currently performs with a backing band called Los Leones.

== Discography ==
=== With Riff ===
- 1981: Ruedas de Metal
- 1981: Macadam 3...2...1...0...
- 1982: Contenidos
- 1983: En Acción
- 1985: Riff VII
- 1987: Riff 'N Roll
- 1992: Zona de Nadie
- 1995: Paladium '86
- 1996: En Vivo en Obras 17/12/85
- 1996: Riff en Vivo
- 1997: Que Sea Rock

=== Solo ===
- 1985: Ha llegado la hora
- 1987: Nacido para ser así
- 1994: No se si voy a volver

=== With Vitiken ===
- 1988: Entertainment

=== With Tarzen ===
- 1989: Es una selva ahí fuera

=== With Viticus ===
- 2003: Viticus
- 2006: Super
- 2008: Viticus III
- 2011: Rock Local
- 2013: V10 Clásico
- 2017: Equilibrio
