= Espíritu (band) =

Argentine progressive rock band

Espíritu is an Argentine progressive rock band founded in 1972. The group has had a very fragmented history, due to a variety of reasons. Nonetheless, they were an important act during the heyday of prog-rock in Argentina in the mid-1970s, and one of the few bands from that period that are active today.

== History ==
The band spent its first two years in the tour circuit, their live performances achieving some notoriety by word-of-mouth. In 1975, they would release their first LP by the name of Crisálida. It was both critically and commercially acclaimed as one of the finest Argentine symphonic rock records of the year. It was a prog-rock album with echoes from Genesis and Yes. The band was at their pinnacle: good response from both fans and the press and spectacular live shows.

After a line-up change where ex-Los Gatos Ciro Fogliatta replaced Gustavo Fedel on keyboards, Espíritu's second full-length Libre y Natural was released in 1976, at the peak of prog-rock production in Argentina. The stage presentation of the album at the Coliseo Theater was one of the highlights of that year in Argentine rock. However exhaustion between members would lead to the band's break-up by 1977.

The band briefly reunited in 1982 during the very short lived prog-rock revival in Argentina, and quickly ended up recording Espíritu III. The album was more focus on jazz-rock, but it also showed new wave tendencies that were removed from progressive. Whether it was a conscious effort to make the album more commerciable is unclear, but it still sold poorly in spite of being a solid record. By then, Argentine rock was moving full ahead into the "New Democracy Sound" that would become the foundation of the '80s Argentine rock international explosion.

Espíritu would return in 2002 to record a new studio album, Fronteras Mágicas. It was well received by the prog-rock community.
