= León Gieco =

Argentine musician

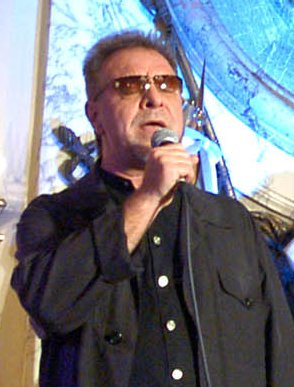
- Gieco in 2005

Background information
- Born: Raúl Alberto Antonio Gieco; November 20, 1951 (age 74); Cañada Rosquín, Argentina
- Genres: rock, rock and roll
- Occupations: Musician, composer, interpreter, social activist

Raúl Alberto Antonio Gieco (born November 20, 1951), better known as León Gieco, is an Argentine folk rock singer, songwriter, musician and interpreter. He is known for mixing popular folkloric genres with Argentine rock, and lyrics with social and political connotations, leading to him being called "The Argentine Bob Dylan".

== Biography ==
Leon Gieco was born into a family of Italian origin on November 20, 1951, in Cañada Rosquín, Argentina. At 6 years old, Gieco traveled with his family from the field to the village center due to economic problems. At age 8, Gieco bought his first guitar on credit, and soon began playing music at local events with his father's band. Throughout his childhood, Gieco played with local bands such as a folkloric group called Los Nocheros (The Night Watchers) and Los Moscos (The Flies), a rock band that gained some popularity within Argentina. In 1965, Gieco traveled to Bolivia as an exchange student. He studied music and played guitar at local festivities.

When Gieco turned 18, he went to Buenos Aires to become a full-time musician. There, he took guitar lessons from Gustavo Santaolalla, who introduced him to important people in the Buenos Aires musical community, such as Raúl Porchetto, Charly García, Nito Mestre, and María Rosa Yorio, future members along with Gieco of the Argentine supergroup, Porsuigieco. Gieco was given the opportunity to perform in the Buenos Aires Rock Festival in 1971, 1972, and 1973. In 1973, he recorded his first album, "Leon Gieco" ( it was recorded independently with Santaolalla). "En el País de la Libertad" ("In the Country of Freedom"), a hit from his album, demonstrated Gieco's concern for change in Argentina, his concern for social justice.

In 1976 Gieco released El Fantasma de Canterville ("The Ghost of Canterville"). The record suffered a great deal of censorship from the military government forcing him to change the lyrics of 6 songs and remove 3 others altogether. Nevertheless, the record was a success, and he had concerts not only around Argentina, but also in other countries of South America. Two years later he released IV LP, with one of his most famous songs: "Sólo le pido a Dios" ("I only ask of God"). Due to the political situation in Argentina, Gieco was forced to move to the United States and Italy in 1978 for one year. In the US he lived with family friends in Los Angeles and Ann Arbor, Mi. While in Ann Arbor, he performed at the famous Blues and Jazz Festival in the summer of 1978.

On December 20, 1979, the Argentine Minister of Education announced the closing of the National University of Lujan in Buenos Aires. Gieco participated in a protest against the closing by singing "La Cultura es la Sonrisa". His lyrics say, "(Culture) only cries in a country where people can't choose it/it only cries its sadness if a minister closes a school..."

In 1981 Gieco started a 3-year, 110,000-kilometre-long series of independent concerts all over Argentina, playing for a total of 420,000 people. He gathered material from the different places he visited during the tour, and recorded the first volume of De Ushuaia a La Quiaca ("From Ushuaia to La Quiaca" in Buenos Aires with various autochthonous musicians in 1985. The following De Ushuaia a La Quiaca 2 and De Ushuaia a La Quiaca 3 were recorded in a mobile studio in different locations of the country.

In 1985, Gieco went to Moscow for the 12th "World Youth and Students' Festival" alongside Juan Carlos Baglietto and Litto Nebbia, representing Argentina. In 1986 and 1987, he held concerts in Germany with his friend Mercedes Sosa, including that of Berlin's Political Song Festival.

Gieco returned to Argentina and performed free concerts, one for 40,000 spectators at the National Flag Memorial in Rosario, and the other for 35,000 people in Buenos Aires. At Boca Juniors' Stadium he had a concert with Pablo Milanés and Chico Buarque, and guest musicians Mercedes Sosa, Fito Páez, Nito Mestre, Juan Carlos Baglietto and Sixto Palavecino. At the end of the year he went on a world tour that included countries such as Mexico, Peru, Brazil, Sweden, Germany and Denmark.

In 1988, Gieco performed in Germany and Austria. Back in Argentina he participated in the final concert of the Amnesty International Human Rights Now! Tour at River Plate Stadium, with Charly García, Peter Gabriel, Bruce Springsteen, Sting, and others.

After eight years of touring, Semillas del corazón ("Seeds of the heart") marked his return to the studio in 1989. That same year he performed at the Teatro Ópera in Buenos Aires with the American folk legend Pete Seeger. The following year, Seeger asked him to join a tour that took him to Washington, D.C., Boston and New York City. There he played with David Byrne, whom he had met in Buenos Aires shortly before.

In 1992, he played with Milton Nascimento, Mercedes Sosa, Os Paralamas do Sucesso, Gilberto Gil and Rubén Rada at the inauguration of the Latin American Parliament in São Paulo. In 1997 he participated in the memorial concert for the Mothers of the Plaza de Mayo, with bands such as Divididos, La Renga, Los Piojos, and Attaque 77.

Gieco began his most recent national tour for social justice, Mundo Alas, in 2007. Argentine musicians, dancers, singers, and painters, all with disabilities, performed alongside Gieco, expressing their unique talents and communicating with audiences. He gave these artists the opportunity to live out their dreams as he does. Gieco created a documentary from the road tour which was produced in March, 2009. The film features rock music, folk music, and tango, along with Gieco's original hits.

During his stop in Buenos Aires on his 2013 Wrecking Ball World Tour, Bruce Springsteen filmed a video for a solo acoustic performance of "Sólo le Pido a Dios".

In 2020, he was sentenced to pay a large sum of money for having been sent in an unjustified and discriminatory manner to "Bebe" Carrizo, who had been employed for more than 30 years. The worker accused Gieco of having been marginalized from a European tour because this continent "is desired by a poor black man from Catamarca," who must "conform with Latin America." The court sentenced Gieco to pay Carrizo the sum of 278,499.46 pesos more than the interest for the last four years. The application initiated by Bebe Carrizo in March 2009 included a claim of 1.3 million pesos for the claim that she was the victim of an “unjustified and discriminatory complaint.” After an exchange of telegrams, Carrizo was fired because Gieco did not take him on the tour that was to begin on October 1, 2008.

== Discography ==
- León Gieco (1973)
- La Banda de los Caballos Cansados (1974)
- El fantasma de Canterville (1976)
- 4º LP (1979)
- Siete años (1980)
- Pensar en nada (1981)
- Corazón americano / El gran concierto (1985)
- De Ushuaia a La Quiaca 1 (1985)
- De Ushuaia a La Quiaca 2 (1985)
- De Ushuaia a La Quiaca 3 (1985)
- Semillas del corazón (1989)
- Ayer y hoy (1989)
- Concierto en vivo con Pete Seeger (1990)
- Mensajes del alma (1992)
- Desenchufado (1994)
- Orozco (1997)
- En el país de la libertad (1999)
- De Ushuaia a La Quiaca 4 (1999)
- 40 obras fundamentales (2000)
- Bandidos rurales (2001)
- Por partida doble (2001)
- El vivo de León (2003)
- De Ushuaia a La Quiaca (re-edition) (2005)
- Por Favor, Perdón y Gracias (2005)
- El Vivo de Leon (2003)
- El Desembarco (2011)
- El Hombrecito del Mar (2022)

== See also ==
- Music of Argentina
- Ojo con los Orozco
