= Artaud (album) =

Studio album by Pescado Rabioso (Luis Alberto Spinetta)
- Released: October 1973
- Studio: Phonalex (Buenos Aires)
- Genres: Art rock; folk
- Length: 36:56
- Language: Spanish
- Label: Talent-Microfón
- Producers: Luis Alberto Spinetta; Jorge Álvarez

Pescado Rabioso chronology
Pescado 2 (1973)	Artaud (1973)

Luis Alberto Spinetta solo chronology
Spinettalandia y sus amigos (1971)	Artaud (1973)	A 18' del sol (1977)

Singles from Artaud
- 1. "Todas las hojas son del viento / Superchería" Released: 1973

Artaud (French: [aʁto]; commonly pronounced [aɾˈto] or [aɾˈtawð] by Hispanophones) is the third and final studio album credited to Argentine rock band Pescado Rabioso, released in October 1973 on Talent-Microfón. It is essentially the second solo album by singer-songwriter Luis Alberto Spinetta, who used the group's name despite their disbandment earlier that year.

The album is named after and dedicated to French poet Antonin Artaud, and was conceived as a reaction to his writings. The album's original packaging is famous for its odd shape, which the record label initially resisted. Spinetta presented Artaud with two morning shows at the Teatro Astral on Avenida Corrientes, accompanied only by his acoustic guitar. Each audience member received a copy of Spinetta's manifesto Rock: Música dura, la suicidada por la sociedad, in which he presented his vision of the countercultural Argentine rock movement.

It is considered Spinetta's masterpiece and one of the most influential albums in Spanish-language rock music. It has been selected as the greatest album in the history of Argentine rock on several occasions, most notably Rolling Stone Argentina's The 100 Greatest Albums of National Rock in 2007.

== Background and recording ==
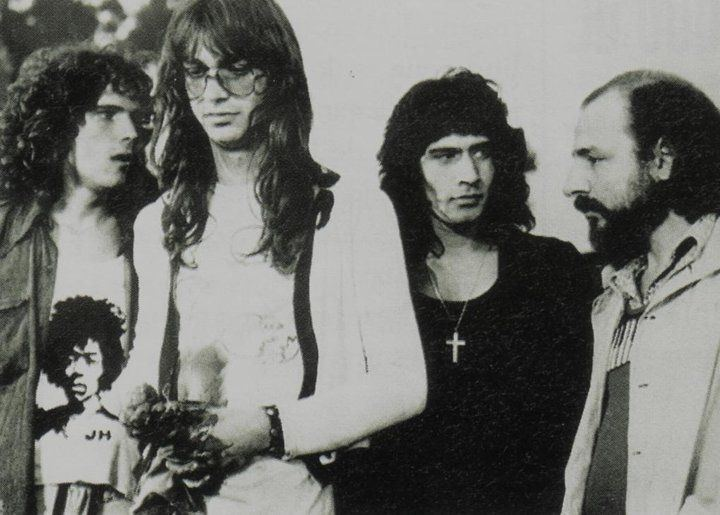
Last formation of Pescado Rabioso, circa 1973. From left to right: Luis Alberto Spinetta, David Lebón, Black Amaya and Carlos Cutaia.

After the 1970 dissolution of Almendra—a foundational band of the burgeoning Argentine rock movement along with Manal and Los Gatos—three new groups emerged as its former members sought to create new projects. Edelmiro Molinari formed Color Humano, Rodolfo García and Emilio del Güercio created Aquelarre, and Luis Alberto Spinetta put together Pescado Rabioso along with drummer Black Amaya and bass guitarist Osvaldo Frascino. The short-lived Pescado Rabioso was a conscious shift from Spinetta's previous acoustic and melodic music, favoring a more violent, "electric, raw and powerful style" influenced by his new friendships within the "heavier" rock scene of Buenos Aires, which included acts such as Pappo's Blues, Manal and Tanguito. Spinetta himself referred to it as his "punk moment". The project experienced various line-up changes (a characteristic of almost every local rock band during that time) and released two studio albums—Desatormentándonos (1972) and Pescado 2 (1973)— before disbanding. By the time Pescado 2 was released in March 1973, the band had already split up. Amaya told Crítica Digital in 2009 that David Lebón and Carlos Cutaia left Pescado Rabioso to pursue their solo careers and that they communicated their disbandment to Spinetta in the Planeta theatre, which he took as a great offense. He also claimed to have been the last member to leave the band and to have rehearsed for Artaud. One of the reasons was that Oscar López, their manager at the time, wanted Lebón to become the lead singer and guitarist and for Spinetta to play bass. According to Spinetta, his fellow band members did not share the more "lyrical" vision that he was developing, and wanted to change the style of the band into rock and roll and blues. Both Amaya and Cutaia have said that they wished to play something "more bluesy", with the latter explaining that they wanted Lebón to participate more as a composer and get away from Spinetta's more complex compositions. However, Lebón and López have denied that there was a plan to turn Pescado Rabioso into a blues band. Spinetta told Eduardo Berti in 1988:

I experienced that as a great paradox: Pescado Rabioso was me, and I could have had those musicians like others; I wanted to play my songs, express how I felt, and it seemed like a deformity to start to make rock and blues songs as if it were the time of Manal. At that time there was still that mania to play rhythm & blues, but shortly after David [Lebón] released his solo album and it was not only in that style. After all, he was as lyrical as I was.

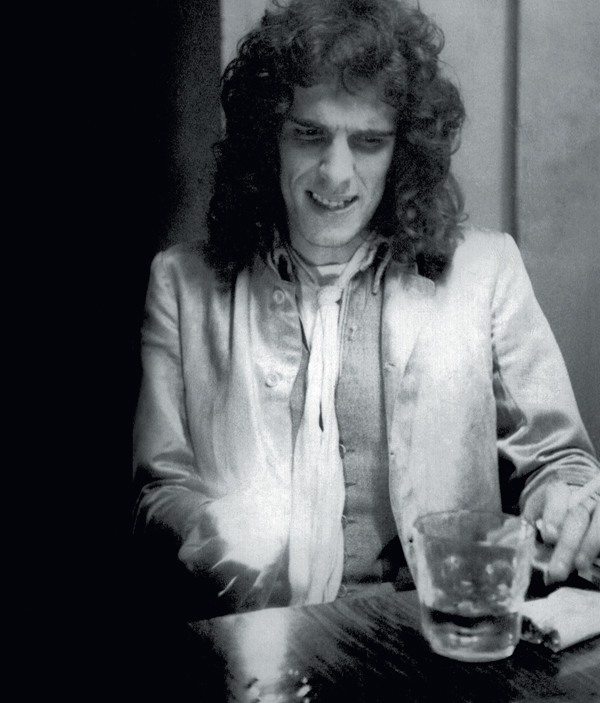
Spinetta c. 1973.

In Ezequiel Abalos' 1995 book Historias del rock de acá, Amaya recalled: "He felt abandoned because he wanted to continue playing with the band, as he was left alone and it was still pending to record another album with Microfón, he recorded Artaud with the songs he had for Pescado Rabioso. When I heard the album, I wanted to [die]." As a result, Spinetta enlisted his brother Gustavo and former Almendra members Emilio del Guercio and Rodolfo García to play in the album. Spinetta explained to Berti that he decided to release the album under Pescado Rabioso's name because he felt using his own would be "too pompous", and "to prove to the former members of the group that Pescado Rabioso was [him]." The use of the band's name has also been described as a contractual obligation. Artaud was recorded at studio Phonalex in the barrio of Belgrano, a few blocks from the Spinetta house. Journalist Miguel Grinberg described the sessions as "a very private ceremony". According to Rodolfo García, the songs were "practically made in the studio" and recorded in few takes. He stated that in "Superchería" and "Las habladurías del mundo", "the concept with which the tracks were created was similar: to play them with absolute freedom [and] the biggest swing of which we capable". Spinetta composed and recorded almost the entire album with a Harptone acoustic guitar that he called "the Standel". (Note: There is a confusion regarding this guitar. Standel is an American manufacturer of guitar amplifiers that in 1967 commissioned Harptone to build some guitars to sell under its brand. However, it is known that Spinetta's guitar is a pure Harptone, although the exact model is unknown since the label with the serial number no longer appears on the instrument case.) Lyricist Roberto Mouro has claimed that Spinetta used a Hagström electric guitar in "Todas las hojas son del viento", while journalist Juan Carlos Diez recalled that the musician told him that he recorded the whole album with a mahogany-colored acoustic Gibson guitar. Artaud was produced by publisher Jorge Álvarez for his label Microfón, a subsidiary of record company Talent. Álvarez had founded Microfón after the 1970 closure of his company Mandioca, the first independent record label of Argentine rock. During the late 1960s and early 1970s, the circulation of Artaud's bibliography intensified and Álvarez played an important role in this process by publishing an anthology of the poet in 1968.

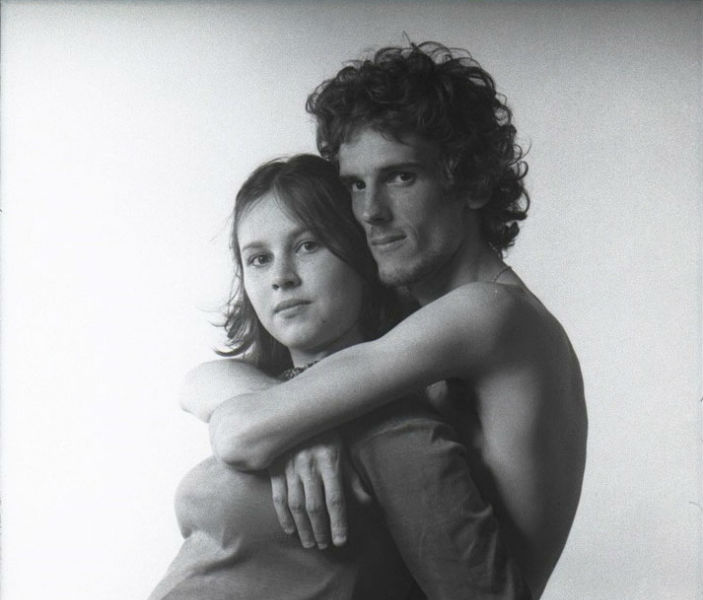
Spinetta and Patricia Salazar in 1976. Their pairing in 1973 was a major influence in Artaud.

The creation of the album was deeply influenced by changes in the musician's personal life. Twenty-three-year-old Spinetta considered that it was time to settle down and stay away from the excesses, so he decided to return to his parents' house in Belgrano. During that time, he was beginning a relationship with Patricia Salazar, with whom he would remain for over twenty-five years and have four children. His brother Gustavo Spinetta stated in 2009 that the music and lyrics in Artaud were the result of the "climate of much love" in which Luis Alberto and Salazar lived.

If we remember that in 1968 Los Abuelos de la Nada practically imposed the porteño version of psychedelic pop with "Diana divaga" and that in 1973 Luis Alberto Spinetta released Artaud—perhaps the pinnacle of Argentine rocker avant-garde—it is hard to accept that it was a mere temporary coincidence. There was in those years a correlate between the political and social turbulence of the country and the growth of a music that, apparently, did not seem to be too attentive or interested in the revolutionary utopia, at least as the guerrilla organizations imagined it.

— Sergio Pujol, 2015.

Writers often analyze Artaud in relation to the convulsive sociopolitical context of Argentina in 1973, with the fall of the military dictatorship, Héctor José Cámpora's electoral win and the news of Perón's return bringing "a hope of liberty in the midst of oppression." This short period under Cámpora's rule is known as the "Camporist Spring" (Spanish: "primavera camporista") and was characterized by a new sense of liberation and optimism among young people. Discussing the social context in which Spinetta produced "Artaud", Grinberg told Rolling Stone: "At that time we were all Peronists. After the results of Héctor Campora's triumph were known, I remember that there was a spirit of total liberation fervor. Suddenly a truck full of people passed by Teatro General San Martín and I see a hanging Luis hugging a bunch of young people." In the summer of 1973, underground art and press grew in dimension, with parks and alternative magazines being their means of communication. Spinetta took part in Sunday youth gatherings that Miguel Grinberg organized in Parque Centenario through his radio program El son progresivo, where people formed groups dedicated to rock nacional, poetry, theater, psychology and plastic arts; and edited a magazine made collectively every Sunday. (Note: Scans of the Parque magazine can be found digitized as part of a project led by writers Osvaldo Baigorra and Carlos Grandin.) Some of the other musicians that went to Parque Centenario included Emilio Del Guercio, Rodolfo García, Gustavo Spinetta, Miguel Abuelo and, "without integrating so much", Raúl Porchetto and León Gieco. These meetings, which managed to gather 500 people, have been described by Rock.com.ar as "a true experiment of community integration, [with] debates taking place between the people of the park and the occasional passers-by." According to Del Guercio, they "were concerned to know what was going to be the place of art and culture in the society to come, how the personal transformation of each one and the understanding of the other could modify society"; according to Schanton, Artaud is the "offspring of that total liberty".

== Concept ==
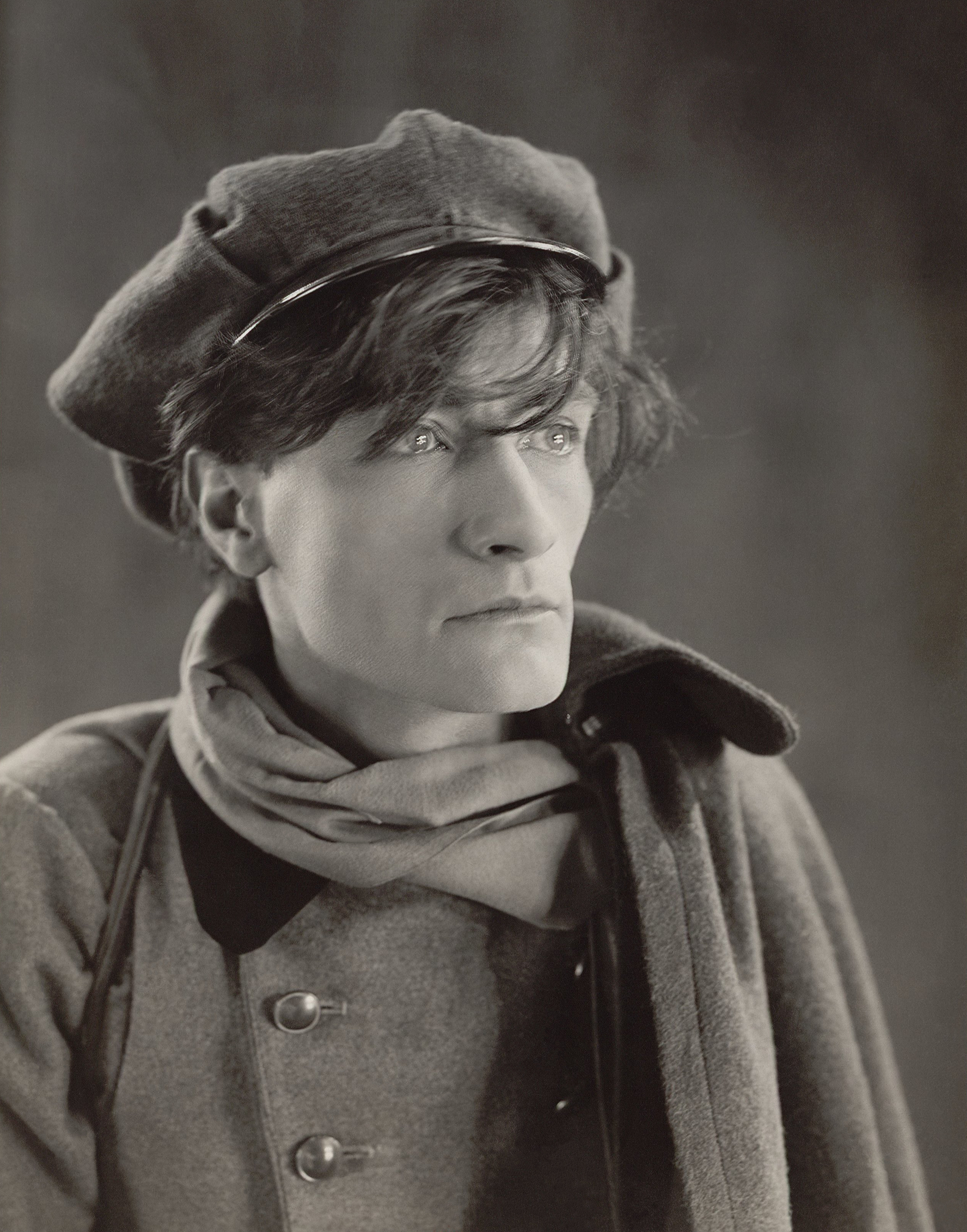
Antonin Artaud in 1926. Spinetta was deeply impacted by the suffering conveyed in his writing.

Artaud has been described as "the most literary record of rock nacional", along with Vox Dei's 1971 album La Biblia. Writer Juan Pablo Bertazza considered that the album "reaches the closest and most fertile and visceral point that there can be between music and poetry, or better: between music and literature." Spinetta was an avid reader and literature was a fundamental influence throughout his career; such as Julio Cortázar in Almendra, Carlos Castaneda in Spinetta Jade and Carl Jung and Chinese philosophy in Invisible. At the time of Artaud's composition, the poètes maudits and surrealist literature were a great influence on him. In addition to Antonin Artaud, Spinetta read other French poets such as Arthur Rimbaud, René Daumal, Charles Baudelaire, Jean Cocteau, André Breton and Comte de Lautréamont.

Spinetta discovered Artaud through Jorge Pistocchi, a journalist and artist. In a November 1972 Pescado Rabioso interview for Gente magazine, Spinetta discussed his affinity with poetry and described Rimbaud as "a rock guy a hundred years ago", as he "developed in a way to express his inner sensuality and to express his own energy in a luminous way". He also mentioned Artaud in the same manner, stating that he: "lived the life of a rocker, like Hendrix... The vibes that Artaud threw for other men to understand were thinking, you see, thinking and thinking, really thinking about what it is that happens. Musically, that's Hendrix, for example." Artaud's influence has been linked to the "iconoclast and libertarian spirit" of the album.

Spinetta was particularly influenced by his essays Heliogabalus; or, the Crowned Anarchist (French: "Héliogabale ou l'anarchiste couronné") and Van Gogh, The Man Suicided by Society (French: "Van Gogh le suicidé de la société"). He envisioned the album as an "antidote" to the nihilistic message and "contagion of pain" conveyed in Artaud's work. Spinetta told author Eduardo Berti in 1988: "Whoever has read him can not escape a quota of desperation. To him the answer of man is madness; to [John] Lennon it is love. I believe more in the encounter of perfection and happiness through the suppression of pain than through madness and suffering. I believe that only if we worry about healing the soul we will avoid social distortions and fascist behavior, unjust doctrines and totalitarianism, absurd policies and deplorable wars. The only way to raise the weight is with love."

== Composition ==
The album has been described as "a monumental piece of psychedelic and pastoral folk". Writing for Gibson's website in 2011, Kiko Jones described the album's sound: "Showing influences of progressive rock and touches of psychedelia alongside his singer-songwriter feel, Spinetta skillfully manages to create in Artaud a kind of musical bridge between the rock current of the late 60s and the beginning of the 70s." Likewise, American music journalist Richie Unterberger noted: "If it's something of a progressive/psychedelic record, it has more to do with the juxtaposition of late-'60s and early-'70s styles on display than it has to do with the music itself." Germán Arrascaeta of La Voz del Interior described the album's content in 2015 as "abrasive psychedelia". Artaud has been linked to a period of "reflexive psychedelia" in Argentine rock during the 1970s, evident in the lyrics of Molinari, Pappo and Vox Dei's Nacho Smilari. Gustavo Spinetta told journalist Oscar Jalil in 2013: "We were crazy about Neil Young's Harvest which has a very homemade fluency. Somehow I felt like I was playing that music." Music journalist Claudio Kleiman felt that John Lennon's 1970 album John Lennon/Plastic Ono Band was an antecedent of Artaud because of its "emotional and musical nudity", while also noting similarities in their "stripped instrumentation" and the fact that both Spinetta and Lennon chose to record with a few old friends.

The album was produced at a time when there was a rivalry within Argentine rock, between those who played acoustic music and those who favored an electric, "heavier" style. In this sense, it is considered that Artaud managed to unite these two opposite movements.

Writing for Chilean newspaper La Tercera in 2017, Alejandro Jofré felt that Spinetta uses his voice as another instrument.

The album's "complex" songs denoted a marked harmonic incorporation of jazz in Spinetta's music, prefiguring its central influence in the following years. While he incorporated even more jazz influences with Invisible, a band he formed as Artaud was being released, Spinetta completely immersed himself in jazz-fusion rock with the 1977 album A 18' del sol, inaugurating later a "jazz period" in his discography with his band Spinetta-Jade that alienated fans and lasted until the mid 1980s.

Spinetta reflected in 2008 that the album "represents a very interesting return to the creative source of songs within [him]" and that it established the possibility of deconstructing his previous work with Pescado Rabioso to "keep growing". Umberto Pérez of Spanish magazine Efe Eme felt that Spinetta "returned to the source to break it", as he "invoked the acoustic and free spirit of Almendra to capture one of the most intimate moments of his life".

=== Side one ===
==== "Todas la hojas son del viento" ====
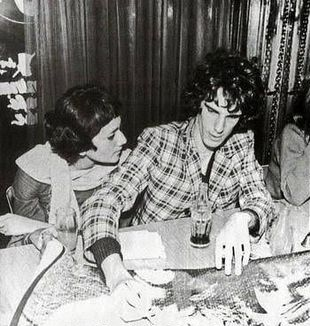
Spinetta with Cristina Bustamante, to whom "Todas las hojas son del viento" is referred, circa 1970.

Perhaps the "most accessible moment" on Artaud, opener "Todas las hojas son del viento" (English: "All Leaves Belong to the Wind") is a folk rock ballad with a predominantly acoustic sound, although it contains an electric guitar solo at the end. Spinetta's acoustic guitar moves through the musical notes G, F and D, with an irregular phrasing that was characteristic of his music. It has been described as "perhaps Artaud's most accessible moment". Pedro Ogrodnik C. of Colombian magazine Rockaxis noted the simplicity and "warm climate" of the short track, and felt it was very reminiscent of Sui Generis' work. It is a well-known Spinetta classic.

The song's lyrics deal with parenting from a countercultural perspective, although Spinetta had yet to be a father. Instead, he was inspired by the pregnancy of his former girlfriend, Cristina Bustamante, who was pregnant by another man. He had "sealed the relationship" with Bustamante in "Blues de Cris", a track included in Pescado Rabioso's 1972 debut album, but they remained in contact. Spinetta wrote the song after she told him that she had doubts about continuing with her pregnancy, which she eventually carried through with. He told Berti: "I wrote 'Todas las hojas son del viento' because at that moment she was like a leaf in the wind, having to decide such a thing." Pablo Schanton compared the song to Graham Nash's "Teach Your Children" and Pink Floyd, as it "provides light instructions for rockers who mature and form families, and must face paternity while being antipaternal."

==== "Cementerio Club" ====
Walter Gazzo of MDZ Online described "Cementerio Club" ("Cemetery Club") as "a track in blues rock fashion, very electric and sharp, that contains enigmatic and depressive lyrics". Jazz influences have been noted, particularly for "the harmonic choice, in a minor scale, as well as the enhancement of weak times".

Spinetta described its lyrics as a "controlled irony", intended to convey the coldness of a woman who has left him; with lines such as "How sad and lonely I will be in this cemetery/ How hot will be without you in the summer" (Spanish: "Qué sólo y triste voy a estar en este cementerio/Qué calor hará sin vos en el verano") and "Hey, baby tell me, where do you see something in me you don't detest?" (Spanish: "Oye, dime nena, ¿adónde ves, ahora algo en mí, que no detestes?").

==== "Por" ====
Written alongside partner Patricia Salazar, the lyrics of "Por" (Spanish preposition "through", also "by" and "for") are one of the most atypical in Spinetta's career, consisting of forty seven loose nouns chosen to fit the pre-existing melodic lines. For instance, the poem begins: "Árbol, hoja, salto, luz, aproximación, mueble, lana, gusto, pie, té, mar, gas, mirada" ("Tree, leaf, jump, light, approximation, furniture, wool, taste, foot, tea, sea, gas, look"). The technique has been compared to concrete poetry and the Dadaist exquisite corpse.

In addition to choosing the words to fit the song, the duo also did so because of their meaning. Spinetta explained: "['Por' was an exercise on] how I could make the song say a word and at the same time be telling a narrative, so to speak. Although that is not exactly what I was looking for, to narrate something, but to have the words go with the music and talk [about something]." The track has been described as a "maximum disarticulation of the poetic discourse", a "rupture of the syntagma" and "perhaps [Spinetta's] most radicalized and surrealist song." When asked if the words responded to a hidden logic, Spinetta replied: "It is kind of a surreal logic. [...] Since the music was already written, it was all a matter of the words entering right into the metric.'Gesticulador' ('gesticulator'), for example, is set to fit in."

Regarding the song's lyrics, Pablo Schanton of Rolling Stone Argentina reflected: "There is a rediscovery of the poetic dimension of words that can only be achieved by freeing them from the sentence." La Tercera's Alejandro Jofré felt that "Por" "proves that Spinetta was a free and modern creator."

==== "Superchería" ====
Spinetta leaves his acoustic vein in "Superchería" (a variation of Spanish "superstición", English: "superstition" "quackery", particularly practiced on or by the ignorant) "trickery"), a song that according to journalist Walter Gazzo, would "fit very well" in Pescado Rabioso's previous albums. He described it as a "typical" rock track that features "rhythmic and climatic cuts" that bring it closer to jazz. Rockaxis's Pedro Ogrodnik C. felt that "Superchería" possessed "an air more typical of Almendra" due to the participation of Emilio Del Guercio and Rodolfo García. The song has at least three different sections that are linked together. It starts with a waltz-like, triple meter cadence, with Spinetta singing the lyric "superstition" (Spanish: "superstición") and a kind of scatting.

==== "La sed verdadera" ====
"La sed verdadera" (English: "The True Thirst") has been considered "one of the most inspired, intimate, and personal tracks that Luis ever recorded." Spinetta opens the song with the lines: "I know well you've heard about me/And today we meet here/But peace in me you'll never find/If not in you/In me you'll never find it" (Spanish: "Sé muy bien que has oído hablar de mí/Y hoy nos vemos aquí/Pero la paz en mí nunca la encontrarás/Si no es en vos/En mí nunca la encontrarás").

Spinetta stated that the song's lyrics are about the "intimacy" and "immensity" of being. The "true thirst" of the title refers to what Spinetta described as the urge "to cover, recognize and make the universe familiar". He explained:

Not only man is made of the universe because the molecules are created in the universe, which is incumbent on the Earth and all the planets, but also, having his star soul is what makes the being speak of its inner immensity. That is to say, not only because of the biological, critical sense, but because of its poetic and abyssal nature.

The song seems to explore or tap into feelings of metaphysical angst related to being vs. nothingness:

"Around your living room, or outside,

you're not there.

But there's someone else there,

and it's not me,

I'm only talking to you from here.

He must be

the music that you've never composed"

(Spanish: "Por tu living o fuera de allí no estás/Pero hay otro que está/Y yo no soy/Yo sólo te hablo desde aquí/Él debe ser/La música que nunca hiciste")

and later concludes:

"The lights leaping in the distance

aren't waiting for you to go

to turn them off",.

(Spanish: "Las luces que saltan a lo lejos/No esperan que vayas a apagarlas")

=== Side two ===
==== "Cantata de puentes amarillos" ====
"Cantata de puentes amarillos"
Artaud's centerpiece, "Cantata de puentes amarillos" is organized as a suite with several distinct sections. In this sample, the song changes from one section to another.

The acoustic 9-minute "Cantata de puentes amarillos" (English: "Cantata of yellow bridges") is the album's centerpiece and "most impactful" song. It once again only features Spinetta and his guitar, who put the song together in the recording studio by superimposing voices and guitars that he recorded himself. It has been described as a combination of English progressive folk with Argentine folk music.

Organized as a suite, the song goes through five distinct sections that Spinetta referred to as "modules". In this sense, it is considered a "similar exploration" to his previous composition "Cristálida", included in Pescado Rabioso's Pescado 2. Spinetta noted that "while the modules of 'Cristálida' are repeated in a rotating way, those of 'Cantata' are different from each other." CONICET's Jorge Monteleone described the song in 2010: "the voice of Spinetta is articulated solitarily in unexpected harmonic resolutions of the acoustic guitar and alternates rhythms where the images and the enunciative registers [...] overlap in modules, different from each other." He considered "Cantata de puentes amarillos" to be a "pulverization of the pop song", linking it to "Cristálida" and the Beatles' "A Day in the Life" (from Sgt. Pepper's Lonely Hearts Club Band). Santiago Giordano of La Voz del Interior felt that in the track, "Spinetta overcomes the formal schemes of the canción genre."

"Cantata de puentes amarillos" is the song in which the influence of Artaud's writings are most evident. Due to his reading of Artaud's Van Gogh, The Man Suicided by Society, Spinetta came into contact with van Gogh's letters to his brother Theo and incorporated several images from them into the song's lyrics. For example, the "yellow bridges" (Spanish: "puentes amarillos") are presumedly inspired by Langlois Bridge at Arles, his only painting featuring a yellow bridge. Furthermore, van Gogh's painting Road with Cypress and Star is referenced in the lyrics: "Those shadows on the blue road/Where have they gone?/I compare them with cypresses/seen only in dreams" (Spanish: "Aquellas sombras del camino azul/¿Dónde están?/Yo las comparo con cipreses que vi solo en sueños"). In one of his letters, van Gogh reflects on the suffering of a caged bird that has food and health, but still longs to be free like the other birds. This inspired Spinetta's lyrics: "Look at the bird, he dies in his cage" (Spanish: "Mira el pájaro, se muere en su jaula").

==== "Bajan" ====
"Bajan" has been considered Spinetta's most Beatlesque song since the Almendra years. It is perhaps the most optimistic song on the record, referring to the passage of time from the place of youth with lyrics such as "I have time to know/if what I dream will end in something" (Spanish: "Tengo tiempo para saber/Si lo que sueño concluye en algo"). Spinetta once again refers to nature, with images like "the old oak", "the day that sits to die", "the night that clouds endlessly", and the sun and the moon as two ideal faces of the human." Kleiman felt that the final lines "And besides/You are the sun/Gently as well/You can be the moon" (Spanish: "Y además/Vos sos el sol/Despacio también/Podés ser la luna") have a "clear connection with hippie utopia, still present both in Luis' mind and in the dreams of his generation."

==== "A Starosta, el idiota" ====
(English "To Starosta, the Idiot") In the final verses of the song, Spinetta sings "The idiot/I can't help him anymore/He will burn, staring at the sun" (Spanish: "El idiota/ya nada puedo hacer por él/él se quemará, mirando al sol"). Daniel Mecca and Martina Nudelman of Clarín felt that these lyrics "pose, as a synthesis, the root of the poetic concept of Spinetta: to not remain fixed in one place." In the psychedelic interlude, towards the end a small portion of the recording of "She Loves You" by the Beatles can be heard.

==== "Las habladurías del mundo" ====
Richie Unterberger described it as "a taut Latin-flavored rocker vaguely reminiscent of early Santana". Sergio Ariza Lázaro of Diariocrítico.com felt the track sounded like Almendra's second album. The title means "The chit-chat of the world" (habladurías: lit. "sayings", "chit chat", "gossip", "rumors") and part of the lyrics say "I see, I see/words are never the best thing/to avoid going naked" ("Veo, veo las palabras nunca son/lo mejor para no/andar desnudos") with "Veo, veo" (lit. "I see, I see") being also the name of a traditional children's guessing game, where one is challented to see hidden objects in plain sight. The chorus states "I'm no longer tied to any dream/The chit chat of the world can't trap me anymore" ("No estoy atado a ningún sueño ya/Las habladurías del mundo/no pueden atraparme")

== Release and promotion ==
Flyer promoting the presentation of Artaud on "Sunday 26"—presumably August— in the Teatro Astral in Buenos Aires. It features a drawing by Spinetta.

Artaud was released in October 1973 on Talent-Microfón. "Todas las hojas son del viento" was released alongside B-side "Superchería" as the album's only promotional single that same year. Despite the novelty of its cover art, the label did not give Artaud any special promotional campaign and the album shared its October 1973 advertisement along with nine other titles, among them Lebón's debut, Color Humano 3, Confesiones de invierno and Aquelarre's Brumas. Journalist and friend Miguel Grinberg helped promote the concert presentation of Artaud by interviewing Spinetta on Radio Municipal and by printing posters and banners. Upon release, a reviewer for specialized magazine Pelo praised the album as "the freest and most beautiful long play that I heard in a long time." In its following issue, the magazine stated: "If he wanted, Spinetta could develop a large part of his wealth of creative material as a soloist. He again demonstrated it magically in Artaud."

Spinetta presented Artaud with two morning shows at the Teatro Astral on Avenida Corrientes, one of the few and most emblematic venues where Argentine rock artists could perform during the early 1970s. Despite the sustained growth that the rock nacional movement had been experiencing, venues were made available sporadically and only in the morning or late night hours, as the genre had yet to "reach the necessary status to deserve the central schedules." In addition to Spinetta as a soloist and alongside Pescado Rabioso and later Invisible, other acts that performed at Teatro Astral during those years include Manal, Moris, Color Humano, Sui Géneris and Crucis.

One of the Teatro Astral presentations took place before the album was released and the other some time later, although the exact dates are disputed. After the advent of the Internet, bootleg recordings of the shows have appeared on YouTube and blogs dedicated to Spinetta, becoming some of the artist's most celebrated unofficial releases. Of the two recordings that circulate on the Internet, only that of October 28, 1973, is the real date of the second show. The first one, supposedly from October 23, 1973, cannot be possible because that day was a Tuesday and both concerts were held on Sunday mornings. Some publications continue to misuse this date. Instead, the correct date may have been August 26 or September 23. Berti has supported the idea that the presentation occurred in September, as have done some contemporary writers. After years of circulating online, the October 28, 1973, bootleg—made by a young fan with a monaural Philips recorder—finally received its official release as a live album in 2020, titled Presentación Artaud 1973. The recordings were mastered by engineer Mariano López, and the album cover features drawings by Spinetta that were taken from the flyers of the show.

The Teatro Astral show is considered "one of the most legendary concerts" in Argentine rock history. They featured Spinetta accompanied only by his acoustic guitar, and before performing he projected the films The Cabinet of Dr. Caligari and An Andalusian Dog, in addition to giving each audience member a copy of his manifesto Rock: Música dura, la suicidada por la sociedad.

Despite the imminence of his debut with Invisible, Spinetta presented the album again in December at the Atenas stadium in La Plata, the capital city of Buenos Aires Province. He went accompanied by Grinberg, Robertone and brother Gustavo, who had also helped him in the Astral concerts. The event was publicized as Pescado Rabioso's farewell concert. Like the Astral theater concerts, the exact date of the show in La Plata is disputed.

=== Packaging ===
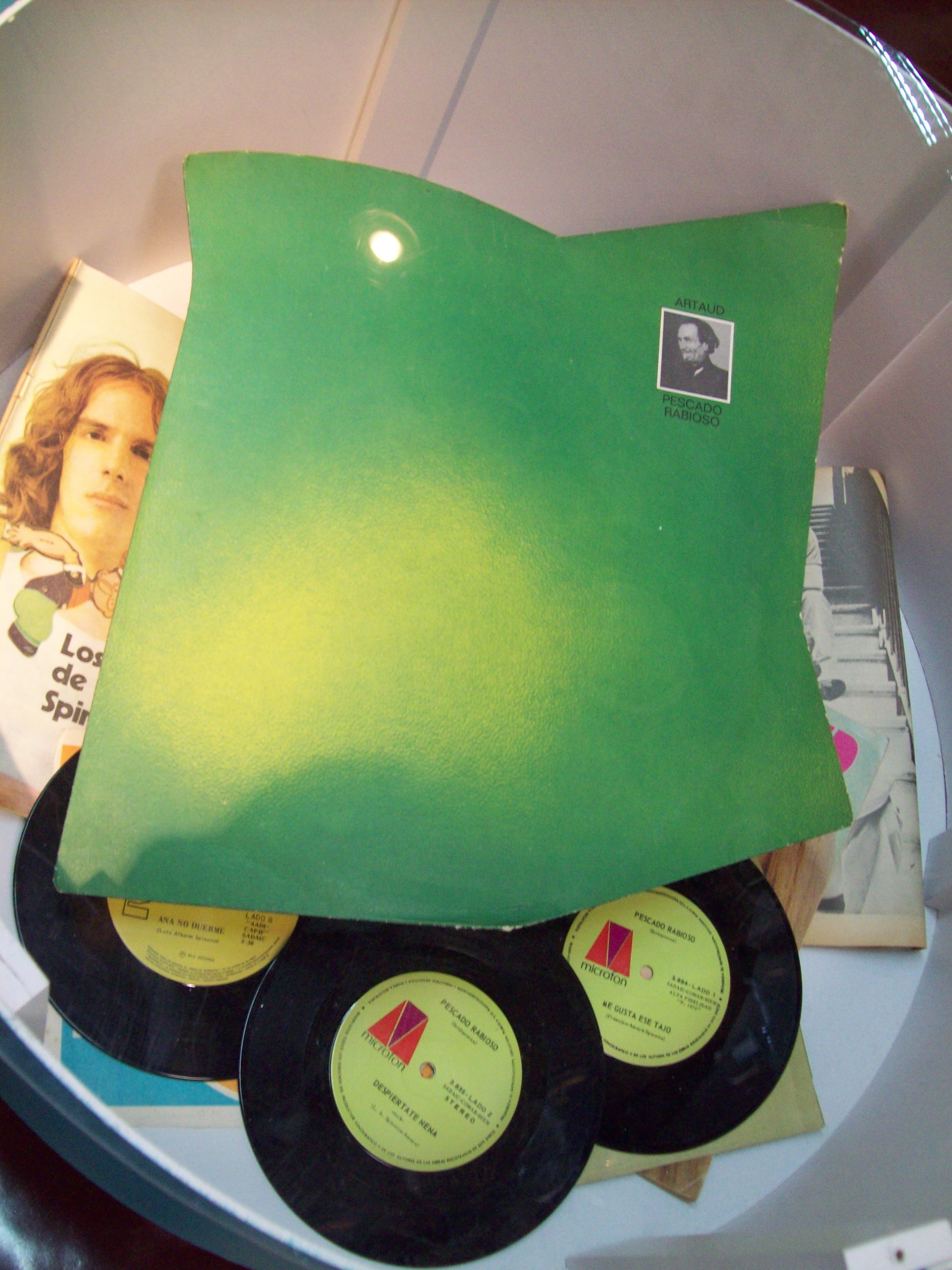
The original packaging on display at the National Library. As seen in this copy, the cover was usually perforated to be nailed or hanged to a wall due to its unique design.

The original album cover is notorious for its unique "irregular trapezoid" shape, featuring a green and yellow composition that alludes to a phrase written by Antonin Artaud in 1937, which can be read in the record's booklet: "Are not green and yellow each of the opposite colors of death, green for resurrection and yellow for decomposition and decay?" A small photograph of the poet appears in its right upper angle. Artaud's cover was based on a sketch by Spinetta and designed by Juan Gatti, a designer, photographer and plastic artist (who has later stood out for being the author of graphic designs related to Pedro Almodóvar's films), who also did the artwork of several other Argentine rock artists of the 1970s, such as Moris, Crucis, Pappo's Blues, Billy Bond y La Pesada del Rock and Roll and Sui Generis. Gatti has said that the aim was to make "a disturbing and uncomfortable object, something that annoys", and has described it as a product of its time, when feelings of challenging the established were prevalent among the youth. He also recalled in 2013: "The album I think was more a conclusion of Luis that was super excited with Artaud and before the record we were already talking about him and other French poets. So it was normal for that record to come out. [...] We were in the present and what really interested us was having fun. Perhaps of all of us it was Luis who had the most cultural and perishable pretensions.

Artaud contained a large booklet that also set it apart from other records; it was inspired by medical leaflets, something that has been likened to the album's aim at being a "remedy" to the French poet's writings. Writing for the Argentine Rolling Stone in 2013, Fernando García considered the "arch-legendary star-shaped cover" to be a work of art, as it "breaks with the function of a design object" and "its geometry slowly pushes the record towards the margin of the useless, the unusable." He also reflected: "Perhaps Artaud, the cover, is a lost link between concrete art and pop art." In the album's entry of the magazine's 2007 list of the 100 Best Albums of Argentine Rock, Pablo Schanton analyzed the cover:

... the object-record was a misfit: it denounced with its deformity the quadrature, the lack of freedom and the submission to the industrial geometry of the rest. What a better synthesis on the life and work of Antonin Artaud. [...] For the neurosis of collectors, it is impossible to find an original Artaud cover without worn ends: that challenge to the geometric and industrial patrons (parents) (Note: The Spanish word padres can either mean "parents" or "fathers". Schanton is referring to a 1936 Antonin Artaud quote: "More than a literary movement, [surrealism] has been a moral revolution, the organic cry of man, the words of our being against all coercion. First, against the coercion of the Father.") was paid with degradation. Another way to talk about the tragic fate of Artaud.

The album required a different kind of exhibition, usually nailed to the wall or hanging.

Artaud's original release is a prized object among record collectors costing close to 30,000 pesos as of 2016.

=== Reissues ===
The first CD issue of Artaud, released on Microfón in 1992, mistakenly included five songs by Nito Mestre. The company decided not to remove these CDs from circulation, but to wait for them to be sold completely before correcting the error. Today this release is a valued collector's item.

In the early 2010s, the vinyl revival phenomenon reached Argentina and record label Sony Music decided to reissue several sought-after classics of Argentine rock in that format. Artaud was the "spearhead" of this series of reissues, which included titles by Soda Stereo, Virus, Charly García and several of Spinetta's bands. The series was released on May 21, 2015, and was a big success, with the reissues selling out in a few days. The reissue of Artaud was by far the best-selling vinyl of the bunch. Sony Music Argentina president Damián Amanto attributed this to the fact that the rerelease reproduced the record's historical artwork, which had made the original 1973 release one of the most demanded albums by collectors. He told biographer Sergio Marchi in 2019: "Of course, Artaud sells more vinyl records than Ricardo Arjona. [But also] more than AC/DC and the Beatles. Beyond the quality of his music I could not tell you the reason why. [...] Artaud is completely out of order, because Pescado 2 is also one of the best-selling records, but Artaud greatly surpasses it. Spinetta is one of the most edited artists on vinyl throughout his different formations, because he has many works. And he is one of the best sellers in that format, if not the most."

== Legacy ==
Artaud is considered Spinetta's masterpiece, as well as one of the most revolutionary and influential albums of Argentine rock, having been regarded as the greatest album in the history of the genre on several occasions. Eduardo Santos of Noisey described it in 2016 as "one of the key records in the history of Argentine and Latin American rock that, thanks to that journey between the real and the oneiric manifested in its nine songs, was engraved in the history of music." In 2014, the Peruvian newspaper Trome described Artaud as the most influential album of rock en español. Chilean newspaper El Ciudadano wrote in 2016 that the album "marked generations of artists across the continent." Upon the musician's death in 2012, author Juan Pablo Bertazza considered that Artaud is the album that "best explains why Spinetta raised the Argentine cultural level". Journalist Walter Medina reflected: "I imagined our cultural history without Artaud and I did not need greater imaginary absences to reach the total certainty that, even with the richness that characterizes it, the history of Argentine music and culture would be [a whole different story] without the work of [Spinetta]."

A July 1985 survey by journalist Carlos Polimeni for Clarín ranked Artaud as the third greatest album in the history of Argentine rock. Among its fifty respondents were journalists Pipo Lernoud, Miguel Grinberg and Víctor Pintos; and musicians Charly García, Gustavo Cerati, Pappo, León Gieco, Oscar Moro and Litto Nebbia. The album was further revalued over time; and in the 67th number of the Argentine edition of Rolling Stone, issued in October 2003, Oscar Jalil wrote: "Above any revisionism, Artaud is the perfect work of rock culture, loaded with arrows directed to different artistic disciplines." In 2007, the magazine eventually ranked it number one in its list of the "100 Best Albums of Argentine Rock". In its entry, Pablo Schanton describes it as "a liberating cultural event" and "an aura of something unrepeatable [...] The aura of doing and being rock in a more direct, more artistic, more handcrafted and less massive manner." Spanish online newspaper Diariocrítico.com included the album in its 2016 feature of "The 20 Best Records of Argentina", with journalist Sergio Ariza Lázaro describing it as "probably the best album on this list and one of the best rock albums made in Castilian." Chilean newspaper La Tercera ranked Artaud second in its 2017 list of "The 20 Best Albums of Argentine Rock".

In the 2017 book Los 138 discos que nadie te recomendó, writers Sergio Coscia and Ernesto Gontrán Castrillón felt that "Cantata de puentes amarillos" "could well be an alternative national anthem". American magazine Al Borde ranked "Todas las hojas son del viento" 220th in its 2007 list of "The 500 [Songs] of Ibero-American Rock". Ramón Garibaldo Valdéz and Mario Bahena Urióstegui argue that its release made Argentine rock the largest dissident musical movement on the continent. Clarín's Diego Huerta described it in 2012 as "a revolutionary, countercultural work." CONICET's Sergio Pujol felt that the release of Artaud signified the culmination of a process of maturation and detachment from commercial pressures.

In a 1992 interview, fellow Argentine rock icon Charly García called Spinetta one of his influences and, when asked which of his songs he would like to have composed, he replied: "Artaud, the whole record".

In June 2019, Argentine label RGS released a CD tribute album titled Artaud: un homenaje a un gran disco (English: "Artaud, an homage to a great record"), which replicates the original artwork and includes the nine tracks in the same order, each versioned by a different artist.

On January 23, 2020, Google celebrated what would have been Spinetta's 70th birthday with a Doodle which, besides Argentina, appeared in Austria, Bolivia, Bulgaria, Chile, Colombia, Ecuador, Germany, Iceland, Italy, Paraguay, Peru, Spain, Switzerland, Uruguay and Vietnam. Green predominates in the homage, commemorating Artaud's iconic album cover.

== Track listing ==
All tracks are written by Luis Alberto Spinetta.

Side A
No.	Title	Length
1.	"Todas las Hojas Son del Viento"	2:12
2.	"Cementerio Club"	4:55
3.	"Por"	1:45
4.	"Superchería"	4:21
5.	"La Sed Verdadera"	3:32

Side B
No.	Title	Length
6.	"Cantata de Puentes Amarillos"	9:12
7.	"Bajan"	3:26
8.	"A Starosta, el Idiota"	3:15
9.	"Las Habladurías del Mundo"	4:03
Total length:		36:56

== Personnel ==
Credits adapted from the liner notes of Artaud, except where otherwise noted.

- Luis Alberto Spinetta – composer, vocals, producer, acoustic and electric guitars, piano, maracas, cymbal, cover design
- Jorge Álvarez – producer
- Carlos Gustavo Spinetta – drums in "Cementerio Club" and "Bajan"
- Emilio Del Guercio – bass in "Cementerio Club", "Superchería", "Bajan" and "Las Habladurías Del Mundo"; backing vocals in "Superchería" and "Las Habladurías Del Mundo"
- Rodolfo García – drums, cowbell and backing vocals in "Superchería" and "Las Habladurías Del Mundo"
- Norberto Orliac – audio engineer
- Juan Orestes Gatti – cover design

== Charts ==
Weekly chart performance for Artaud
Chart (2023)	Peak position
Argentine Albums (CAPIF)	2

Weekly chart performance for Artaud
Chart (2025)	Peak position
Argentine Albums (CAPIF)	1

== See also ==
- 1973 in Argentina
- 1973 in music
- Music of Argentina
- Origins of Argentine rock
- Psychedelic era
- Psychedelic rock in Latin America

== Bibliography ==
- Diez, Juan Carlos (2012) [2006]. Martropía. Conversaciones con Spinetta (in Spanish). Buenos Aires: Aguilar. ISBN 978-987-04-2677-6.
- "Mis discos favoritos" and "Artaud". La Mano (magazine) (in Spanish). No. 25. Buenos Aires, Argentina. April 2006. pp. 31, 50–51. ISSN 1668-3005.
- Marchi, Sergio (2019). Spinetta: Ruido de magia (in Spanish). Buenos Aires, Argentina: Planeta. ISBN 978-950-49-6461-2.
- de Moraes, Karin Helena Antunes (2016). "Las habladurías del mundo no pueden atraparnos: a estética de Artaud como elemento de compreensão histórico-social da Argentina (1966-1973)" (PDF). Anais do II Simpósio Internacional Pensar e Repensar a América Latina (in Portuguese). São Paulo, Brazil: University of São Paulo. ISBN 978-857-20-5159-0.
- Ortelli, Juan (2013). Historia y obra de Luis Alberto Spinetta. Serie bookazine (Rolling Stone Argentina) (in Spanish). Buenos Aires: La Nación. ISBN 978-987-1690-50-3.
- "La herencia invisible" and "Discos" (PDF). Pelo (magazine) (in Spanish). No. 43. Buenos Aires, Argentina: Década SRL. Available online in the Digital Historical Archive of Pelo magazine, developed by the National University of Quilmes. 1973. pp. 10–11 and 18.
- Pujol, Sergio (2019). El año de Artaud (digital file) (in Spanish). Buenos Aires: Planeta. ISBN 978-950-49-6682-1.
- Spinetta, Luis A.; Berti, Eduardo (2014) [1988]. Crónica e iluminaciones (in Spanish). Buenos Aires: Editora AC, Planeta. ISBN 978-950-49-4055-5.
