= Manal (album) =

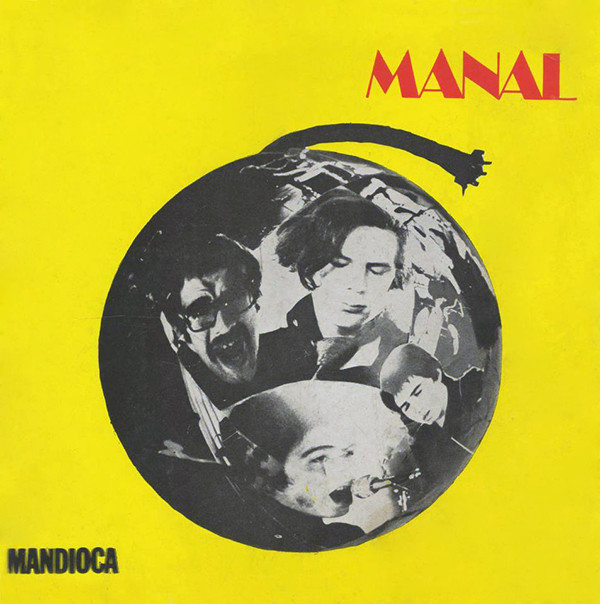

Studio album by Manal
- Released: March 1970
- Recorded: 1969–1970
- Studio: TNT Studios, Buenos Aires
- Genre: Blues rock
- Language: Spanish
- Label: Mandioca
- Producer: Jorge Álvarez, Pedro Pujó

Manal chronology
Manal (1970)	El león (1970)

Singles from Manal
- 1. "Jugo de tomate / Avenida Rivadavia" Released: 1970

Manal is the first album of Argentine blues rock band of the same name, released by Mandioca in 1970.

This was the only album of the band issued by Mandioca, the independent label created by producer Jorge Álvarez. Their second LP El león was put out by RCA Records.

== Tracklist ==
All tracks by Javier Martínez, except where otherwise noted.

Side One

1. "Jugo de tomate" — 2:45
2. "Porque hoy nací" — 4:30
3. "Avenida Rivadavia" — 2:50
4. "Todo el día me pregunto" — (Martínez, Claudio Gabis, Alejandro Medina) — 6:10

Side Two

5. "Avellaneda Blues" — (Martínez, Gabis) — 5:30
6. "Casa con 10 pinos" — 4:15
7. "Informe de un día" — 8:00

== Personnel ==
- Javier Martínez - drums (tracks 1, 3–7), vocals (tracks 1, 2, 4–7), electric guitar (track 2)
- Claudio Gabis - electric guitar (tracks 1, 3–7), harmonica (track 1), organ (track 2), organ bass (track 2), piano (tracks 5, 7), acoustic guitar (track 6)
- Alejandro Medina - bass (tracks 1, 3–7), vocals (tracks 3, 7), acoustic guitar (track 4), piano (track 6), organ (track 7)

== See also ==
- Argentine rock
- Almendra
- La Biblia

== Bibliography and references ==
- Alabarces, Pablo (November 1, 1993). Entre gatos y violadores: el rock nacional en la cultura argentina (in Spanish). Buenos Aires, Argentina: Colihue. ISBN 950-581-243-4.
