= Pescado 2 =

Studio album by Pescado Rabioso
- Released: 1973
- Recorded: November 1972 – February 1973
- Studio: Estudios Phonalex, Buenos Aires
- Genre: Psychedelic rock; hard rock; blues rock; folk rock; progressive rock
- Length: 73:40
- Language: Spanish
- Label: Talent-Microfón
- Producer: Pescado Rabioso; Jorge Álvarez

Pescado Rabioso chronology
Desatormentándonos (1972)	Pescado 2 (1973)	Artaud (1973)

Pescado 2, also known as Pescado Rabioso 2, is the second studio album by Argentine rock band Pescado Rabioso, released in 1973 on Talent-Microfón. It was recorded between November 1972 and February 1973 at Estudios Phonalex in Buenos Aires, shortly before the group's disbandment. Pescado 2 was released as a double album, consisting of two LP records titled Pescado and 2 (dos); and was intended to be listened as a whole, hence the tracks being listed from one to eighteenth. The first edition included a booklet with lyrics, photographs and drawings by Spinetta and his brother Gustavo.

The album is considered a classic of Argentine rock. In 2007, the Argentine edition of Rolling Stone ranked it nineteenth on its list of The 100 Greatest Albums of Argentine Rock.

American rapper Eminem sampled "Peteribí" in the song "Stepdad", off his 2020 album Music to Be Murdered By.

== Track listing ==
All tracks are written by Luis Alberto Spinetta, except where noted.

Pescado Side A
No.	Title	Writer(s)	Length
1.	"Panadero ensoñado"	Anonymous (Lebón, Spinetta)	0:37
2.	"Iniciado del alba"		3:09
3.	"Poseído del alba"		3:42
4.	"Como el viento voy a ver"		5:13
5.	"Viajero naciendo"		2:56
6.	"Mañana o pasado"	Lebón	2:39

Side B
No.	Title	Writer(s)	Length
7.	"Nena boba"		3:05
8.	"Madre-selva"		7:45
9.	"Peteribí" (also known as "Ámame peteribí")	Amaya, Cutaia, Spinetta	7:36

2 (dos) Side C
No.	Title	Writer(s)	Length
10.	"16 de peteribí"	Anonymous (Amaya, Cutaia, Spinetta)	0:15
11.	"Señorita"	Amaya, Cutaia, Lebón, Spinetta	1:32
12.	"Credulidad"		3:06
13.	"¡Hola, pequeño ser!"	Amaya, Cutaia, Spinetta	9:37
14.	"Mi espíritu se fué"	Frascino, Spinetta	4:27

Side D
No.	Title	Writer(s)	Length
15.	"Sombra de la noche negra"	Amaya	5:53
16.	"La cereza del Zar"		1:43
17.	"Corto"		1:40
18.	"Cristálida"		8:45
Total length:			73:40

== Personnel ==
Credits adapted from the liner notes of Pescado 2, except where otherwise noted.

- Luis Alberto Spinetta – guitar, vocals, bass, cover art
- David Lebón – bass, vocals, guitar
- Carlos Cutaia – organ, piano
- Black Amaya – drums, percussion
- Gustavo Spinetta – cover art
- Norberto Orliac – audio engineer
- Oscar López – recording coordination
- Viviana Rossi – back cover, photography

== See also ==
- 1973 in Argentina
- 1973 in music
- Cultural impact of the Beatles
- Music of Argentina
- Origins of Argentine rock
- Psychedelic era
- Psychedelic rock in Latin America
