= Avellaneda Blues =

Song by Manal

from the album Manal
- Language: Spanish
- Released: 1970
- Recorded: 1970
- Studio: TNT Studios in Buenos Aires
- Genre: Blues, jazz fusion
- Length: 5:37
- Label: Mandioca
- Songwriter(s): Claudio Gabis, Javier Martínez
- Producer(s): Jorge Álvarez, Pedro Pujo

"Avellaneda Blues" is a song by the Argentine blues rock band Manal. It is the fifth song of their 1970 self-titled album. It is an original blues song sung in Spanish. The work evokes images of a melancholic dawn in Avellaneda, a port and industrial suburb of Buenos Aires.

== Composition ==
The composition began when Claudio Gabis and Luis Gambolini were walking along the tracks of Avellaneda and Gerli. Inspired by the walk, Gabis composed a harmonic sequence and an initial draft of the lyrics. A few days later, in a party organized by Piri Lugones where the group met its producers Jorge Álvarez and Pedro Pujo, Gabis showed the chords and the draft to Javier Martínez, who composed the final lyrics. The group sang this song to Álvarez, who became convinced that he had to be their producer. The song is a form of blues, with a resolution that substitutes the dominant chord for a cadence that descends towards the tonic (chords bIII / II-7 / I), and a coda that is repeated at the end of each verse (chords I / II-7). The harmony and arrangement are similar to jazz. Sergio Pujol comments in his book Canciones Argentinas: "The melody of 'Avellaneda Blues' practically does not exist, it is just a musical channel conceived by Martinez while reading aloud its own letter."

== Recording ==
Like the other songs on Manal, "Avellaneda Blues" was recorded in 1970 at TNT Studios. The recording technician was Tim Croatto, former member of The TNT. The musicians were Javier Martínez on drums and vocal, Claudius Gabis on electric guitar and piano, and Alejandro Medina on electric bass. Jorge Álvarez and Pedro Pujo were the producers, with Salvador and Tim Croatto as the recording technicians.

== Publications ==
"Avellaneda Blues" was released on the acclaimed Manal album of 1970. Shortly after, it appeared as the opening song of the double compilation album Manal of 1973. Being a classic live performance, it was recorded several times. The first was Manal en Obras in 1982, then Manal en vivo in 1994 and En vivo en el Roxy in 1995, but the latter version without Claudio Gabis, and in Vivo en Red House of 2016, recorded in 2014.

== Reviews ==
In the list of the "100 best songs of the Argentine rock" by rock.com.ar website, "Avellaneda Blues" was ranked at No. 18.
