= Psychedelic rock in Latin America =

Psychedelic rock in Latin America is the psychedelic rock music scene in Latin America.

== Overview ==
=== Brazil and the Tropicalia movement ===
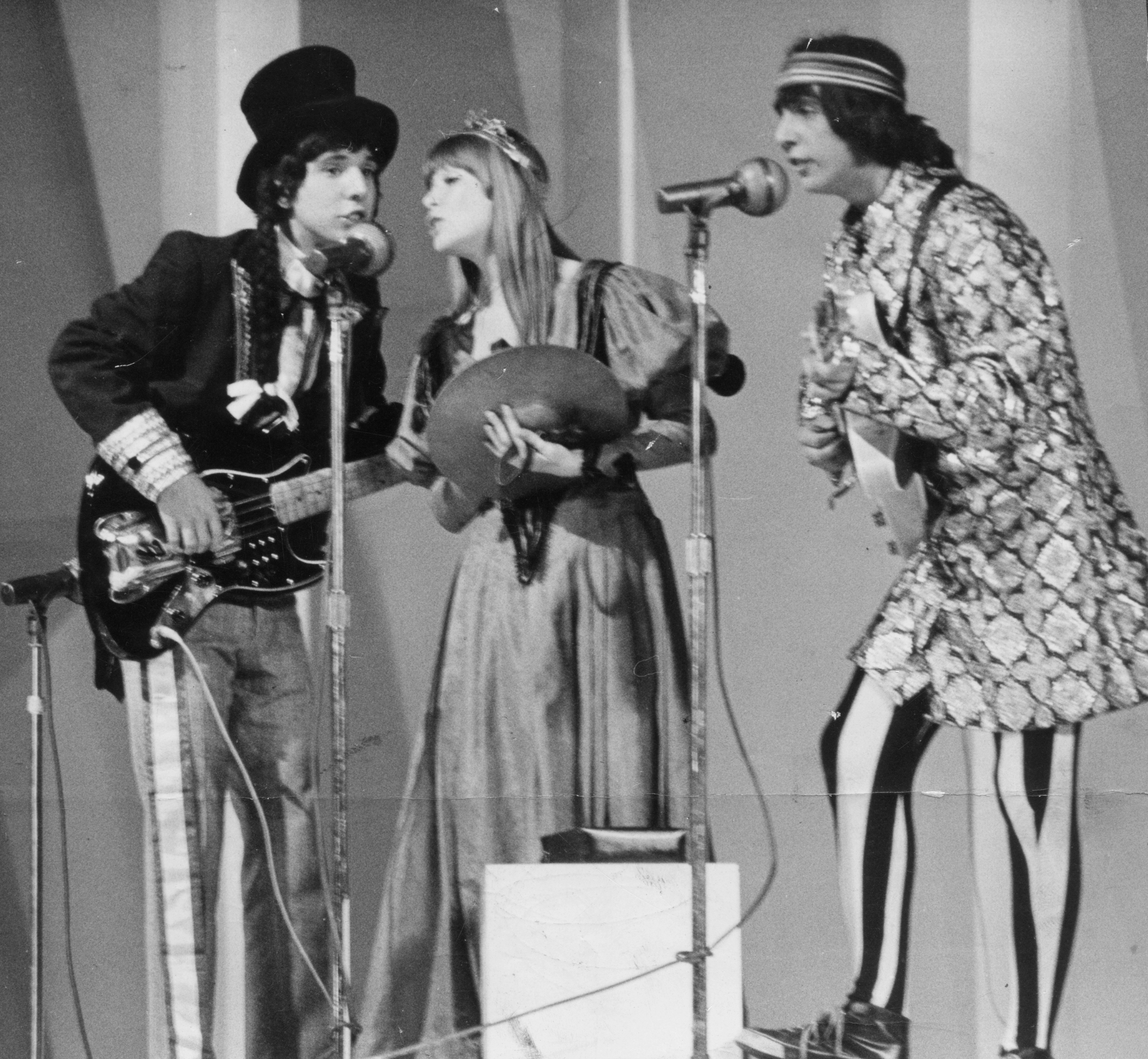
Os Mutantes performing in 1969.

Latin America proved a particularly fertile ground for psychedelic rock. The Brazilian psychedelic rock group Os Mutantes formed in 1966, although little known outside Brazil at the time (due to the fact that they recorded in Portuguese), they have since accrued a substantial international cult following. Os Mutantes also played a central role in the short-lived but revolutionary Brazilian aesthetic movement Tropicália, also known as 'Tropicalismo' (Tropicalism), an anti-authoritarian artistic reaction to the repressive military junta that seized power in Brazil in 1964. Encompassing visual art, theatre, poetry and music, Tropicália combined the popular and the avant-garde, and fused traditional Brazilian culture with foreign influences, including contemporary developments in British and American psychedelic music, and above all the music of The Beatles. As well as recording their own material, Os Mutantes collaborated with other key figures in the burgeoning Tropicalist movement, including singer-songwriter Gilberto Gil, whom they backed on Gil's second LP.

The musical manifesto of the Tropicalist movement was the landmark 1968 collaborative LP Tropicália: ou Panis et Circencis ("Tropicalia: or Bread and Circuses") which brought together the talents of Os Mutantes, Gilberto Gil, Caetano Veloso, Tom Zé and Gal Costa, with arrangements by avant-garde composer-arranger Rogerio Duprat (who had studied with Pierre Boulez) and lyrical contributions from poet Torquato Neto. The album's group cover photograph depicted the collective holding a variety of objects and images, in a deliberate reference to the cover of The Beatles' Sgt. Pepper's Lonely Hearts Club Band. The collective also performed a number of concert "happenings" which were intended to both involve and provoke audiences, and these reportedly had a similar effect on Brazilian audiences to that experienced by folk purists who witnessed Bob Dylan's early "electric" concerts – the performers sported long hair, wore outlandish psychedelic costumes, used electric guitars and amplification, and played at full volume. Brazil's military junta was becoming increasingly suspicious of the anarchic anti-establishment attitudes of the Tropicalistas, who also found themselves at odds with the nationalistic student left-wing, who favoured traditional Brazilian musical forms, and rejected what they saw as the corrupting influence of Western pop music.

In September 1968 Caetano Veloso gave two tumultuous performances at the third annual International Popular Song Festival in Rio, where the audience included a large contingent of left-wing students who were vehemently opposed to the Tropicalistas. When Veloso (backed by Os Mutantes) performed in the first round of the Festival's song competition on 12 September, he was initially greeted with enthusiastic applause, but the situation soon turned ugly. Dressed in a shiny green plastic suit, festooned with wires and necklaces strung with teeth, Veloso provoked the students with his sensual movements and startling new psychedelic music. He was bombarded by insults, jeers and boos from the students, who became even more incensed when American pop singer John Dandurand made a surprise appearance during the song. The ideological conflict climaxed three days later when Veloso returned for the second round of the competition on 15 September, at which he performed a new song entitled "Prohibido a Prohibir" ("It is Forbidden to Forbid"), which was recorded live and later released as single.

The students began hissing and booing as soon as Veloso's name was announced, and when he began his performance, his overtly sexual stage moves and the experimental music of Os Mutantes provoked an outpouring of anger – the audience began booing so loudly stood that Veloso could barely be heard, and a large number then stood and turned their backs on the performers, prompting Os Mutantes to turn their backs on the audience. As the song continued, the students pelted the stage with fruit, vegetables, eggs, paper balls and anything else that came hand. Veloso stopped playing and launched into a furious monologue, in which he excoriated the students for their conservatism. After being joined by Gilberto Gil, who came on stage to show his support, Veloso finished his diatribe by telling the students "... if you are the same in politics as you are in aesthetics, we’re done for!" and declaring he was withdrawing from the competition. He then deliberately finished the song out of tune, angrily shouted "Enough!" and walked off arm-in-arm with Gil and Os Mutantes.

Tropicália had a major effect on the Brazilian music scene during its brief heyday (1967–68), and the main performers made regular appearances on Brazilian stage, television and radio, but the movement was abruptly shut down in early 1969, following a provocative December 1968 TV performance which parodied the Brazilian national anthem. Gil and Veloso were both arrested in February 1969 on the orders of the military junta – they were held in prison for three months without charge or trial, and after a further four months under house arrest, they were released on condition that they leave the country, and they spent the next few years in exile in the UK. Others in the Tropicalist movement were treated even more harshly – several were arrested and tortured, or forced to undergo psychiatric 'treatment'.

=== Mexico, Chile and Argentina ===
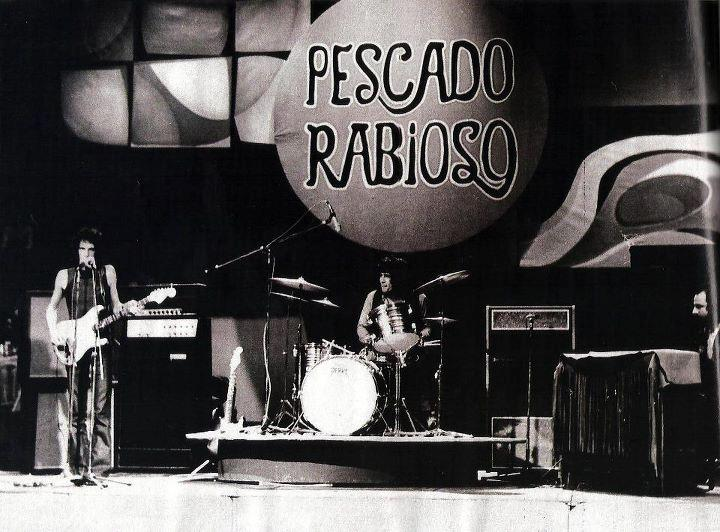
Pescado Rabioso performing in a TV show in Buenos Aires, 1972.

In the late 1960s, a wave of Mexican rock, heavily influenced by psychedelia and funk emerged, especially in northern border Mexican states, in particular, Tijuana, Baja California. Among the most recognized bands from this "Chicano Wave" (Onda Chicana in Spanish) were Three Souls in my Mind, Love Army, El Ritual and Los Dug Dug's. The Festival Rock y Ruedas de Avándaro was a historic Mexican rock festival held on September 11–12, 1971, on the shores of Lake Avándaro near the Avándaro Golf Club, in the central State of Mexico. The festival, took place at the height of La Onda and celebrated life, youth, ecology, music, peace and free love, has been compared to the American Woodstock festival for its psychedelic music, counterculture imagery and artwork, and open drug use.

In Chile from 1967 to 1973, between the ending of the government of President Frei Montalva and the government of President Allende, a cultural movement was born from a few Chilean bands that emerged playing a unique fusion of folkloric music with heavy psychedelic influences. The 1967 release of Los Mac's album Kaleidoscope Men (1967) inspired bands such as Los Jaivas and Los Blops, the latter going on to collaborate with the iconic Chilean singer-songwriter Victor Jara on his 1971 album El derecho de vivir en paz. Also Aguaturbia produced psychedelic rock within the Chilean late 60s early 70s context with a female vocalist Denise Corales. Piedra Roja was a music festival in Chile noted as an expression of the hippie counterculture in South America. I was held between 10 and 12 October 1970 in the eastern area of Santiago. Among others Aguaturbia, Los Blops, Lágrima Seca and Los Jaivas played in the festival. Meanwhile, in the Argentinian capital Buenos Aires, a burgeoning psychedelic scene gave birth to three of the most important bands in Argentine rock: Los Gatos, Manal and Almendra.
