= Eduardo Gatti =

Chilean singer-songwriter

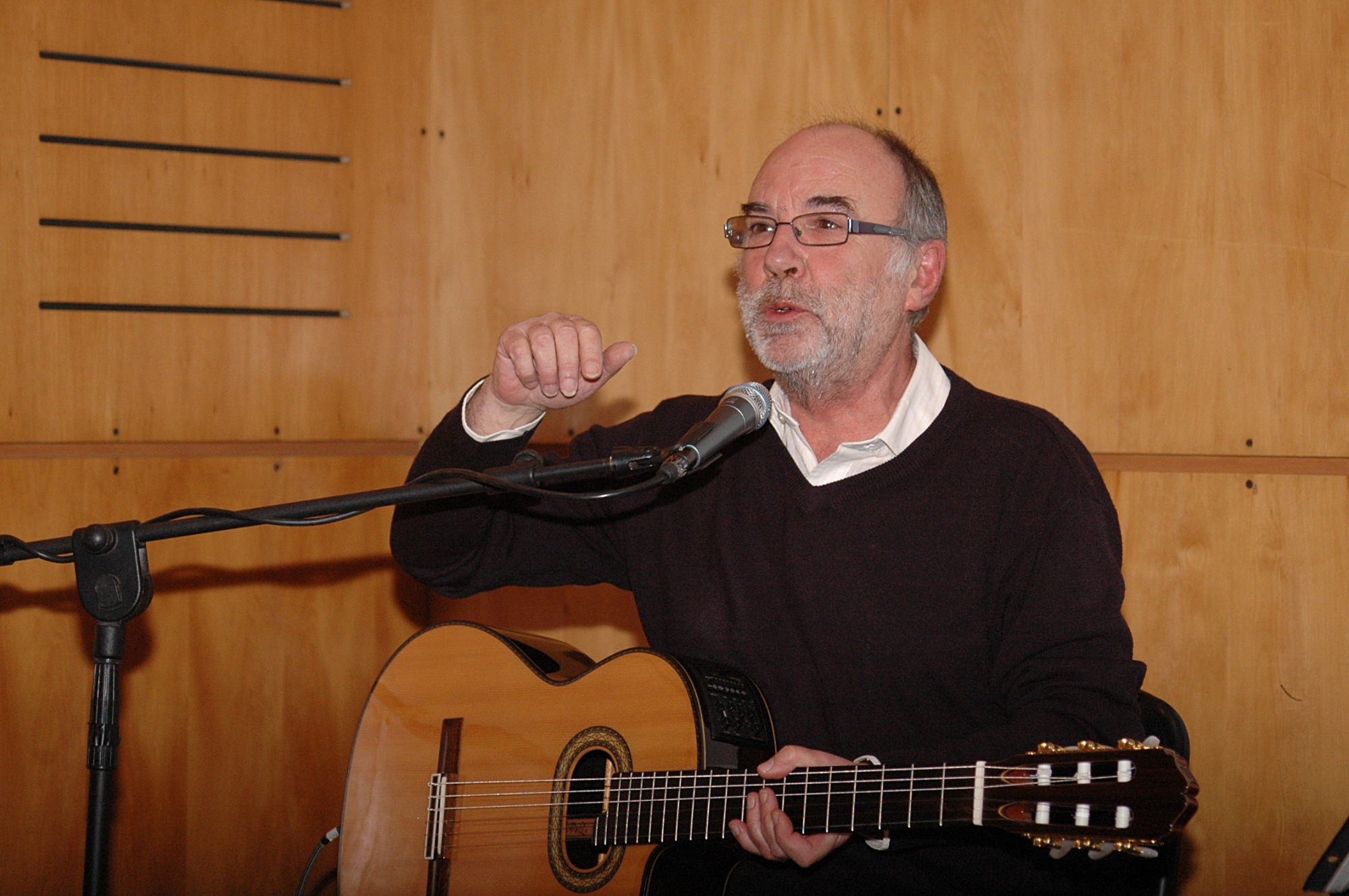
Eduardo Gatti

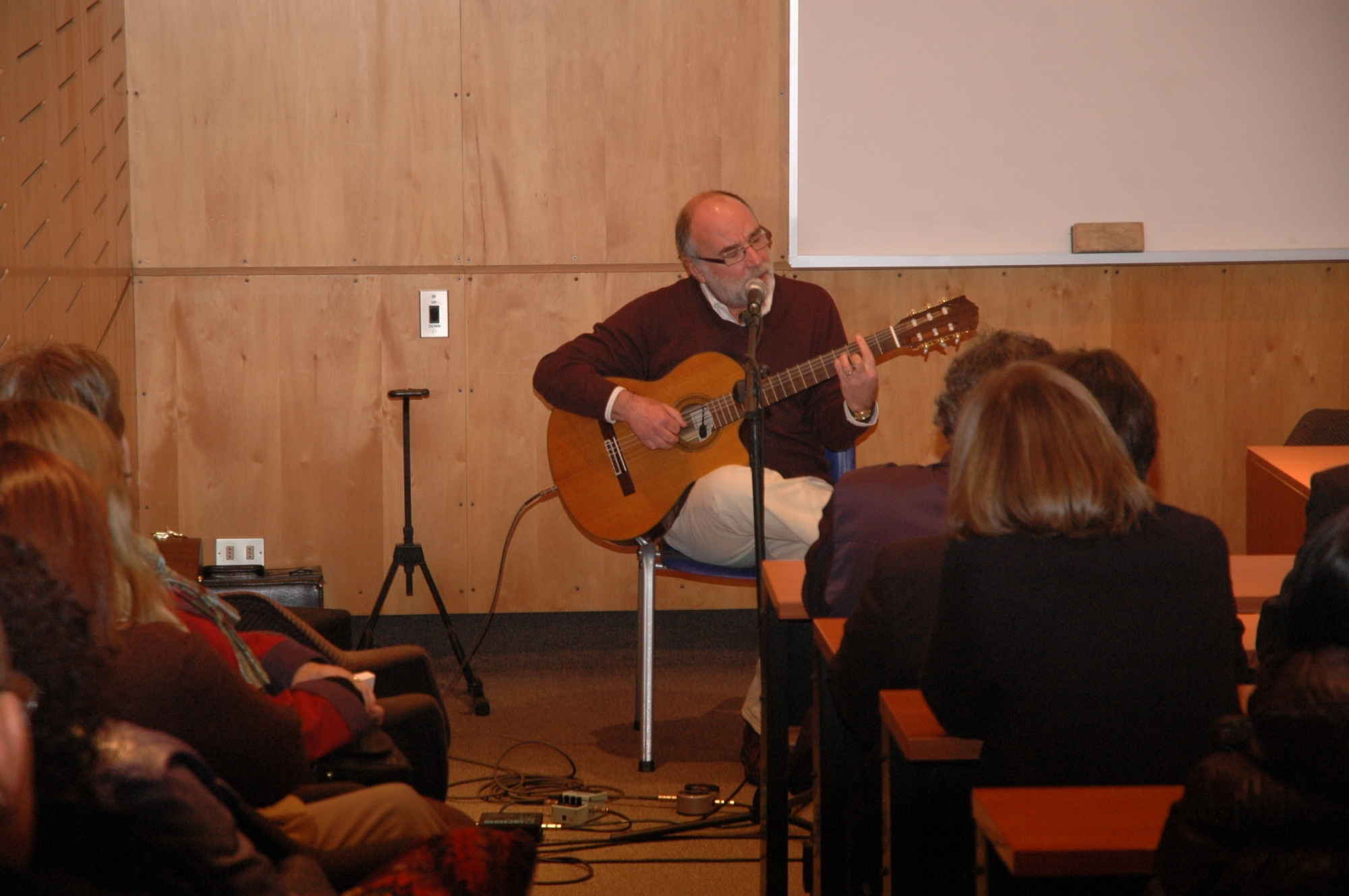
Eduardo Gatti

Eduardo Gatti Benoit (born 1949) is a Chilean singer-songwriter in the tradition of Nueva Canción and Nueva Trova. His best-known song is "Los Momentos" (The Moments), originally recorded in 1970 by Gatti when he was a member of the band Los Blops.
