= Piedra Roja (festival) =

Music festival in Chile

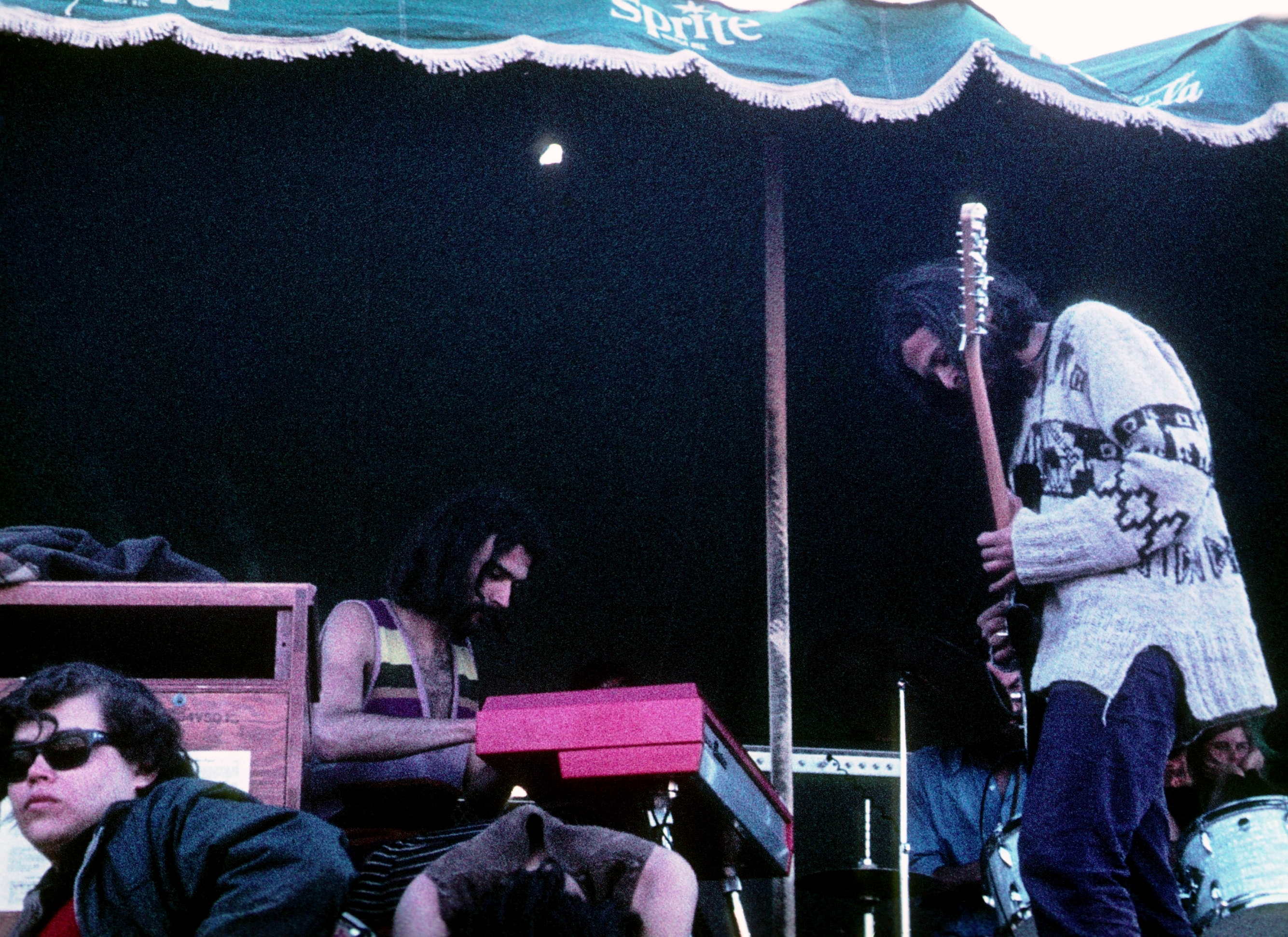
- Los Jaivas in Piedro Roja, c.1970
- Genre: Rock music
- Dates: 10 - 12 October 1970
- Locations: Santiago, Chile
- Years active: 1970

Piedra Roja was a music festival in Chile noted as an expression of the hippie counterculture in South America. Following the success of Woodstock, a similar music festival was held in Chile between 10 and 12 October 1970 in the eastern area of Santiago. Among others, the following bands performed in the festival: Aguaturbia, Los Blops, Lágrima Seca and Los Jaivas. Similarly to Woodstock, chaos marked the festival, involving problems with sound, drugs and delinquency. The festival showed for the first time that the young population in Chile during that time was a group to reckon with. It also showed the increasing social tension that would end in the 1973 Chilean coup d'état.

The festival was organized by Jorge Gómez Ainslie and is the topic of the first chapter of Psychedelic Chile: youth, counterculture, and politics on the road to socialism and dictatorship. Jorge was interviewed about the festival for the Duolingo Spanish Podcast.

== See also ==
- List of historic rock festivals
