= Los Blops =

Chilean band

- Origin: Chile
- Genres: Folk; progressive rock; psychedelic rock; progressive folk
- Years active: 1964–1974, 1978–1981, 2001–2003
- Labels: Discoteca del Cantar Popular; Peña de los Parra; Alba
- Past members: Original Members: Julio Villalobos; Eduardo Gatti; Juan Pablo Orrego; Juan Contreras; Sergio Bezard; Other Members: Alejandro Greene; Pedro Greene; Felipe Orrego; Andrés Orrego; Juan Agustín Jiménez; Héctor Sepúlveda; Juan Carlos Villegas; Carlos Fernández; Jaime Labarca; Andrés Pollak

Los Blops were a Chilean folk and rock band, regarded as one of the foremost bands in the country.

The band originally formed in the town of Isla Negra in 1964 to perform cover versions of pop hits in local clubs. They took their name from a popular comic strip, Condorito. The original band members were Julio Villalobos (guitar, vocals), Alejandro Greene (guitar) and Pedro Greene (drums). After Alejandro Greene left in 1966, the remaining pair were joined by Felipe Orrego (guitar) and his cousins Juan Pablo Orrego (bass) and Andrés Orrego (vocals). In 1969, Felipe and Andrés Orrego left, shortly followed by Pedro Greene, and the classic band line-up formed, consisting of Julio Villalobos (guitar), Juan Pablo Orrego (bass), and new members Eduardo Gatti (guitar, vocals), Juan Contreras (keyboards, flute), and Sergio Bezard (drums).

They performed versions of songs by such bands as The Rolling Stones and Cream, and also incorporated elements of Chilean folk music and increasingly performed their own compositions. The band members lived communally in Santiago, together with several members of the Instituto Arica de Santiago. Their first LP, mainly of instrumentals, was recorded in 1970, in 12 hours on a two-track machine and produced by DICAP (Discoteca Del Cantar Popular). It included the hit single "Los Momentos."

Villalobos left in 1972 and was replaced by pianist Juan Carlos Villegas. The band recorded two more albums, Del volar de las palomas ("The flying of doves", 1972), and Locomotora ("Locomotive", 1973), before splitting up in 1974 following the coup led by Augusto Pinochet. Gatti and Orrego later reformed Los Blops in 1978, recording a single, "Los Momentos"/ "La Francisca," but they split again in 1980. They briefly reunited once again in 2001.

== Discography ==
- Blops (1970)
- Blops (1971)
- Blops (1974)
- Iquique (1979)
