= Juan Pablo Orrego =

Chilean environmentalist (born 1949)

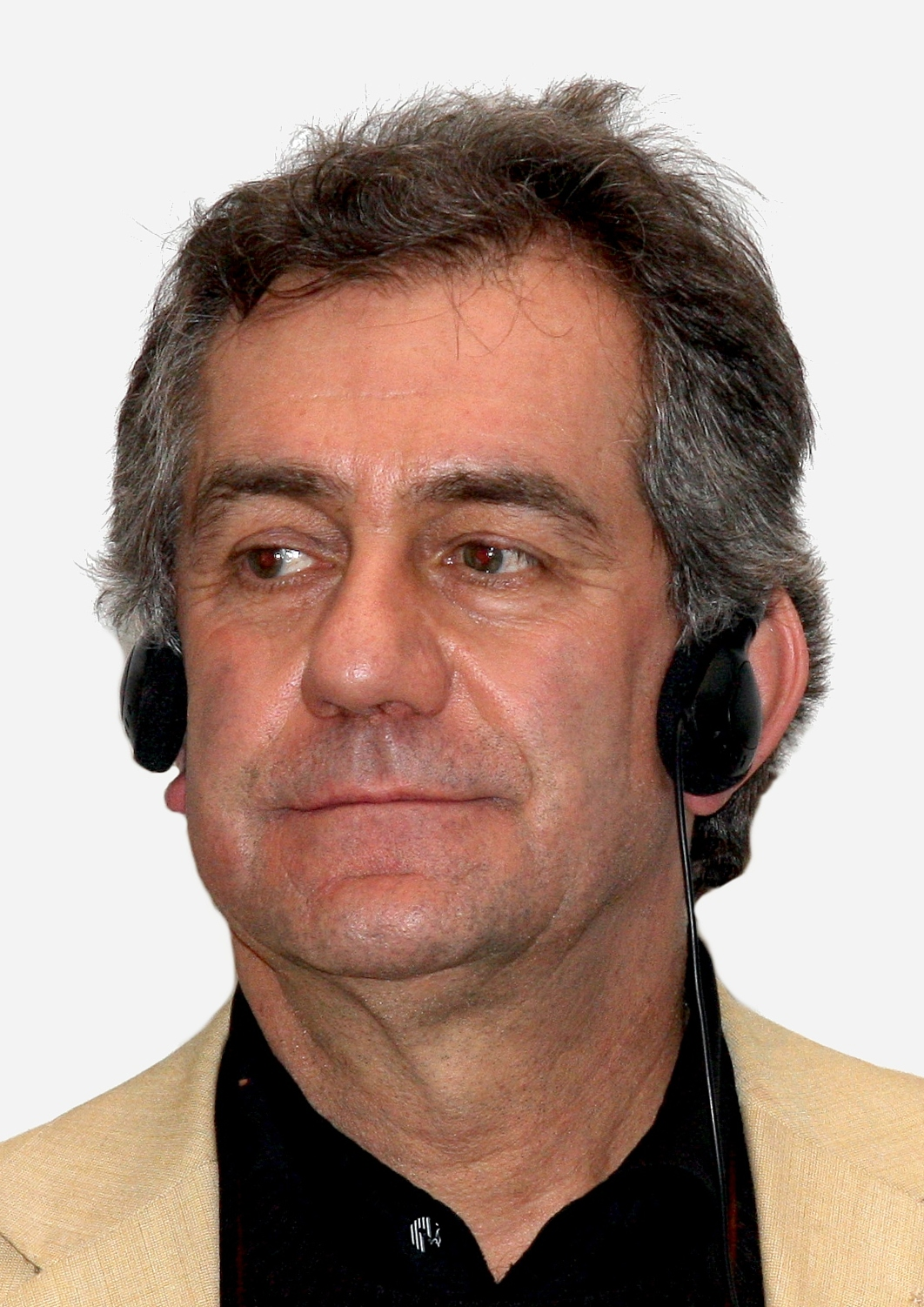
- Orrego in 2010
- Born: 1949 (age 76–77)
- Occupations: ecologist and musician
- Awards: Goldman Environmental Prize (1997); Right Livelihood Award (1998)

Juan Pablo Orrego is a Chilean ecologist, musician and environmentalist. He is the current president of the Ecosistemas (NGO). He is one of the most influential environmental voices in Chile, and Latin America as consequence of his important participation in campaigns against damming projects in Chile that threatened local communities and valuable ecosystems. In 1998, he was awarded the Right Livelihood Award "for his personal courage, self-sacrifice and perseverance in working for sustainable development in Chile."

== Biography ==
During the 1990s, he was president of the activist group Grupo de Acción por el Biobío, which represents the indigenous Pehuenche people in the Biobío Region. He was awarded the Goldman Environmental Prize in 1997, for his organizing of protests against the ecological damages from a series of dam building projects involving the Biobío River, including the Pangue and Ralco Hydroelectric Plants.

== Awards and honours ==
- THE RIGHT LIVELIHOOD AWARDS 1998.
