= Jorge Álvarez (producer) =

Argentinian record producer

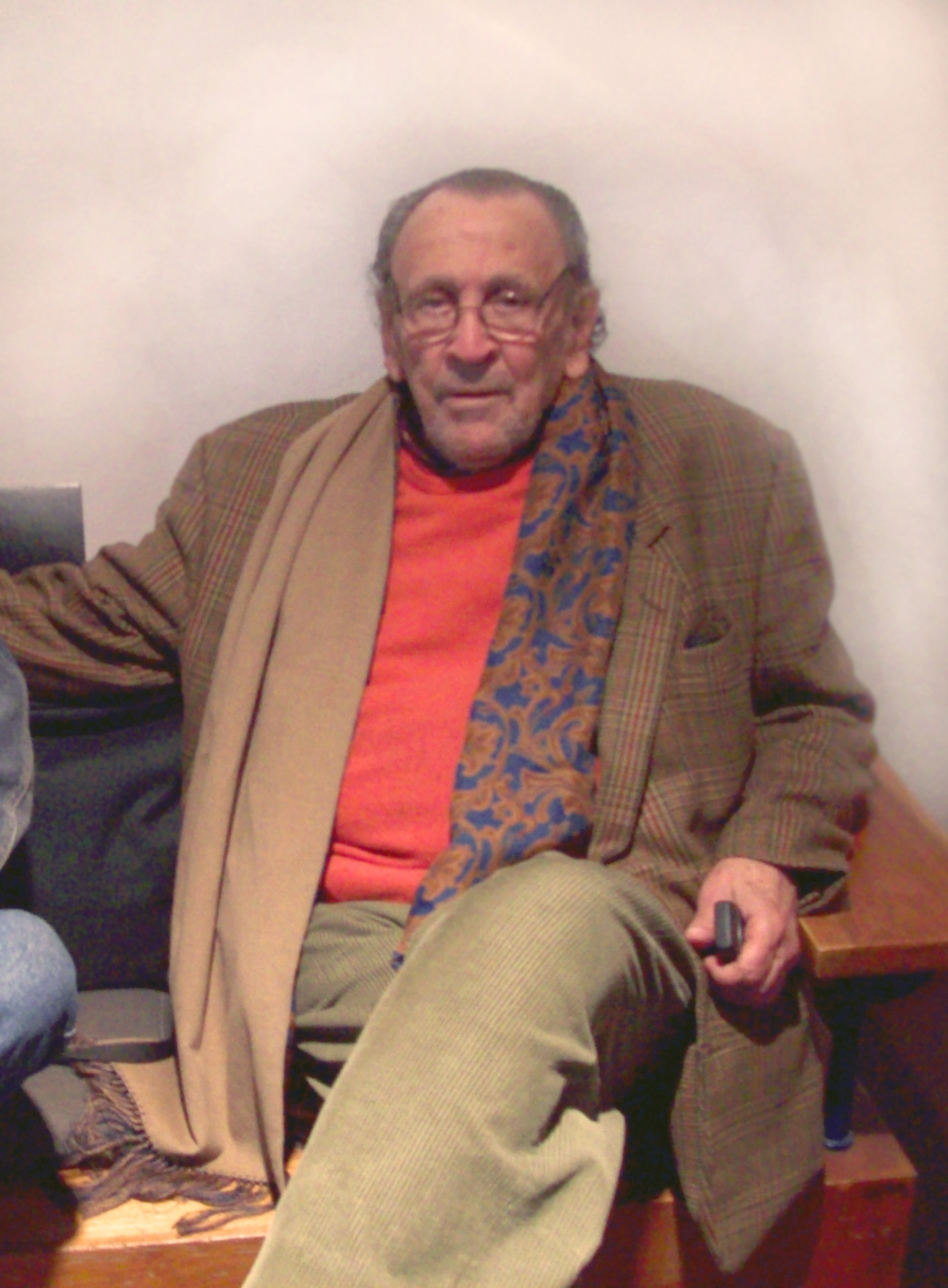
- Jorge Álvarez in 2012
- Born: 1932; Buenos Aires, Argentina
- Died: July 5, 2015 (aged 83); Buenos Aires, Argentina
- Occupations: Publisher; record producer
- Years active: 1963-2015
- Known for: Promoter of Argentine rock and literature in the 1960s and 1970s

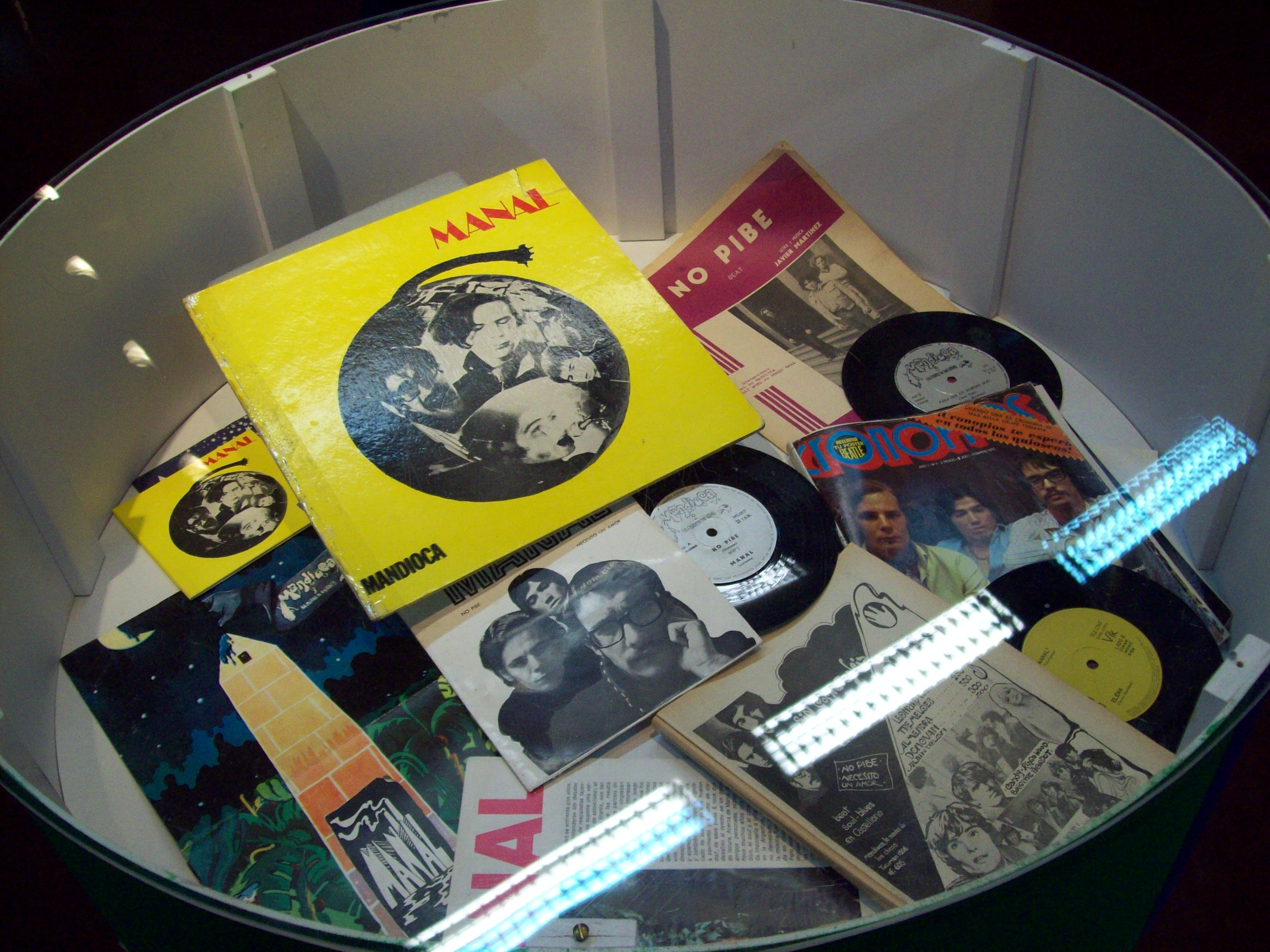
The first album and some singles by Manal, exhibition Pidamos peras a Jorge Álvarez, at the National Library

Jorge Álvarez (1932 – July 5, 2015) was an Argentine publisher and record producer, considered one of the most important promoters of Argentine culture in the 1960s and 1970s, first in the world of literature and later in the world of music.

== Biography ==
In 1963, he founded the publishing house Editorial Jorge Álvarez and later Ediciones de la Flor, from which he released the work of writers like Rodolfo Walsh, Ricardo Piglia, Manuel Puig, Joaquín Lavado, David Viñas, Marta Lynch, Leopoldo Torre Nilsson and Juan José Saer, as well as the Mafalda comic strip by cartoonist Quino. Between 1963 and 1968, he published around three hundred books that marked "a milestone in Argentine and Latin American literature."

In 1968 he founded the independent record label Mandioca, nicknamed "the kids' mother", which was a great promoter for the burgeoning Spanish-language rock movement. Through this platform, he produced influential Argentine rock artists such as Manal, Miguel Abuelo, Moris, Vox Dei, Alma y Vida and Tanguito, among others. Later, through the Music Hall and Talent-Microfón labels, he worked with Pescado Rabioso, Sui Generis, Invisible, Color Humano, La Cofradía de la Flor Solar and Billy Bond.

In 1971, he acted in Edgardo Cozarinsky's 1971 film Puntos suspensivos o Esperando a los bárbaros. Due to the civil-military dictatorship—which warned him that he was "creating a revolutionary youth"— Álvarez had to go into exile in Madrid in 1977, where he produced Spanish artists such as Antonio Flores, Mecano, Olé Olé, Marta Sánchez and Joaquín Sabina. In 2011 he returned to Argentina and in 2013 he published his memoirs.

He died on July 5, 2015, and a wake took place at the National Library of the Argentine Republic in Buenos Aires.

== See also ==
- Origins of Argentine rock
- Psychedelic rock in Latin America
