= Pescado Rabioso =

1970s Argentine rock band

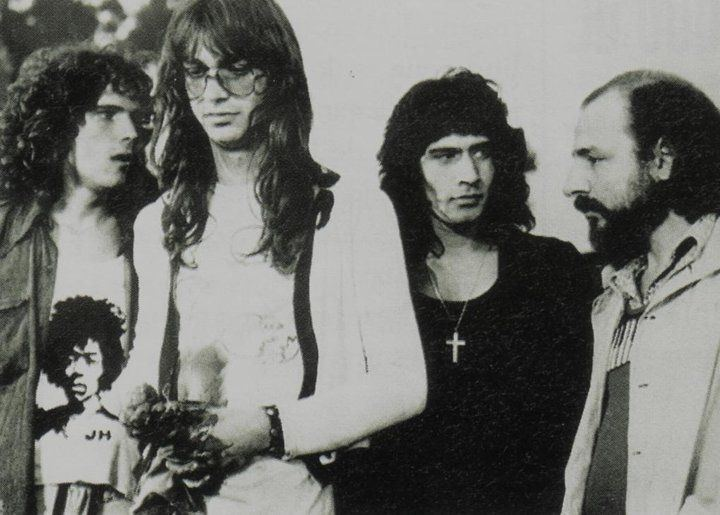
- Pescado Rabioso circa 1973. From left to right: Luis Alberto Spinetta, David Lebón, Black Amaya and Carlos Cutaia.

Background information
- Origin: Buenos Aires, Argentina
- Genres: Blues rock, hard rock, psychedelic rock, folk rock
- Years active: 1971–1973; 2009
- Label: Talent-Microfón
- Past members: Luis Alberto Spinetta; Black Amaya; Carlos Cutaia; David Lebón; Osvaldo "Bocón" Frascino

Pescado Rabioso (Rabid Fish, pronounced [pesˈkaðo raˈβjoso]) was an Argentine band led by musician Luis Alberto Spinetta, from 1971 to 1973. Initially a trio accompanied by drummer Black Amaya and bassist Osvaldo "Bocón" Frascino, it became a quartet with the addition of keyboardist Carlos Cutaia. Finally, David Lebón replaced Frascino in 1972 and featured on the album Pescado 2.

In spite of its short life, Pescado Rabioso is still considered an important and influential piece of Argentine rock history. It was the second major band of Spinetta, created after Almendra's break up in the late 1960s and a seven-month trip through Brazil, United States and Europe.

Although labeled under the band's name due to legal terms with his record company, Pescado Rabioso's final album Artaud is actually a complete solo effort from Spinetta.

== Discography ==
=== Studio albums ===
- Desatormentándonos (1972)
- Pescado 2 (1973)
- Artaud (1973)

=== Compilation albums ===
- Lo mejor de Pescado Rabioso (1976)
- Obras cumbres (2000)

=== Singles ===
- "Post-crucifixión" / "Despiértate nena" (1972)
- "Me gusta ese tajo" / "Credulidad" (1973)
- "Todas las hojas son del viento" / "Superchería" (1973)

== Filmography ==
- Hasta que se ponga el sol (1973)
- Pescado Rabioso, una utopía incurable (2012)
