= Manal =

Argentine rock group

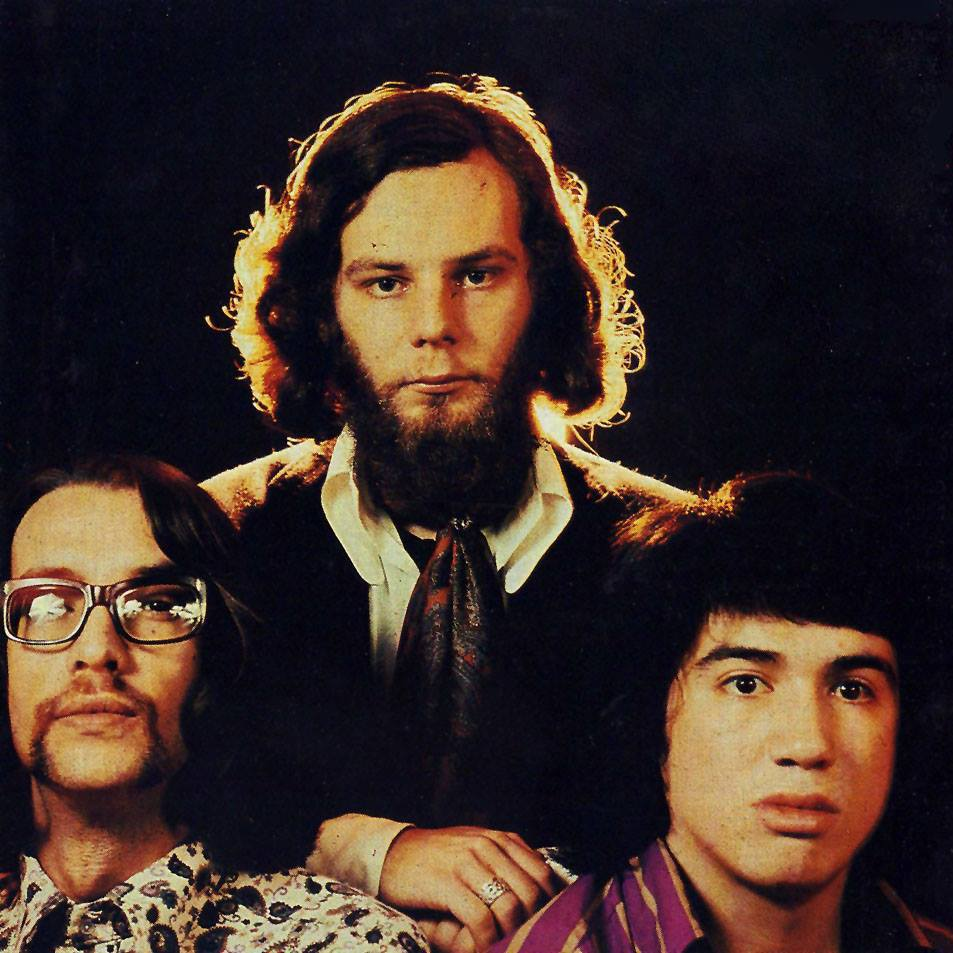
- Manal in 1970

Background information
- Origin: Buenos Aires, Argentina
- Genres: Argentine rock, rock, blues rock, hard rock, jazz fusion
- Years active: 1968–1971, 1980–1981, 1986–1987
- Labels: Mandioca, RCA, CBS
- Past members: Javier Martínez; Claudio Gabis; Alejandro Medina

Manal was an Argentine rock group formed in 1968. Together with Almendra and Los Gatos, they are considered founders of Argentine rock. The band members were Claudio Gabis on guitar, Javier Martínez on drums and vocals, and Alejandro Medina on bass and vocals. Martínez was the band's lead vocalist and leading songwriter.

== Trajectory ==
=== 1968–1969: Formation ===
The band grew out of the mythic "La Cueva" club. Martínez was a regular, and Gabis played guitar with several bands, including Miguel Abuelo's Los Abuelos. Gabis was not keen on joining a band regularly as he was committed to college, but eventually was persuaded by Martínez, and Manal was born.

The name "Manal" was based on the word mano ("hand"), which had acquired an additional meaning among young people in Buenos Aires, to refer to "things" or "the situation" (e.g. cómo viene la mano, lit. "how's the hand coming", would mean "how are things going"). Martínez would use "manal" as a made-up adjective, instead of the standard "manual".

Manal was influenced by The Beatles, Cream, Jimi Hendrix, The Animals and other blues rock acts, bringing the blues to Argentina's rock conscience.

In 1968, after their demos being rejected by multiple record labels, the band approached long time friend and producer Jorge Álvarez, who teamed up with Pedro Pujó and created the Mandioca label, which became the first label exclusively dedicated to Argentine rock.

Under the fledgling label, Manal released their first two singles in 1968. Their moment of triumph came at the 1969 Pinap Festival. On the back of their near daily performances throughout the year, the group's tightness was apparent. Fans ended up doing choruses and singing along with Manal's three members, who had resorted to a cappella vocals as their bass and drums broke down from overuse.

=== 1970–1972: Breakthrough Success and Break-Up ===
Manal released a self-titled debut album in 1970. Sales were encouraging, prompting RCA to offer the band a contract. Their major label debut El León (1971) proved less successful than Manal.

By 1972 however, musical tastes had changed. Acoustic rock (with folk-rock influences) was on the verge of an explosion fueled by artists such as León Gieco, and a heavier rock had become dominant. Blues-rock fell out of favor, and Manal couldn't make the transition. Their third album in 1972 was poorly received, leading to the break-up of the band that same year. Pappo, who was more at ease courting heavy metal audiences, would become the godfather of Argentine blues, a role he kept for over thirty years.

=== 1980–1981: Reunion ===
However, in 1980, Argentine rock was caught up in a revival period of rock from the late 1960s, with Almendra successfully reuniting. Producers asked Manal to do the same, which they did, and produced one last LP in 1981, named Reunión (reunion), but due to differences between Martinez and Gabis the meeting lasted only until 1981. After that meeting, Claudio Gabis not accept return to play again with Javier Martinez.

Manal's well-attended last concerts across Argentina led to a live album, and helped mitigate the unfortunate climate of their first separation. Furthermore, during the 1982 Falklands War, English-language music was informally banned from the airwaves for several months, resulting in increased airplay for Argentine bands, including Manal.

=== 1987–1994: Reformations without Claudio Gabis ===
In 1987 Javier Martínez returned from France and reunited Manal with Aldo Giacommino (guitars), Luis de León (bass), Jorge Iacobellis (drums) and Jorge Szajko (keyboards and saxophone).

Today, Manal are credited with bringing the grittier form of blues-rock to Argentine rock. Few at the time could have foreseen the strong influence Manal would have on the suburban rock explosion of the mid 1990s.

Throughout their career, Manal's lyrics suggested a more mature outlook on life than their hippie-influenced colleagues. One song advised that the recipe for success was to have "cold tomato juice (flowing) in your veins".

== Discography ==
Studio

- Manal - Mandioca, 1970
- El león - RCA, 1971
- Reunión - CBS, 1981

Live albums

- Manal en Obras - (Live at the Estadio Obras Sanitarias, June 1980) Tonodisc, 1982
- Manal En Vivo - (Live at the Estadio Obras Sanitarias, June 1980) M&M, 1994
- En vivo en el Roxy - (Live at the Roxy but without Claudio Gabis, August 1994), 1995

Compilation

- Cronología - RCA, Sony BMG, 1992
- Obras Cumbres - Sony BMG, 2002
