= Taiwanese wave =

Cultural phenomenon

Taiwanese wave (traditional Chinese: 臺流; pinyin: Táiliú; Japanese: 台流; rōmaji: Tairyū) is a neologism originally coined in Japan to refer to the increase in the popularity of Taiwanese popular culture in the country (including: actors, dramas, music, fashion, films), and to distinguish it from the Korean wave (Korean: 한류; RR: Hallyu) co-existing in Japan. Many Taiwanese dramas, songs as well as idol actors, singers, bands or groups have become popular throughout East Asia and Southeast Asia.

== History ==
The Four Asian Tigers

Towards the turn of the 21st century, there was a noticeable growth in cultural imports from Taiwan, one of the Four Asian Tigers. The spread of Taiwanese popular culture occurred before the Korean wave was known in Asia.

In 2001, the Taiwanese drama Meteor Garden (an adaptation of the Japanese manga series Boys Over Flowers by Yoko Kamio) was released and soon attracted audiences from all over the region. It became the most-watched drama series in Philippine television history, garnered over 10 million daily viewers in Manila alone, and catapulted the male protagonists from the Taiwanese boyband F4 to overnight fame. Their popularity spread throughout Asia, including China, Hong Kong, Singapore, Malaysia, Thailand, Indonesia, Japan, South Korea, Vietnam and the Philippines. With their success, many other Taiwanese boy bands emerged around this time, such as 5566, 183 Club and Fahrenheit. In 2002, a BBC journalist described the members of F4 as previously unknown actors who have "provoked hysteria across Asia" as a result of the success of Meteor Garden.

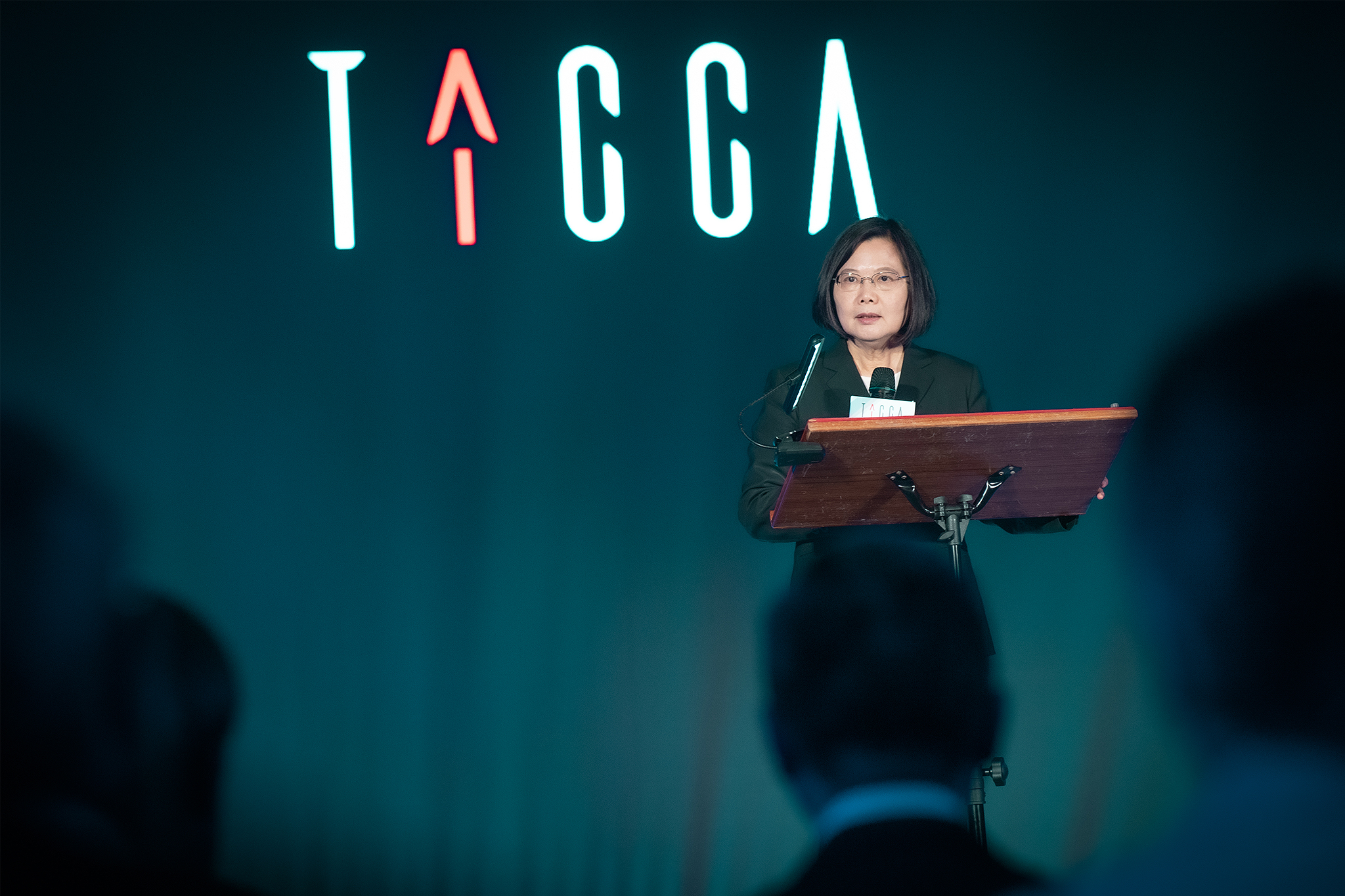
At the launch of the Taiwan Creative Content Agency (文化內容策進院) on 8 November 2019, President Tsai Ing-wen said that "A Taiwanese cultural wave should set the world alight", and the agency should form a bridge between government and the private sector, support creatives, foster cultural development, and help the world see the country’s creative content.

The popularity of "Meteor Garden" can be attributed to the explicit attention to female sexual desires—departing from conventional dramas that tend to eroticize the female body, "Meteor Garden" markets the sexual attraction of the male actors (as played out by the Taiwanese idol group F4), giving women a certain freedom of sexual expression.

Since 2002, television programming trends in Southeast Asia began to undergo a drastic change as TV series from Taiwan filled the slot originally reserved for Hollywood movies during prime time. Much of Asia still have their eyes focused on Taiwanese bands such as F4, S.H.E and Fahrenheit.

== List of groups ==
Boy groups

- 2moro
- 183 Club
- 5566
- Awaking (duo)
- B. A. D.
- Choc7
- Comic Boyz
- Cool Silly
- Eastyle
- Energy (Taiwanese band)
- F4 (band)
- Fahrenheit (Taiwanese band)
- JPM (band)
- L.A. Boyz
- Lollipop F
- New Formosa Band
- K One
- SpeXial
- Superband (band)
- Tension (Taiwanese band)
- W0LF(S)
- Wu Hu Jiang (band)
- Xiao Hu Dui

Girl groups

- 4 in Love (group)
- TPE48
- Beauty4
- Dears (band)
- Dream Girls (band)
- Frances & Aiko
- Hey Girl (group)
- I.n.g
- Ice Creamusume
- Popu Lady
- S.H.E
- Sweety
- Walkie Talkie (band)
- Weather Girls

== Popularity ==
=== In Japan ===
K-pop is one of two popular trends occurring in Japan, the other being Taiwanese pop (sung in Mandarin Chinese). This phenomenon is called 台流 (pronounced Tairyū) in Japanese, which literally means the influx of Taiwanese pop culture in Japan. This trend has been prevalent in Japan for at least twenty years, with Taiwanese idol dramas like Meteor Garden, It Started with a Kiss, Hot Shot, and soon Autumn's Concerto making waves in Japan, and Japanese artists like Gackt making frequent visits to Taiwan for pleasure.

Up to now, Taiwanese male singer Show Lo has been regarded as leading the Taiwanese wave in Japan. On 15 February 2012, he made his foray into the Japanese music scene, with the release of his first Japanese single Dante. The single peaked at number 10 on the Oricon chart within the first week of its release. He is the second Taiwanese singer to make it into the Oricon chart in the past 25 years after the veteran singer Teresa Teng, and the first Taiwanese male singer to make it into the top 10 positions on the chart.

=== In Vietnam ===
At the end of 2010, Hoa Học Trò Magazine proclaimed a list of the top 5 C-pop boybands of the 2000s decade, all are from Taiwan. They are: F4, 183 Club, 5566, Fahrenheit (Fei Lun Hai), and Lollipop (Bang Bang Tang).

== See also ==
- Golden Melody Awards
- List of best-selling albums in Taiwan
- Taiwanese culture
  - C-pop
  - Hokkien pop
  - Mandopop
  - Taiwanese drama
  - Taiwanese hip hop
  - Taiwanese rock
  - Cinema of Taiwan
- Taiwan Miracle
- Fashion in Taiwan
- Korean wave
  - Culture of South Korea
  - Kpop
  - Korean drama
- British Invasion
- Uruguayan Invasion
- Pro-Taiwanese sentiment
