= 1960s in music =

This article includes an overview of the events and trends in popular music in the 1960s.

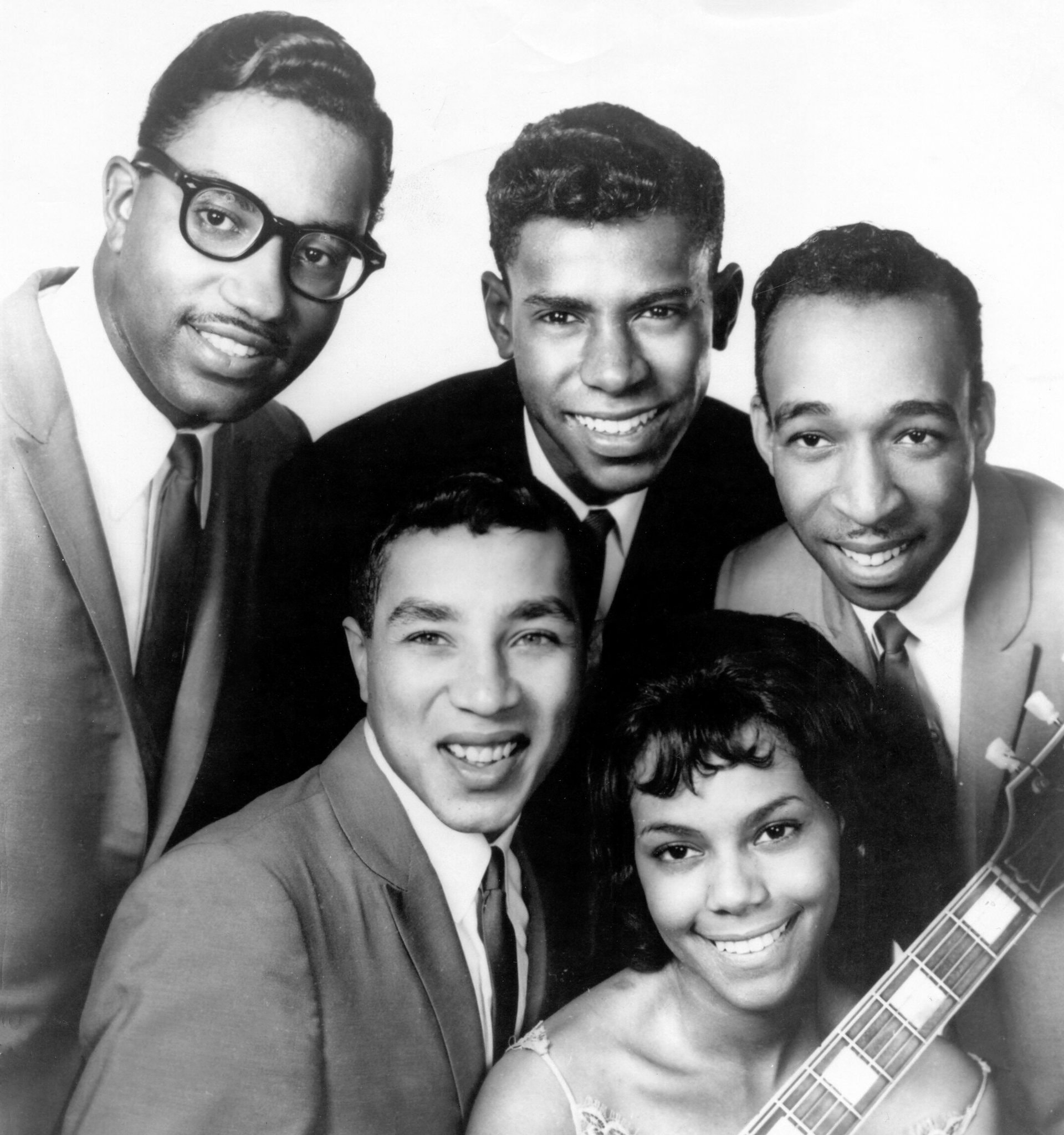
The Miracles pictured in 1962. Known as Motown's "soul supergroup", The Miracles were one of the first commercially successful acts of the 1960s and propelled both Motown and its Tamla label to international fame.

In North America and Europe the decade was particularly revolutionary in terms of popular music, continuing the shift away from traditional pop that began in the 1950s. The 1960s saw the evolution of rock and the beginnings of the album era. At the beginning of the 1960s, pop and rock and roll trends of the 1950s continued; nevertheless, the rock and roll of the decade before started to merge into a more international, electric variant. In the mid-1960s, rock and roll in its purest form was gradually overtaken by pop rock, beat, psychedelic rock, blues rock, and folk rock, which had grown in popularity. The country- and folk-influenced style associated with the latter half of 1960s rock music spawned a generation of popular singer-songwriters who wrote and performed their own work. Towards the decade's end, genres such as Baroque pop, sunshine pop, bubble gum pop, and progressive rock started to grow popular, with the latter two finding greater success in the following decade. Furthermore, the 1960s saw funk and soul music rising in popularity; rhythm and blues in general remained popular. The fusion of R&B, gospel, and original rock and roll was a success until the mid-part of the decade. Aside from the popularity of rock and R&B music in the 1960s, Latin American as well as Jamaican and Cuban music achieved a degree of popularity throughout the decade, with genres such as bossa nova, the cha-cha-cha, ska, and calypso being popular. From a classical point of view, the 1960s were also an important decade as they saw the development of electronic, experimental, jazz and contemporary classical music, notably minimalism and free improvisation.

In Asia, various trends marked the popular music of the 1960s. In Japan, the decade saw the rise in popularity of several Western popular music groups such as The Beatles and the Rolling Stones. The success of rock music and bands in Japan started a new genre, known as Group Sounds, which was popular in the latter half of the decade.

In South America, genres such as bossa nova, Nueva canción and Nueva ola started to rise. Rock music began leaving its mark, and achieved success in the 1960s. Additionally, salsa grew popular towards the end of the decade. In the 1960s cumbia entered Chile and left a long-lasting impact on tropical music in that country.

== United Kingdom ==
=== Beat music and the British Invasion ===
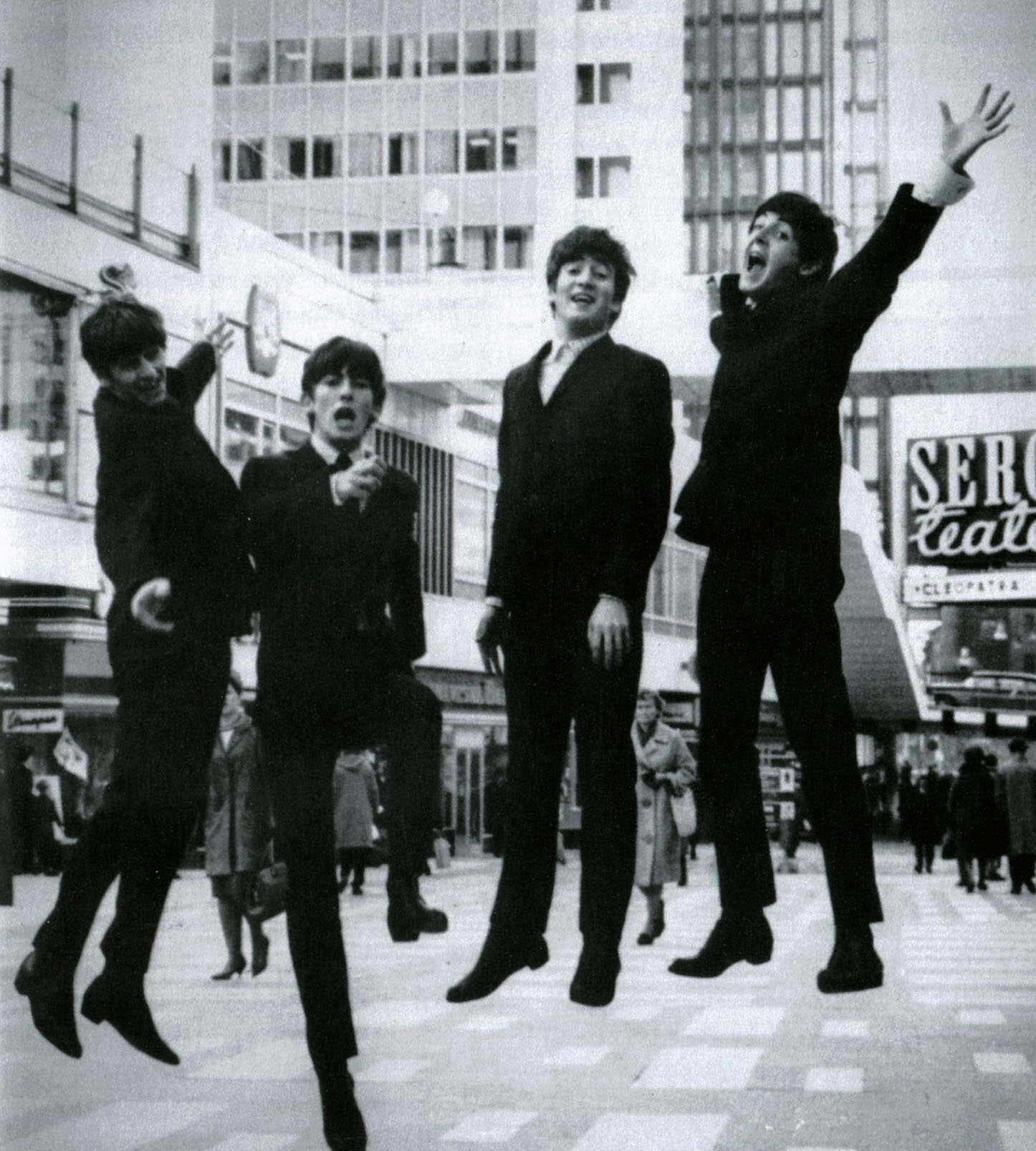
The arrival of the Beatles in the U.S., and subsequent appearance on The Ed Sullivan Show, marked the start of the British Invasion in which a large number of rock and roll, beat and pop performers from Britain gained massive popularity in the U.S.

In the late 1950s, a flourishing culture of groups began to emerge, often out of the declining skiffle scene, in major urban centres in the UK like Liverpool, Manchester, Birmingham and London. This was particularly true in Liverpool, where it has been estimated that there were around 350 different bands active, often playing ballrooms, concert halls and clubs. Beat bands were heavily influenced by American bands of the era, such as Buddy Holly and the Crickets (from which group the Beatles derived their name), as well as earlier British groups such as the Shadows. After the national success of the Beatles in Britain from 1962, a number of Liverpool performers were able to follow them into the charts, including Cilla Black, Gerry and the Pacemakers and the Searchers. Among the most successful beat acts from Birmingham were the Spencer Davis Group and the Moody Blues. From London, the term Tottenham Sound was largely based around the Dave Clark Five, but other London bands that benefited from the beat boom of this era included the Rolling Stones, the Yardbirds and the Kinks. The first non-Liverpool, non-Brian Epstein-managed band to break through in the UK were Freddie and the Dreamers, who were based in Manchester, as were Herman's Hermits. The beat movement provided most of the groups responsible for the British Invasion of the American pop charts in the period after 1964, and furnished the model for many important developments in pop and rock music.

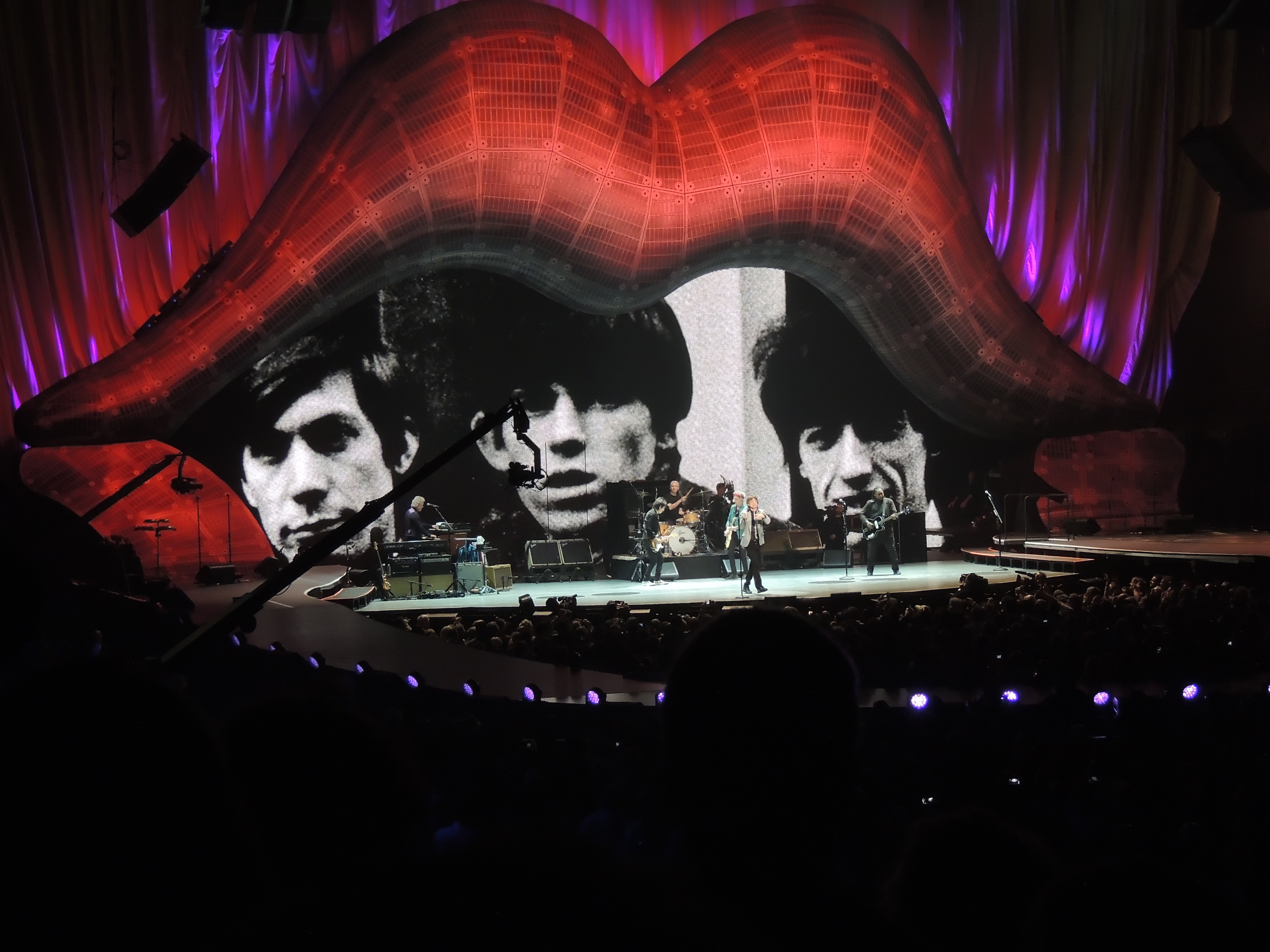
The Rolling Stones

By the end of 1962, the British rock scene had started with beat groups like the Beatles drawing on a wide range of American influences including soul music, rhythm and blues and surf music. Initially, they reinterpreted standard American tunes, playing for dancers doing the twist, for example. These groups eventually infused their original rock compositions with increasingly complex musical ideas and a distinctive sound. In mid-1962 the Rolling Stones started as one of a number of groups increasingly showing blues influence, along with bands like the Animals and the Yardbirds. During 1963, the Beatles and other beat groups, such as the Searchers and the Hollies, achieved great popularity and commercial success in Britain itself.

British rock broke through to mainstream popularity in the United States in January 1964 with the success of the Beatles. "I Want to Hold Your Hand" was the band's first No. 1 hit on the Billboard Hot 100 chart, starting the British Invasion of the American music charts. The song entered the chart on January 18, 1964, at No. 45 before it became the No. 1 single for 7 weeks and went on to last a total of 15 weeks in the chart. Their first appearance on The Ed Sullivan Show February 9 is considered a milestone in American pop culture. The broadcast drew an estimated 73 million viewers, at the time a record for an American television program. The Beatles went on to become the biggest selling rock band of all time and they were followed by numerous British bands.

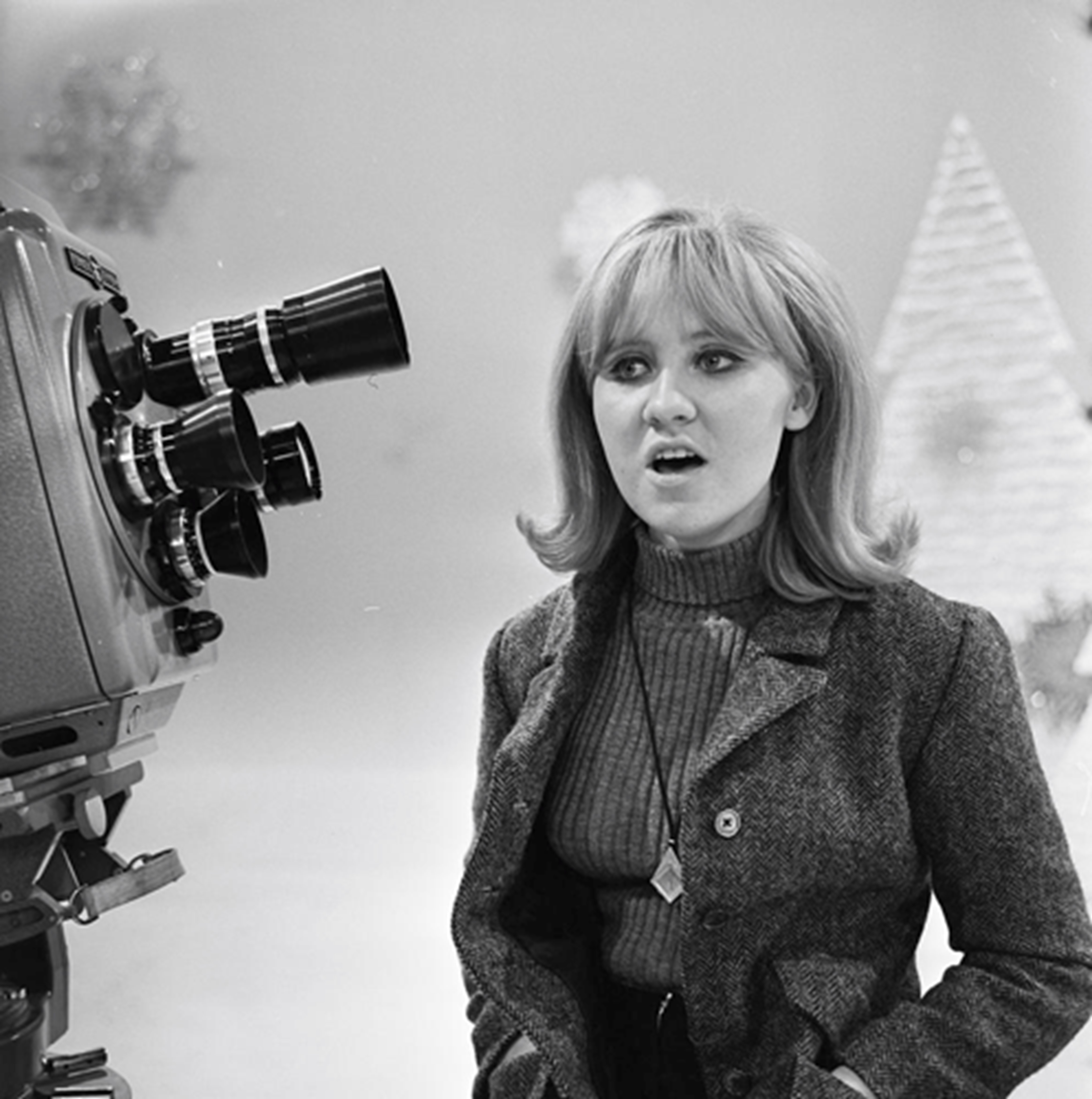
Lulu in 1965 on the set of Fanclub, Dutch TV

During the next two years, Chad & Jeremy, Peter and Gordon, the Animals, Manfred Mann, Petula Clark, Freddie and the Dreamers, Wayne Fontana and the Mindbenders, Herman's Hermits, the Rolling Stones, the Troggs, and Donovan would have one or more No. 1 singles. Other acts that were part of the invasion included the Kinks and the Dave Clark Five. British Invasion acts also dominated the music charts at home in the United Kingdom.

The British Invasion helped internationalize the production of rock and roll, opening the door for subsequent British (and Irish) performers to achieve international success. In America it arguably spelled the end of instrumental surf music, vocal girl groups and (for a time) the teen idols, that had dominated the American charts in the late 1950s and 1960s. It dented the careers of established R&B acts like Fats Domino and Chubby Checker and even temporarily derailed the chart success of surviving rock and roll acts, including Elvis Presley. The British Invasion also played a major part in the rise of a distinct genre of rock music, and cemented the primacy of the rock group, based on guitars and drums and producing their own material as singer-songwriters.

=== British blues boom ===
In parallel with Beat music, in the late 1950s and early 1960s a British blues scene was developing recreating the sounds of American R&B and later particularly the sounds of bluesmen Robert Johnson, Howlin' Wolf and Muddy Waters. It reached its height of mainstream popularity in the 1960s, when it developed a distinctive and influential style dominated by electric guitar and made international stars of several proponents of the genre including the Rolling Stones, Eric Clapton, the Yardbirds, Fleetwood Mac and Led Zeppelin.

A number of these moved through blues rock to different forms of rock music and as a result British blues helped to form many of the subgenres of rock, including psychedelic rock and heavy metal music. Since then direct interest in the blues in Britain has declined, but many of the key performers have returned to it in recent years, new acts have emerged and there have been a renewed interest in the genre.

=== British psychedelia ===
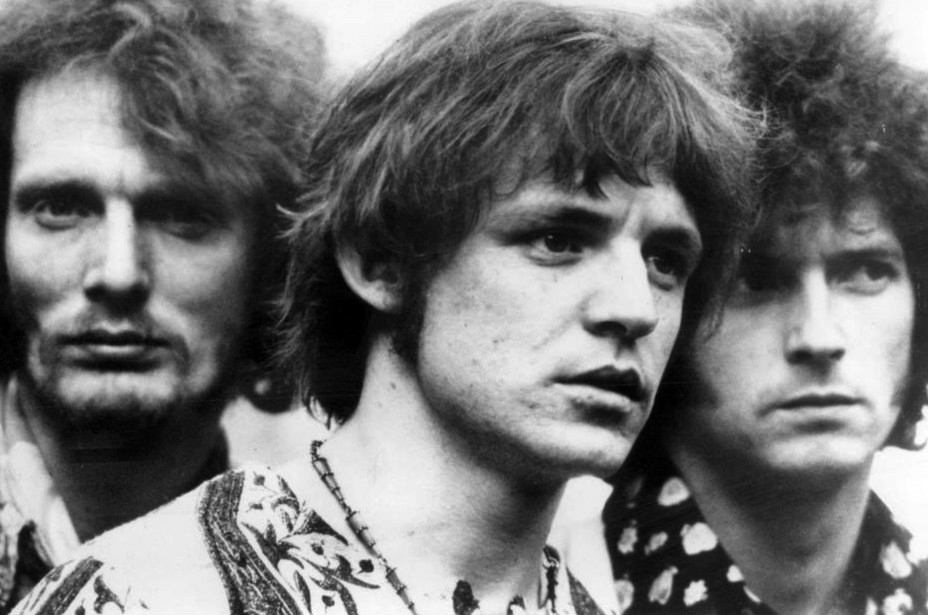
The British band Cream in 1966

British psychedelia emerged during the mid-1960s, was influenced by psychedelic culture and attempted to replicate and enhance the mind-altering experiences of hallucinogenic drugs. The movement drew on non-Western sources such as Indian music's ragas and sitars as well as studio effects and long instrumental passages and surreal lyrics. Established British artists such as Eric Burdon, the Who, Cream, Pink Floyd and the Beatles produced a number of highly psychedelic tunes during the decade. Many British psychedelia bands of the 1960s never published their music and only appeared in live concerts during that time.

== North America ==
=== Folk music ===
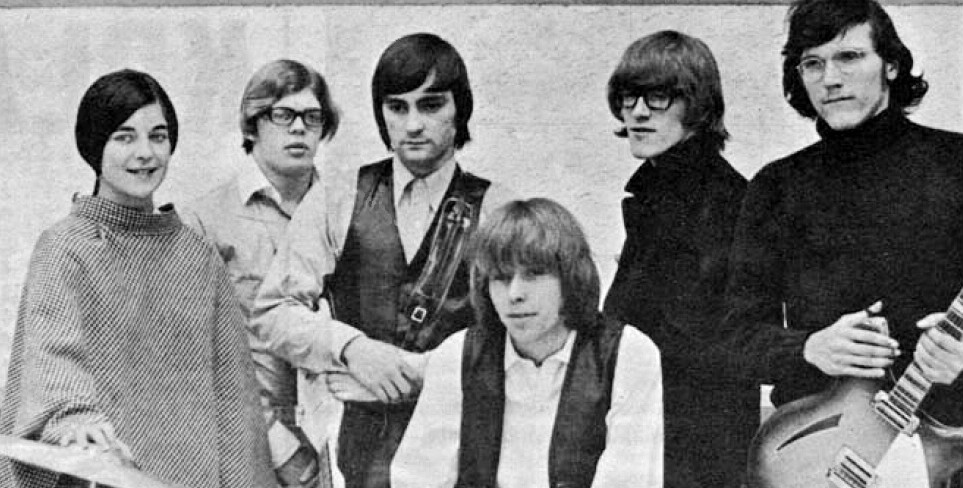
Jefferson Airplane in early 1966. From left: Anderson, Casady, Balin, Spence, Kantner and Kaukonen.

The Kingston Trio, the Weavers, Pete Seeger, Woody Guthrie, Odetta, Peter, Paul and Mary, Joan Baez, Bob Dylan, The Byrds, Judy Collins, Leonard Cohen, Joni Mitchell, Carolyn Hester, Phil Ochs, Tom Paxton, Buffy Sainte-Marie, Dave Van Ronk, The Mamas and the Papas, Tom Rush, Simon & Garfunkel, Fred Neil, Gordon Lightfoot, Ian and Sylvia, Arlo Guthrie and several other performers were instrumental in launching the folk music revival of the 1950s and 1960s.

=== Rock ===
Roy Orbison was one of rock's famous artists who wrote ballads of lost love.

In the early part of the decade, Elvis Presley continued to score hits. For most of the 60s, Presley mostly released films. Presley decided to get away from films by 1969; his last #1 song on the charts was Suspicious Minds which was released in 1969.

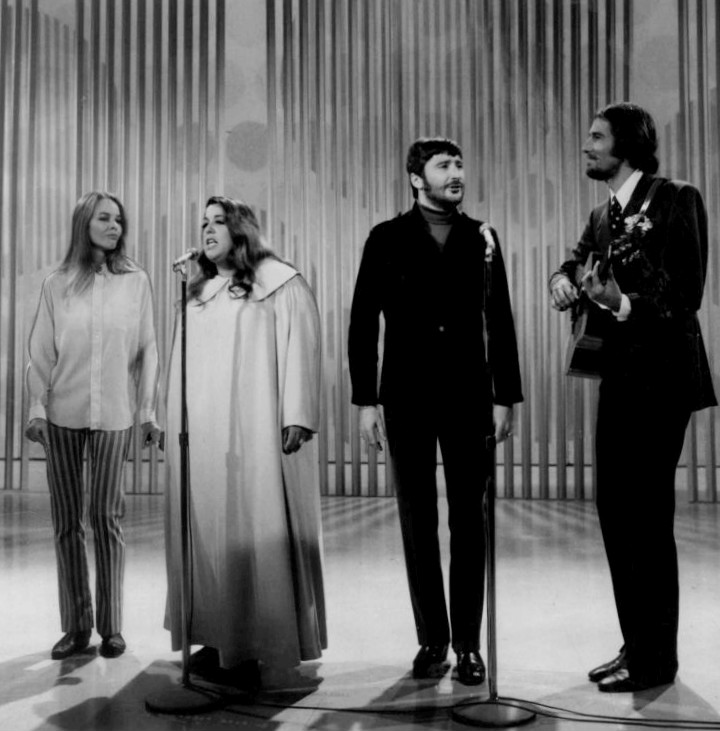
The Mamas & the Papas were one of the most prominent American Folk-rock artists of the decade

By the 1960s, the scene that had developed out of the American folk music revival had grown to a major movement, utilizing traditional music and new compositions in a traditional style, usually on acoustic instruments. In America the genre was pioneered by figures such as Woody Guthrie and Pete Seeger and often identified with progressive or labor politics. In the early sixties figures such as Bob Dylan, Chubby Checker, and Joan Baez had come to the fore in this movement as singer-songwriters. Dylan had begun to reach a mainstream audience with hits including "Blowin' in the Wind" (1963) and "Masters of War" (1963), which brought "protest songs" to a wider public, but, although beginning to influence each other, rock and folk music had remained largely separate genres, often with mutually exclusive audiences. Early attempts to combine elements of folk and rock included the Animals "House of the Rising Sun" (1964), which was the first commercially successful folk song to be recorded with rock and roll instrumentation. The folk rock movement is usually thought to have taken off with the Byrds' recording of Dylan's "Mr. Tambourine Man" which topped the charts in 1965. With members who had been part of the cafe-based folk scene in Los Angeles, the Byrds adopted rock instrumentation, including drums and 12-string Rickenbacker guitars, which became a major element in the sound of the genre.

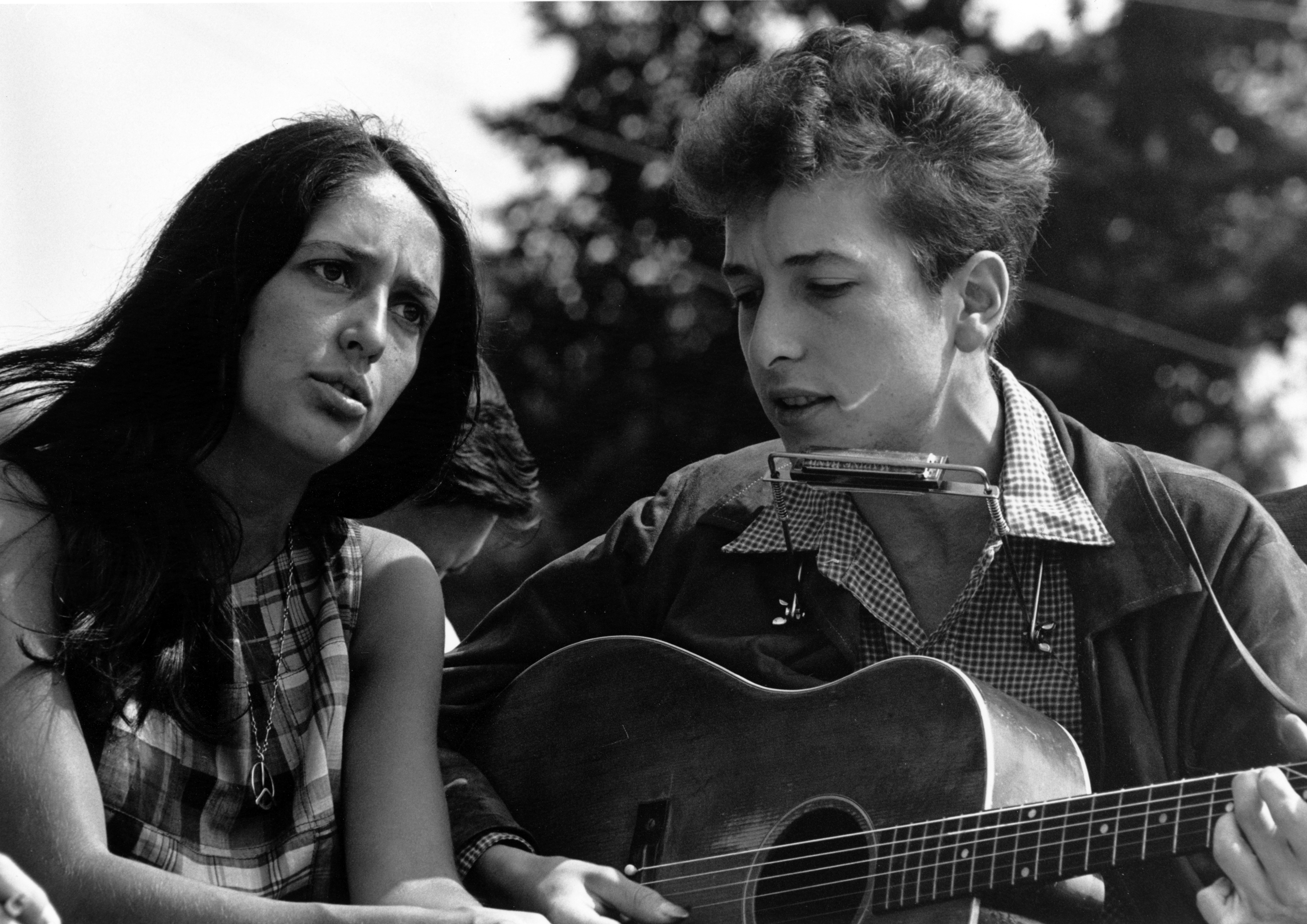
Joan Baez and Bob Dylan during the civil rights "March on Washington", 28 August 1963

By the mid-'60s Bob Dylan took the lead in merging folk and rock, and in July '65, released Like a Rolling Stone, with a revolutionary rock sound, steeped in tawdry urban imagery, followed by an electric performance later that month at the Newport Folk Festival. Dylan plugged an entire generation into the milieu of the singer-songwriter, often writing from an urban point of view, with poetry punctuated by rock rhythms and electric power. By the mid to late '60s, bands and singer-songwriters began to proliferate the underground New York art/music scene.

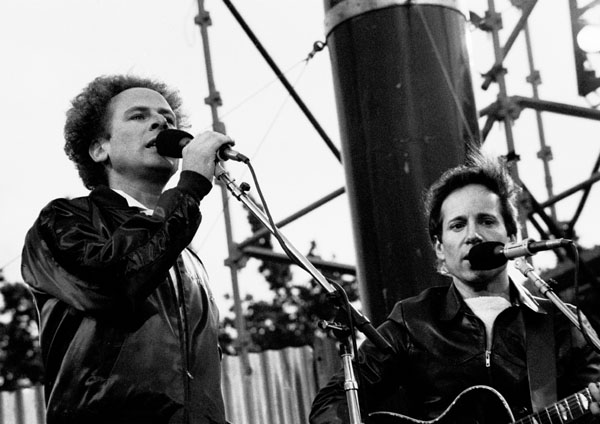
Simon and Garfunkel

The release of The Velvet Underground & Nico in 1967, featuring singer-songwriter Lou Reed and German singer and collaborator Nico was described as "most prophetic rock album ever made" by Rolling Stone in 2003. Other New York City based singer-songwriters began to emerge, using the urban landscape as their canvass for lyrics in the confessional style of poets like Anne Sexton and Sylvia Plath. In July, 1969, Newsweek magazine ran a feature story, "The Girls-Letting Go," describing the groundbreaking music of Joni Mitchell, Laura Nyro, Lotti Golden and Melanie, as a new breed of female troubadour: "What is common to them are the personalized songs they write, like voyages of self discovery, brimming with keen observation and startling in the impact of their poetry." The work of these early New York based singer-songwriters, from Laura Nyro's New York Tendaberry (1969), to Lotti Golden's East Village diaries on Motor-Cycle her 1969 debut on Atlantic Records, has served as inspiration to generations of female singer-songwriters in the rock, folk and jazz traditions. Dylan's adoptation of electric instruments, much to the outrage of many folk purists, with his "Like a Rolling Stone" succeeded in creating a new genre. Folk rock particularly took off in California, where it led acts like the Mamas & the Papas and Crosby, Stills and Nash to move to electric instrumentation, and in New York, where it spawned singer-songwriters and performers including the Lovin' Spoonful and Simon and Garfunkel, with the latter's acoustic "The Sounds of Silence" being remixed with rock instruments to be the first of many hits.

Folk rock reached its peak of commercial popularity in the period 1967–68, before many acts moved off in a variety of directions, including Dylan and the Byrds, who began to develop country rock. However, the hybridization of folk and rock has been seen as having a major influence on the development of rock music, bringing in elements of psychedelia, and in particular, helping to develop the ideas of the singer-songwriter, the protest song and concepts of "authenticity".

=== Psychedelic rock ===
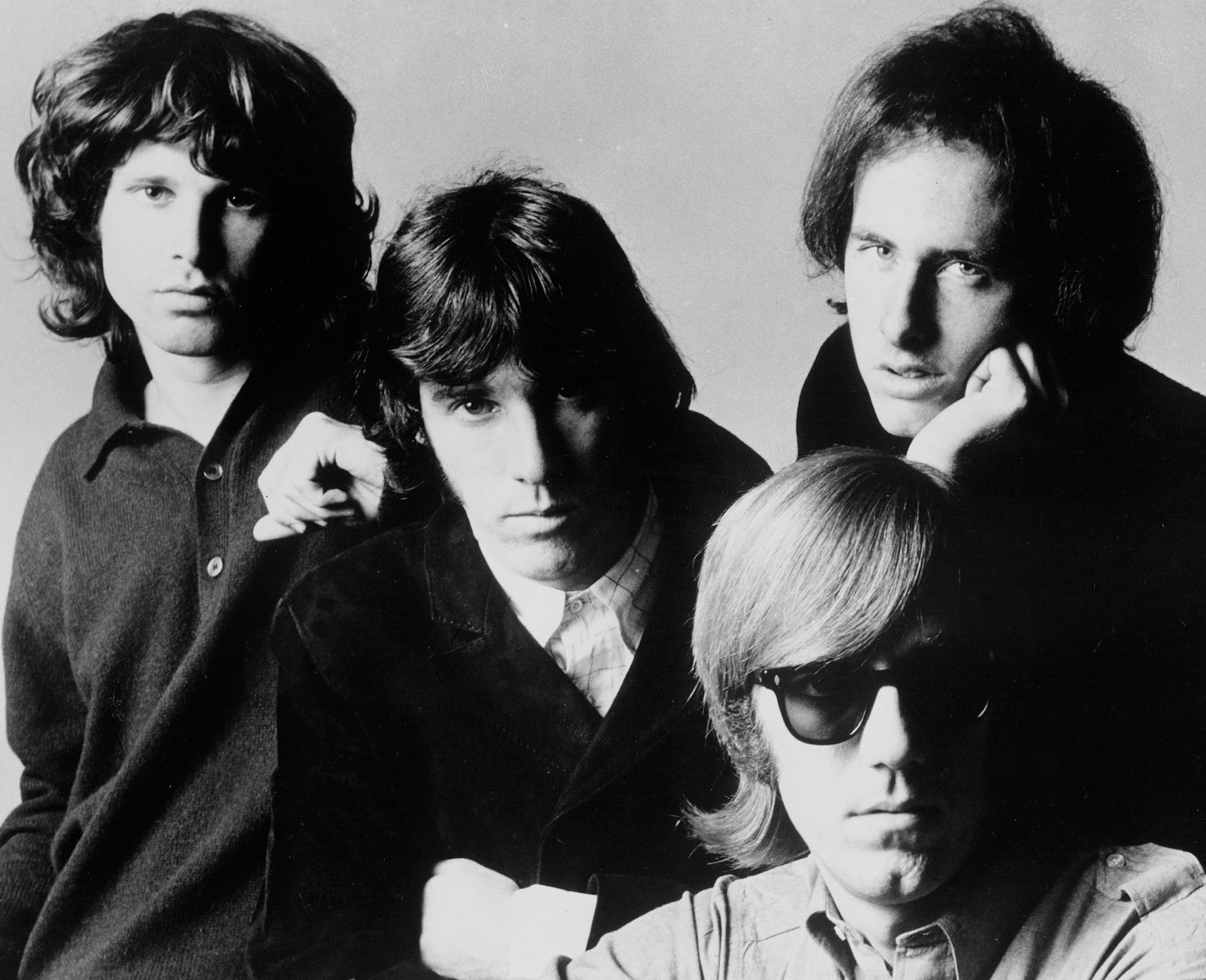
The Doors, 1966

Psychedelic music's LSD-inspired vibe began in the folk scene, with the New York-based Holy Modal Rounders using the term in their 1964 recording of "Hesitation Blues". The first group to advertise themselves as psychedelic rock were the 13th Floor Elevators from Texas, at the end of 1965; producing an album that made their direction clear, with The Psychedelic Sounds of the 13th Floor Elevators the following year.

Psychedelic rock particularly took off in California's emerging music scene as groups followed the Byrds from folk to folk rock from 1965. The Los Angeles-based group the Doors formed in 1965 after a chance meeting on Venice Beach. Although its charismatic lead singer Jim Morrison died in 1971, the band's popularity has endured to this day. The psychedelic life style had already developed in San Francisco since about 1964, and particularly prominent products of the scene were the Grateful Dead, Country Joe and the Fish, the Great Society and Jefferson Airplane. The Byrds rapidly progressed from purely folk rock in 1966 with their single "Eight Miles High", widely taken to be a reference to drug use.

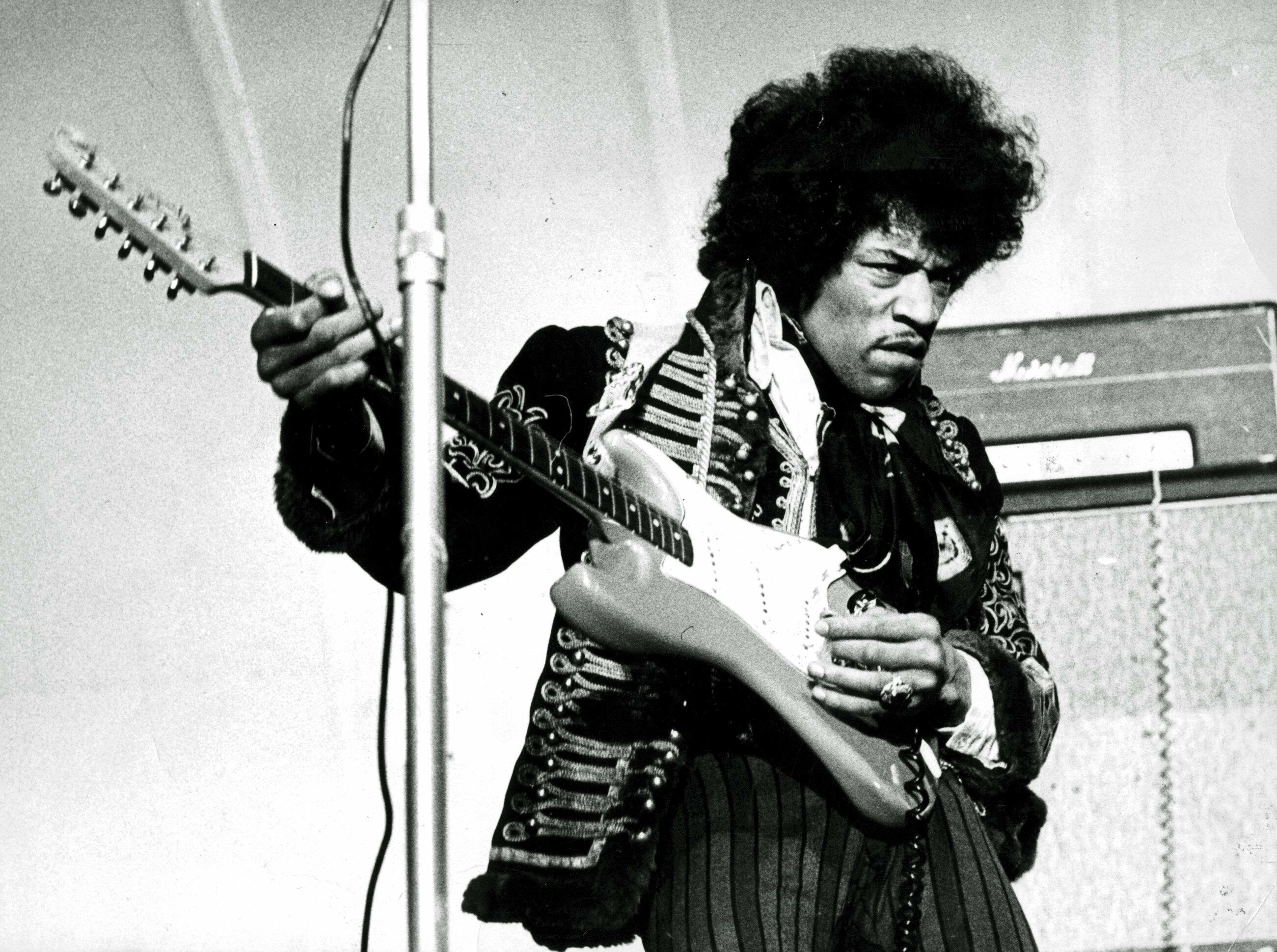
Jimi Hendrix, 1967

Psychedelic rock reached its apogee in the last years of the decade. In America the Summer of Love was prefaced by the Human Be-In event and reached its peak at the Monterey Pop Festival, the latter helping to make major American stars of Jimi Hendrix and the Who, whose single "I Can See for Miles" delved into psychedelic territory. Key recordings included Jefferson Airplane's Surrealistic Pillow and the Doors' Strange Days. These trends climaxed in the 1969 Woodstock Festival, which saw performances by most of the major psychedelic acts, but by the end of the decade psychedelic rock was in retreat. The Jimi Hendrix Experience broke up before the end of the decade and many surviving acts moved away from psychedelia into more back-to-basics "roots rock", the wider experimentation of progressive rock, or riff laden heavy rock.

=== Surf rock ===
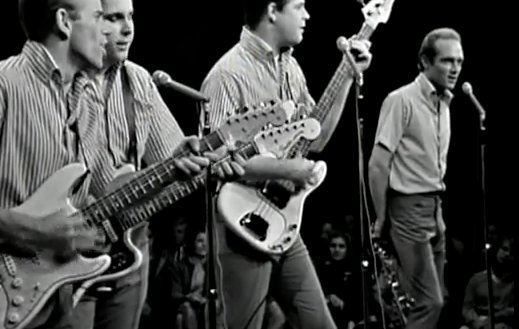
The Beach Boys, 1964

In the early 1960s, one of the most popular forms of rock and roll was Surf Rock, which was characterized by being nearly entirely instrumental and by heavy use of reverb on the guitars. The spring reverb featured in Fender amplifiers of the day, cranked to its maximum volume, produced a guitar tone shimmering with sustain and evoking surf and ocean imagery.

Duane Eddy's "Movin' and Groovin" is thought by many to be the main contender for laying the groundwork as the first surf rock record, while others claim the genre was invented by Dick Dale on "Let's Go Trippin'", which became a hit throughout California. Most early surf bands were formed during this decade in the Southern California area. By the mid-1960s the Beach Boys, who used complex pop harmonies over a basic surf rock rhythm, had emerged as the dominant surf group and helped popularize the genre in hits like "Surfin' U.S.A." In addition, bands such as the Ventures, the Shadows, the Atlantics, the Surfaris and the Champs were also among the most popular Surf Rock bands of the decade.

=== Garage rock ===
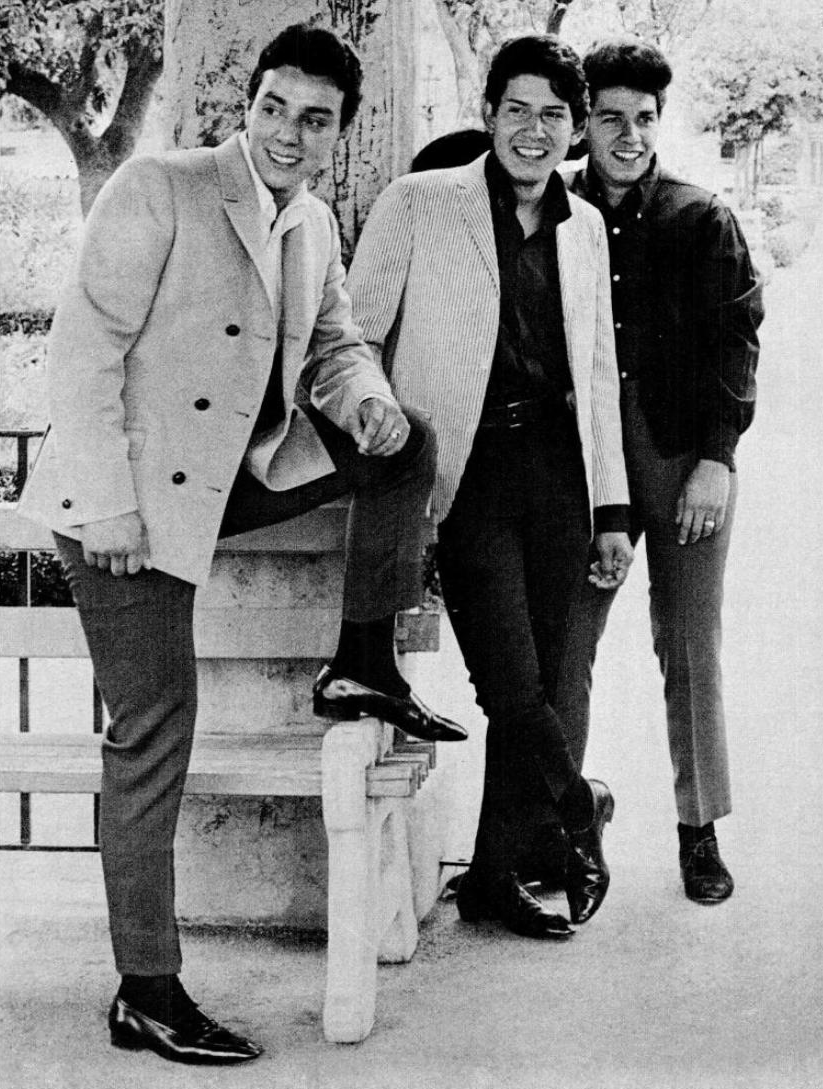
Cannibal & the Headhunters

Garage rock was a raw form of rock music, particularly prevalent in North America in the mid-1960s and is called such because of the perception that many of the bands rehearsed in a suburban family garage. Garage rock songs often revolved around the traumas of high school life, with songs about "lying girls" being particularly common. The lyrics and delivery were notably more aggressive than was common at the time, often with growled or shouted vocals that dissolved into incoherent screaming such as the influential Washington based band, The Sonics. They ranged from crude one-chord music (like the Seeds) to near-studio musician quality (including the Knickerbockers, the Remains, and the Fifth Estate). There were also regional variations in many parts of the country with flourishing scenes particularly in California and Texas. The Pacific Northwest states of Washington and Oregon had perhaps the most defined regional sound.

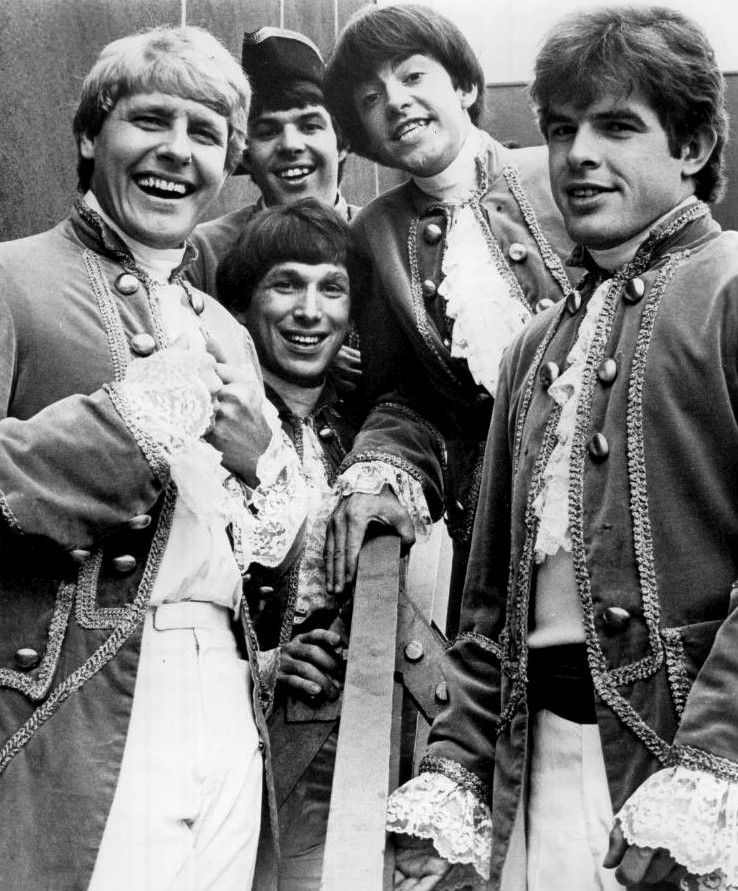
Paul Revere and the Raiders

The style had been evolving from regional scenes as early as 1958. "Louie Louie" by the Kingsmen (1963) is a mainstream example of the genre in its formative stages. By 1963, garage band singles were creeping into the national charts in greater numbers, including Paul Revere and the Raiders (Boise), the Trashmen (Minneapolis) and the Rivieras (South Bend, Indiana). In this early period many bands were heavily influenced by surf rock and there was a cross-pollination between garage rock and frat rock, sometimes viewed as merely a subgenre of garage rock.

The British Invasion of 1964–66 greatly influenced garage bands, providing them with a national audience, leading many (often surf or hot rod groups) to adopt a British Invasion lilt, and encouraging many more groups to form. Thousands of garage bands were extant in the US and Canada during the era and hundreds produced regional hits. Despite scores of bands being signed to major or large regional labels, most were commercial failures. It is generally agreed that garage rock peaked both commercially and artistically around 1966. By 1968 the style largely disappeared from the national charts and at the local level as amateur musicians faced college, work or the draft. New styles had evolved to replace garage rock (including blues-rock, progressive rock and country rock). In Detroit garage rock stayed alive until the early '70s, with bands like the MC5 and the Stooges, who employed a much more aggressive style. These bands began to be labelled punk rock and are now often seen as proto-punk or proto-hard rock.

=== Blues-rock ===
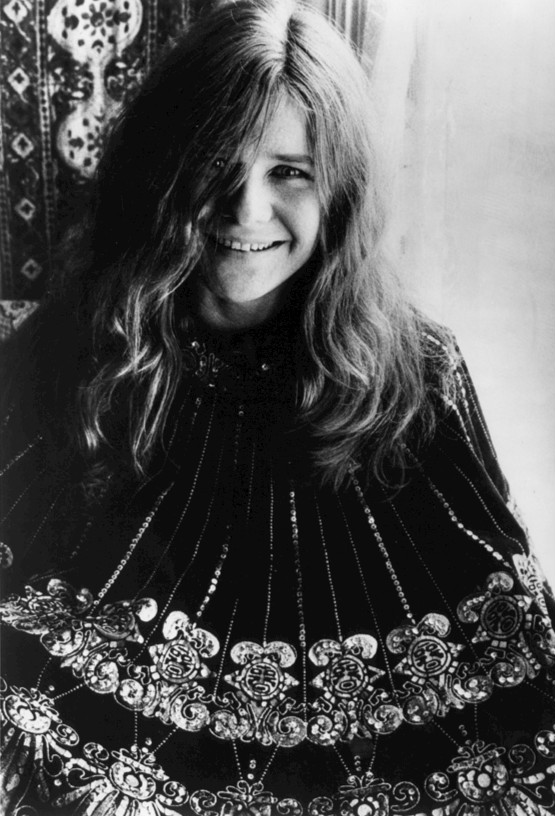
Janis Joplin was one of the most prominent American Blues-rock artists of the decade.

The American blues-rock had been pioneered in the early 1960s by guitarist Lonnie Mack, but the genre began to take off in the mid-'60s as acts followed developed a sound similar to British blues musicians. Key acts included Paul Butterfield (whose band acted like Mayall's Bluesbreakers in Britain as a starting point for many successful musicians), Canned Heat, the early Jefferson Airplane, Janis Joplin, Johnny Winter, the J. Geils Band and Jimi Hendrix with his power trios, the Jimi Hendrix Experience and Band of Gypsys, whose guitar virtuosity and showmanship would be among the most emulated of the decade. Blues-rock bands like Allman Brothers Band, Lynyrd Skynyrd and eventually ZZ Top from the southern states, incorporated country elements into their style to produce distinctive Southern rock.

=== Roots rock ===
Roots rock is the term now used to describe a move away from the excesses of the psychedelic scene, to a more basic form of rock and roll that incorporated its original influences, particularly country and folk music, leading to the creation of country rock and Southern rock. In 1966, Bob Dylan spearheaded the movement when he went to Nashville to record the album Blonde on Blonde. This, and subsequent more clearly country-influenced albums, have been seen as creating the genre of country folk, a route pursued by a number of, largely acoustic, folk musicians. Other acts that followed the back-to-basics trend were the group the Band and the Californian-based Creedence Clearwater Revival, both of which mixed basic rock and roll with folk, country and blues, to be among the most successful and influential bands of the late 1960s. The same movement saw the beginning of the recording careers of Californian solo artists like Ry Cooder, Bonnie Raitt and Lowell George, and influenced the work of established performers such as the Rolling Stones' Beggar's Banquet (1968) and the Beatles' Let It Be (1970).

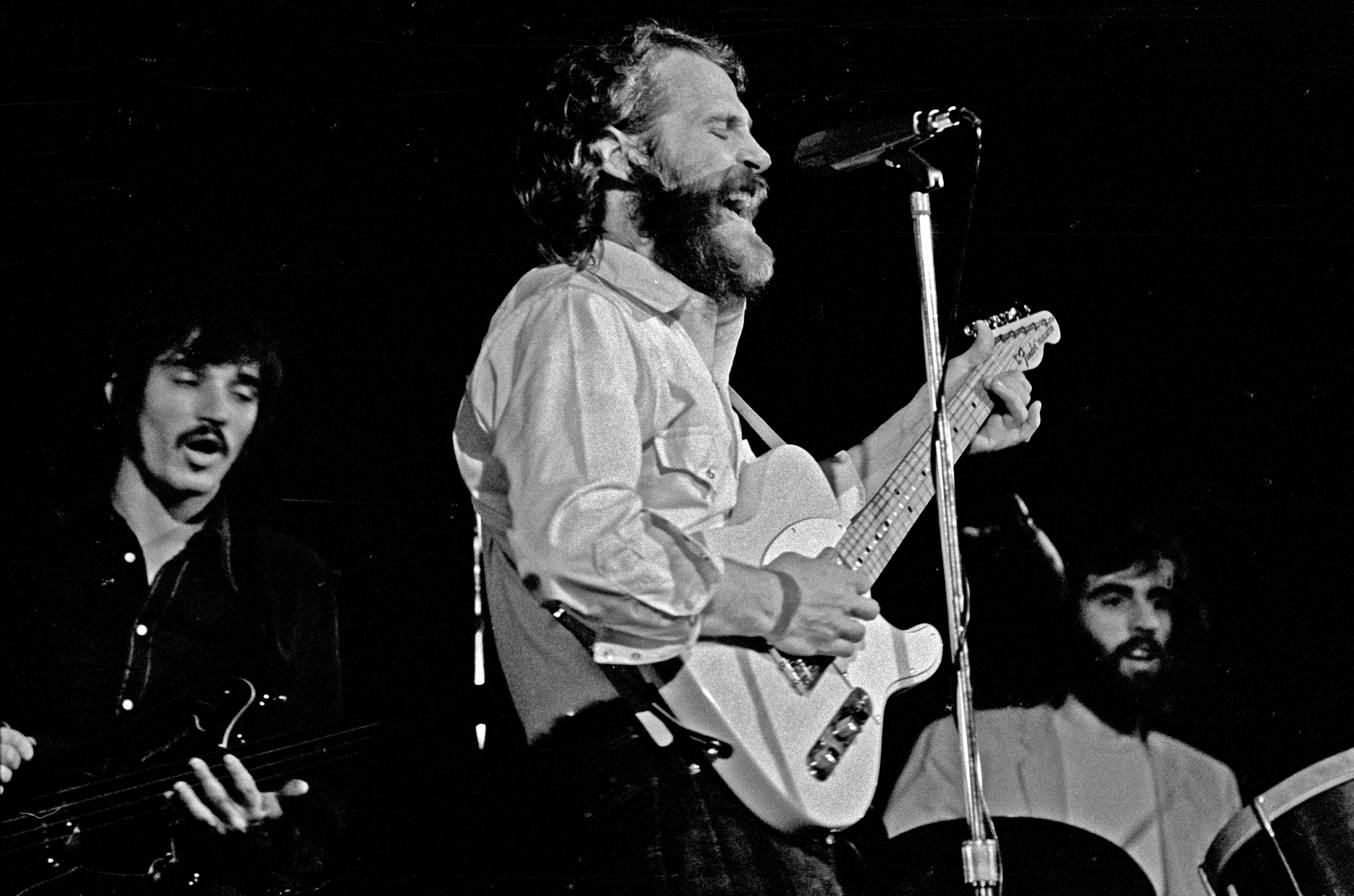
Canadian group, the Band, live in Hamburg

In 1968, Gram Parsons recorded Safe at Home with the International Submarine Band, arguably the first true country rock album. Later that year he joined the Byrds for Sweetheart of the Rodeo (1968), generally considered one of the most influential recordings in the genre. The Byrds continued in the same vein, but Parsons left to be joined by another ex-Byrds member Chris Hillman in forming the Flying Burrito Brothers who helped establish the respectability and parameters of the genre, before Parsons departed to pursue a solo career. Country rock was particularly popular in the Californian music scene, where it was adopted by bands including Hearts & Flowers, Poco and Riders of the Purple Sage, the Beau Brummels and the Nitty Gritty Dirt Band. A number of performers also enjoyed a renaissance by adopting country sounds, including: the Everly Brothers; one-time teen idol Ricky Nelson who became the frontman for the Stone Canyon Band; former Monkee Mike Nesmith who formed the First National Band; and Neil Young. The Dillards were, unusually, a country act, who moved towards rock music. The greatest commercial success for country rock came in the 1970s, with artist including the Doobie Brothers, Emmylou Harris, Linda Ronstadt and the Eagles (made up of members of the Burritos, Poco and Stone Canyon Band), who emerged as one of the most successful rock acts of all time, producing albums that included Hotel California (1976).

The founders of Southern rock are usually thought to be the Allman Brothers Band, who developed a distinctive sound, largely derived from blues rock, but incorporating elements of boogie, soul and country in the early 1970s. The most successful act to follow them were Lynyrd Skynyrd, who helped establish the "good ol' boy" image of the subgenre and the general shape of 1970s guitar rock. Their successors included the fusion/progressive instrumentalists Dixie Dregs, the more country-influenced Outlaws, jazz-leaning Wet Willie and (incorporating elements of R&B and gospel) the Ozark Mountain Daredevils. After the loss of original members of the Allmans and Lynyrd Skynyrd, the genre began to fade in popularity in the late 1970s, but was sustained the 1980s with acts like .38 Special, Molly Hatchet and the Marshall Tucker Band.

=== Progressive rock ===
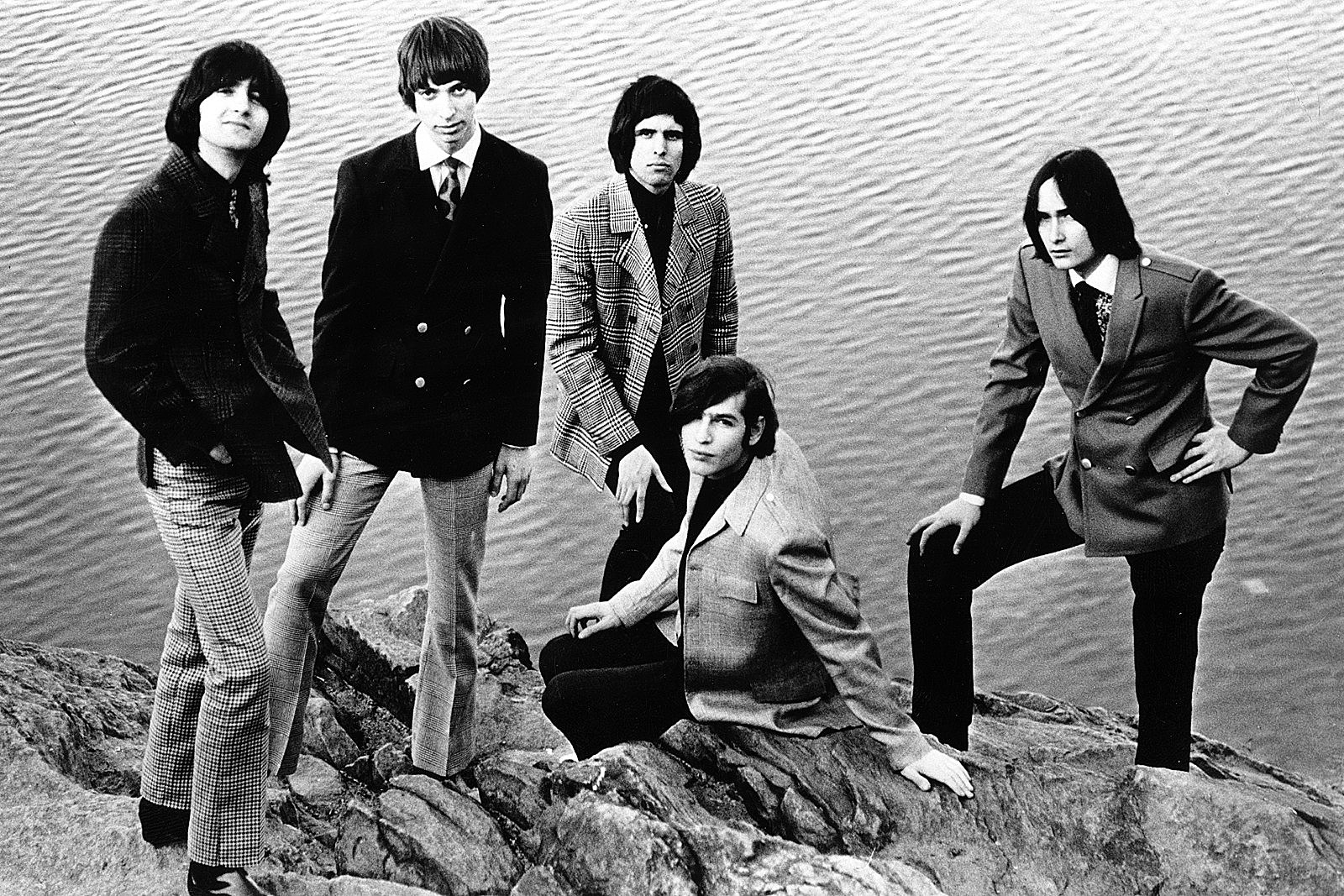
The Left Banke

Progressive rock, sometimes used interchangeably with art rock, was an attempt to move beyond established musical formulas by experimenting with different instruments, song types and forms. From the mid-1960s the Left Banke, the Beatles, the Rolling Stones and the Beach Boys, had pioneered the inclusion of harpsichords, wind and string sections on their recordings to produce a form of Baroque rock and can be heard in singles like Procol Harum's "A Whiter Shade of Pale" (1967), with its Bach inspired introduction. The Moody Blues used a full orchestra on their album Days of Future Passed (1967) and subsequently created orchestral sounds with synthesisers. Classical orchestration, keyboards and synthesisers were a frequent edition to the established rock format of guitars, bass and drums in subsequent progressive rock.

Instrumentals were common, while songs with lyrics were sometimes conceptual, abstract or based in fantasy and science fiction. The Pretty Things' SF Sorrow (1968) and the Who's Tommy (1969) introduced the format of rock operas and opened the door to "concept albums, usually telling an epic story or tackling a grand overarching theme." King Crimson's 1969 début album, In the Court of the Crimson King, which mixed powerful guitar riffs and mellotron, with jazz and symphonic music, is often taken as the key recording in progressive rock, helping the widespread adoption of the genre in the early 1970s among existing blues-rock and psychedelic bands, as well as newly formed acts.

=== Pop ===
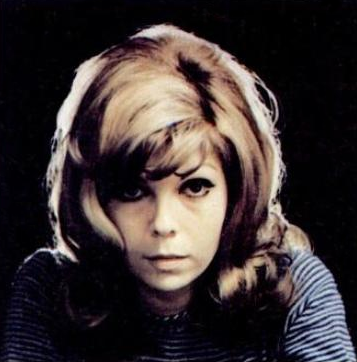
Nancy Sinatra 1967

Chubby Checker during the early 1960s popularizes the enduring dance craze the Twist with his hit cover of Hank Ballard & the Midnighters' R&B hit "The Twist".

The Brill Building at 1619 Broadway in New York City became the centre of the American music industry that dominated the pop charts in the early 1960s, nurturing many prolific songwriting partnerships. Gerry Goffin and Carole King become a very influential duo in pop music, writing numerous number-one hits including the first song to ever reach number-one by a girl group, The Shirelles "Will You Love Me Tomorrow" and the 1962 number-one hit, "The Loco-Motion" which was performed by Little Eva. Other hits included "Take Good Care of My Baby" (Bobby Vee), "Up on the Roof" (The Drifters), "I'm Into Something Good" (Herman's Hermits), and "One Fine Day" (The Chiffons). Likewise, songwriting couple Ellie Greenwich and Jeff Barry turned out a stream of charting songs, including "Da Doo Ron Ron", "Be My Baby", "Then He Kissed Me", and "Leader of the Pack"; whilst Barry Mann and Cynthia Weil were behind several major hits of the era, including "You've Lost That Lovin' Feelin'", the recording of which by the Righteous Brothers became the most played record on air in the 20th century.

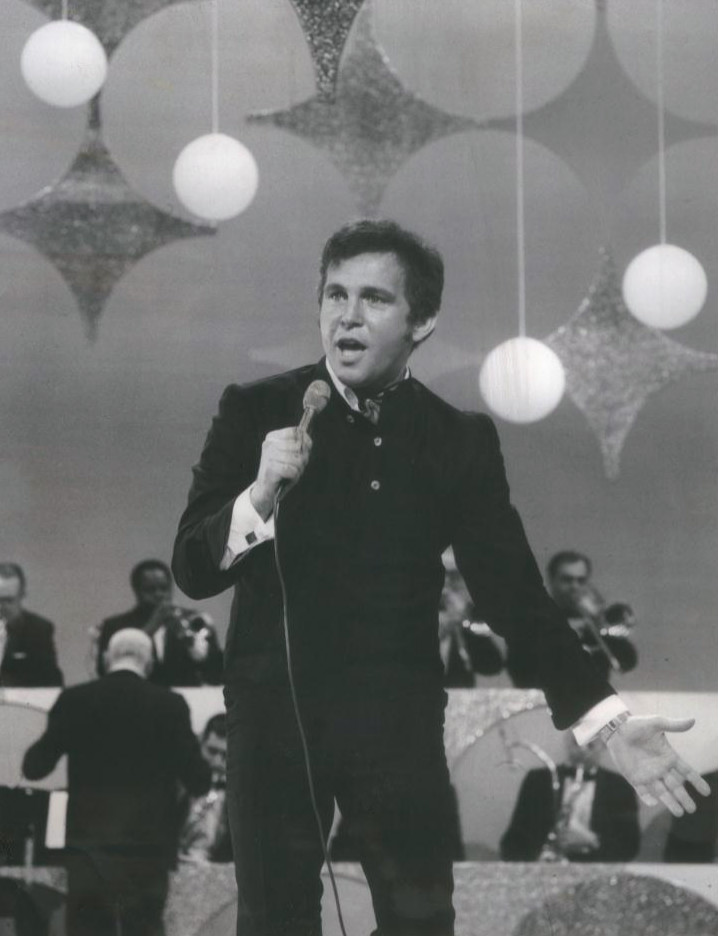
Bobby Vinton performing on The Ed Sullivan Show in 1969

"Sugar, Sugar" becomes a big hit for The Archies, defining the bubblegum pop genre.

The Monkees were a made for TV band, inspired by the antics of the Beatles in A Hard Day's Night. Under contractual reasons, the group were not allowed to play their own instruments, which led to many feuds between the bandmates and music supervisor, Don Kirshner.

The Monkees and The Archies were not unique; in fact, bands not playing their instruments on record was not unusual. Producers like Mickie Most regularly used experienced session musicians whose discipline helped produce a number of tighter-sounding commercial recordings within one time-limited studio session (typically 3 hours).

Studios and producers regularly experimented with session singers and musicians to create a hit. One example was Ohio Express. A single by The Rare Breed, "Beg Borrow And Steal", was picked up by a production company. They remixed the track and credited a new single to Ohio Express" – a name they wholly owned. when it became a hit, the production company quickly assembled a touring band (whose members became the bands' public identity), while making their recordings using other acts or collectives of session musicians as and when available.

=== R&B, Motown and soul music ===
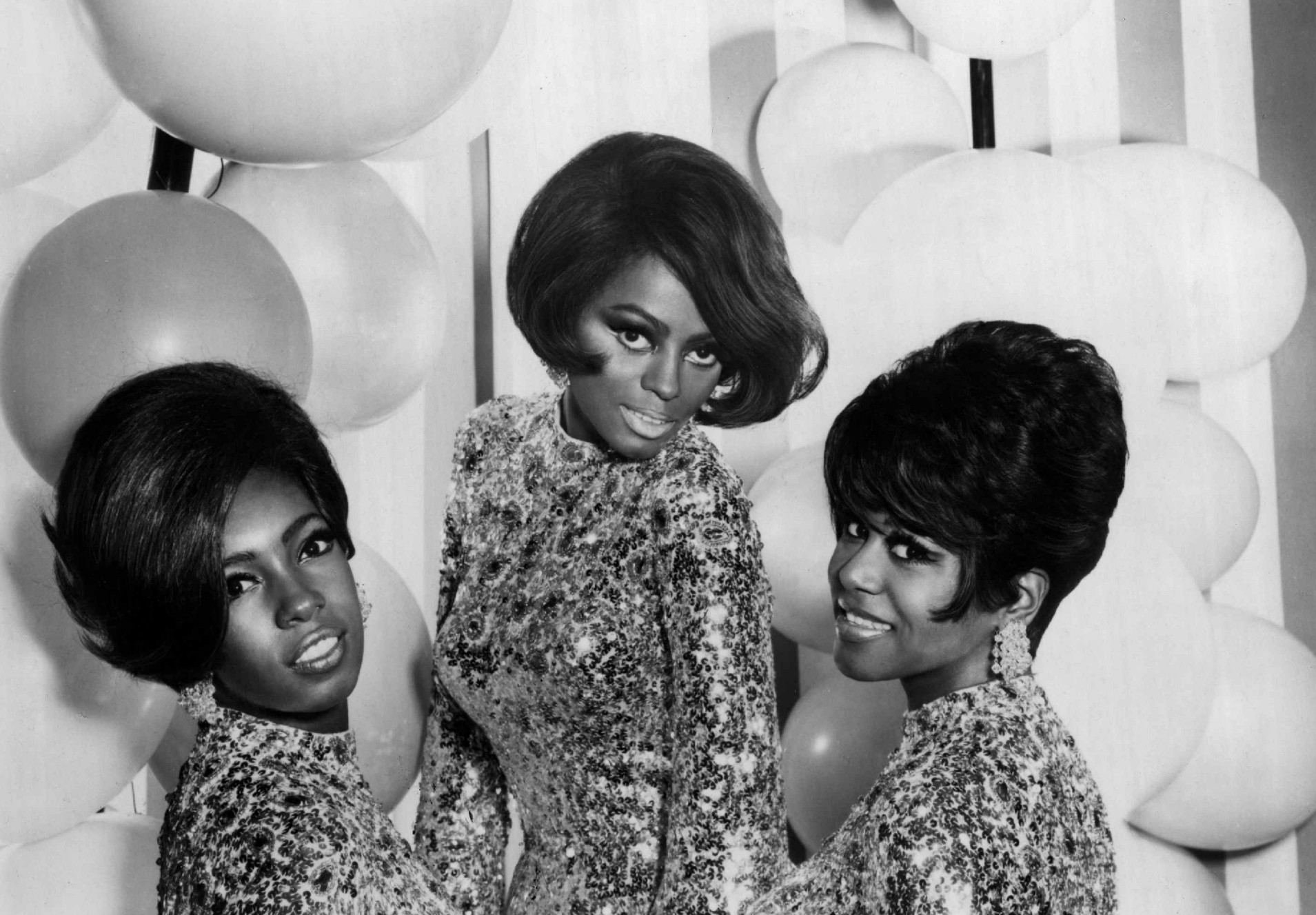
The Supremes female singing group and a premier act of Motown Records during the 1960s.

- The Detroit-based Motown label developed as a pop-influenced answer to soul music. The label began a long run of No. 1 U.S. hit singles in 1961 with "Please Mr. Postman" by the Marvelettes, and had numerous No. 1 Billboard hits throughout the decade and into the 1990s. The label's success was driven by songwriters who helped define the Motown sound of the 1960s, including Norman Whitfield, Smokey Robinson and Holland-Dozier-Holland, the latter of whom turned out many notable hits for emerging artists, including and especially the Four Tops and the Supremes. These included "I Can't Help Myself (Sugar Pie Honey Bunch)" and "It's the Same Old Song" for the Tops; and "Baby Love", "You Keep Me Hangin' On" and "Stop! In the Name of Love" for the Supremes. In 1966, The Supremes gained big hit "You Can't Hurry Love" with innovative bassist James Jamerson. Other notable Motown acts included the Miracles, the Temptations, Martha and the Vandellas, Marvin Gaye and the Jackson Five, who debuted in 1969.
- Soul music developed popularity throughout the decade, with Atlantic Records as the key label and Solomon Burke as a key figure in the emergence of soul music as an established movement. Ben E. King also achieved success in 1961 with "Stand By Me", a song directly based on a gospel hymn. By the mid-1960s, the initial successes of Burke, King, and others had been surpassed by soul singers such as Sam Cooke, James Brown and Otis Redding.
- The most important female soul singer to emerge was Aretha Franklin, originally a gospel singer who began to make secular recordings in 1960 but whose career was later revitalised by her recordings for Atlantic. Her 1967 recordings, such as "I Never Loved a Man (The Way I Love You)", "Respect" (originally sung by Otis Redding), and "Do Right Woman-Do Right Man", are considered the apogee of the soul genre, and were among its most commercially successful productions.
- By 1968, while at its peak of popularity, soul began to fragment into disparate subgenres. Artists such as James Brown and Sly and the Family Stone evolved into funk music, while other singers such as Marvin Gaye, Stevie Wonder, Curtis Mayfield and Al Green developed slicker, more sophisticated – and in some cases more politically conscious – varieties of the genre. However, soul music continued to evolve, informing most subsequent forms of R&B from the 1970s-onward, with pockets of musicians continuing to perform in a traditional soul style.
- In the UK, Dusty Springfield helped popularise soul music – merged with pop – and became one of the most popular female performers on both sides of the Atlantic. One of her defining works was the 1968 album Dusty in Memphis, featuring her signature song "Son of a Preacher Man", an international hit (UK no.9/Us no. 10).

=== Country music ===
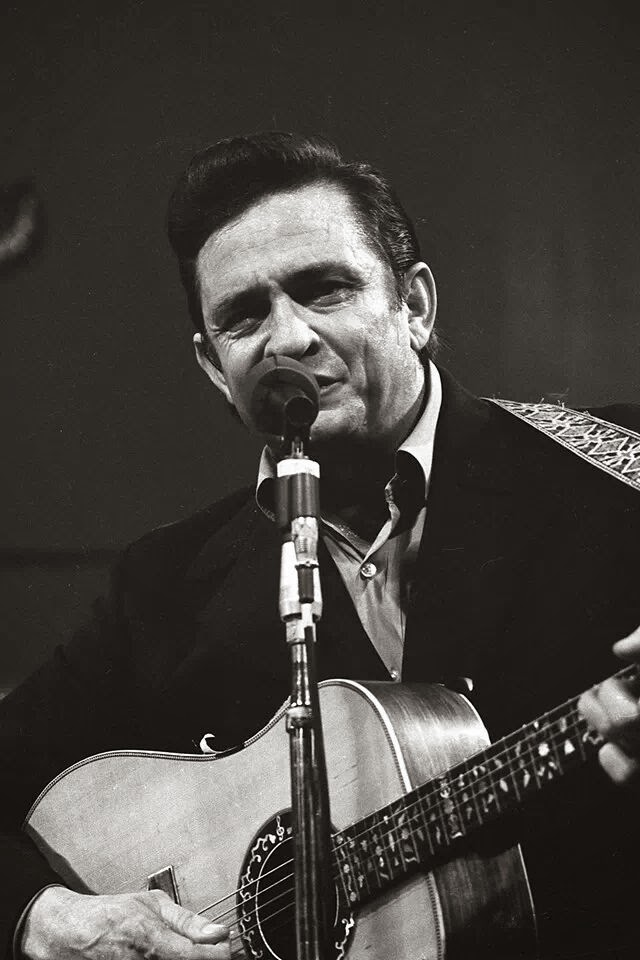
Johnny Cash was one of the most popular country music artists during the 1960s.

Triumph and great tragedy marked the 1960s in country music. The genre continued to gain national exposure through network television, with weekly series and awards programs gaining popularity. Sales of records continued to rise as new artists and trends came to the forefront. However, several top stars died under tragic circumstances, including several who were killed in plane crashes.

The predominant musical style during the decade was the Nashville Sound, a style that emphasized string sections, background vocals, crooning lead vocals and production styles seen in country music. The style had first become popular in the late 1950s, in response to the growing encroachment of rock and roll on the country genre, but saw its greatest success in the 1960s. Artists like Jim Reeves, Eddy Arnold, Ray Price, Patsy Cline, Floyd Cramer, Roger Miller and many others achieved great success through songs such as "He'll Have to Go," "Danny Boy," "Make the World Go Away", "King of the Road" and "I Fall to Pieces." The country-pop style was also evident on the 1962 album Modern Sounds in Country and Western Music, recorded by rhythm and blues and soul singer Ray Charles. Charles recorded covers of traditional country, folk and classical music standards in pop, R&B and jazz styles. The album was hailed as a critical and commercial success, and would be vastly influential in later country music styles. Songs from the album that were released for commercial airplay and record sales included "I Can't Stop Loving You," "Born to Lose" and "You Don't Know Me."

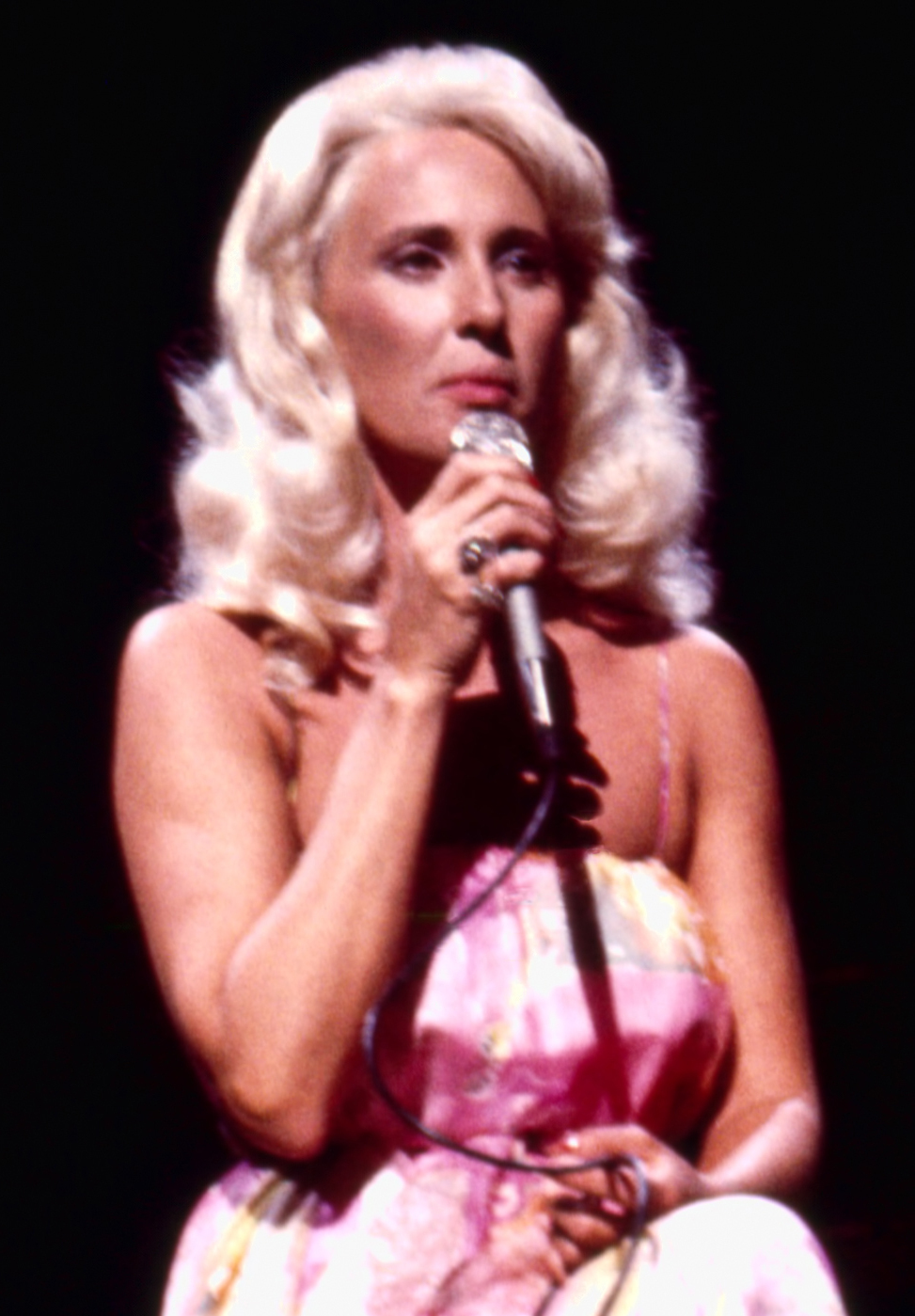
Tammy Wynette

By the end of the decade, the Nashville Sound became more polished and streamlined, and became known as "countrypolitan." Tammy Wynette, Glen Campbell, Dottie West and Charley Pride were among the top artists adopting this style. While George Jones — by the early 1960s one of country music's most consistent hitmakers — also recorded countrypolitan-styled music, his background remained honky tonk, singing of heartbreak and loneliness in many of his songs. Also, Marty Robbins proved to be one of the genre's most diverse singers, singing many ways, such as country, western, pop, blues, and Hawaiian.

Johnny Cash, who began his career at Sun Records in the 1950s with hits such as "I Walk The Line," ultimately became one of the most influential musicians of the 1960s (and eventually, 20th century), and was labeled "The Man In Black." Although primarily recording country, his songs and sound spanned many other genres including rockabilly, blues, folk and gospel. His music showed great compassion for minorities and others who were shunned by society, including prison inmates. Two of Cash's most successful albums were recorded live in prison: At Folsom Prison and At San Quentin.

During the latter half of the 1960s, Pride — a native of Sledge, Mississippi — became the first African-American superstar in country music, a genre virtually dominated by white artists. Some of his early hits, sung with a smooth baritone voice and in a style meshing honky-tonk and countrypolitan, included "Just Between You and Me," "The Easy Part's Over," "All I Have to Offer You (Is Me)" and a cover version of Hank Williams' "Kaw-Liga." Pride continued to be successful for more than 20 years, amassing an eventual 29 No. 1 hits on the Billboard Hot Country Singles chart.

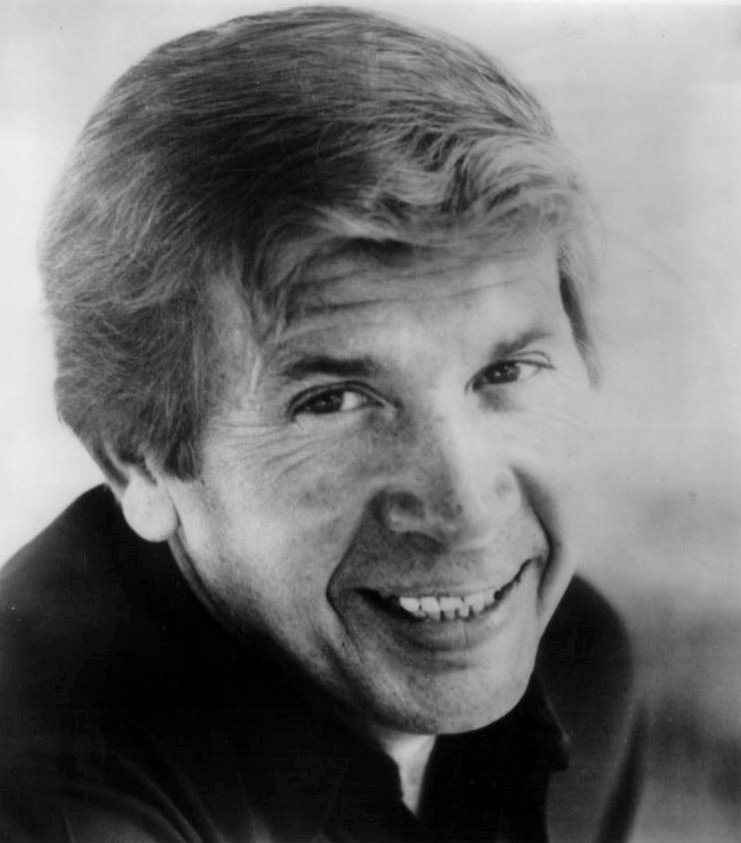
Buck Owens

A newly emerging style, which had its roots in the 1950s but exploded in the mainstream during the 1960s, was the "Bakersfield sound." Instead of creating a sound similar to mainstream pop music, the Bakersfield sound used honky tonk as its base and added electric instruments and a backbeat, plus stylistic elements borrowed from rock and roll. Buck Owens, Merle Haggard and Wynn Stewart were some of the top artists adopting this sound, and by the late 1960s they were among country music's top selling artists.

The 1960s also marked the rise of a young Abbott, Texas, songwriter named Willie Nelson. Starting as a disc jockey in the late 1950s, he began honing his craft and wrote his first hit, "Family Bible," which he sold the rights to guitar instructor Paul Buskirk before it eventually became a hit for Claude Gray in 1960. By early 1961, Nelson's songwriting was gaining national attention, as several of his songs became country standards: "Funny How Time Slips Away", "Hello Walls", "Pretty Paper", "Night Life" and "Crazy" ... all of them for other artists including – respectively – Billy Walker, Faron Young, Roy Orbison, Ray Price and Patsy Cline. He recorded an album, ...And Then I Wrote, and eventually signed with RCA Records, but during most of the 1960s, most of his single releases were mid-chart hits at best; his recording career would not come to full fruition until the mid-1970s, after he became associated with the outlaw movement.

Among female acts, the most successful of the lot were Loretta Lynn, Tammy Wynette and Dolly Parton. Lynn, a native of Butcher Hollow, Kentucky, and indeed, the daughter of a coal miner, would—with the help of her husband, Oliver "Doolittle" Lynn—gain a recording contract with Zero Records in 1960, and while only her first single ("Honky Tonk Girl") of her early 1960s releases charted, her early recordings were the springboard for much bigger and better things to come. By the latter half of the decade, and continuing into the 1970s, she was recording songs that defied the stereotype of the woman who had to put up with men, their hard drinking, philandering and other negative traits—for instance, "Don't Come Home A-Drinkin' (With Lovin' on Your Mind)"—as well as songs that pushed the genre's conservative boundaries ("Dear Uncle Sam," a song about the Vietnam War) and her willingness to stand up to other women ("You Ain't Woman Enough (To Take My Man)").

Parton, a native of the Smoky Mountains town of Locust Ridge, Tennessee, gained national exposure on the nationally syndicated program The Porter Wagoner Show, on which she began appearing in 1967. Two years earlier, she had signed a recording contract with Monument Records and was pushed as a bubblegum pop singer, but had only minor success before one of her compositions – "Put It Off Until Tomorrow" – became a big hit for Bill Phillips (a track which Parton provided backing vocals) in 1966. Eventually, her mountain-influenced, biographical brand of country and her down-home personality won many fans, and her star power would only begin to rise. Her first major hits were mainly duets with Wagoner, although she had several solo hits—including her breakthrough, "Dumb Blonde"—as well.

Wynette gained acclaim with unique perspectives on the classic themes of loneliness, divorce, and the difficulties of life and relationships, illustrated by songs such as "I Don't Wanna Play House" and "D-I-V-O-R-C-E." However, it was "Stand By Your Man," a song pledging of unyielding faithfulness and standing by men despite their shortcomings, that gave Wynette her career hit. By the late 1960s, she was married to fellow country music singer George Jones.

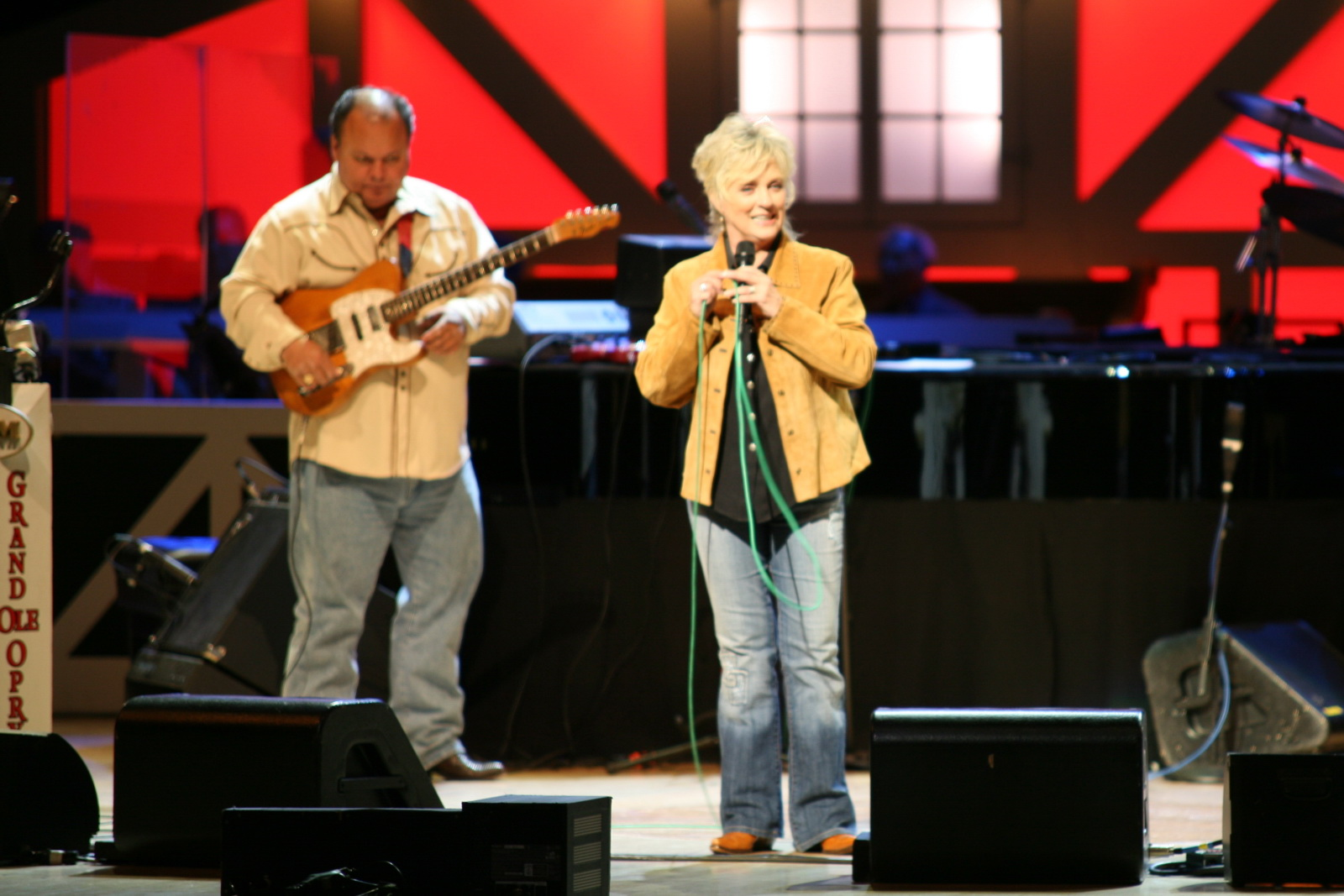
Connie Smith

Among other female newcomers, Connie Smith was among the most successful, as her breakthrough hit, "Once a Day" spent eight weeks at No. 1 on the Billboard Hot Country Singles chart in late 1964 and early 1965, the longest-running chart-topper for nearly 50 years. During a career that has spanned 50-plus years, Smith's songs often explored themes of loneliness and vulnerability.

In addition to the syndicated The Porter Wagoner Show, several other television programs were produced to allow country music to reach a wider audience, such as The Jimmy Dean Show in mid-decade. At the end of the decade, Hee Haw began a 23-year run, first on CBS and later in syndication; Hee Haw, hosted by Owens and Roy Clark was loosely based on the comedy series Rowan & Martin's Laugh In, and incorporated comedy along with performances by the show's cast or guest performers from the country music field. The Academy of Country Music and Country Music Association awards programs were telecast for the first time in the late 1960s.

The 1960s were marred with tragedy. Johnny Horton, who sang in the saga-song style, was killed in a car accident in 1960. A March 5, 1963, plane crash claimed the lives of Patsy Cline, Cowboy Copas and Hawkshaw Hawkins. Days later, Jack Anglin was killed in a car accident, while Texas Ruby died in a trailer fire in Texas. In July 1964, Jim Reeves lost his life while piloting a plane near Brentwood, Tennessee. Ira Louvin (one half of the Louvin Brothers) was killed in a car accident in 1965. Success overcame several of those tragic deaths, as both Cline and Reeves had many posthumous hits (with previously recorded songs issued after their deaths) and enjoyed strong followings for many years, while Louvin's brother, Charlie, continued as a successful solo performer for more than 40 years. Other pioneering stars who died during the 1960s included A.P. Carter, Gid Tanner, Moon Mullican, Ernest "Pop" Stoneman, Red Foley, Leon Payne and Spade Cooley.

The 1960s began a trend toward a proliferation of No. 1 hits on the Billboard Hot Country Singles chart, thanks to ever-changing data collecting methods. When the 1960s decade opened, there were but four No. 1 songs topping the chart (five, if one counts Marty Robbins' "El Paso"), but by the mid-1960s, there were always at least a dozen songs topping the chart annually. In 1967, there were more than 20 songs reaching the top spot for the first time ever in a single calendar year ... and that number would only continue to rise during the next 20 years.

Toward the end of the decade, modern fashion trends began to make its way into country music circles. This was specifically inspired by a song, "Harper Valley PTA," written by singer/songwriter Tom T. Hall about a miniskirt-wearing widowed mother of a teenage girl who was criticized by local school officials for supposedly setting a bad example for her daughter. The song was recorded by a young secretary named Jeannie C. Riley, who developed a mod persona in connection with the song by performing onstage in short skirts and go-go boots. Other female country artists began to follow suit in the years that followed, also appearing onstage in miniskirts and minidresses. The song reached both the country and pop charts in 1968; and to this day, "Harper Valley PTA" remains the most requested song in Riley's concerts.

It was attention to detail in songs like "Harper Valley PTA" that made Hall one of the genre's most renowned songwriters, starting in mid-1960s, and earned him the nickname "The Storyteller." His first hits were as a songwriter, with "Hello Vietnam," recorded by Johnnie Wright (husband of Kitty Wells), becoming Hall's first songwriting No. 1 single in 1965. By the late 1960s, Hall began having hits of his own, with songs like "The Ballad Of Forty Dollars" and "Homecoming" both becoming top-10 hits and showcasing his storytelling talents, and that success continued throughout the 1970s and into the 1980s.

=== Other trends and musical events ===
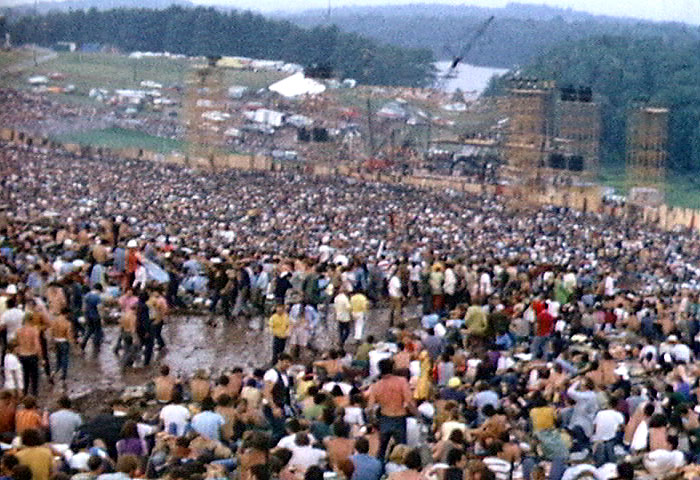
Woodstock Festival, August 1969

- Late in the decade, the Monterey Pop Festival and Woodstock Music Festival would epitomize the American counterculture.
- Current events become a major influence on popular music. Many songs are written in protest to the Vietnam War. The song "Ohio" was written about the Kent State Massacre, and became a hit for Crosby, Stills, Nash and Young.
- World music sees a huge rise in popularity as many seek interest in other cultures. Ravi Shankar performs at the Monterey and Woodstock festivals. Latin Rock artist Carlos Santana sees popularity throughout the decade. George Harrison develops an interest in the Hare Krishna culture, adding Indian influence to the Beatles' music including the use of a sitar. Reggae begins to popularize at this time.
- In 1969, the Rolling Stones organized the ill-fated Altamont Free Concert.
- Songs like "Summertime Blues" and "Eve of Destruction" address the issue of the voting age, which at the time was 21. The issue was that soldiers were drafted at 18, but could not vote. The voting age was eventually lowered to eighteen.
- A few songs, such as Phil Ochs's "Here's to the State of Mississippi", address the Civil Rights Movement.

== Latin America, Spain and Brazil ==
=== Bossa Nova ===
This Brazilian musical style, which means "New Trend", had its origins in the upscale neighbourhoods of Rio de Janeiro. Immensely popular in the early 1960s, it was a fusion of samba and cool jazz. Antonio Carlos Jobim, João Gilberto, Astrud Gilberto, and Vinicius de Moraes became some of the best known artists of the Bossa Nova movement. The latter's The Girl From Ipanema, released in 1964, became the first Bossa Nova song to achieve international acclaim. In 1965, it won a Grammy Award for Best Record of the Year. Another prominent Latin pop group was Sergio Mendes and Brazil '66. Their songs included Mas Que Nada, The Joker, and Agua de Beber. In 1966 the group was nominated for a Grammy award for Best Performance by a Duo or Musical Group. They eventually became Sergio Mendes and Brazil '77, and continued playing their brand of Latin pop into that decade.

=== Romantics ===
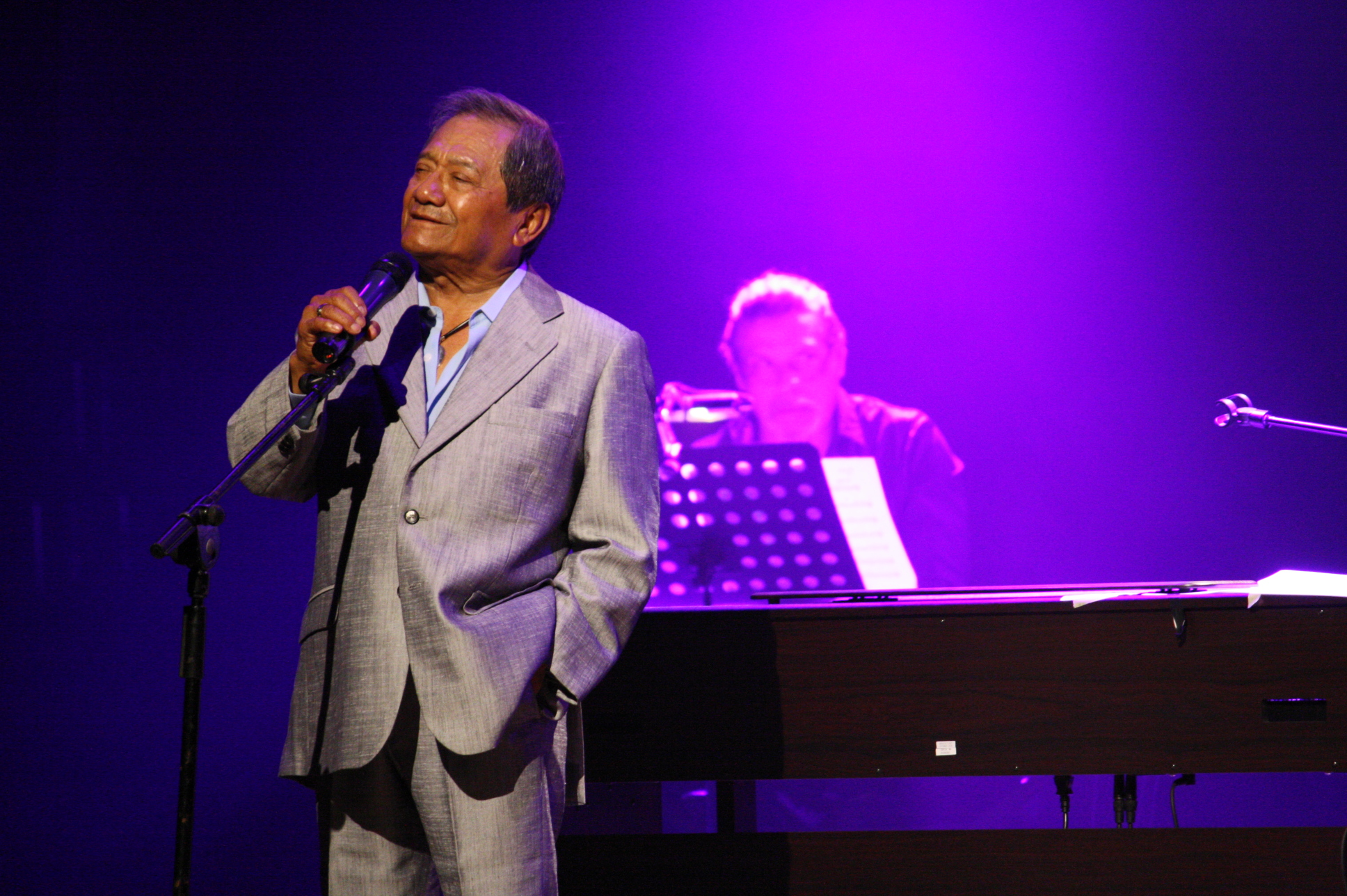
Armando Manzanero

Another composer Armando Manzanero widely considered the premier Mexican romantic composer of the postwar era and one of the most successful composers of Latin America has composed more than four hundred songs, fifty of which have given him international fame. His most famous songs include Voy a apagar la luz (I'm Going to Turn Off the Lights), Contigo Aprendí (With you I Learnt... ), Adoro (Adore), No sé tú (I don't know if you...), Por Debajo de la Mesa (Under the Table) Esta Tarde Vi Llover (English version "Yesterday I Heard the Rain"), Somos Novios (English version "It's Impossible"), Felicidad (Happiness) and Nada Personal (Nothing Personal).

Some renowned trios romantics were Trio Los Panchos, Los Tres Ases, Los Tres Diamantes and Los Dandys. Trio Bolero, a unique ensemble of two guitars and one cello. Other singers in singing boleros in Mexico are Óscar Chávez, José Ángel Espinoza and Álvaro Carrillo.

=== Nueva ola ===
It was during the 60s that rock music began to gain acclaim in Latin America. In Spanish speaking South America musicians who adopted US and British inspired rock, mainly rock and roll, twist and British Invasion music, were collectively labelled as Nueva ola (Spanish for "New Wave"). Argentina, having his own Rock and Roll and British Invasion inspired bands and artist, Sandro de América, Sandro y Los de Fuego, Johnny Allon, Los Gatos Salvajes, Los Beatniks, Los Buhos, among others. suffered the Uruguayan Invasion, a series of British Invasion inspired rock bands from Montevideo that moved to Buenos Aires and soon became popular in Argentina Los Shakers, Los Mockers, Los Iracundos. Rock music during the 60s was still largely sung in English, but some bands like Los Mac's and others mentioned above used Spanish for their songs as well. During the 1960s, most of the music produced in Mexico consisted on Spanish-language versions of English-language rock-and-roll hits. Singers and musical groups like Angelica Maria, César Costa, Enrique Guzmán performed cover versions of songs by Elvis Presley, Nancy Sinatra, Paul Anka and others.

=== Nueva canción ===
During the 1960s Nueva Canción emerges and starts to expand its influence. This development is pioneered by the Chileans Violeta Parra and Víctor Jara who base many of their songs in folklore, specially cueca. Nueva Canción spreads quickly all over Latin America and becomes closely related to the New Left and the Liberation theology movements. In Francisco Franco's Spain Joan Manuel Serrat reaches widespread notability as an exponent of Nueva Canción and of the political opposition.

=== Salsa ===
Even though salsa music began to take form in a New York scene dominated by Cubans and other Latin American communities, Salsa would not become popular all across Latin America until the late 1980s and is now here today.

=== Tango ===
Astor Piazzolla won the First Ibero American Music Festival in 1966 with the song "Balada para un loco", that launched him worldwide introducing his New Tango style Nuevo Tango

=== Música cebolla ===
Música cebolla, a style of music loaded with sentimentality, had its heyday in Chile despite being derided or ignored by mass media.

== Australia and New Zealand ==
The 1960s saw increasing interest in how electronic music could solve both compositional and more practical problems. Composers were also absorbing ideas from overseas, such as indeterminacy and electro-acoustic music, and interpreting them in an Australian context to mixed responses from local audiences.

Early in the decade, Bruce Clarke began toying with the new Moog synthesizer. A musicians' strike led him to create a completely electronic soundtrack for a cigarette commercial in 1963. Innovative film makers, like Arthur Cantrill and Dušan Marek, employed tape manipulation, turntables and extended instrument techniques to create soundtracks for their short films. Avowed amateur and Melbourne physician, Val Stephen, became the first Australian to have electronic music released internationally.

After working among the musical avant-garde in Paris, Keith Humble's return to Australia helped to encourage educational institutions to take electronic music seriously. Humble's most notably experimental work was his Nunique series. These vast multimedia events featured simultaneous performances by rock bands, string quartets and theatre ensembles, all according to precise flowcharts.

Humble initiated the Melbourne-based Society for the Private Performance of New Music in 1966, providing a supportive performance space for young innovators both in and outside the academy. Among these were the McKimm/Rooney/Clayton trio, who, since the 1964, had been incorporating graphic scores and aspects of serialism into jazz improvisation. Jazz was radicalizing at the fringes: John Sangster explored free jazz concepts and Charlie Munro incorporated Eastern musical elements. Syd Clayton would leave jazz behind in pursuit of a new form of experimental music theatre that incorporated chance operations along with sports and games as musical structures.

Young composers, like David Ahern, emerged, initially inspired by ideas of the European avant-garde, and applying them to Australian icons, such as Captain Cook and Ned Kelly. Ahern would travel to Europe later in the 1960s, where he encountered Stockhausen and Cardew, before returning home with further more radical ideas that questioned the very premises of composer and music itself.

== Legacy ==
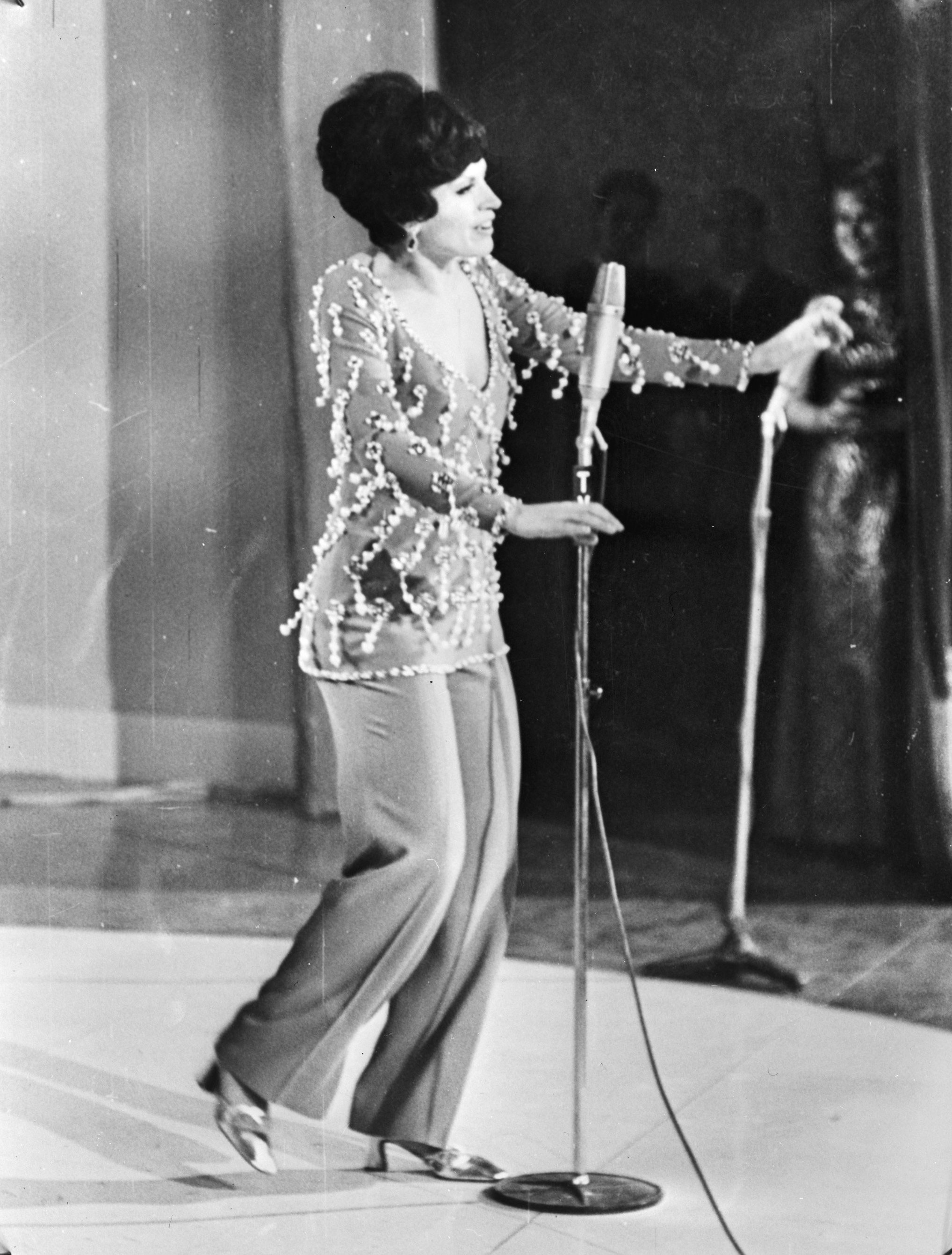
Salome singing Vivo cantando

It is difficult to determine the lasting impact of 1960s music in popular culture. A 2010 European survey conducted by the digital broadcaster Music Choice, interviewing over 11,000 participants, rated the decade rather low, with only 19% declaring it the best tune decade in the last 50 years, while participants of an American land line survey rated the 1960s a bit higher, with 26% declaring it as best decade in music.

The song Vivo cantando was joint winner of the Eurovision Song Contest with the United Kingdom's "Boom Bang-a-Bang" performed by Lulu, "De troubadour" by Lenny Kuhr representing the Netherlands, and "Un jour, un enfant" sung for France by Frida Boccara. It was Spain's second winning entry in the contest and the last to date.

== See also ==
- Timeline of musical events
- List of 1960s musical artists
- 1970s in music
- 1950s in music
