= Taste of Blues =

Swedish rock band

Taste of Blues was a progressive rock band in Sweden, active in the 1960s.

== History ==
The band Taste of Blues was formed in 1967, in Malmö, Sweden, by musicians Claes Ericsson, who played keyboards and violin, and who would later be part of the 1970s "eclectic" rock band Lotus; vocalist Anders Stridsberg; guitarist Fred Rolf Berg; bassist Robert Moller; and drummer Patrick Erixson.

In 1969, and after American vocalist Don Washington had replaced Anders Stridsberg, the band recorded their only album Schizofrenia (SSR LP501). Taste of Blues dissolved shortly after, and Ericsson along with Erixson formed progressive, hard rock band Asoka.

The album Schizofrenia was re-released in 1992 by Swedish, vinyl label Garageland and in CD form by Transubstans Records.
