= Cool Silly =

Taiwanese-American pop music trio

- Born: Republic of China (Taiwan)
- Years active: 2008–2011
- Musical career
- Origin: Republic of China (Taiwan)
- Genre: Mandopop
- Instruments: Vocal, Violin, Guitar, Piano, Keyboard, Drums
- Label: AsiaMuse Entertainment 亞神音樂 Warner Music Entertainment 華納唱片公司
- Members: Tone (Tony Chung) (Guitar, Vocals); Leeway Lan (Rapper, Violin)
- Past members: Ray Liu (Lead Vocals)
- Website: Cool Silly Official Website

Cool Silly (Chinese: 傻酷; pinyin: Shǎ kù) was a Taiwanese-American mainstream pop trio consisting of producer/singer Tone (仲維軍) and rapper/actor Leeway(藍立威), and singer/composer Ray Liu (劉軒蓁). Renowned artist Tone (仲維軍) formed this band after releasing his first album titled "我的6:57am" (My 6:57 AM), and recruited two other members to form Cool Silly. In 2011, because the band decided that Ray Liu's musical style is more suitable on her own, Cool Silly became a duo consisting Tony Chung and Leeway Lan. Ray Liu later on pursued music production with her own musical style.

The band was well known throughout Taiwan in 2010 with their hit "Fly" (我飛), which was the theme song for the 2010 Taipei International Flora Exposition( 2010 臺北國際花卉博覽會). The song attracted many fans, which led to Cool Silly's debut in 2010 with the release of their first digital album, Cool Silly: The Prelude. Since their debut, they have often been compared with the Popular Taiwanese rock group F.I.R. because of the similar formation of band members and attractive performance personalities.

In late 2010, Cool Silly was invited by the Taipei City Government to write and produce a song to reflect the beauty and hope of Taipei City as the theme song of the heavily promoted Taipei City Mayor Hau Lung-pin's "MyWish" campaign. The resulting tune, “Light Up Your Dreams”, was later distributed as an EP single in Apple Weekly Magazine and promoted on various internet channels.

The name Cool Silly comes from the band's ideology that "a person can't be cool unless they're silly as well". The band insists that the personality of their music is not only "cool," but at the same time "silly."

== Member profiles ==
- Guitarist/Lead Vocal
  - Stage name: Tone (仲維軍)
  - Birthplace: Austin, Texas
  - Birth date: December 1, 1983 (age 42)
  - Musical Instrument: Guitar, Keyboard, arranging music on the computer
- Rapper/Violinist
  - Stage name: Leeway (Leeway, 藍立威)
  - Birthplace: Queens, New York
  - Birth date: June 26, 1983 (age 43)
  - Musical Instruments: Violin, Guitar, keyboard, piano

(Previous Member)

  - Stage name: RayRay (劉軒蓁)(Placed 11th on the second season of the popular Taiwanese talent show Super Star Avenue 超級星光大道 (第二屆))
  - Birthplace: Taipei, Taiwan
  - Birth date: May 30, 1985 (age 41)
  - Time with band: October 19, 2009 ~ January 14, 2011

== Discography ==
Cool Silly (傻酷) discography
- Studio albums: 2
- Extended plays: 2
- Soundtrack albums: 2
- Singles: 2

=== Studio albums ===
Date Released	Album title
February 10, 2010	Cool Silly: The Prelude 傻酷: 我飛

Date Released	Album title
October 28, 2010	Light Up Your Dreams 夢想發光

=== Singles ===
- Fly(我飛) (October, 2009)
- Light Up Your Dreams(夢想發光) (November, 2011)

== Trivia ==
- Rapper/Violinist Leeway, was planning on attending Western State University College of Law after graduating from CSU Fullerton in 2006. He decided to commit to a career in the Asian entertainment industry instead during a vacation visit to Taipei.
- Tone starred in the US independent film "Binary City" in 2006. He played the lead role of "Tony".
- In June 2009, Leeway was cast as superstar David Tao's best friend in his director/producer romantic music movie, "Secret Love" (暗戀). Leeway also played the part of "Jerry" in the music video "Play" for David Tao's album Opus 69.
- Tone is the CEO and creator of the popular website GeekWhat?.
