= Frances & Aiko =

Taiwanese musical duo

Frances & Aiko 大小姐
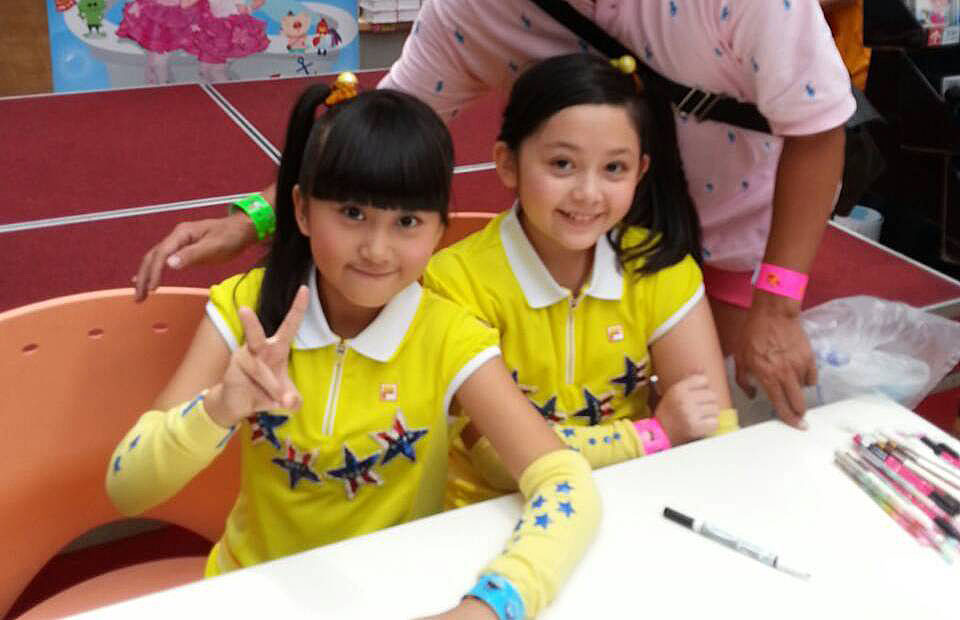
- Frances & Aiko at an autograph event for "Follow Me" in 2013

Background information
- Also known as: Big Small Sister
- Origin: Taiwan
- Genres: Mandopop
- Years active: 2009-2013
- Labels: Forward Music
- Past members: Frances Wu; Aiko Lan

Chinese name
- Chinese: 大小姐
Transcriptions
Standard Mandarin
- Hanyu Pinyin: Dà Xiǎo Jie
- Wade–Giles: Ta Hsiao Chieh

Frances & Aiko (Chinese: 大小姐; Japanese: フランシス＆愛子) was a Taiwanese pop music duo signed under Forward Music in 2009 as a part of the Hello! Project name under their overseas group, Hello! Project Taiwan. The members consisted of Frances Wu and Aiko Lan, two finalists of the Hello! Project New Star Audition.

== History ==
In 2007, Japanese idol network Hello! Project held the Hello! Project New Star Audition to recruit members for a new girl group based in Taiwan in an attempt to expand towards the Chinese market, which would eventually lead towards the creation of Ice Creamusume. Frances and Aiko were finalists in the audition, and despite being too young to pass, Tsunku saw potential in them and put them in their own group, known as Big Small Sister. Unlike Ice Creamusume, Big Small Sister promoted primarily in Taiwan with Chinese-language songs, and there were no plans for them to promote in Japan.

Big Small Sister received dancing lessons in Japan and performed with Koharu Kusumi during a concert in February 2009.

In September 2009, Big Small Sister released their first mini album, I Am Big Small Sister. The mini album was received so favorably that a repackaged version, I Am Big Small Sister: Year of the Tiger version, was released in 2010.

In October 2009, Big Small Sister were invited as guests at the World Peace Day press conference in Taipei. This was followed by the release of their first album, Go For It! Big Small Sister. in 2011.

In 2012, Big Small Sister decided to disband to focus on school after agreement from their parents and management. After leaving Hello! Project, Big Small Sister released their final album, Follow Me, in 2013.

== Discography ==
=== Studio albums ===
Year	Information	Track listing
2011	加加油！大小姐 (Go For It! Big Small Sister): Released: January 26, 2011; Label: Forward Music	Songs: 1. "起立敬禮坐下 (Stand Up and Salute)"; 2. "加加油 (Go For It)"; 3. "怪獸Lonely (Lonely Monster)"; 4. "對面的男孩看過來 (Hey Boy Look This Way)"; 5. "老師老師第三集 (Teacher, Teacher Part Three)" (with Bright Pu); 6. "加加油大小姐 (Go For It! Big Small Sister)"
2013	Follow Me: Released: July 30, 2013; Label: Forward Music	Songs: 1. "Follow Me (發落密)"; 2. "LOVE"; 3. "登大人 (Growing Up)"; 4. "麻吉寶貝 (My Baby)"; 5. "愛心大無限 (Infinite Love)"; 6. "香香澡 (Fragrant Bath)"; 7. "大小姐進行曲 (Big Small Sister March)"

=== Extended plays ===
Year	Information	Track listing
2009	我是大小姐 (I Am Big Small Sister): Released: September 15, 2009; Label: Forward Music	Songs: 1. "大小姐 (Big Small Sister)"; 2. "老師老師(Teacher, Teacher)"; 3. "媽媽的話 (What Mama Says)"; 4. "GO GO Girl"; 5. "童話故事 (Fairytale)"
2010	我是大小姐虎虎生風賀年版 (I Am Big Small Sister: Year of the Tiger version): Released: February 3, 2010; Label: Forward Music	Songs: 1. "Bling Bling過新年 (Bling Bling New Year)"; 2. "老師老師之虎虎生風賀年版 (Teacher, Teacher: Year of the Tiger Version)"; 3. "大小姐 (Big Small Sister)"; 4. "老師老師 (Teacher, Teacher)"; 5. "媽媽的話 (What Mama Says)"; 6. "GO GO Girl"; 7. "童話故事 (Fairytale)"
