= Los Mockers =

Uruguayan rock band

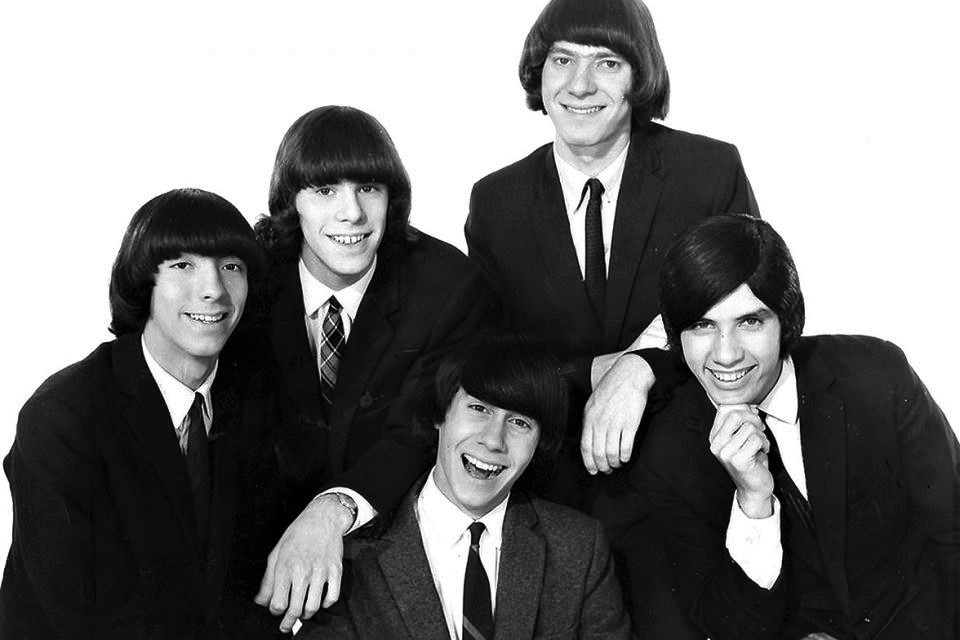

Background information
- Origin: Montevideo, Uruguay
- Genres: Rock; Garage rock Beat Music; Nueva ola
- Years active: 1963–1967; 2008– Present
- Labels: EMI
- Members: Polo Pereira (lead vocals, guitar); Jorge Fernández (backing vocals, guitar); Esteban Hirshfield (backing vocals, organ, harmonica); Julio Montero (vocals, bass guitar); Beto Freigeda (drums)

Los Mockers were a popular 1960s rock band in Latin America that was part of the Uruguayan Invasion. They were heavily influenced by The Rolling Stones and covered many of their songs (in English). The band was formed in 1963 in Montevideo, Uruguay but moved to Argentina in 1966 after winning a contract with EMI Argentina. The original lineup disbanded in 1967. They briefly re-united in 2006.

== History ==
The band formed in 1963. They were originally called The Notorious before being renamed The Mockers.

In 1966, they won a recording contract with EMI of Argentina, so they recorded their first single in April, and in September, recorded "I want to go" and "Baby Mine", which were not included in the LP that would be published later. A month later they released their next single, entitled "Empty Harem" / "Let me try again."

Their third single, "Captain Grey" / "Confusion" was released in mid- 1967, to boost sales of the album. Although keyboardist Stephen Hirshfield, had already left the training, he traveled from Montevideo to participate in the recording. The original lineup would disbanded in 1967. They returned to Buenos Aires, for a series of programs on Channel 9. The record company proposed to re-record them on the condition that change their original name, but the group refused as there was no contract signed. With little work and economic issues, plus internal conflicts among its members, vocalist Polo Pereira left and was quickly replaced by pianist and singer Carlos Franzeti.

On September 23 of 2006, forty years on from first recording, Mockers met in Valencia (Spain), with all their original members, except Freigeda Beto, who died in a traffic accident early in 1972 in Montevideo. Over the years there were several edited collections of their whole discography; among them are "The Original Recordings 1965-1967" and "Complete Recordings".

== Band members ==
- Polo Pereira (guitar, vocals)
- Jorge Fernández (guitar, backing vocals)
- Esteban Hirschfield (organ, backing vocals, harmonica)
- Julio Montero (bass, vocals)
- Beto Freigeda (drums)

== Discography ==
=== Singles ===
- Quiero irme/Nena mía (1966)
- Empty Harem/Let me try again (1966)
- Captain Grey/Confusion (1967)

=== Albums ===
- Los Mockers (1966)
- Los Mockers II (1968)

== See also ==
- Los Shakers
