= Uruguayan Invasion =

Musical phenomenon of the 1960s

The Uruguayan Invasion was a musical phenomenon of the 1960s similar to the British Invasion, with rock bands from Uruguay gaining popularity in Argentina.

== History ==
Inspired by British bands like The Beatles and The Rolling Stones, many young musicians in Montevideo, Uruguay began to imitate their sounds. Two bands in particular, Los Shakers and Los Mockers mirrored The Beatles and The Rolling Stones respectively. Popular bands of the Uruguayan Invasion sang mostly in English.

In the mid-1960s, as the British Invasion was at its height in the United States, Uruguayan bands began a similar rise to fame in Argentina. Record labels began rapidly signing Uruguayan rock bands to promote in Argentina. Argentine television shows like Escala Musical were also a springboard for many of the bands' popularity.

Like the British Invasion, the Uruguayan Invasion had died down by the late 1960s, as it became more popular to record harder-hitting Spanish-language music. Spurred on by the band Los Gatos's 1967 hit record "La Balsa", most bands began to record in Spanish. With the coming of the military dictatorship in 1973, the Uruguayan Invasion effectively ended.

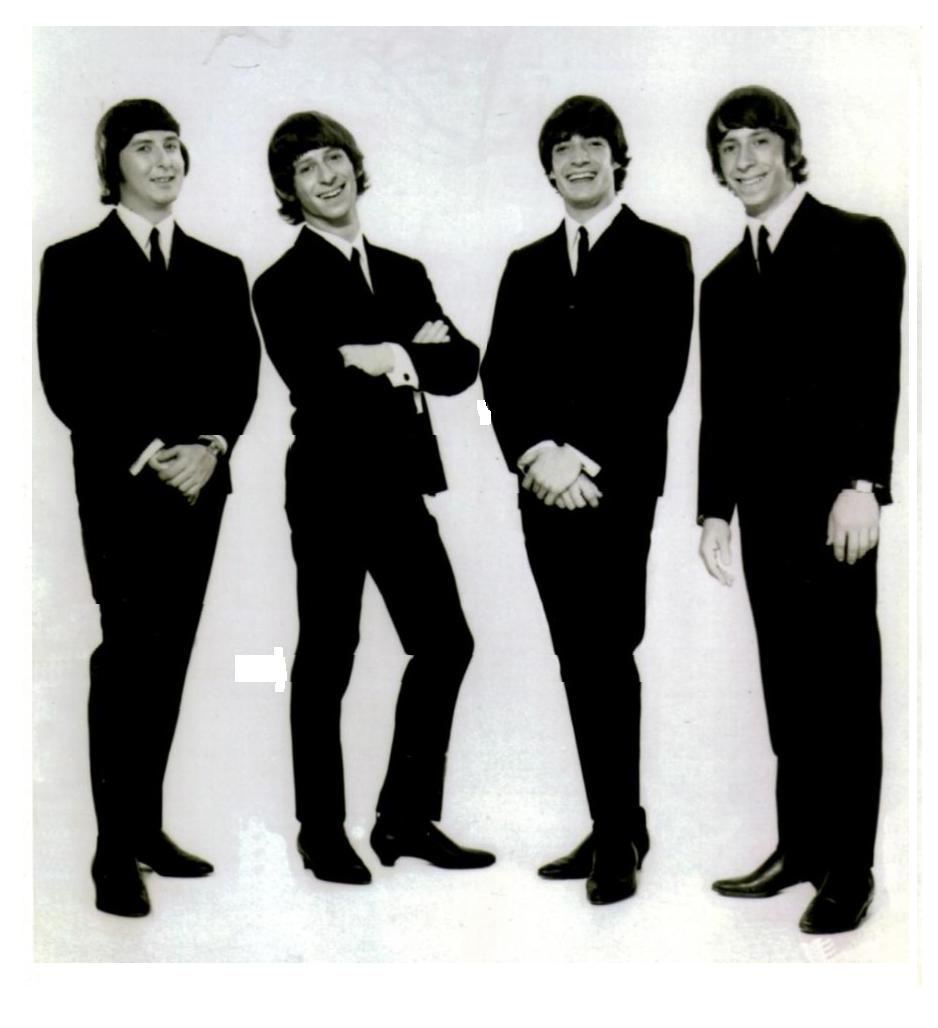
Los Shakers, 1965.

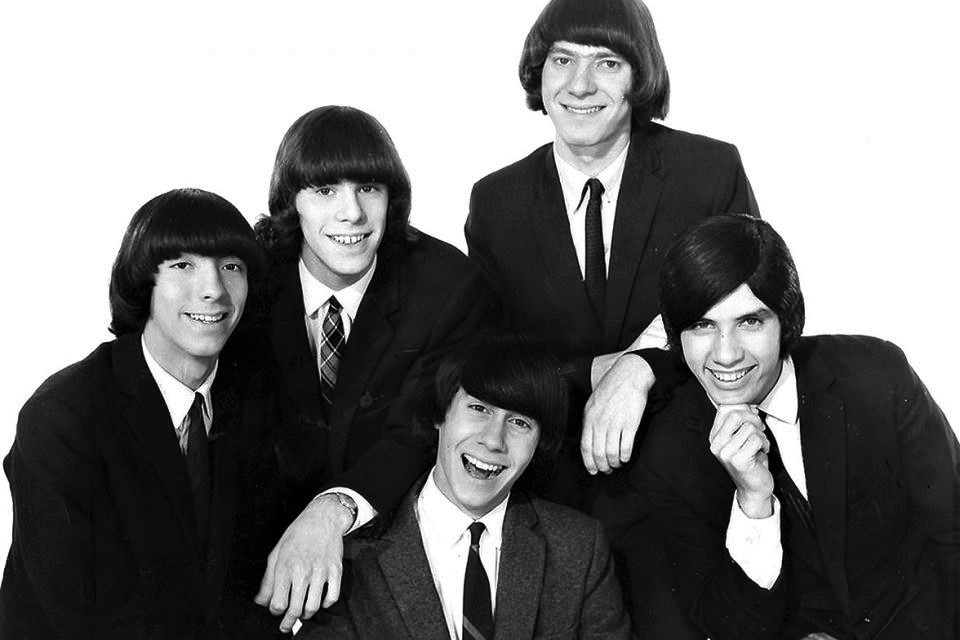
Los Mockers, 1965

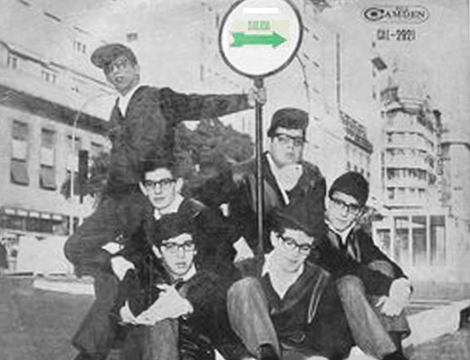
Los Iracundos, 1965

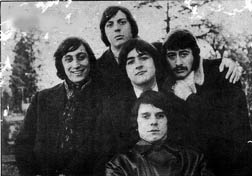
Kano y Los Bulldogs, 1989

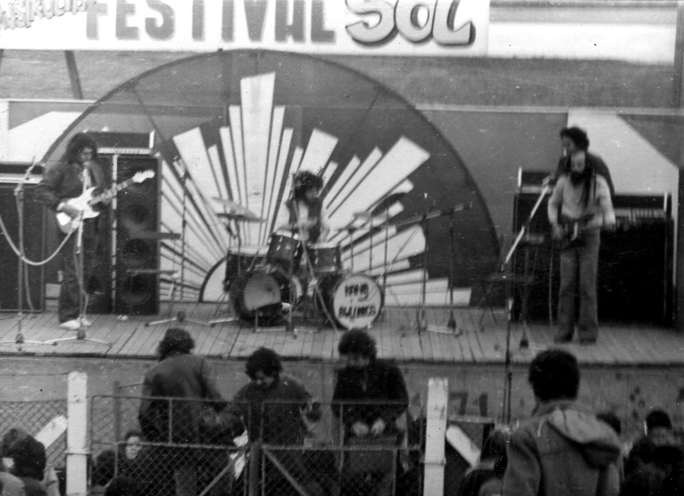
Días de Blues, 1972

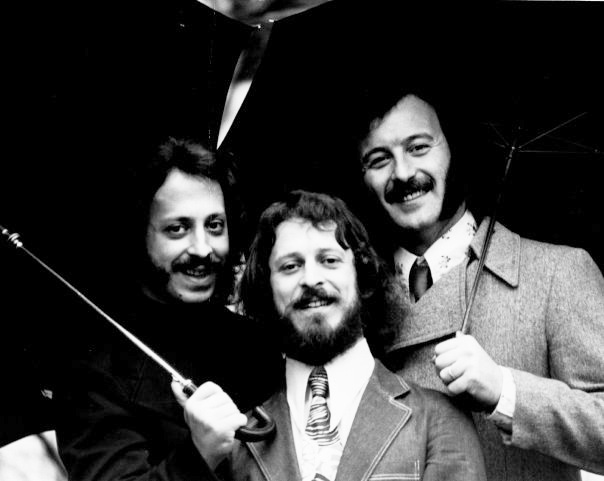
Opa, 1981

== Uruguayan Invasion bands ==
- Los Shakers
- Los Malditos
- Los Mockers
- Kano y Los Bulldogs

== See also ==
- Uruguayan rock
- Argentine rock
- Korean Wave
- Taiwanese Wave
- Garage rock
