= Uruguayan rock =

Rock music made in or associated with Uruguay

- Stylistic origins: Blues, jazz, rock and roll
- Cultural origins: Early 1960s Montevideo, Paysandu

Subgenres
- Candombe Beat, Candombe Rock, Murga Rock

Fusion genres
- Jazz Rock, Latin Jazz

Regional scenes
- Uruguay Montevideo

Other topics
- Discodromo Show

Uruguayan rock first emerged in Uruguay in the 1950s. The real breakthrough for rock in Uruguay, however, as in much of the world, came with the arrival of The Beatles in the early 1960s. Although the country has a small population and is far-removed from the world's cultural centres, rock music from this land, which has always taken on an identity forged from a mix of different cultures (especially, Argentina's and Brazil's, due to proximity) and local peculiarities, crossing different genres and styles, has largely been a well-kept secret outside the region. Thanks to the Internet and easy access to music libraries through streaming services such as Spotify, this is now changing.

== 1960s: The Beatles and the Uruguayan Invasion ==
The Beatles were wildly popular across the world, and many Uruguayan youths began to form their own rock bands. In the mid-1960s, as the British Invasion was peaking in the United States, Canada, Australia and elsewhere, a group of Uruguayan bands broke into the mainstream in Argentina. This cultural phenomenon was called the Uruguayan Invasion, and it continued for several years, as record labels began signing Uruguayan bands to promote them in Argentina.

Los Shakers were a group formed in the mid-1960s, as a response to The Beatles, after a group of youngsters had seen A Hard Day's Night. Although in essence they started as a carbon copy of the Fab Four, Los Shakers became very popular across Latin America and were a big influence on many musicians that followed them. Their second album, Shakers for You (1966) followed the same trend as the Beatles, moving towards psychedelia, but also with original touches, including nods to Bossa Nova, especially with the song Never, Never, a big hit in Brazil, and "probably an inspiration for the Tropicalia movement that arose in Brazilian music at the time.".

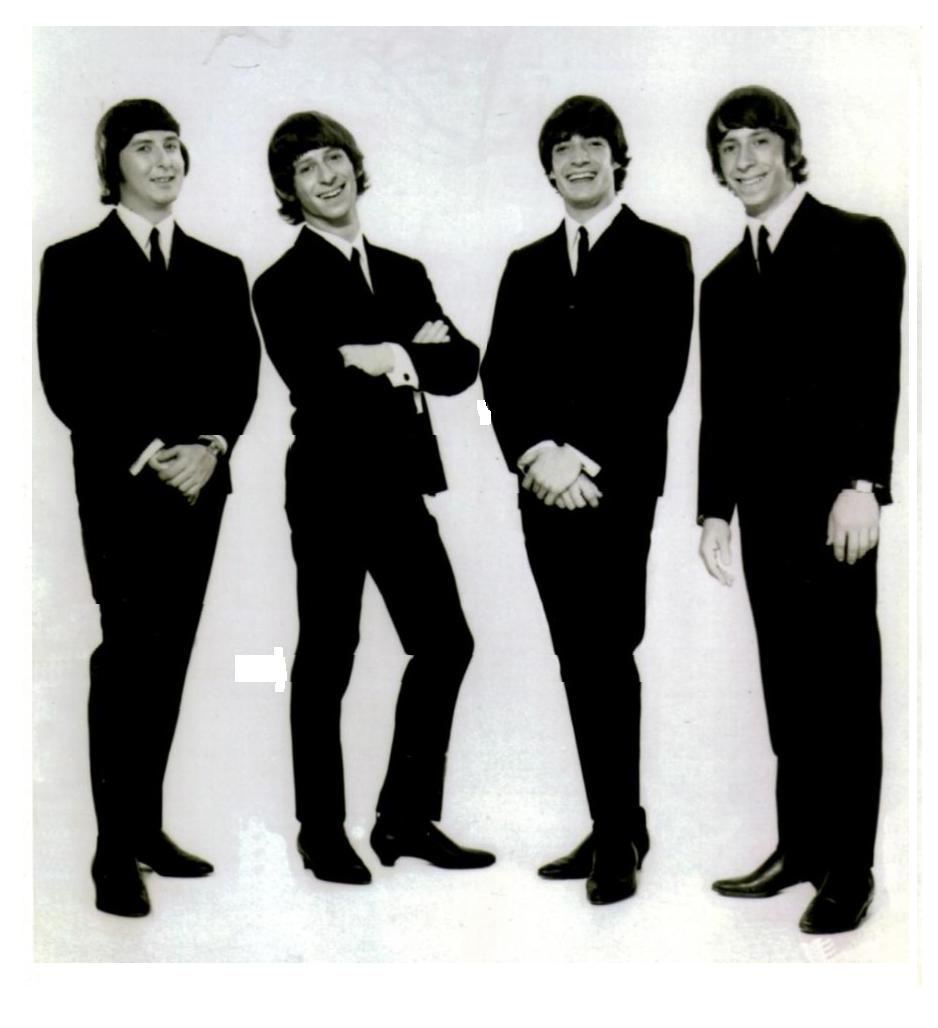
Los Shakers (Break it All)1965.

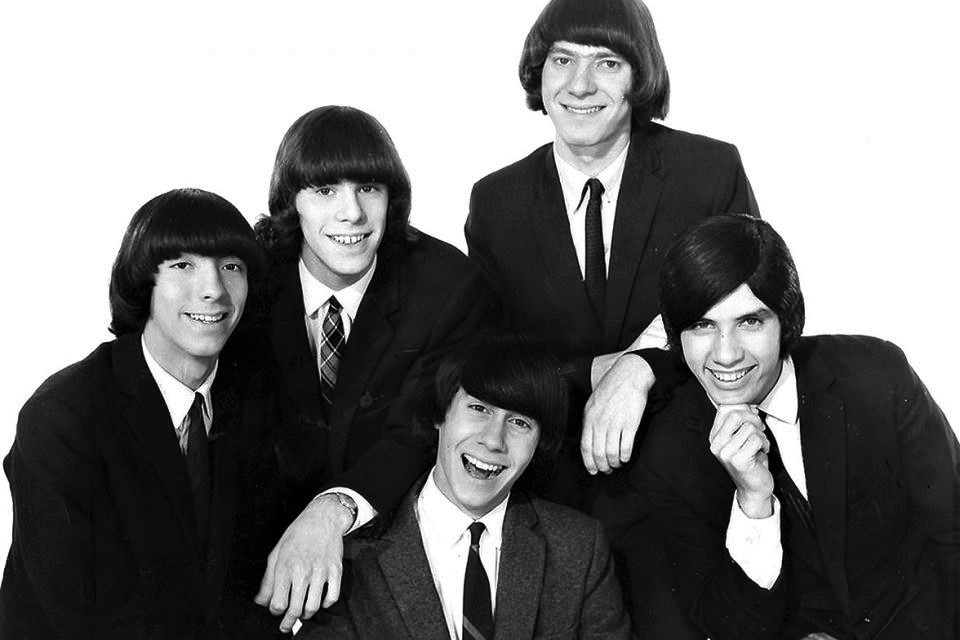
Los Mockers 1965

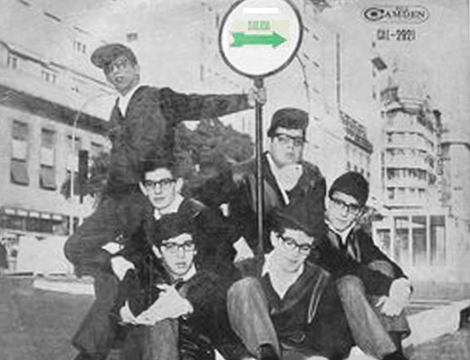
Los Iracundos 1965

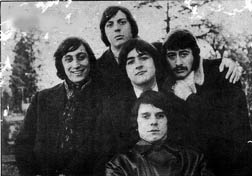
Kano y Los Bulldogs

Like Los Shakers, the other bands that emerged in Uruguay at this time, did not want to just sound like their British counterparts, but to create a more original sound. Examples include Los Iracundos, Kano y Los Bulldogs, and Los Malditos. Los Mockers are not an example of this, however. Deeply influenced by The Rolling Stones, there "was no trace of any local or regional personality" in their work, although its members where considered talented performers and arrangers.

== 1970-1973 Uruguayan Rock Boom ==
With the Uruguayan Invasion of Argentina dying down, a new wave of rock musicians arose, including members of El Kinto, Tótem, Psiglo, Génesis, Opus Alfa, Eduardo Mateo, Jesus Figueroa and Días de Blues, promoted by radio and television shows like Constelacion and Discodromo Show.

Gastón Ciarlo (aka Dino) was a rock music pioneer in Uruguay, playing electric blues before the Beatles revolution, and blending pop music and local rhythms and themes. He dabbled in candombe like Eduardo Mateo and El Kinto, adopting a rock attitude on the 1970 release Underground and mixing styles such as milonga. The songs are introduced by enigmatic words and the sound of casual conversation can be heard in the background. 1970 also saw Eduardo Mateo dissolve El Kinto and two of its members, guitarist Walter Cambón and drummer Luis Sosa, formed LimoNada, a short-lived project that was rediscovered in the 1990s thanks to its extremely unconventional sound, boasting songs "clustered by strange voices, incidental music noises and effects that sometimes unite the songs and other times cut the tunes in half".

The emerging Uruguayan rock scene showed musicians searching for a new Latin American cultural identity at the beginning of the 1970s. Tótem, founded by Ruben Rada and Eduardo Useta was an attempt to establish this, and their 1971 self-titled debut showed songwriting talent and vocal virtuosity and helped make the band become one of the most successful Uruguayan bands, leaving an enormous legacy for the future of Uruguayan music.

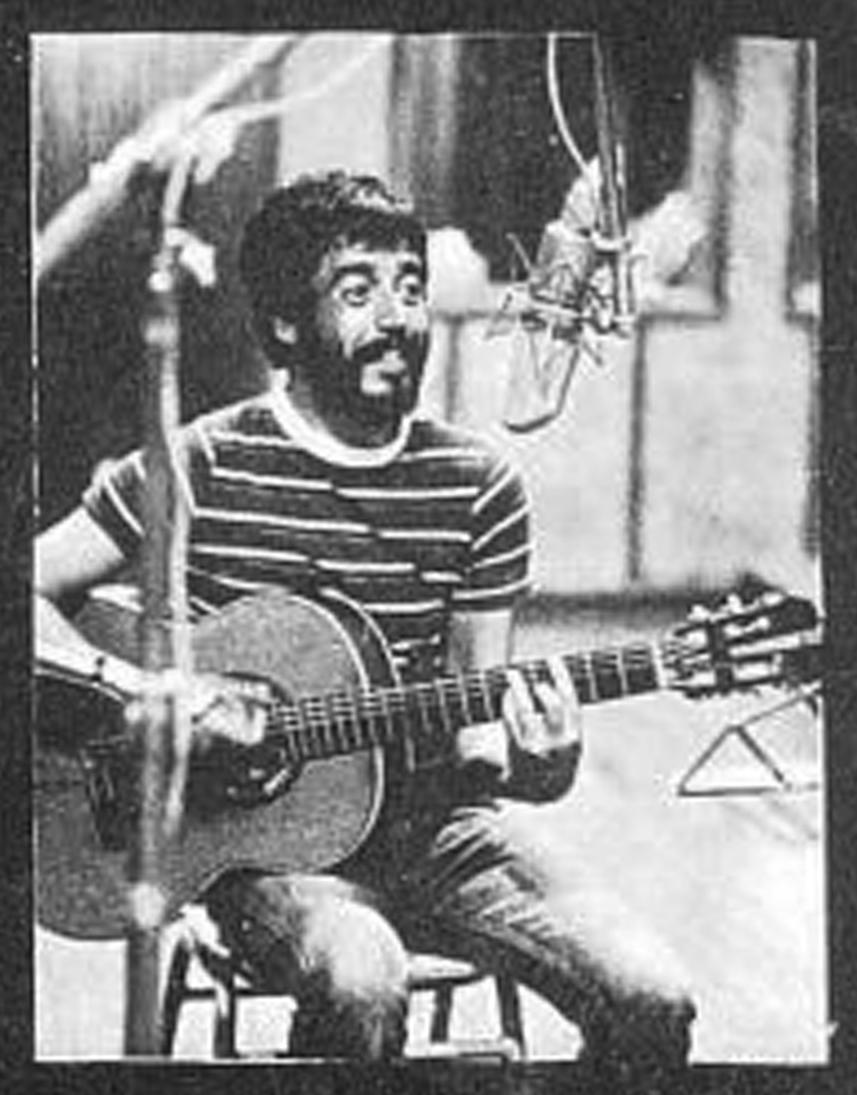
Eduardo Mateo 1971

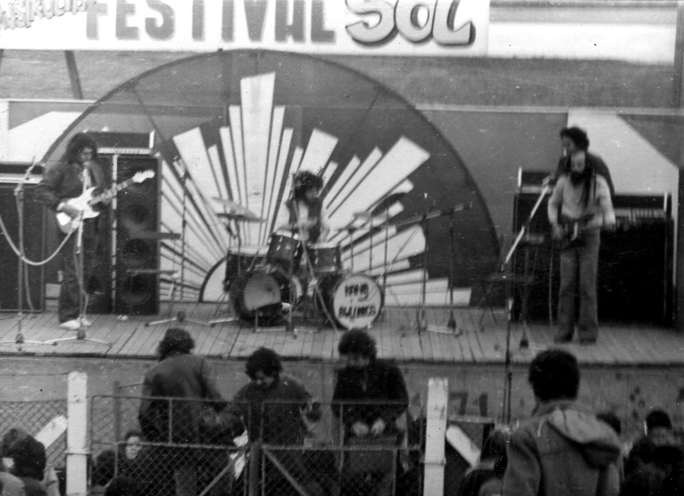
Dias de Blues 1972

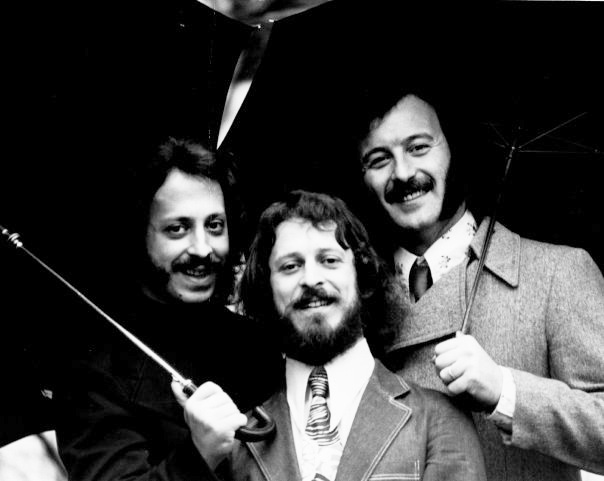
OPA Uruguayan Band in USA 1972

Apart from Tótem, the Uruguayan hard rock band Psiglo was able to cross over from the underground and reach a large audience. Inspired by Deep Purple and Uriah Heep, Psiglo was formed in 1971 and reached their height with their debut album Ideación, released in 1973. Their leftish politics and rebellious attitude meant it was impossible for them to continue after the 1973 military coup, and their second album did not see the light of day until 1981, because the military authorities threatened to close the record company down if it was released at the time.

== 1973-1979: Uruguayan Rock Bottom ==
In 1973 the military dictatorship came to rule Uruguay, and the rock boom ended. In 1975, popular music came to be dominated by canto popular, a genre that was against and openly dismissed electric instrumentations and foreign rhythm and styles.

== 1980-1984: Breaking the status quo of the dictatorship ==
Jorge Galemire's first solo album (1981) Presentación, combining acoustic ballads with groovy candombe jazz arrangements along with new pop readings of the Uruguayan murga was a big influence on many artists, although it did not reach a wide public. Galemire emerged from the 1970s Uruguayan rock scene, previously playing with El Syndikato, Carlos Canzani, Eduardo Darnauchans and Eduardo Rivera, playing an important role in breaking the cultural status quo imposed by the dictatorship.

Another influential album, Aquello by Jaime Roos was released in 1981. Moving away from his previous Beatles influenced music, Aquello was recorded in France with a multinational group of musicians, from Uruguay, Argentina, France and the US, and with this recording, Roos began to "bear no resemblance to anybody else but himself" and with a pervading atmosphere of strangeness and diversity, along with "almost perfect songs with incredible melody lines". These followed traditional song formats, but with bolero and Latin American inspired arrangements and the start of Roos's definitive personality. A year later (1982), Roos followed with Siempre son las cuatro, with a rougher and darker quality of tone .

== 1985-1989: The new Uruguayan rock ==
After 1985, with the restoration of democracy, after 12 years of dictatorship, Uruguayan rock was reborn. The new scene was perhaps best represented by Los Estómagos, whose 1985 debut album, Tango que me hiciste mal (1985) "is considered the kick-off of the new Uruguayan rock". Although usually labelled a punk band, the dark tone and minimalist music of Los Estómagos mean they are closer to new wave bands such as Bauhaus and Joy Division, rather than Sex Pistols. The album's particular sound was also due to the use of outdated and poorly equipped Uruguayan recording studios.

In 1985 also the Uruguayan Heavy Metal scene was born with bands like Acido and Alvacast, being Alvacast the first Heavy Metal band to get a record deal in Uruguay. Alvacast recorded their first LP in 1987 called "Al Borde Del Abismo".

Other bands influenced by punk rock and new wave included Traidores, Neoh-23, Zero, La Tabaré Banda and La Chancha Francisca. The scene was alive and well, with shows at underground venues or the series of big concerts known as Montevideo Rock, (where participated the most popular Heavy Metal band called Alvacast) that also included foreign bands. The gloomy sound of this era (post-punk guitars, grim lyrics) found little support in mainstream media. This eighties rock movement slowly weakened and practically vanished. It is generally considered that this period symbolically came to an end in 1989, with the split of Los Estómagos.

Corrección: la banda que edito dentro de la categoría HEAVY METAL en Uruguay. Fué ACIDO. Fonográficamente ese es el 1er. registro.

== 1990s ==
The mid-nineties, with the popularization of compact discs, cable TV and the beginning of the internet saw another generation of Uruguayan bands coming to the surface. El Cuarteto de Nos broke records with their album Otra Navidad en las Trincheras, while Buitres despues de la una (with former Estomagos members) reached a creative peak with Maraviya. A compilation album called Perdidos, released in 2000, documented the whole 1990s underground scene, with songs by bands like Loop Lascano, Kato, Camote, Gnomos, Samurai Porno, Sordromo and Elefante.

Trotsky Vengaran is a very well known band in the inner culture, with over 30 years of career and eleven studio albums they directly compete with Buitres for the audience. Formed in 1991, they published their first album, "Salud, dinero y dinero" (Health, money and more money) in 1994, since then, they have published albums almost once every two years.

In 1995, a band called El Peyote Asesino revitalized the whole scene with their self-titled album and their powerful underground shows. Their music was a mix of hip-hop and hard rock, with influences from Red Hot Chili Peppers and Beastie Boys. Bands like Platano Macho, La Teja Pride, La Abuela Coca (a band inspired by Manu Chao and Mano Negra) and the then beginners La Vela Puerca gave the scene a variety that was unheard of. Deals with big record labels also helped the bands get better sound in their albums, which was a long-time debt of the local scene. Meanwhile, La Trampa gained popularity as their blend of traditional Uruguayan folk and obscure post-punk rock reached airplay and edited well-sold albums like Caída libre.

== 2000s ==
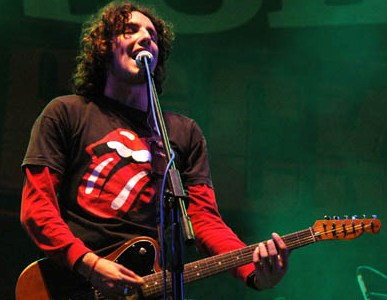
Emiliano Brancciari, from No Te Va Gustar in concert in Montevideo.

In 2001, Buenos Muchachos, a band that started in the 90's in Montevideo's underground rock scene, alongside Chicos Electricos, La Hermana Menor and The Supersonicos, reached maturity with their third album Dendritas contra el bicho feo, with references to bands such as The Velvet Underground and The Stooges as well as borrowing accents from the milonga and tango.

El Peyote Asesino split after their second album, Terraja, while La Vela Puerca's popularity grew as they matured musically from a ska-punk sound to their own identity, blending local sounds as well. In 2003 a band named Astroboy, inspired by Oasis, came out. From 2005, La Vela Puerca and No Te Va Gustar (NTVG) emerged as two of the most popular bands in Uruguay. El Cuarteto de Nos, No Te Va Gustar and La Vela Puerca were also very popular in Argentina, touring throughout the country and playing in local festivals, such as Cosquín Rock, Pepsi Music, etc.

== Contemporary ==
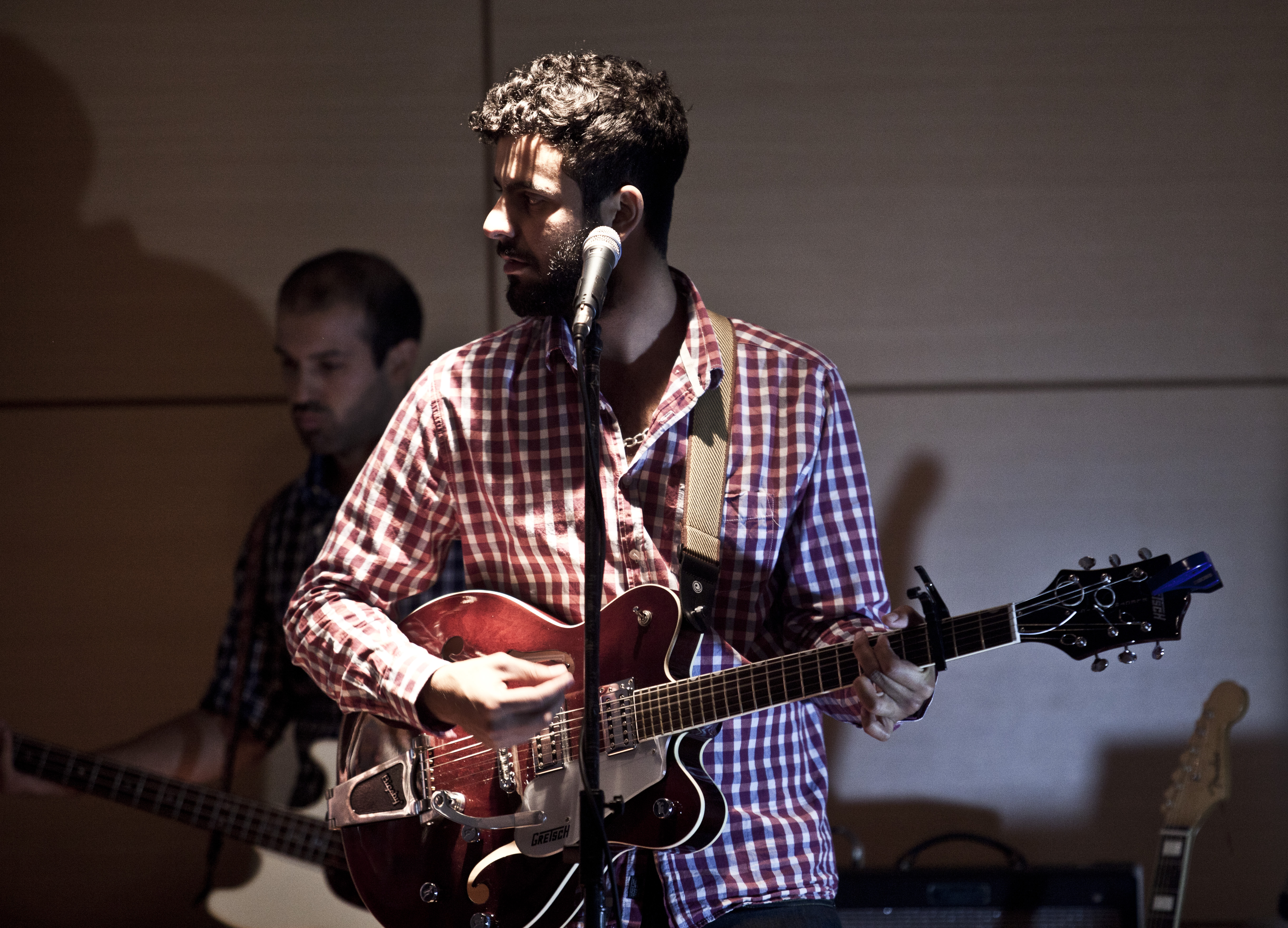
Nicolas Molina of Molina y los Cósmicos playing live.

In general, the most popular bands from previous decades, such as El Cuarteto de Nos, La Vela Puerca, No Te Va Gustar (NTVG), Buenos Muchachos, la Trampa, Buitres and La Tabaré Banda continue to be popular, releasing records and playing live regularly.

A number of new bands have started to attract critical attention including ET y Los Problems and Molina y los Cosmicos, whose independent folk rock with touches of "spaghetti western" and Calexico influences have attracted attention outside the country, partly thanks to tours in Brasil and the USA. Other bands have started to come of age, such as Boomerang, the band that started in 2000 as a Uruguayan Oasis clone, but who have now discovered a mature sound with the release of Engañamundos, recorded in the studio of Argentine band Babasónicos
