= La Trampa (band) =

- La Trampa performing at Plaza Theater, Montevideo

Background information
- Origin: Montevideo, Uruguay
- Genre: Hard rock
- Years active: 1991–2010; 2017–2018; 2027–present
- Label: Bizarro Records/Koala Records
- Members: Alejandro Spuntone (vocals); Garo Arakelian (guitar); Carlos Rafols (bass); Irvin Carballo (drums)
- Past members: Sergio Schellemberg (keyboards); Martín Rosas (vocals); Nicolás Rodríguez (drums); Gabriel Francia (bass); Daniel "Chino" Gonzalez (drums); Álvaro Pintos (drums)
- Website: http://www.latrampa.com.uy

La Trampa is a popular Uruguayan rock band. The band dissolved in 2018, after vocalist Alejandro Spuntone announced his departure. On 23 October 2026, after eight years of separation, the band officially announced their return to the stage with a reunion show titled Canciones al viento, scheduled for 12 May 2027 at the Antel Arena in Montevideo.

== History ==
The original band members were Garo Arakelián (guitar), Alejandro Spuntone (vocals), Irvin Carballo (drums) and Carlos Ráfols (bass).

=== The early years ===
La Trampa appeared on the scene in 1991, formed since winter 1990 by the first two members, architecture students Garo Arakelián and Sergio Schellemberg. In those times the band was formed only by classmates of Garo and Sergio (Martín Rosas 'vocalist', Nicolás Rodríguez 'drums' and Gabriel Francia 'bass').

After a year of work (with Garo and Sergio composing almost every song and all the band rehearsing), La Trampa appeared for the first time on stage, that was on May 3, 1991, in El Tinglado theater (in companion of Cadáveres Ilustres, another Uruguayan band), in those times, the band's manager was Aldo Silva.

Reaching a Uruguayan identity was, since the beginning, one of the goals the band had. "We planned on reaching a well recognizable Uruguayan sound, provided by some urban music aspects with folk features… The sound was fundamental, along with the lyrics that should generate our own 'cosmogony'… build our own world, formed by some fantasy and some of our experiences from life, that was, basically, the intention", said, some years ago, Garo. "Since the beginning, we didn't want to take ourselves apart from the fact of being Uruguayan, (…) but assume it, with courage and proud, as something that was far enough to generate a good artistic product" he added.

In August 1991, they recorded a demo recorded in La Batuta records. It contained four songs: “Arma de doble filo” (a rock version of Gaston ´Dino´Ciarlo's song), “Vals”, “Besos y silencios” and “Madre de flores” (an unedited song). By this way, some of those songs started being emitted in radio, in times where Uruguayan people were not interested in the local rock.

=== First changes ===
A little time later Nicolás Rodríguez left the band and Daniel “Chino” González took his place, taking charge of the drums for the following years.

In 1993 Martín Rosas also left the band and Alejandro Spuntone [who nowadays is the lead singer], took his place. After a few rehearsals with Spuntone, Gabriel Francia announced that he was leaving the band, so a substitute was needed. Therefore, Sergio Schellemberg got in touch with Carlos Ráfols (ADN's ex bassist), to take the open spot in the band. Schellemberg had already invited him when the band was just a project, but he was not seduced by the idea. The second time, and due to a stronger insistence of Sergio, Rafols took part in the band.

The new staff came in scene along with El Cuarteto de Nos, on Friday May 7, 1993, inside the building of the Architecture University (Facultad de Arquitectura) .

== Recordings ==
=== Early works ===
In May 1994 the band started recording "Toca y Obliga" at Estudio Records, the band's first studio album, released by Orfeo in January 1995. The first thousand of discs sold out making it almost impossible to get it until 2005 when Bizarro Records and EMI Music re-edited it.

It took three years of hard work for them to get to record their first album, three years composing, rehearsing and playing live, learning all on stage, even carrying their own instruments and equipment. Three years before getting to talk to Orfeo's Alfonso Carbone who really helped them in the process of recording "Toca y Obliga" This was perhaps the band's most produced album.

Despite being a Rock album, there was a lot of Milonga and some Tango given by the sounds of the Bandoneon played by Edison Bordon.

The album was very well taken by both the critics and public, so it got more attention from the radios who started broadcasting it more frequently. "Dulces Tormentos" was one of the most spread songs of the album.

It was also in 1995 that Daniel "Chino" Gonzalez left the band taking his place for over one year Javier "Pichu" Villanustre, who got to record "En la noche" a cover of Los Estomagos that was included in "Extrañas Visiones" a tribute album to the band along with some other well known performers such as El Peyote Asesino, Claudio Taddei, Los Traidores, The Supersonicos, Eduardo Darnauchans and more.

=== "Calaveras" and scene recognition ===
That December they stopped performing live in order to start composing for what would be their second studio album called Calaveras ("Skulls"), but they had already gone through another change when 'Pichu' Villanustre left the band without someone to take care of drums.

At that time, they were rehearsing at Elepé, Álvaro "Alvin" Pintos's studio. Facing the time to record a new album, and without a drummer they asked Alvin, who at that time already was El Cuarteto de Nos drummer, to learn and make all the rhythmic arrangements to all the new songs in just one week.

In 1997, the band completed their second studio album and performed at the Rock de Aça festival. Despite previewing unreleased material, they received favorable critical and public reception, being cited by both as one of the standout acts of the event.

It was in October that 'Ayui records' released the album, that in just one month sold out its first edition.

Calaveras still has its folk influences, but on the contrary to 'Toca y obliga' where that was shown with the music of the bandoneon now it was the drums that took care of those features with rhythms varying from chacarera and malambo to plain rock and roll, but still the milonga and tango were present in their compositions.

´Calaveras' was awarded as 'best album of the year 1997' by X FM's staff and public.

=== The Resurrection ===
The 1999 released album "Resurreccion" was a more mature work for the band who recorded the album in Argentina. It sounds louder and treats topics like the human being and the world that we live in, a real resurrection for the new millennia. The number of fans of the band grew, and by 2001 La Trampa sold out in well-known performing centers like Teatro de Verano and Plaza Mateo.

By 2001 Sergio Schellemberg left the band, leaving them without keyboard, an instrument that accompanied the band since their foundation.

=== Desencanto ===
On 2008, after a long retreat from the stages, La Trampa had a change in their line-up as Alvaro "Alvin" Pintos left to be a full-time member of El Cuarteto De Nos. He was replaced by Irvin Carballo, and not only their formation changed but also their signature sound. Fans reckon this change in sound as a sell-out since the band approached a more mature and in a way "pop" sound.

That year they released El Mísero Espiral De Encanto.

=== 2026–present: Reunion ===
On 23 October 2026, after an eight-year hiatus following their 2018 dissolution, La Trampa announced their reunion. The trio formed by Alejandro Spuntone, Garo Arakelian, and Irvin Carballo scheduled a major comeback concert titled Canciones al viento for May 12, 13, 15 and 16, 2027, at the Antel Arena in Montevideo.

== Discography ==
Toca y Obliga (1994)

Track list

1. Nada pasa y todo queda
2. Dulces Tormentos
3. Vientos del Sur
4. Besos y Silencios
5. Cancion del Parque
6. El Grito del Diamante
7. Del Adiós
8. Arma de Doble Filo
9. Requiem
10. Por Verte Feliz
11. Aunque Lloren los Muchachos
12. 1973 Milonga Mar

Calaveras (1997)

Track list

1. Calaveras
2. Carne
3. Yo Se Quien Soy
4. Mar de Fondo
5. Las Cruces del Corazón
6. Buena Droga
7. Soledad
8. Los Patios del Alma
9. Los Días de Milagro
10. Frenta a Frente
11. Vals
12. Pensar y Separar

Resurrección (1999)

Track list

1. Guerra en Todas Partes
2. Maldición
3. Vendas en el Corazón
4. Contrapiso para el Alma
5. El Cielo Frente a Mi
6. ¿A dónde vas?
7. Peligro
8. La Claridad
9. Canción 2000
10. Ahuyentando el Miedo
11. Tus Mentiras
12. Resurrección

Caída Libre (2002)

Track list

1. Santa Rosa
2. Caída Libre
3. Los Sueños
4. Cruz Diablo
5. Muere con la Sonrisa
6. Luna de Marzo
7. El Oro y la Maldad
8. Muerte Serena
9. Mi Pobre Final
10. La Mordida
11. Perdidos en Montevideo
12. Si Te Vas

Frente a Frente (Live at Talleres de Don Bosco) (2003)

Track list

1. Las Cruces del Corazón.
2. Calaveras
3. Muerte Serena
4. De Nosotros Dos
5. Vendas en el Corazón
6. Contrapiso Para el Alma
7. Arma de Doble Filo
8. 1973 Milonga Mar
9. Luna de Marzo
10. Dulces Tormentos
11. Por Verte Feliz
12. Peligro
13. El Oro y la Maldad
14. De Despedida
15. Nada Pasa y Todo Queda
16. Caída Libre
17. Mar de Fondo
18. Yo Se Quien Soy

Laberinto (2005)

Track list

1. Puente de Estrellas
2. Las Décimas
3. El Poeta Dice la Verdad
4. Ronda de Lenguas
5. Canciones al Viento
6. Gajo de Luz
7. Sin Piel
8. Araucaria
9. Pensares
10. Alta Mar
11. Los Ojos de Mariam
12. Vagos Recuerdos

El Mísero Espiral De Encanto (2008)

Track list

1. Simple
2. Para El Día Después
3. Irreversible
4. Clavel del Aire
5. Desencanto
6. Cristal
7. Shangrilá
8. La Casa Azul
9. Todo Me Golpea
10. Cuando Aquieten tus Heridas
11. Escaparte al Mundo
12. Espuma al Viento
