= Mayeli Villalba =

Afro-Paraguayan photographer

- Citizenship: Paraguay
- Occupation: Photographer
- Website: https://www.mayevillalba.com/

Mayeli Villalba is an Afro-Paraguayan photographer and visual artist, whose explores the history and contemporary experiences of Paraguayans of African descent, including the community of Kamba Cua. Her works have been exhibited at the Bristol Photo Festival, Centre of Photography in Montevideo, and the Museo del Barro.

== Career ==
With a degree in social work, Villalba is a sixth-generation Afro-Paraguayan from Asunción. She is a founding member of the South American photographers' collective Ruda in 2018. Her work explores the history and contemporary experiences of Paraguayans of African descent, including the community of Kamba Cua. She has colloaborated with El País, the United Nations and Amnesty International. Her works have been exhibited at the Bristol Photo Festival, Centre of Photography in Montevideo, at the Centre of the Image in Mexico, and the Museo del Barro selected their work for the Dignity Awards, as well as others.

During the COVID-19 pandemic she undertook a project that was inspired by the environment and agriculture. This project was supported by the National Geographic Society's COVID-19 Emergency Fund for Journalists. She has also been a recipient of a Darryl Chappell Foundation Grant.
