= Afro-Paraguayans =

Paraguayans of African descent

African Paraguayans Afroparaguayos
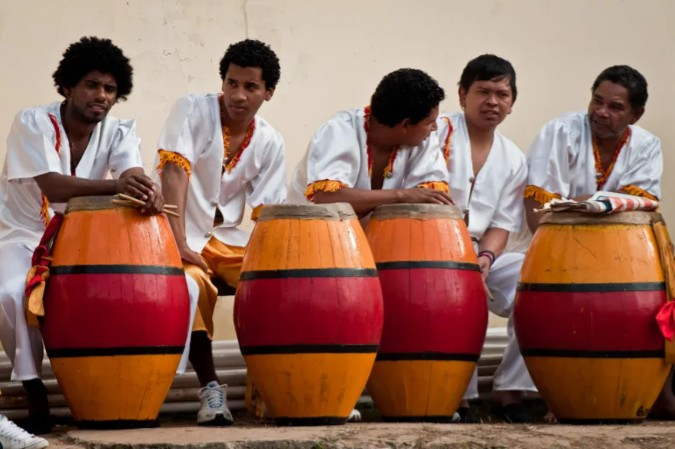
- Drummers from the Kamba Kuá ballet

Total population
- 8,013 (2022 census); 0.13% of the Paraguayan population

Regions with significant populations
- Central Department, Paraguari Department and Cordillera Department

Languages
- Spanish; Guarani

Religion
- Roman Catholicism; Animism

Related ethnic groups
- Afro-Latin American; Ethnic groups of Africa

Afro-Paraguayans are Paraguayans who have predominantly or total Sub-Saharan African ancestry. They can be found in Camba Cua outside Asunción; Kamba Kokue outside Paraguari, and the city of Emboscada.

== History ==
The first African slaves arrived at Paraguay in 1556. The majority of the slaves were of Nigerian and Angolan origin, similar to other black slaves arriving in South American from the slave trade. According to Argentine historian José Ignacio Telesca, the slaves that entered legally came from the slave ports of Buenos Aires, Montevideo and Córdoba, while those that entered illegally came from Brazil. The Spanish explorer Pedro de Mendoza - who reached the Rio de Plata in the 16th century and was appointed its viceroy - brought enslaved Africans to Paraguay. According to the Telesca, more than 4% of the population were slaves in colonial times, keeping the same percentage in the 19th century after independence. However, according to the Kamba Cuá "Afro-Paraguayan Association", in 1782, the black population represented 11.2 percent of the total population of the then Province of Paraguay.

This population continued to increase according to Telesca, and by 1811 half of the Paraguayan population was of African descent, whether slave or free. So, several towns like Aregua, Emboscada (in English: "Ambush"), and Guarambare were established as black communities.

With the arrival of Artigas' also arrived, curiously, people of Kamba ethnicity, a Kenyan ethnic group, from Uruguay, who settled in Paraguay in the 1820s. They arrived in a regiment of 250 spearmen, men and women, who accompanied General Jose Gervasio Artigas, the revolutionary leader of the now Uruguay, in his exile in Paraguay. The Kamba Cua were dispossessed of their land by General Higinio Morinigo in the 1940s. Of his 100 hectares, they stayed with 3 hectares.

A Free Womb Law was adopted in Paraguay in 1842. Most of the male slaves born before that were drafted into the army during the Paraguayan War and then killed in it. Slavery was finally abolished for all ages in 1869.

== Demography ==
Although according to official estimates, the Afro-Paraguayan population accounts for 2% of the total population, the Afro Paraguayan Association Kamba Cuá, supported by the Department of Statistics, Surveys and Censuses (Dgeec) and the U.S. and state IAF, estimated the number of Afro-Paraguayan people at only 8,013, equivalent to 0.13 percent of the 6.1 million inhabitants of Paraguay. This census indicates specifically that there are 422 people in Kamba Cua, 385 people in Kamba Kokué, and more than 7,000 people in Emboscada: 2,686 in urban areas and 4,524 in rural areas and 58% of the total population are of African descent. So, of the total of African descent, 5.6 percent live in Kamba Cuá, 4.9 percent in Kamba Kokue and 89.5 percent in Emboscada.

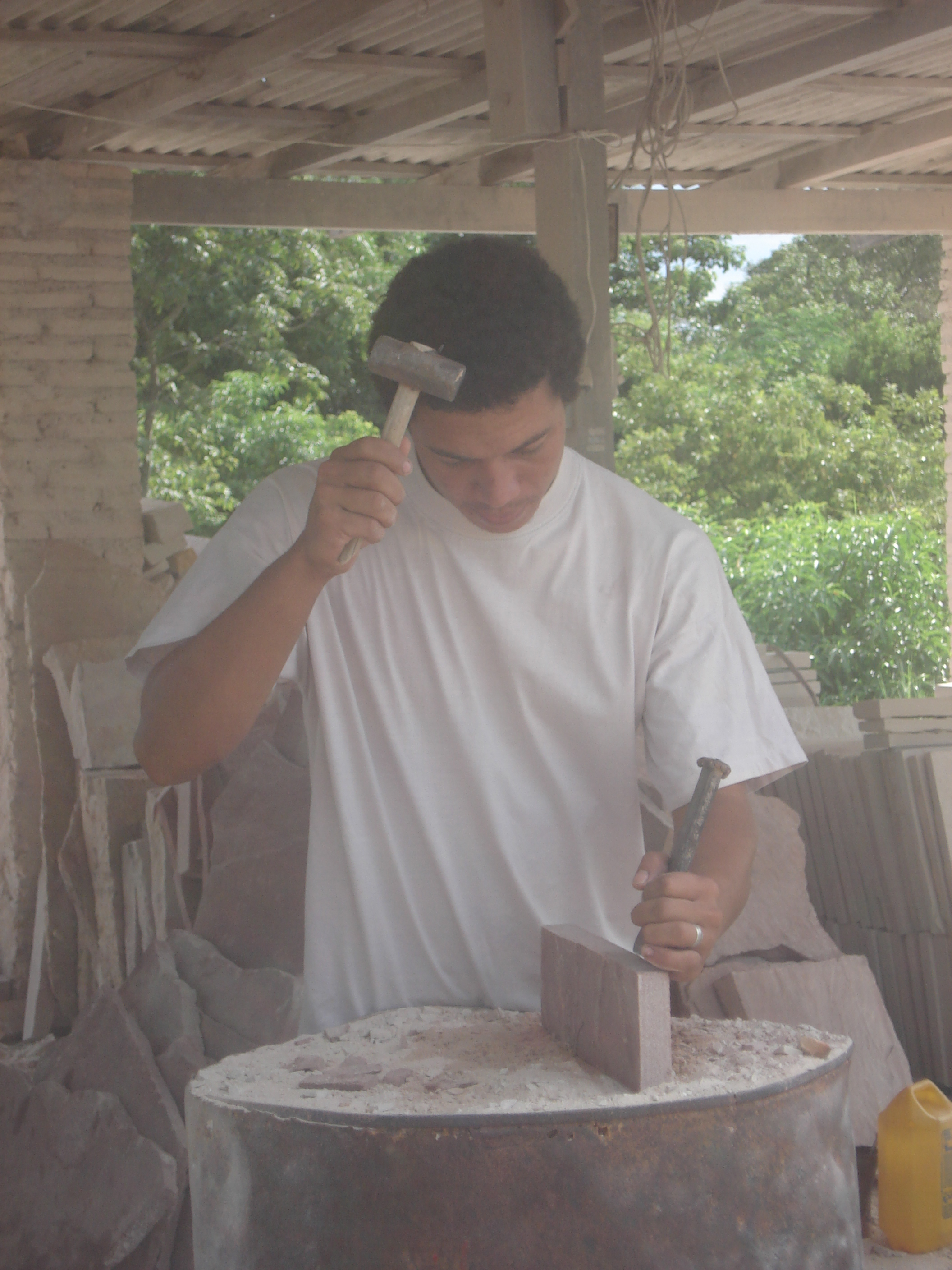
Pardo Paraguayan working in Emboscada (mixed Amerindian, European and Sub-Saharan ancestry)

The census also shows that they are virtually matched for sex and they have a predominantly young population: 63% at that time was under 30 years old. All those of African descent speak Guarani, like the vasty majority of Paraguayans. The illiteracy rate stands at 7.4%, and of that percentage, 58% are women. The number of people who have come to attend the first through to sixth grade accounted for 60% and those who have reached university level only 1%.

Note that the results are unofficial and incomplete since the census did not reach all residents, especially in Emboscada; additionally, some residents surveyed did not self-identify as being of African descent, separate from other groupings of Afro-Paraguayans and individuals of African descent throughout the country that were not included in the census.

As already mentioned, there are three communities of Afro-Paraguayan: the Kamba Cuá, in the Central Department (outside Asunción), Kamba Kokue, meaning "chacra de negros" (farm of blacks) in Guarani language, and is situated in the Paraguarí Department, and Emboscada, in the Cordillera Department. The three communities are in the eastern region. The origins of these settlements date back to the Spanish colonial period.

Kamba Cuá hosts the most important Afro-Paraguayan community. This place, in the Central Department, is populated by so-called Artiga's Cue -or "black of Kamba Cuá"-, who are descended from the Kamba people (a Kenyan ethnic group). They arrived in Paraguay as members of a regiment of 250 spearmen, men and women, who accompanied General Jose Gervasio Artigas, the independence's leading revolutionary of the Eastern Band (the current Uruguay) in his exile in Paraguay in 1820. After having arrived in Asunción, they settled in the Campamento Loma area, practicing dairy and secondary agriculture. However, in the 1940s, they were dispossessed of their land by General Higinio Morinigo. Of his 100 hectares, they stayed with 3 hectares. However, the community survived, maintained their chapel and dances, created a football club ("Jan Six-ro"), and a children's drum and dance school of drum. One unique form of Afro-Paraguayan expression is a traditional ballet, which premiered at the Folk Festival peach "Uruguay Yi sings in" 1992 where it won the "Golden charrúa". Their original lands at Campamento Loma remained vacant, and Kamba Cuá recently occupied them and planted manioc, but by the government decision of Wasmosy (post Stroessner), were accused of being "terrorists" and were beaten and evicted.

Today, according to official estimates, about 300 families (between 1,200 and 2,500 people) live in Kumba Cuá. However, according to censuses of the Afro-Paraguayan Association Kamba Cuá, this community consists of only 422 people. Religion is an integral part of daily life. Currently they are Catholic. His saint is San Benito of Palermo and King San Baltazar, who came from Uruguay. Their main festival is celebrated on 6 January each year at the community's social club named after the patron saint. The important ballet artistic expressions of the Kamba Kua and culinary arts of this community have been maintained for nearly 180 years. Their oral tradition recalls that many of them participated and died in the defensive war against the Triple Alliance (1865–69), which destroyed Paraguay. They keep memories of their history, passed down from generation to generation, hold dances like "candombe", dedicated to San Baltasar, and drumming. So, this community is the best known of African descent in Paraguay for having preserved their identity and culture, promoted through its traditional festivals.

Emboscada (in Spanish: "Ambush"), a city that now has about 14,000 inhabitants, was founded in 1740 under the name of "Emboscada de Pardos Libres "(Free Pardo's ambush), because it was a point of frequent ambushes and because early settlers were 500 brown (black and mestizos) freedmen.

Kamba Kokue, in the Paraguarí Department, was also founded by black communities, from ranches of slaves of the religious missionaries of the Catholic Society of Jesus, better known as the Jesuit order. Also towns or villages as Aregua, Emboscada, and Guarambaré were established as black communities.

== Afro-Paraguayan cuisine ==
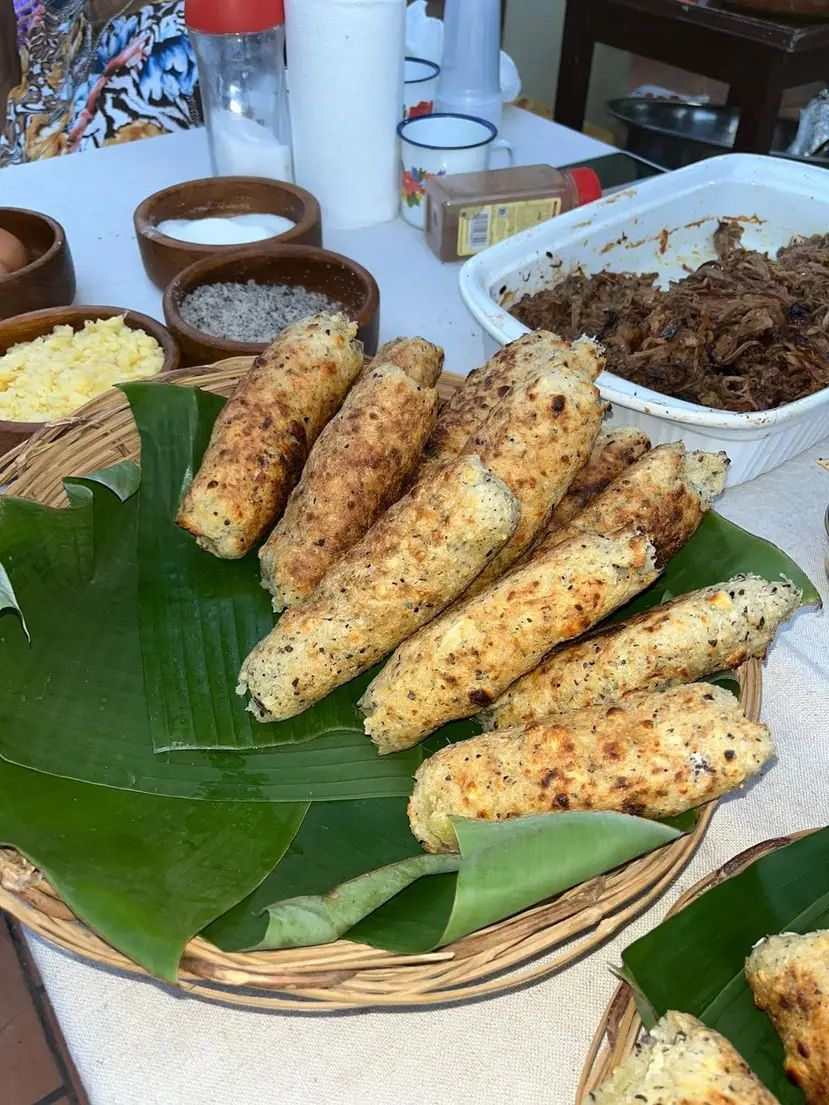
Homemade Afro-Paraguayan Kishima

Kishima is a traditional food of the Kamba Cua community that has survived over time. Made with cooked cassava and grated or ground coconut, it can be sweet or savory and is ideal for breakfast or a snack or to accompany lunch or dinner. In addition to 1 kilo of cooked and very soft cassava, the recipe includes 300 grams of ground Paraguayan coconut, 300 grams of Paraguayan cheese, 2 eggs and salt to taste. A toothpick measuring about 70 cm is needed for grilling over moderate heat.

== Year of African descent ==
The United Nations declared 2011 the International Year of People of African Descent in order to strengthen national policies and international cooperation for the benefit of this group to achieve, in theory, the satisfaction of all their rights, their participation, and integration in all political, economic, social and cultural aspects of society, and promote greater understanding and respect for the diverse heritage and culture of these people.

In this context in Paraguay has been developing the tour of a show called "Negritud de colores" (Negritude Colors) that runs different cities. It is a show of Afro-Latin American music and dance scene that rises to 25 artists to develop a wide repertoire of songs, chants, and dances with rescued African roots of this continent. The Paraguayan singer Mariví Vargas, the team of musicians and a group of drummers and dancers Kamba Cua led by Lazaro Medina offer a show that aims to bring African culture and make visible the collective African descent.

Showing and themes from Argentina, Peru, Colombia, Puerto Rico, Uruguay, Mexico and Cuba and Paraguay, with the presentation of the galloping "San Baltasar" and "Kamba la Merce," a description of the dances related popular culture, plus rhythms Kamba Cua group like-Pitiki Guarimba pitiki and gallops.

== Notable people ==
- Mayeli Villalba, photographer
