= A Contraluz =

A Contraluz may refer to:

- A Contraluz (La Vela Puerca album), 2004
- A Contraluz (Luz Casal album), 1991
