= Asunciónico =

Music festival held in Asunción, Paraguay

- Genre: Mainly rock, pop and EDM
- Dates: Late March
- Locations: Asunción, Paraguay
- Years active: 2015–present
- Website: www.asuncioni.co

Asunciónico is a music festival held in Asunción, Paraguay. The main genres of the festival are rock, pop and EDM, and is held in the month of March.

== Editions ==
The second edition was going to be held in 2016, artists included Florence and the Machine, Jack Ü, Mumford & Sons and Noel Gallagher's High Flying Birds, among others, but it was finally cancelled even though tickets were already sold. The fourth edition was going to be held on March 31 and April 7, 2020, but was finally postponed to the second half of 2020 due to coronavirus pandemic.

The fifth edition scheduled on March 22 and 23 was canceled due to a thunderstorm that made catastrophic consequences on the scenario Espacio Idesa and adjacent areas in Asunción. Miley Cyrus's airplane was struck by lightning and has to land 270 km (168 mi) away from Asunción's airport. Artists like Machine Gun Kelly, LP, among others that were scheduled, perform in places like the hotel they were hosted called (Machine Gun), local pubs of downtown, Asuncion (LP, La Vela Puerca, among others)

Edition	Year	Date	Venue	Main Artists
I	2015	March 19, 20	Jockey Club	Calvin Harris, Jack White, Robert Plant, Skrillex, The Smashing Pumpkins, The Kooks, Foster the People, Kasabian, Interpol, Major Lazer, Bastille, Alt-J, Fitz and the Tantrums, St. Vincent, Kongos
I̶I̶	2016	March 17 (Canceled due to logistic problems)	Jockey Club	Florence and the Machine, Jack Ü, Mumford & Sons, Noel Gallagher's High Flying Birds, Babasónicos, Marina and The Diamonds
II	2018	March 20, 21, 27	Espacio Idesa	Imagine Dragons, The Killers, Gorillaz, Galantis, Kygo, Babasónicos, Turf, Alan Walker, Dillon Francis, Mon Laferte, Yellow Claw, Metronomy, Sofi Tukker, Milky Chance
III	2019	March 28, April 2	Espacio Idesa	Arctic Monkeys, Lenny Kravitz, Twenty One Pilots, The 1975, Steve Aoki, Snow Patrol, Interpol, Jorge Drexler, Damas Gratis, Paulo Londra, Zhu, Cuarteto de nos, Armandinho, Kungs, Loud Luxury, Caramelos de Cianuro
I̶V̶	2020	March 31, April 7 (Canceled due to COVID-19 pandemic)	Jockey Club	The Strokes, Lana Del Rey, Martin Garrix, Fito Páez, Cage the Elephant, The Lumineers, La Vela Puerca, LP, Vintage Culture, Natiruts, Airbag, Ratones Paranoicos, Jota Quest
I̶V̶	2022	March 22, 23 (Canceled due to inclement weather)	Espacio Idesa	Foo Fighters, Miley Cyrus, Doja Cat, Jane's Addiction, Machine Gun Kelly, Justin Quiles, Jhay Cortez, Jota Quest, LP, Nicki Nicole, Él Mató a un Policía Motorizado, Airbag, La Vela Puerca, Los Ángeles de Charly.
IV	2023	March 21, 22	Parque Olímpico	Billie Eilish, Twenty One Pilots, Tame Impala, Rosalía, Lil Nas X, Armin Van Buuren, The 1975, Mora, Diego Torres, Gorgon City, Yungblud, John Simmit, Usted Señálemelo, Bándalos Chinos, Louta, Dillom, Benito Cerati, Hot Milk.
V	2024	March 19, 20, 21	Parque Olímpico	Blink-182, Feid, Arcade Fire, Limp Bizkit, The Offspring, Trueno, Thirty Seconds to Mars, Jungle, Grupo Frontera, Diplo, Alok, Above & Beyond, Timmy Trumpet, Catupecu Machu, The Driver Era, Dayglow, Saiko.
VI	2026	March 17, 18, 19	Jockey Club	Sabrina Carpenter, Deftones, The Killers, Skrillex, Lorde, Doechii, Turnstile, Peggy Gou, Interpol, El Mató a un Policía Motorizado, Addison Rae, Aitana, Viagra Boys, The Warning, Yami Safdie.
