= Buitres Después de la Una =

Buitres
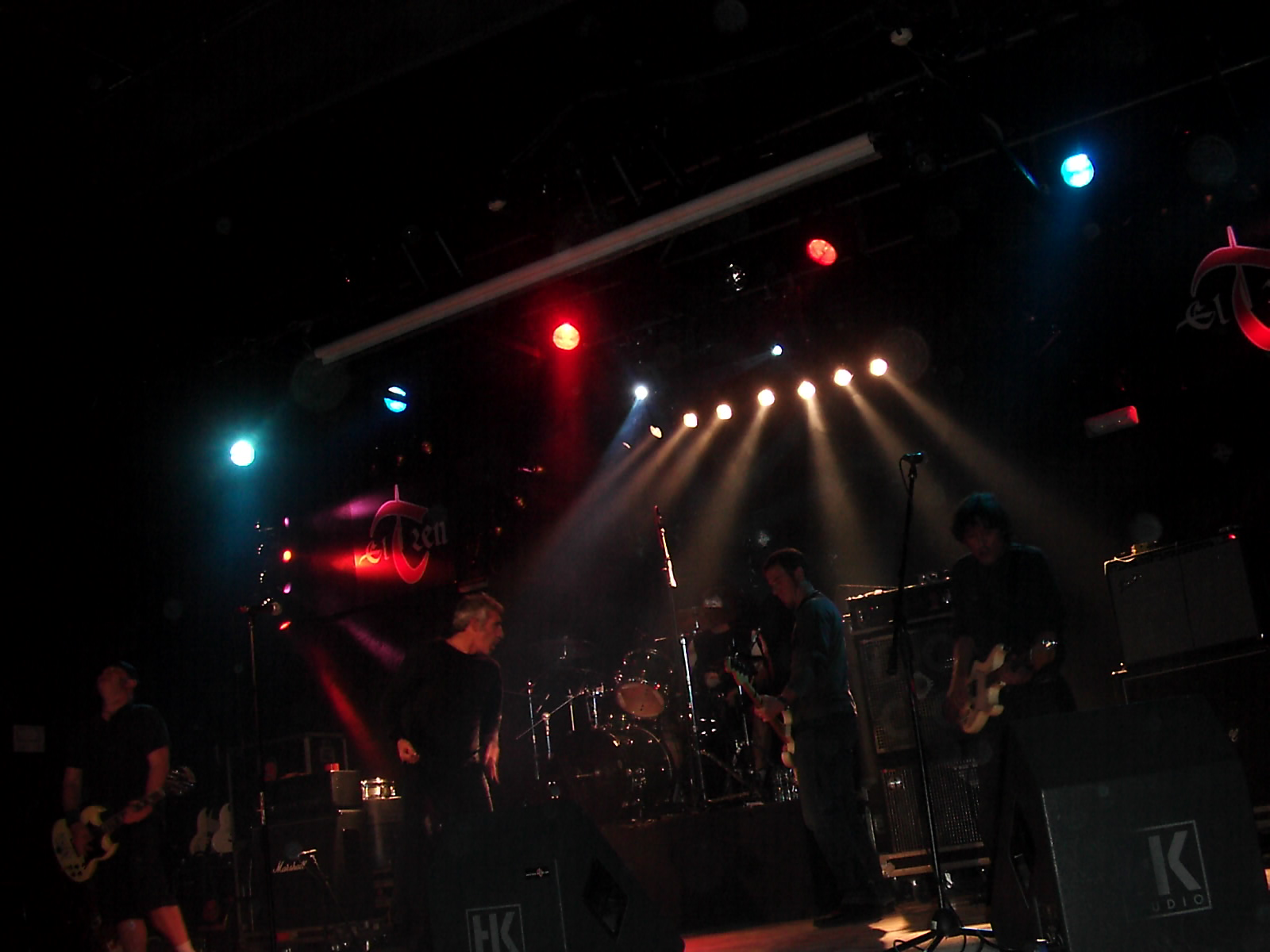
- Buitres – live concert in 2005

Background information
- Origin: Montevideo, Uruguay
- Genres: Rock
- Years active: 1989–present
- Labels: Bizarro, Dakar, Koala, Orfeo, Montevideo Music Group
- Members: Gabriel Peluffo; Gustavo Parodi; Jose Rambao; Orlando Fernandez "Kako" Bianco
- Past members: Irvin Carballo; Marcelo Lasso; Jorge Villar

Buitres Después de la Una is an Uruguayan rock band.

== History of the band ==
=== Beginnings ===
Buitres was formed after Los Estomagos' dissolution, and it originally had three of its members, Gabriel Peluffo as the lead singer, Gustavo Parodi on guitar and Marcelo Lasso on the drums. Jose Rambao joined in as the bass player, he had a short participation as the Los Estomagos' bass player when its original bass player was absent because of health problems.

=== First years ===
In March 1990, they published their eponymous debut under the Orfeo label which was composed of 13 songs, 4 tracks being covers from other bands. And the next year they published another album, called "La Bruja" which had mostly original material, except for a Johnny Thunder's cover.

=== First success ===
In 1993 they released a new album called "Maraviya", as well as a Boxset which included their first two albums. Both of them received high sales and reached the Gold-disc distinction. That same year they performed their first big concert at the Teatro de Verano, in front of more than 5,000 people.

In 1994 they went on their first tour and during 1995 they started playing in Argentina. That same year the videoclips from the songs "Calaveratur" and "Del Cardál" (a Eustaquio Sosa cover) were aired on MTV.

=== Legal issues and success ===
Up to that point their albums were being published by Orfeo which was then acquired in 1996 by EMI. Due to contractual obligations they quickly released an album called "El Amor Te Ha Hecho Idiota" (Love Has Made You An Idiot), which included 9 new versions of previously released songs, plus 3 new tracks.

Because of legal issues caused by the sale of Orfeo, they weren't able to perform any concert through all of 1997. In that period of time the first alignment change was made: the drummer, Marcelo Lasso, left the band and was replaced by Irvin Carvallo.

At the end of 1998, with Jaime Roos as a producer, they released a new album, called "Rantifusa" which was a sales success.

In 1999, they had a three-hour long gig in which they performed 42 songs at the Teatro de Verano in front an audience of 7,000 people. That same recital gave place to two live albums which were released in 2000. The first one was certified gold in less than ten days, and both reached platinum in less than three months.

=== More success ===
In 2000, the drummer left the band and was replaced. In 2001, they edited their new album "Buena suerte... hasta siempre". They also completed their first tour in all Uruguay. In 2003 they released the "Mientras" album and in 2004 the "Periplo" DVD. In 2005 the most significant alignments were made: new drummer and the bass player become the 2nd guitarist, so a new bass player was joined. In 2006 they performed a multitudinary concert in "Velodromo Municipal de Montevideo" in front of more than 7,000 people. As a result, they released a disc and a DVD. In October 2007 they released a new album called "Cancion de cuna para vidas en jauria". In 2009 they celebrated their 20-year anniversary with a new concert and a radio program called Justicia Infinita, as a tribute, releases 20 covers done by important artist in the national ambit: La Vela Puerca, Jorge Nasser, Carmen Pi, Buenos Muchachos, La Teja Pride, Once Tiros, Trotsky Vengarán, Chala Madre, Vendetta, Vieja Historia, El Ultimo De Los Ramones, Socio, La Triple Nelson, Hereford, No Te Va Gustar, Closet y La Saga.

== Discography ==
=== Studio albums ===
- Buitres Después De La Una (Orfeo, 1990)
- La Bruja (Orfeo, 1991)
- La Bruja + Buitres Después de la Una [Double Disc] (Orfeo, 1993)
- Maraviya (Orfeo 1993, reissued by Koala Records in 2004)
- Deliciosas Criaturas Perfumadas (Orfeo 1995)
- El Amor Te Ha Hecho Idiota (1996)
- Rantifusa (Independently released in 1998, reissued by Koala Records 2003)
- Buena Suerte... Hasta Siempre (Bizarro Records, 2001)
- Mientras (Koala Records 2003)
- Periplo – El Asombrante Mundo de los Buitres Después de la Una (reissued by Koala Records in 2004)
- En La Vuelta (2005, released exclusively in Spain)
- Canción de Cuna Para Vidas en Jauría (Montevideo Music Group, 2007)
- 20 Años + 17 Años + Canción de Cuna Para Vidas en Jauría (Montevideo Music Group, 2009)
- Colección Historica (Bizarro Records, 2009)
- Bailemos (Montevideo Music Group, 2010)

=== Live albums ===
- Buitres 10 Años Vol. 1 (Bizarro Records 2000)
- Buitres 10 Años Vol. 2 (Bizarro Records 2001)
- Buitres 17 Años (Montevideo Music Group 2006)

=== DVD ===
- Periplo – El Asombrante Mundo de los Buitres Después de la Una (Koala Records 2005)
- Buitres 17 Años (Montevideo Music Group 2007)
- Tratando de Ordenar el Caos (Montevideo Music Group 2008)
- Coleccion Historica (Bizarro Records 2009)
- Las Canciones son verdad (Montevideo Music group 2012)

=== Books ===
- En Uruguay o en el Infierno (T. Couto-De Leon, 1996)
- El cielo puede esperar (Leo Barizzoni, 2010)
