= Geza Csosz =

Hungarian photographer

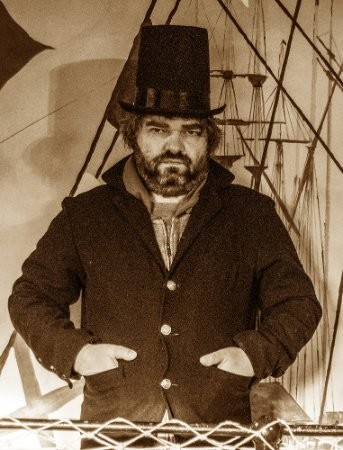
Geza Csosz in Bristol

Geza Csosz is a British-based Hungarian artist and photographer.

== Education ==
Csosz began his photographic studies in Ecole des Beaux-Arts Sion in Switzerland, then completed his studies at UNI Vienna, at the Szellemkép Szabadiskola in Budapest and finally in the UK in Bath Spa University MA Fine Art.

== Life and work ==
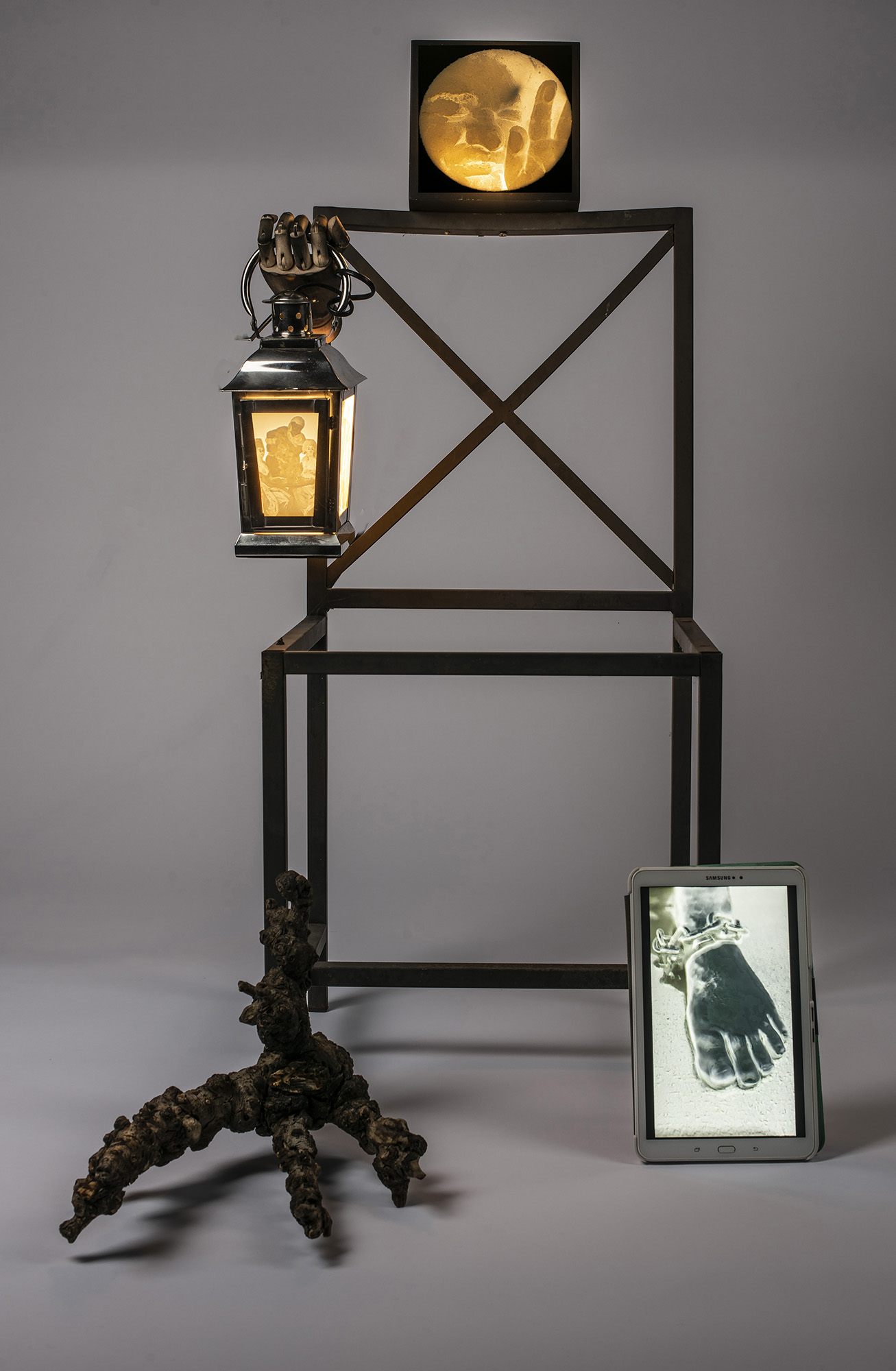
"Modern Slavery"

Csosz's work often features his family as central subjects, with irony and banality.

His works often explore themes like modern slavery, existence, and time, and he has exhibited his art internationally, including in the UK, Spain, Egypt, Hungary, and France. In addition to his photography, Csosz has also produced several films and authored books that reflect his artistic vision and thematic concerns.

One aspect of Csosz's work is his project "Family World," which presents an idyllic and poetic view of life through the lens of his family experiences. This project has a warm, playful, and human-scale world with a sense of childhood wonder and innocence, while also hinting at the underlying complexities and challenges of adult life. (Miltenyi Tibor)

He has worked with enamel. He had exhibitions in Budapest at the Ericsson Gallery of Fine Arts Gallery, and in Szeged (at the Southern Hungarian Creative House).

The central theme of Csosz's artistic practice is the problematic nature of time, existence, and the concept of the present, which he explores through photography, video art, and performative experiments. His research-driven and artistic approach is closely connected to scientific and philosophical discourses; his works analyse perception, continuity, fixity, and the illusion of the moment.

== Publications ==
- Balloon Time Model ISBN 978-615-02-6059-4
- Portishead. Self-published. ISBN 978-1-71-469363-4
- Black on Black. ISBN 978-9--63899364-9
- My Family and the Like. ISBN 978-963-89612-9-7
- PseudoPrivat. Self-published. ISBN 978-1-38-813803-5
- Remove from me lies. Self-published. ISBN 978-0-36-824510-7
- Exhilio. Self-published.
- Halszajoptika
- Danger Soft Mud

== Exhibitions ==
- 2010 Malaga (Spain)
- 2010 Cairo (Egypt)
- 2011 en la Galería Mediadvanced de Gijón (Spain)
- 2011 Budapest, Ethnographic Museum Duna (Hungary)
- 2012 Budapest, Institut français de Budapest (Hungary)
- 2012 Szeged, Premature (Hungary)
- 2012 Paris, Institut français (France)
- 2013 Planete Femmes - EDF Gallery (Hungary)
- 2013 Planete Femmes - Zsolnay Gallery (Hungary)
- 2014 Budapest, Budapest Spring Festival, Bálna (Hungary)
- 2015 Budapest, Bálna (Hungary)
- 2021 Bristol Photo Festival
- 2021 Budapest Photo Festival
- 2024 Bath - The Holburne Museum
- 2024 Bristol Totterdown Canteen
- 2024 Doncaster Open Art Exhibition 2024 Winner
- 2024 Bath Spa University
- 2025 FUSION 2025 Bath
- 2025 The Roper Gallery Bath
- 2025 Ilminster Arts Centre Open Exhibition 2025
- 2025 Digital Ecologies III

== Films ==
- Eszencia (Szilasi László)
- Geza Clockhead's time
- Circle around
- My Time
- Thoughts while looking at an aqua dragon
