= Los Traidores =

Los Traidores (The Traitors) may refer to:

- Los Traidores (band), a Uruguayan rock band
- Los traidores de San Ángel, 1967 action film directed by Leopoldo Torre Nilsson
