= El Impulso =

Studio album by La Vela Puerca
- Released: April 2007
- Recorded: November–December 2006
- Studio: Panda Studios (Buenos Aires); IFU (Montevideo); Casa Blanca Studios (Atlántida)
- Genre: Rock, ska
- Label: Universal Music
- Producer: La Vela Puerca

La Vela Puerca chronology
A Contraluz (2004)	El Impulso (2007)

El Impulso is the fourth studio album by Uruguayan rock/ska band La Vela Puerca. It was released in April, 2007. The album was recorded and mixed by Julio Berta in the period November/December, 2006. The recording took place in three different studios: Panda Studios in Buenos Aires, Argentina, IFU in Montevideo, Uruguay, and Casa Blanca in Atlántida, Uruguay. However, the mixing occurred during February, 2007. El Impulso was mastered in Los Angeles, California, USA by Tom Baker. It was artistically produced by Juan Campodónico. The song "Frágil", was released as a single on Thursday, March 29, 2007. "El Señor", the second single, was released in early 2008, along with its music video.

== Track listing ==
1. Frágil
2. El "Señor"
3. Su Ración
4. Neutro
5. Me Pierdo
6. Clones
7. Colabore
8. Para No Verme Más
9. Con El Destino
10. Sanar
11. Pino
12. La Sin Razón
13. Hoy Tranquilo
