= COVID-19 pandemic in Paraguay =

Ongoing COVID-19 viral pandemic in Paraguay

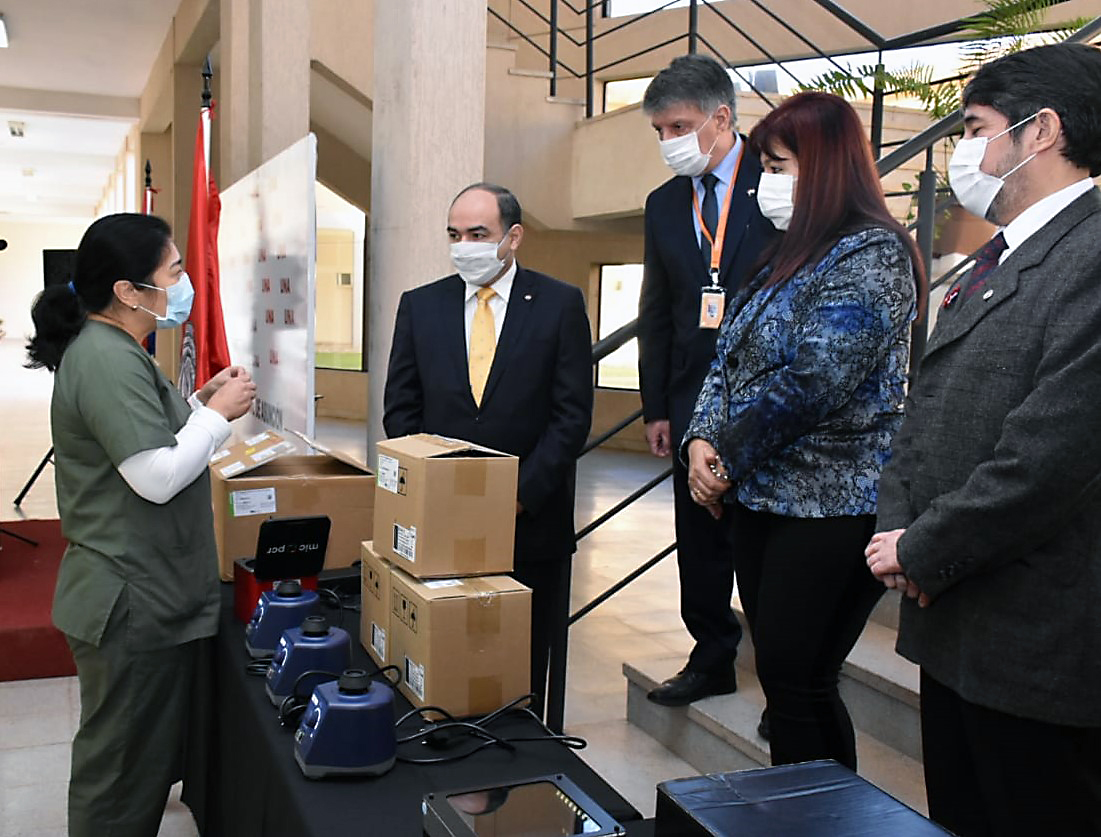
- Equipment for responding to the pandemic, donated to Paraguay by the International Atomic Energy Agency
- Disease: COVID-19
- Pathogen: SARS-CoV-2
- Location: Paraguay
- First outbreak: Wuhan, Hubei, China (global); Guayaquil, Ecuador (local)
- Index case: Central department
- Arrival date: 7 March 2020 (6 years, 7 months and 21 days)
- Confirmed cases: 735,759
- Recovered: 791,239 (updated 27 June 2023)
- Deaths: 19,880
- Fatality rate: 2.7%
- Vaccinations: 3,995,915 (total vaccinated); 3,550,673 (fully vaccinated); 9,954,852 (doses administered)

Government website
- www.mspbs.gov.py/covid-19 (in Spanish)

The COVID-19 pandemic in Paraguay was a part of the ongoing worldwide pandemic of coronavirus disease 2019 (COVID-19) caused by severe acute respiratory syndrome coronavirus 2 (SARS-CoV-2). The virus was confirmed to have reached Paraguay on 7 March 2020, in a 32-year-old man from Guayaquil, Ecuador, living in San Lorenzo, Central Department. Three days later, on 10 March 2020, a second case was confirmed in a 61-year-old man who traveled from Argentina; the same day three more cases were confirmed. Due to this spike, the government began imposing the first measures to stop the disease from spreading.

On 10 March 2020, the Paraguayan government suspended classes and all activities that involved groups of people, as well as public and private events, with the goal of avoiding the spread of the virus, pursuant to Decree no. 3442/2020. Other preventive measures were adopted, such as commerce and movement restrictions, suspension of flights, border closures, curfews, and strengthening controls to ensure compliance with the measures.

On 20 March 2020, the first death and the first case of community transmission were confirmed. The government declared a total quarantine until 3 May, with free movement completely restricted. Public movement was restricted to buying food, medicine and other essential items. At the end of March, the government began to invite Paraguayan expatriates to return to their homeland with opportunities to isolate in supervised shelters, designated and paid for by the government. Returned expatriates were required to quarantine for 14 days. Many expatriates also quarantined in hotels, (called Health Hotels), if they could afford to do so.

After 4 May 2020, Paraguay implemented the so-called "Intelligent/Smart" Quarantine, a gradual return to work and social activities with social distancing and health-focused measures. However, the border remained closed and other inter-country activities remained restricted.

After 5 October 2020, the country moved to a new phase known as the "Covid way of living," relaxing restrictions on most activities while maintaining an increased focus on sanitation until a vaccine or cure was found. National borders were opened and some international flights were resumed. Eventually, specific exceptions could be raised by regional zones or by a particular economic sector, if the circumstances required it. Online learning and nightly curfew were still in effect indefinitely.

COVID-19 is caused by SARS-CoV-2. All regions of Paraguay were affected by COVID-19, leaving no region untouched by the disease. Face masks were required by the government and helped to stop the spread of the virus.

On 18 February 2021, Paraguay received the first doses of the COVID-19 vaccine. There were 4,000 doses of the Sputnik V Vaccine. On 22 February 2021, the vaccine initiative began in Paraguay, focused on vaccinating frontline medical workers who had higher risk of exposure to the disease.

As of February 2022, all restrictions have been lifted by the government, with the only recommendation being to wear a face mask in indoor spaces. In certain cases, proof of vaccination is also required.

== Background ==
On 12 January, the World Health Organization (WHO) confirmed that a novel coronavirus was the cause of a respiratory illness in a cluster of people in Wuhan, Hubei, China, which was reported to the WHO on 31 December 2019.

Unlike SARS of 2003, the case fatality ratio for COVID-19 has been much lower, but the transmission has been significantly greater, with a significant total death toll.

== Timeline ==
Cases

Deaths

=== March 2020 ===
- 7 March: the first case was confirmed in Asunción. The patient was a 32-year-old man who arrived from Guayaquil, Ecuador.
- 10 March: Paraguay suspended public school sessions and large-scale public and private events for 15 days.
- 13 March: Paraguay suspended flights coming from Europe.
- 15 March: Paraguay confirmed partial closures of its borders, restricted crowds and imposed a nighttime curfew.
- 20 March: Paraguay confirmed the first death in the country due to coronavirus, and extended a previously announced quarantine through 12 April, and called for a social isolation policy (total lockdown). Public movement is restricted to buying food, medicine and other essential items.

=== April 2020 ===
- April 8: Nationwide quarantine (total lockdown) extended through 19 April.
- April 17: Nationwide quarantine (total lockdown) extended through 26 April.
- April 20: For the first time in 29 days, no new cases were found.
- April 24: Nationwide quarantine (total lockdown) extended through 3 May. It was decided Paraguay would implement a "Smart/Intelligent Quarantine" phase on 4 May, with a gradual return to work and social activities, with social distancing and hygiene measures in place. However, the government decided to maintain the closure of borders and implement online learning classes until December.

=== May 2020 ===
- May 4: Phase 1 of the "Smart/Intelligent" Quarantine starts.
- May 25: Phase 2 of the "Smart/Intelligent" Quarantine starts.

=== June 2020 ===
- June 9: The Paraguayan government has announced the total closure of the city of San Roque González de Santa Cruz for a period of 15 days, starting on 9 June, with the city returning to a total lockdown phase.
- June 15: Phase 3 of the "Smart/Intelligent" Quarantine starts, with the exception of the Paraguarí and Concepción Departments, which will remain in Phase 2, with the local government controlling circulation at main access points to those Departments for 14 days.
- June 25: Phase 3 (Intelligent Quarantine) extended through 19 July. The city of San Roque González de Santa Cruz returns to Phase 2.
- June 27: Community cases outnumber shelter cases for the first time, already reaching 56% of total confirmed cases.

=== July 2020 ===
- July 13: Paraguarí and Concepción Departments start Phase 3 of the "Smart/Intelligent" Quarantine.
- July 17: Paraguay has surpassed 100,000 tests (PCR)
- July 20: Phase 4 of the "Smart/Intelligent" Quarantine starts, with the exception of Asunción (D.C), Central and Alto Paraná Departments.
- July 29: Due to the increase in cases, the department of Alto Paraná returned to lockdown on 29 July for two weeks, with some authorizations of Phase 1 and commerce allowed between 5:00 am and 5:00 pm.

=== August 2020 ===
- August 8: Phase 3 (Intelligent Quarantine) extended through 30 August in Asunción and Central department.
- August 14: Lockdown extended through 23 August in Alto Paraná department.
- August 15: Phase 4 (Intelligent Quarantine) extended through 30 August in the rest of the country.
- August 23: Asunción and Central department enter a Social Quarantine (Phase 3 with more restrictions, especially in the social sphere). Lockdown extended through 6 September in Alto Paraná department, with some relaxations.
- August 30: Phase 4 (Intelligent Quarantine) extended through 6 September in the rest of the country. Boquerón department and the city of Carmelo Peralta (in Alto Paraguay department) come back to Phase 3.

=== September 2020 ===
- September 3: Quarantine extended until 20 September.
- September 20: Quarantine extended until 4 October.

=== October 2020 ===
- October 5: The "new normal" starts.

=== May 2021 ===
Marcelo Ebrard, Mexican Foreign Minister, announced on 12 May that Mexico will donate 400,000 doses of Oxford–AstraZeneca COVID-19 vaccine to Paraguay, Belize, and Bolivia.

=== January 2022 ===
Foreign travelers not residing in Paraguay, aged 18 and over, must present a complete vaccination record as to enter the country.

== Government responses ==
=== First measures ===
On 10 March 2020, the Paraguayan government suspended classes and all activities that involve groups of people, as well as public and private events, with the goal of avoiding the spread of the virus, pursuant to Decree no. 3442/2020.

Other preventive measures have been adopted as time has gone by, such as restrictions on commerce and movement, suspends flights, closure of borders, restricting entry of foreigners, curfews, and strengthening controls to ensure compliance with the measures.

=== National lockdown ===
On 20 March 2020, the first death and the first case of community transmission were confirmed. The government declared a total quarantine (lockdown) until 3 May, with free movement restricted completely. Public movement was restricted to buying food, medicine and other essential items.

The city of San Roque González de Santacruz (department of Paraguarí) returned to lockdown on 9 June through 24 June, due to the uncontrolled increase in the number of contaminations.

=== Easing of restrictions: Intelligent Quarantine ===
Paraguay implemented from 4 May an "Intelligent/Smart" Quarantine, with a gradual return to work and social activities, with social distancing and hygiene measures in 4 phases. However, the government decided to keep international borders closed, online learning, and the nighttime curfew indefinitely.

- Phase 1: consists of the reopening of industries, small businesses with up to 3 people inside, and all delivery services. Outdoor individual physical activity, such as walking, can occur within 500 meters of a person's home. Access to public and private parks for walking/running trails only is permitted but observing the following: From 5:00 am to 10:00 am access for people, age 65 and older. From 10:30 am to 8:00 pm access for people between the ages of 10 and 64. The use of common areas such as playgrounds, exercise machines, courts and benches are not allowed. Vehicle traffic restriction by license plate.
- Phase 2 consists of the reopening of corporate buildings with up to 50% of the workforce present and under a rotation schedule. This includes civil construction, shopping centers and medium-sized businesses, hairdressers (up to 30 minutes per appointment), religious services (such as weddings and baptisms) with no more than ten people present, and moving services. This is to be carried out in compliance with strict health and safety measures, including the washing of hands coming in and out of venues/sites, mandatory physical distancing and the wearing of face masks at all times.
- Phase 3: consists of the limited reopening of restaurants, religious activities in groups of up to 20 persons, higher school (only exams, thesis presentation, practical and laboratory classes; not include classroom classes), indoor gyms by appointment only, outdoor exercise for up to two people, drive-in cinema and other cultural activities with social distancing measures. This also includes individual physical activity in sports clubs and private parks.
- Phase 4: consists of opening the hotel and cultural sector under a strict health protocol. Religious activities in groups of up to 50 persons (a distance of two meters between each person and the registration of participants), in addition to concerts / music festivals, suitable cinemas and other activities in the cultural sector. Social events are allowed up to 20 people and private social gatherings (preferably family) of up to 10 people. As for sports activities, up to 4 people are allowed in any non-contact sport.

In Phase 1 and 2, the ban on all non-essential movement was in place from 9 pm to 5 am. In Phase 3 and 4, the ban on all non-essential movement is in place from 11 pm to 5 am (Sundays to Thursdays) and from 12 am to 5 am (Friday to Saturday).

=== Return of restrictions in some areas ===
Due to the increase in cases, the department of Alto Paraná returned to lockdown on 29 July for three weeks, with some authorizations of Phase 1 and businesses allowed to be open between 5:00 am to 5:00 pm (called Phase 0,5). Lockdown was extended on 24 August through 20 September, with some relaxations. For example, businesses were allowed to be open until 8 pm. Since 21 September, this department entered a Social Quarantine.

On 23 August, Asunción and Central department entered a Social Quarantine (Phase 3 with more restrictions, especially in the social sphere, for example, curfew between 8 pm to 5 am, prohibition of alcohol sales at night, long-distance trips suspended on weekends, individual physical activity restricted, etc.).

On 31 August, Boquerón department and the city of Carmelo Peralta (in Alto Paraguay department) came back to Phase 3.

On 13 September, Caaguazú department and Concepción department entered a Social Quarantine.

=== New normal ===
As announced on 2 October 2020, by the Minister of Health, the phases of Intelligent Quarantine in the country are finalized, to advance to a kind of new normal known as the "covid way of living", due to the plateau reached in the contagions. Eventually, specific exceptions could be raised by zones or by a particular economic sector, if the circumstances require it, as stated by the same.

From 5 October, interdepartmental circulation will be allowed without restrictions, and free circulation every day between 05:00 am and 00:00 am. The operation of hotels, and social and cultural events is allowed, with a restriction of up to 50 people, among others.

Since 15 October, the international border with Brazil was opened. Likewise, since 21 October, commercial flights were resumed with the reopening of airports. Passengers who came to the country for over 7 days must comply with a mandatory quarantine.

At the end of October, there was a decline in confirmed COVID-19 cases, from more than 5,000 weekly cases during the peak (plateau) to below 3,000 weekly cases. However, after a month of continuous decline, towards the end of November and the beginning of December, cases increased again, reaching the average number of cases once more during the peak between September and October, for which the National Government once again applied some restrictions. As stated by the Director of the Health Surveillance, the pandemic in Paraguay is still on a "plateau" and it is most likely that it will continue like this for the remainder of 2020 and even early 2021.

=== First vaccines and second wave ===
At the end of February 2021, there is an increase in the contagion curve, after a plateau of several months, exceeding the thousand daily infections on average, as a result of the proliferation of clandestine social events, and the number of tourists who traveled both inside and outside the country, especially Brazil.

This excessive increase in infections caused a new saturation in the public health system, to the point that emergency surgeries had to be suspended and doctors must choose who is more likely to live to occupy an ICU bed. In this scenario, beds, supplies, medicines were scarce, as well as the delay in the acquisition of vaccines for COVID-19, which led to massive protests and riots throughout the country, known as the Paraguayan March 2021, ending in the resignation and removal of several ministers, including the Minister of Health Julio Mazzoleni.

On 18 February 2021, the first doses of COVID-19 vaccines arrived in Paraguay, consisting of 4000 doses of the Sputnik V vaccine. These were supposed to go in theory to healthcare workers. Vaccination began on 22 February 2021, in the main health centers of the country. Paraguay lags far behind in the application of vaccines in comparison to its neighboring countries.

Paraguay later received a donation of 20,000 doses of CoronaVac from Chile, for which it began vaccinations on 10 March.

On 12 November 2021, India sent 400,000 doses of the Covaxin, an Indian WHO approved vaccine.

== Shelters ==
Since end of March 2020, the government has used existing infrastructure of military bases, warehouses, police stations, and indoor sports complexes called "albergues" (shelters) to accommodate large groups of individuals -who returned from abroad (mainly from Brazil and neighboring countries.)

Returnees undergo a mandatory minimum quarantine of 14 days, which can be extended if required. Likewise, they have the alternative of quarantining in certain hotels or lodgings (called Hotel Salud) in the event that they can afford it. From April to much of June, the majority of confirmed cases came from shelters, however at the end of the same month the panorama changed, with community (local) cases prevailing over those detected in shelters.

The advisory minister for International Affairs of the Presidency of the Republic, reported that by the end of June more than 8,000 returnees had already passed through shelters (at least 10% of them testing positive for coronavirus). According to the Inter-institutional Coordination Center (CCI), by then, about 70 shelters and 40 'Salud' hotels were located in different parts of the country.

== Impacts ==
=== Economy ===
Paraguay's economy will contract between 2.5% and 5% in 2020 due to the halt in economic activities brought on by social isolation measures to contain the coronavirus. The projection is a stark turnaround from the Central Bank of Paraguay in December 2019 estimate of 4.1% growth in the year. The bank's new estimate also goes further than the International Monetary Fund, which projected in mid-April a contraction of 1.0%.

But the government of President Mario Abdo Benítez has been heavily criticised for failing to support people left without income during the total quarantine. Sixty-five per cent of Paraguay's workers earn their living in the informal economy and have no access to benefits during the coronavirus crisis.

=== Event cancellations ===
As social distancing entered the public lexicon, emergency management leaders encouraged the cancellation of large gatherings to slow the rate of infection, these are a few cancelled or postponed events:

Event	Original Date	Venue	Status	Ref.
Chayanne concert	14 March 2020	SND Arena	Postponed	
Karol G concert	14 March 2020	Jockey Club	Postponed	
Soda Stereo concert	18 March 2020	Jockey Club	Postponed	
Asunciónico	31 March – 7 April 2020	Jockey Club	Postponed	
Kiss concert	7 May 2020	Jockey Club	Postponed	

=== Culture ===
During the pandemic photographer Mayeli Villalba undertook a project that was inspired by the environment and agriculture.

== Statistics ==
=== Charts ===
==== Cumulative number of cases, recoveries and deaths ====
Total cases Recoveries Active cases Deaths

View source data.

==== Confirmed new cases per day ====
View source data.

==== Confirmed deaths per day ====
View source data.

==== Total number of hospitalizations ====
View source data.

== See also ==
- COVID-19 pandemic by country
- COVID-19 pandemic in South America
