= Alvacast =

Uruguayan heavy metal band

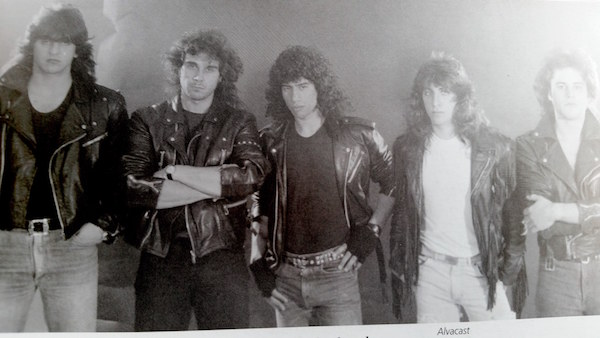
- From left to right: Jorge Villar (drums), Tycho Artigas (guitar), Charly Lopez (voice), Leo Lamela (guitar), Gustavo Rea (bass)

Background information
- Origin: Montevideo, Uruguay
- Genres: Heavy metal
- Years active: 1985–1999, 2014-2015
- Labels: Orfeo; Perro Andaluz; Bizarro Records; Dies Irae
- Members: Charly D. Lopez; Gustavo Rea; Gustavo "Tycho" Artigas; Leonardo Lamela; Jorge Villar
- Past members: Clemente "Bhilo" López; Christian Dehll; Rodrigo Gomez (Sórdromo); Tony Aversa (Macbeth)
- Website: alvacast.com

Alvacast is a heavy metal band formed in Uruguay in 1985 that later relocated to Canada, where it remained active until its dissolution.

== History ==
=== Beginnings in Uruguay ===
The band was formed in 1985 by original members Gustavo Rea (bass), Gustavo "Tycho" Artigas (guitar), Clement "Bhilo" Lopez (guitar), Jorge Villar (drums) and Charly D. Lopez (vocals). The five musicians started playing in Montevideo, as well as the surrounding areas, gradually amassing a following that expressed a keen interest in the band's new musical output.

In 1986, Alvacast recorded their first demo, "Campos de sangre", containing the song "Campos De Sangre ("Fields of Blood"), and performed at the Montevideo Rock Festival with bands from Argentina, Brasil and Chile. The following year the band signed to the Orfeo record label and recorded their first album, Al Borde del Abismo, on vinyl, subsequently performing the full-length recording before a sold-out Odeon Theatre in Montevideo. Alvacast then traveled throughout Uruguay in support of their debut album and consequently secured a prominent position in the country's rock music scene of the time. Later in 1987, Alvacast featured in the Argentinian show, "Rock de Primera" (including Charly García, RIFF, La Torre and others on the bill), held in Buenos Aires, and then played at the Rock Theatre in November with Kamikaze (Argentina).

During 1988, the band consolidated its lineup, with Clement "Bhilo" Lopez leaving the group in 1988 and Leonardo Lamela (guitar) joining it. It was also at this time that music industry press from around the world displayed an interest in the band itself, as well as its music, with European magazines running articles on the band's activities. Alvacast toured heavily in 1988, performing at Montevideo Rock II and playing smaller club shows in Buenos Aires throughout the year. Support for the live shows came from Dr. Jekyll, Retrosatan, and Hermética, among others. In December 1988, Alvacast traveled to Chile to perform two shows in the capital, Santiago de Chile: one was at the Estadio Manuel Plaza, where audiences were disappointed by the show's technical aspects; and a second, more spectacular show was held at the Chile Stadium before more than 4,000 people, leading to high levels of subsequent press coverage.

In 1989, Alvacast recorded their second album Inocente... Hasta que se Demuestre lo Contrario, also under Orfeo. The popular reception of the band in Argentina led to the Radio Tripoli label overseeing the Argentinian release of the group's second album, with a subsequent expansion into Chile and Venezuela, where the first album was also locally released. In Argentina, Alvacast played with Rata Blanca, Lethal and Jaf Alakran at the Halley nightclub, and in 1990 became the first Uruguayan group to complete a "sold-out" performance at the Estadio Obras Sanitarias in Buenos Aires.

=== Relocation to Canada ===
Guitarist Lamela immigrated to Canada in 1991, leading Alvacast to break-up. Several of the other band members also moved north to Canada during 1991 and 1992. Lopez arrived in Montreal in the summer of 1992 and only months later joined Canadian heavy metal band Boize as their second vocalist. Lopez remained with Boize from September to December 1992, performing and recording with the band and entertaining a major record label contract with Aquarius Records. Lopez nevertheless left Boize once the last remaining member of Alvacast had moved to Montreal. In December 1992, Alvacast was reformed as a Canadian band. Having already explored English-language recordings, as well as a limited number of releases in the United States, Alvacast began performing in English.

Alvacast debuted at Montreal's Station 10 on Sainte Catherine Street, and proceeded to work through the challenges of their new environment. During this time, a collection of tapes recorded in Montevideo titled Alvacast para Coleccionistas (en: Alvacast For Collectors) was released by Perro Andaluz Records. In 1994, Sondor re-released Alvacast's sophomore full-length, Inocente... Hasta que se Demuestre lo Contrario, with re-recorded English vocals under the title Black Testaments. Alvacast was however unable to succeed in Canada due to its strong Hispanic heritage and Lopez' discernible Spanish accent while signing in English; this was poorly received by Montreal's predominantly francophone population. Alvacast ultimately broke up for the second time at the end of 1994.

=== Reunions ===
In late 1999, Alvacast made a farewell tour of Canada and Uruguay. Their final show was performed on 29 December 1999 in Montevideo, Uruguay, at La Factoría for an audience of 1,000. Alvacast reunited again in late 2014 for a series of concerts throughout 2015. Three of the five members of Alvacast are still living in Montreal, Canada; one lives in Alberta, Canada while one of them returned to Uruguay. On 2026 the band announced a concert in Uruguay, scheduled for November 14 at Live Era venue.

== Discography ==
=== Studio albums ===
- Al borde del abismo (1987)
- Inocente... Hasta que se demuestre lo contrario (1989)
- Black Testaments (1994)

=== Other releases ===
- Campos de Sangre (demo, 1986)
- Para coleccionistas (compilation, 1992)
