= Centro de Fotografía de Montevideo =

Photography museum in Montevideo, Uruguay

- Centro de Fotografía de la Intendencia de Montevideo
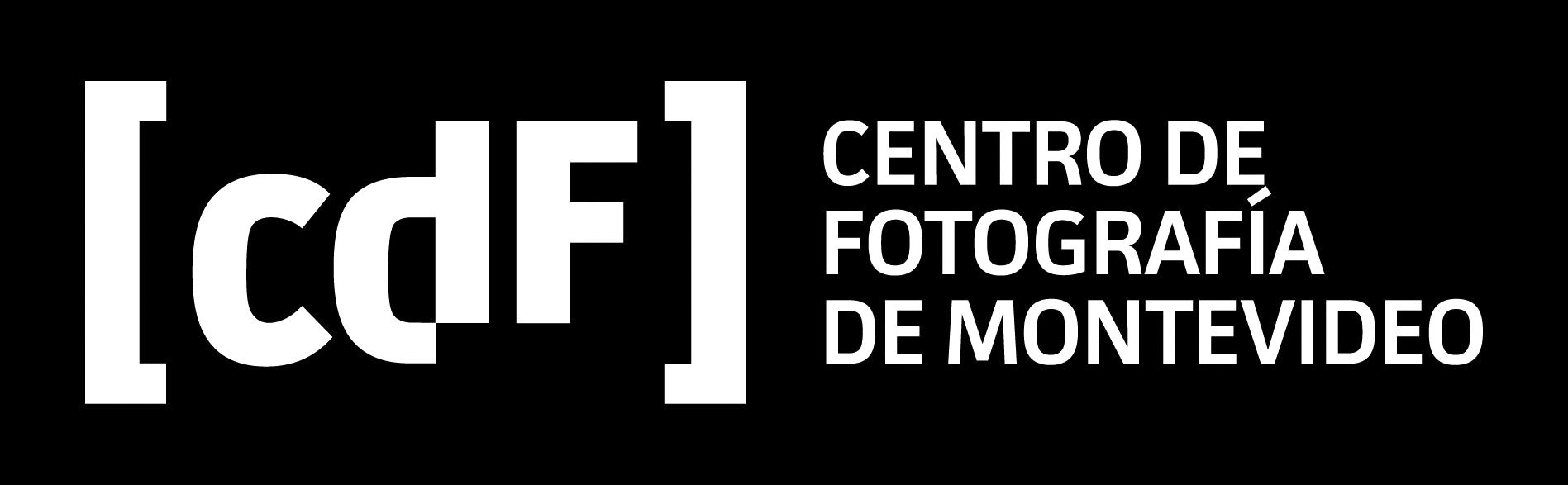
- Established: 2002
- Location: ex-Bazar Mitre, Av. 18 de Julio, 885, Centro, Montevideo Uruguay
- Coordinates: 34.906105306755485°S 56.19705214832337°W
- Director: Daniel Sosa
- Website: CdF official page

The Centro de Fotografía de Montevideo, Uruguay, (CdF) is a South American photography center dedicated to the conservation, documentation, generation, investigation, and dissemination of photographic images of interest to Uruguayans and Latin Americans. It is part of the Information and Communication Division of the City of Montevideo.

== Archive ==
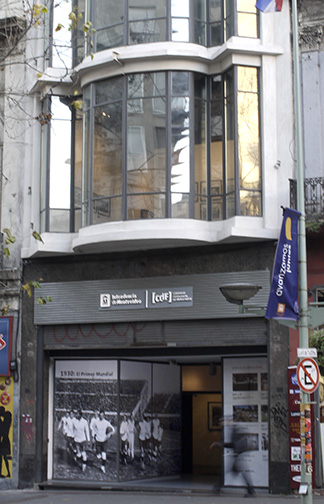
CdF Bazar at 885 Avenida 18 de Julio in Montevideo.

The CdF maintains an archive composed of photographs dating from the 1860s to the present day. Most of the photographs were collected by the Municipal Festival Commission and the Office of Public Relations and Information of the city of Montevideo and document the city's physical evolution and social life. The archive consists of some 120,000 historic and 30,000 more recent photographs, but it is expanding constantly with donations from private individuals and the contributions of CdF photographers documenting contemporary life in Montevideo. It also includes the archive of travesti and LGBT rights activist Gloria Meneses.

== Exhibitions ==
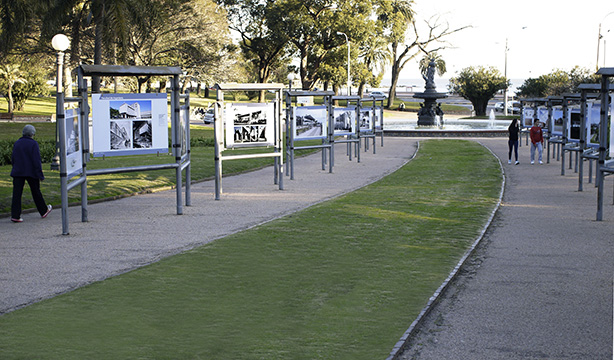
CdF outdoor exhibition in Parque Rodó.

The Centro de Fotografía de Montevideo manages four galleries in its CdF Bazar headquarters, a former department store built in 1931 in the art deco style, and twelve outdoor exhibition spaces in various Montevideo neighborhoods.

The main galleries of the CdF Bazar are dedicated to exhibits about the history of photography in Uruguay and temporary exhibitions on subjects which have included the first FIFA World Cup (held in Montevideo in 1930), Montevideo's Ciudad Vieja, the Paraguayan War, Montevideo during the Pandemic, and the work of contemporary photographers such as Jorge Carlos Tiscornia, Quique Kierszenbaum, Mario Marotta, Pedro Meyer, Pablo La Rosa, Jorge Vidart, Ana Casas Broda, Maya Goded, Jim Dow, and Gisela Volá, among many others.

The twelve open-air exhibition spaces in the Montevideo neighborhoods of Parque Rodó, Prado, Ciudad Vieja, Goes, Peñarol, Unión, Casavalle, Espacio de Arte Contemporáneo, Plaza Cagancha, Capurro, Santiago Vázquez, and Parque Batlle present changing shows of photographs many of which are chosen each September by a panel of three judges from open submissions. Each exhibition consists of eighty or more weather-resistant digital prints mounted on 1 meter by 1.5 meter aluminum panels attached to welded-steel frames. The exhibitions are in public parks and pedestrian streets and are open every day of the year and also at night as the frames are illuminated. One rationale for the open air exhibitions is that they bring foot traffic to previously unfrequented public areas that might otherwise seem dangerous, especially at night. These exhibitions have included a retrospective of the architecture of Óscar Niemeyer, Views of Paris (André Kertész, Marcel Bovis, Eugène Atget), the 2012 London Olympics by Agence France-Presse, and the work of individual photographers such as Sebastián Szyd, João Marcos Rosa, Nacho Seimanas, Laura D'Andrea, Marcelo Isarrualde, Andrea López, and Mayeli Villalba.

== Education ==
To share its expertise in the conservation and organization of photograph collections, the CDF's Centro de Formación Regional offers workshops in archival methods. For school children, the CDF presents a Fotoviaje, a 50-minute program in which two actors represent photographers from the early 20th century who demonstrate how photography and Uruguay have changed over time. Each year more than 3000 elementary school students attend this program which also tours Uruguayan schools distant from Montevideo. For a broader public, the CDF has produced f/22. Fotografía en profundidad, a series of half-hour television programs on photographic topics, and Fotograma tevé, half-hour television programs reporting on the CdF's Fotograma photography festival.

== Festivals ==
Every two years, from 2007 to 2013, the CdF presented Fotogramma, an international festival of photography. Through exhibitions in Montevideo and in all 19 departments of Uruguay, Fotogramma presented a broad sample of modern and historical photography to Uruguayans and publicized the contributions of Uruguayan photographers to the world.

Fotogramma has been superseded by MUFF (Montevideo Uruguay Festival de Fotografía), a triennial festival whose first exhibitions ran from September 2017 through March 2018. Due to the COVID-19 Pandemic, MUFF 2020-2021 has been primarily conducted online with some forty photographers and scholars from throughout South America.

== Publications ==
CdF Ediciones publishes a broad range of books related to photography. Most are books of photographs, composed of historical images drawn from its archive or monographs of the work of Uruguayan and other South American photographers or catalogs for exhibitions mounted by the CdF. It also publishes scholarly research examining the history and sociology of Uruguay and its neighbors. Important examples are Fotografía en Uruguay: Historia y usos sociales, 1840-1930 and a thorough account of the 1839 voyage of L'Oriental that led to the first photographs taken in South America, El Oriental-Hydrographe y la fotografía: la primera expedición alrededor del mundo.
