= Tótem (band) =

- Origin: Montevideo, Montevideo, Uruguay
- Genres: Latin rock, Jazz rock, Psychedelic rock, Candombe, Beat music
- Years active: 1970–1975

Tótem was an Uruguayan rock band formed in the early 1970s. One of the most important massive phenomena of Uruguayan music and represented the height of the Candombe beat.

== Band members ==
1971

- Rubén Rada (lead voice and percussion)
- Eduardo Useta (guitar)
- Enrique Rey († 1995) (guitar)
- Mario "Chichito" Cabral (percussion)
- Daniel "Lobito" Lagarde (bass)
- Roberto Galletti († 2009) (drums)

1972

- Santiago Ameijenda replace Galletti in drums.

1973

- Eduardo Useta (guitar and voice)
- Enrique Rey (guitar and voice)
- Mario "Chichito" Cabral (percussion)
- Roberto Giordano (bas)
- Santiago Ameijenda (drums)
- Tomás "Chocho" Paolini (saxophone)

== Discography ==
=== Simples ===
- 1971

A-side - Dedos

B-side - Biafra

- 1972

A-side - Mi Pueblo

B-side - Negro

=== Long Plays ===
- 1971 - Totem

A-side

1. - Dedos
2. - Chévere
3. - De Este Cielo Santo
4. - Días De Esos
5. - Todos

B-side

1. - Biafra
2. - El Tábano
3. - Mañana
4. - No Me Molestes
5. - La Lluvia Cae Para Todos Igual
- 1972 - Descarga

A-side

1. - Heloísa
2. - Orejas
3. - Manos
4. - Pacífico
5. - Todo Mal

B-side

1. - Negro
2. - Mi Alcoba
3. - Un Sueño Para Gonzalo (instrumental)
4. - Descarga

1973 - Corrupción

A-side

1. - Nena
2. - Toda América
3. - A Victoria y Federico
4. - Hola Hermano
5. - Congueiro

B-side

1. - Corrupción
2. - El Hombre Feliz
3. - Cáspita

== See also ==
- Rubén Rada
- Uruguayan rock
- Candombe
