= A Contraluz (La Vela Puerca album) =

Studio album by La Vela Puerca
- Released: October 2004
- Recorded: March–April 2004
- Genre: Rock, ska
- Length: 57:07
- Label: Universal Music
- Producer: Gustavo Santaolalla

La Vela Puerca chronology
De Bichos y Flores (2001)	A Contraluz (2004)	El Impulso (2007)

A Contraluz is an album by Uruguayan band La Vela Puerca that was produced by Gustavo Santaolalla. It was released in October 2004, after recording during March and April of that year.

== Track listing ==
1. "Llenos de Magia" – 3:54
2. "Sin Palabras" – 3:24
3. "Dice" – 5:08
4. "De Atar" – 4:06
5. "Va a Escampar" – 4:43
6. "Escobas" – 4:01
7. "Clarobscuro" – 5:10
8. "Zafar" – 4:24
9. "Caldo Precoz" – 3:29
10. "Haciéndose Pasar por Luz" – 3:26
11. "En el Limbo" – 4:44
12. "Un Frasco" – 4:43
13. "Doble Filo" – 3:10
14. "A Lo Verde – 3:13

== Personnel ==
- Javier Casalla – string
- Sergio Dawi – baritone saxophone
- Bebe Ferreira – trombone
- Aníbal Kerpel – associate producer, Hammond organ
- Nicolas Lieutier – Bajo Sexto
- Carlos Antoni Mendez – guitar
- Carlos Morales – guitar
- Alejandro Piccone – trumpet
- Martin Pomares – assistant engineer, guitar
- Alejandro Terán – choir arrangement, string
- Julio Berta – mixing
- Juan Campodónico – production assistant
- Pepe Céspedes – producer
- Demian Chorovicz – engineer
- Jorge "Portugués" Da Silva – engineer
- Javier Mazzarol – assistant engineer
- Alejandro Pensa – drum technician
- Oscar Righi – producer
- Gustavo Santaolalla – producer
- Adrián Sosa – A&R
