= Halley (nightclub) =

Halley was a 1980s Argentine nightclub.

Halley was opened in 1985, and it was initially a common nightclub. As both the manager Roberto Ricci and the DJ Jorge Peso liked heavy metal, they included heavy metal songs. Mario Ian, singer of Alakran, proposed to make a concert in Halley; which was a huge success. There were few music venues for Argentine heavy metal bands at the time, so Ricci and the owner Alberto Corapi thought it would be profitable to turn the nightclub into a music hall.

There was a short-lived attempt to move Halley to the Corrientes and Junín streets. It was closed shortly after the move.
