= Los Traidores (band) =

Uruguayan punk rock band

- Origin: Montevideo, Uruguay
- Genres: Punk; Post Punk; New Wave; Alternative Rock
- Years active: 1983 – present
- Labels: Orfeo; Koala Records; Monitor; A.N. Producciones; Bizarro Records
- Members: Víctor Nattero; Juan Casanova; Pato Dana; Marcelo Oliveira; Andrés Tito Chaparro
- Past members: Daniel Jacques; Andres Arrillaga; Alejandro Bourdillon; Caio Martínez; Daniel Bonilla; Roberto Rodino; Fernando Alfaro(músico uruguayo)
- Website: https://www.facebook.com/TraidoresOficial

Traidores (English for "the traitors") is a Uruguayan punk rock band founded during the post-dictatorship disarray of mid-1980s Uruguay.

== History ==
Traidores was born in 1983 when Víctor Nattero and Juan Casanova (his cousin) got together with Pablo Dana and Alejandro Bourdillon started practicing in their houses. The band was influenced by The Clash, Sex Pistols, and by British punk rock from the late 1970s in general. The group started playing live and grew in popularity, attracting a large following for the local scene in which they were based. Los Traidores headed up the first version of Cabaret Voltaire, a gathering of musicians, sculptors, painters, and other young artists from the alternative art scene in Uruguay. The band was included on a compilation of Uruguayan groups called "Graffiti" (Orfeo, 1985), along with the bands Los Estómagos, Zero, Los Tontos, Neoh 23 and ADN. Two of Los Traidores' songs were included "La Lluvia Cae Sobre Montevideo" (The Rain Falls Over Montevideo) and "Juegos De Poder" (Power Games). An album release show was held in the Teatro de Verano in Christmas of 1985 and even though the show was not heavily promoted, more than 5,000 assisted.

From there Los Traidores continued playing live and recorded their first album, titled “Montevideo Agoniza" (Montevideo in Agony) (Orfeo), 1986). The LP did not reflect the theme of its title, even though the record was considered too "heavy" for a first album for its existentialist themes. The band appeared on television, made a couple of music videos (“La Muerte Elegante” [The Elegant Death] and “Juegos De Poder” [Power Games]) and played several large open-air concerts at the Veléódromo Municipal (with an audience of 4,000 people), Teatro de Verano (with an audience of 6,000 people) and closed the final night of the Montevideo Rock I festival (with an audience of 15,000 people).

In 1987 Los Traidores became a quintet, adding Caio Martínez on keyboards. With this formation they released their second record with a more toned-down style that enabled them to reach a larger audience. The album, titled "En Cualquier Parte Del Mundo" [Anywhere in the World] (Orfeo, 1987), was recorded in Buenos Aires, Argentina.

In February 1988 the band appeared again at the Montevideo Rock Festival and later in the year recorded their third album, the self-titled “Traidores” (Orfeo, 1988), which became known as the "black album". They also released a live compilation from their appearances at the rock festival, including a live version of “Montevideo Agoniza”, one of the songs that had been banned years earlier. After this the band split up.

=== First comeback ===
Three years later on October 25, 1991, the band got together again to play at "La Factoría" for a sold-out audience of 1,000 people. The event was recorded as a live album titled “La Lluvia Ha Huelto A Caer” [The Rain Has Fallen Again]. In this occasion, they performed as a quartet with Nattero on guitar, Casanova on vocals, Marcelo Oliveira on drums, and a new bass guitar player: Daniel Bonilla.

In 1994 the group made a surprise appearance on the television show Control Remoto to announce that they were working on a new studio album called Radio Babilonia. For this record Daniel Jacques played bass and Andrés Arrillaga played drums.

In August 1995 Radio Babilonia was released to the public. It was the band's first album released in CD format and it was a critical and commercial success. From this album they made two music videos: “Radio Babilonia” and a new version of “Flores En Mi Tumba” [Flowers In My Grave], one of the songs from their first album, and one of the most well known of their whole repertoire.

In 1996 Victor Nattero moved to Buenos Aires and the band split up again.

=== Second comeback ===
The group got back together in 1998 to play at the International Rock Festival in Montevideo in front of an audience of 6,000 people. Also playing the festival were the groups Illya Kuryaki, Ratones Paranóicos, Man Ray, Pappo, Attaque 77, El Peyote Asesino and 2 Minutos, among others.

In April they played at the second Rock de acá festival with the bands La Renga and Fernanda Abreu, among others, in the Teatro de Verano.

In June 1998 Pablo Dana rejoined the band to play bass guitar after a ten-year absence. The band had regained its core three members from its first three albums and added Roberto Rodino on drums.

Los Traidores played four sold-out shows in the Teatro El Galpón during July and August 1998 to a total of 2,400 spectators. From these gigs the band put together a live acoustic album called “En la Profunda Noche” [In the Deep Night].

For the rest of 1998 the band played its acoustic show in more intimate venues in Montevideo and other Uruguayan cities. They also played several electric concerts, including one sold-out show in the Teatro de Verano with the band Divididos.

The band subsequently broke up once again.

=== Third comeback ===
In July 2000 Los Traidores announced another comeback with new material. The founders Nattero and Casanova joined up again with Daniel Jacques and added Fernando Alfaro on drums. In October they played the Teatro de Verano, recording the session for their third live album called “Traidores en vivo y en directo” which was independently produced.

In August 2001 the band played another live gig for an audience of 1,000 in the nightclub “Black” with new material for their eighth album titled “Primavera Digital” [Digital Spring]. The album took a long time to produce and recording wasn't completed until the end of 2002. The album was eventually released in 2003 by Koala Records.

== Discography ==
1. Montevideo agoniza (Orfeo, 1986)
2. En cualquier parte del mundo(Orfeo, 1987)
3. Traidores (Orfeo, 1988)
4. La lluvia ha vuelto a caer (Orfeo, 1992)
5. Radio Babilonia (Monitor, 1995)
6. En la profunda noche (Koala Records, 1998)
7. Traidores en vivo y en directo (A. N. Producciones, 2000)
8. Primavera Digital (Koala Records, 2002)

=== Compilations ===
1. Graffiti (Orfeo, 1985)
2. Rock Uruguayo Vol.2 (Orfeo, 1986)
3. Montevideo Rock (Orfeo, 1987)
4. Rock en el Palacio (Orfeo, 1987)
5. En vivo: Montevideo Rock II (Orfeo, 1988)
6. Extrañas visiones (Orfeo, 1996)
