= Platano Macho =

Uruguayan band

Plátano Macho was a hip-hop, rap and funk band in Uruguay. The band formed in the mid 1990s and was produced by Gabriel Casacuberta (Clecter) and Andres Perez Miranda (Androoval). The band consisted of SPD Gonzalez, Choniuk, LSPiano a.k.a. 'Supervielle', A/PM a.k.a. Androoval and Clecter.

Their 1998 album 'The Perro Convention' with the Argentinean label PolyGram included the single, "Pendeja", which was included in the regular programming of radio Rock & Pop, MTV latino channel and also on MTV Lingo compilation, where they included bands like Cyprus Hill, Molotov and Control Machete.

Among its members were LSPiano and Clecter, current participants of the collective Bajofondo Tango Club and Androoval, current music producer Androoval Trio, Family Doctors and DubAlkolikz.

== Discography ==
- The Perro Convention (1998)
