= Loma Pytá =

Coordinates: 25.2499°S 57.5484°W

- Barrio
- Interactive map of Loma Pytá
- Country: Paraguay
- Autonomous Capital District: Gran Asunción
- City: Asunción

Loma Pytã is a barrio in the city of Asunción, capital of the Republic of Paraguay.

The land use is predominantly residential and, to a lesser extent, commercial. Currently, there are several shopping centers, including the "El Portal" shopping center. Several renowned hypermarkets have also opened in this area of Asunción, including several appliance and electronics stores.
