= Teatro de Verano =

Amphitheatre in Montevideo, Uruguay

Teatro de Verano Ramón Collazo
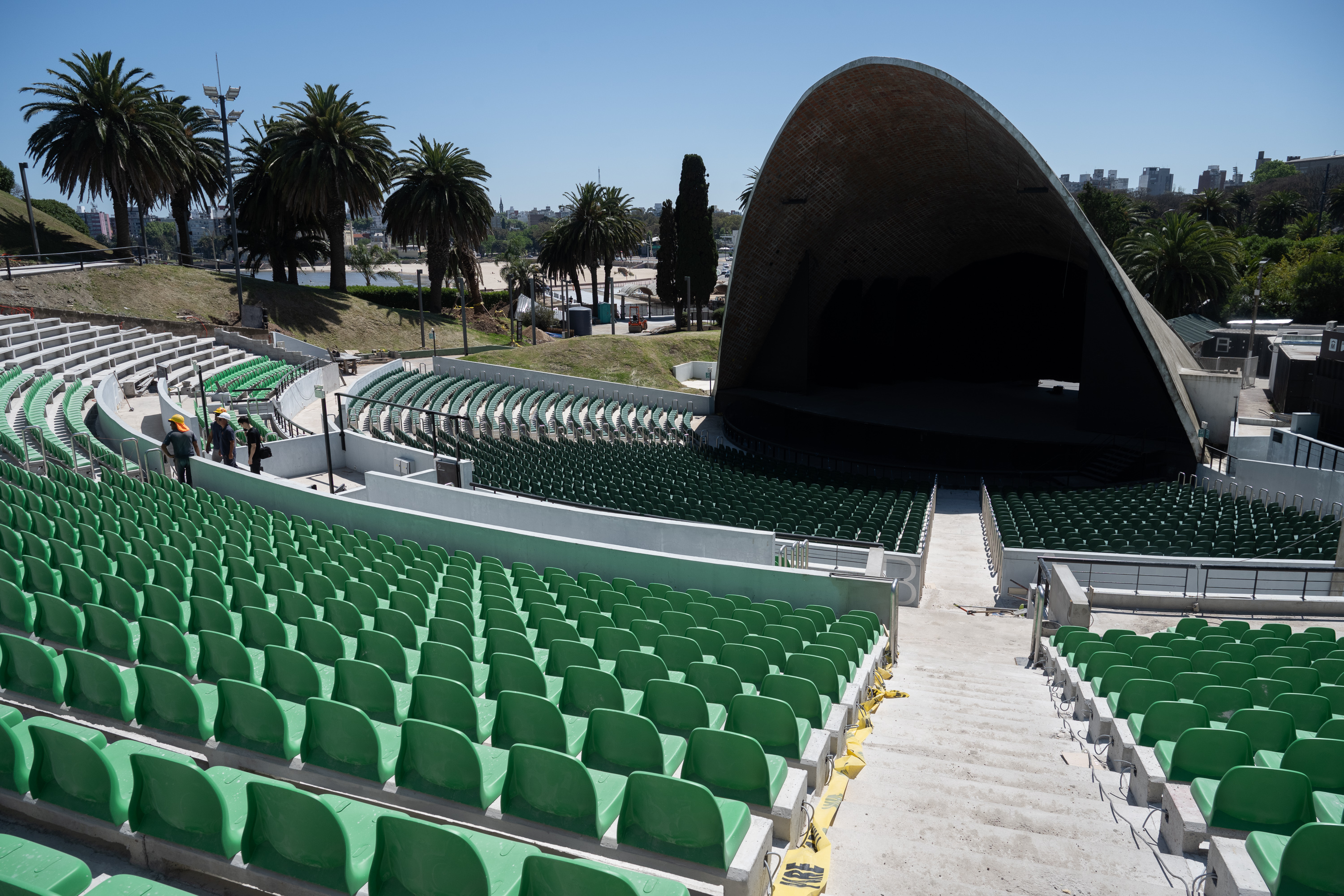
- The amphitheater in 2024
- Interactive map of Teatro de Verano Ramón Collazo
- Address: Rambla Presidente Wilson
- Location: Montevideo, Uruguay.
- Coordinates: 34°55′11″S 56°10′11″W
- Owner: Intendancy of Montevideo
- Capacity: 5,000
- Type: Amphitheater
- Events: Live theater; concerts; cultural events

Construction
- Opened: January 15, 1944; 82 years ago

Website
- teatrodeverano.montevideo.gub.uy

The Teatro de Verano (English: Summer Theatre), officially known as Teatro de Verano Ramón Collazo is an open-air amphitheatre in the Parque Rodó neighbourhood of Montevideo, Uruguay. It was inaugurated in January 1944 and has a seating capacity of approximately 5,000. The venue serves as the principal stage for the artistic and theatrical performances of the Montevideo Carnival.

== History ==
The site currently occupied by the Teatro de Verano Ramón Collazo was originally a quarry property owned in the early 20th-century by businessman Francisco Piria. At the time, the grounds were used for the installation of circus tents hosting various performances and public spectacles.

During the administration of Montevideo Intendant Juan Pedro Fabini (1943–1947), a long-standing proposal to construct an open-air venue in the Parque Rodó quarry area was approved. The project, initially named Teatro Municipal de Verano, was carried out during the second half of 1943. Although the inauguration had been scheduled for 8 January 1944, it was postponed until 15 January due to a severe storm that affected the city that week. The opening performance was presented by the Original Ballet Russe, which travelled to Montevideo for the occasion.

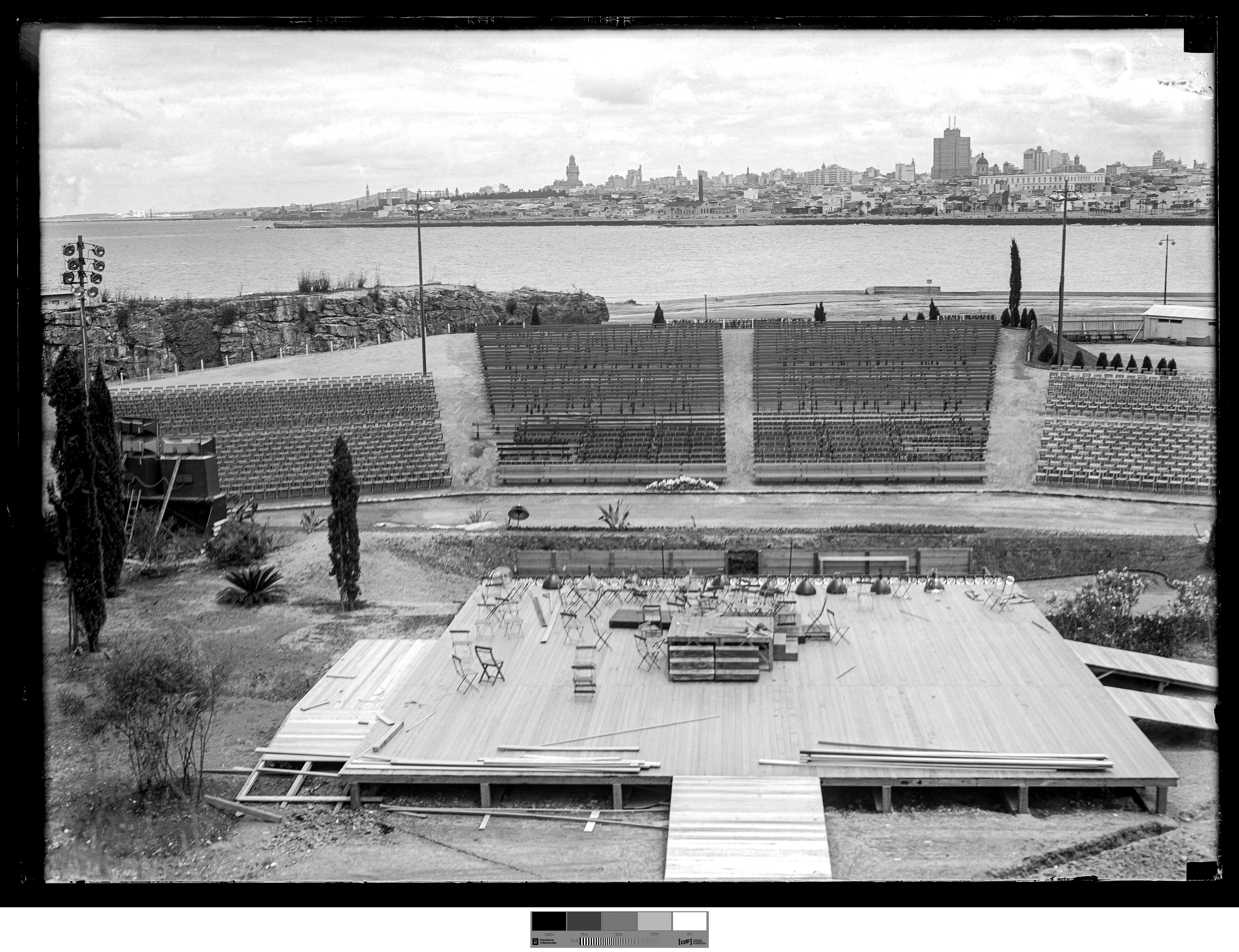
The amphitheatre under construction, 1943

During its early years, the stage was not covered, and wooden seats were installed temporarily prior to each performance. The surrounding trees and vegetation remained integrated into the natural landscape of the venue. In 1945, the theatre hosted its first Carnival event, featuring the winners of the Official Competition of carnival groups, and in 1971 it was designated the official venue of the Montevideo Carnival, hosting all rounds of the competition since then, including performances by murgas, parody troupes, and revue companies.

In 1962, an artistic cone designed by Julio Giacosa for the pavilions of the National Exhibition at the Cilindro Municipal was installed above the stage. It remained in place until 2006, when it was replaced by a ceramic vault designed by architect Carlos Pascual, employing the reinforced brick technique developed by engineer Eladio Dieste. Unlike the earlier structure, the new vault follows a catenary curve rather than a circular form.

In January 1986, the theatre was officially renamed in honour of actor and Carnival performer Ramón Collazo, six years after his death. In the mid-1980s, it also became an important venue for Uruguayan rock music, hosting performances by numerous local bands. Between 2023 and 2024, the theatre underwent renovations, including the refurbishment and addition of seating, upgrades to the lighting system, and the expansion of parking facilities.
