= Bristol Photo Festival =

British photography festival

Bristol Photo Festival is a photography festival in Bristol, England that began in 2021.

== 2021 festival ==
The inaugural festival is taking place from May to December 2021, with a theme of "A Sense of Place". Exhibitions are being held at the Royal Photographic Society, Arnolfini, Bristol City Museum and Art Gallery, and the Martin Parr Foundation, as well as outside throughout the city. The festival's director is Tracy Marshall-Grant.
