= La Vela Puerca =

Uruguayan rock band

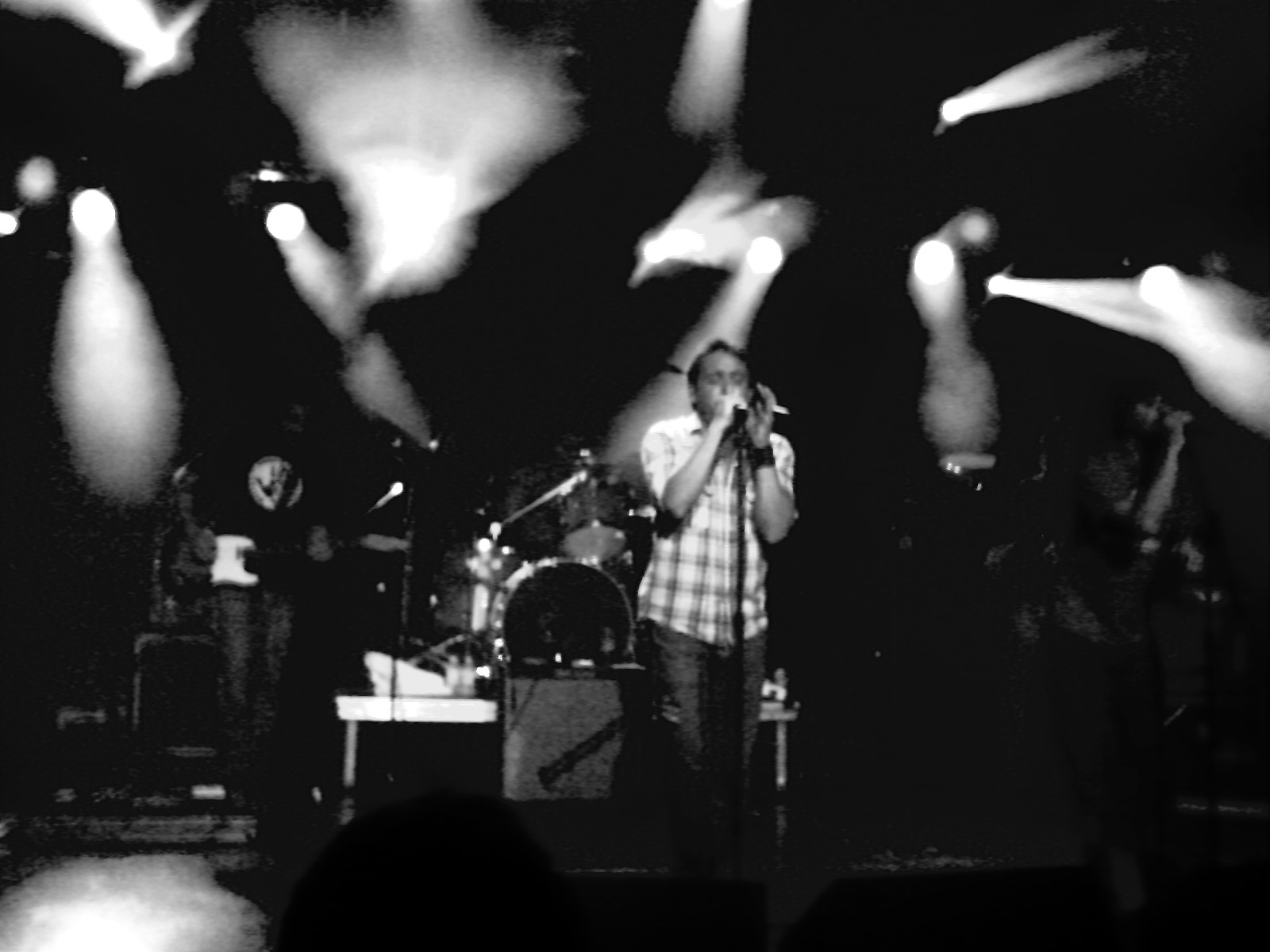

Background information
- Origin: Montevideo, Uruguay
- Genres: Rock, ska, punk
- Years active: 1995–present
- Labels: Universal Music
- Website: www.velapuerca.com

La Vela Puerca is a Uruguayan rock band formed in Montevideo, Uruguay, in December 1995. Its founders and current members are Sebastián Teysera (lead vocals, frontman and main songwriter), Sebastián Cebreiro (vocals, songwriter), Nicolás Lieutier (bass guitar), Rafael Di Bello (guitar), Carlos Quijano (saxo alto) and Santiago Butler (guitar). The band's first appearance under the name La Vela Puerca was at a street party in Montevideo on December 24, 1995. Since then, several new members have joined.

== History ==
=== Beginnings ===
In 1996, frontman Sebastián Teysera entered a demo tape in a band contest. The rest of the band was not aware of this until they found out they were listed among the twenty finalists. It was only a month later that they received a phone call informing them of their success. As a result, they were awarded 80 hours of free recording sessions. These sessions would turn out to be vital for the making of their debut album.

=== Recent history ===
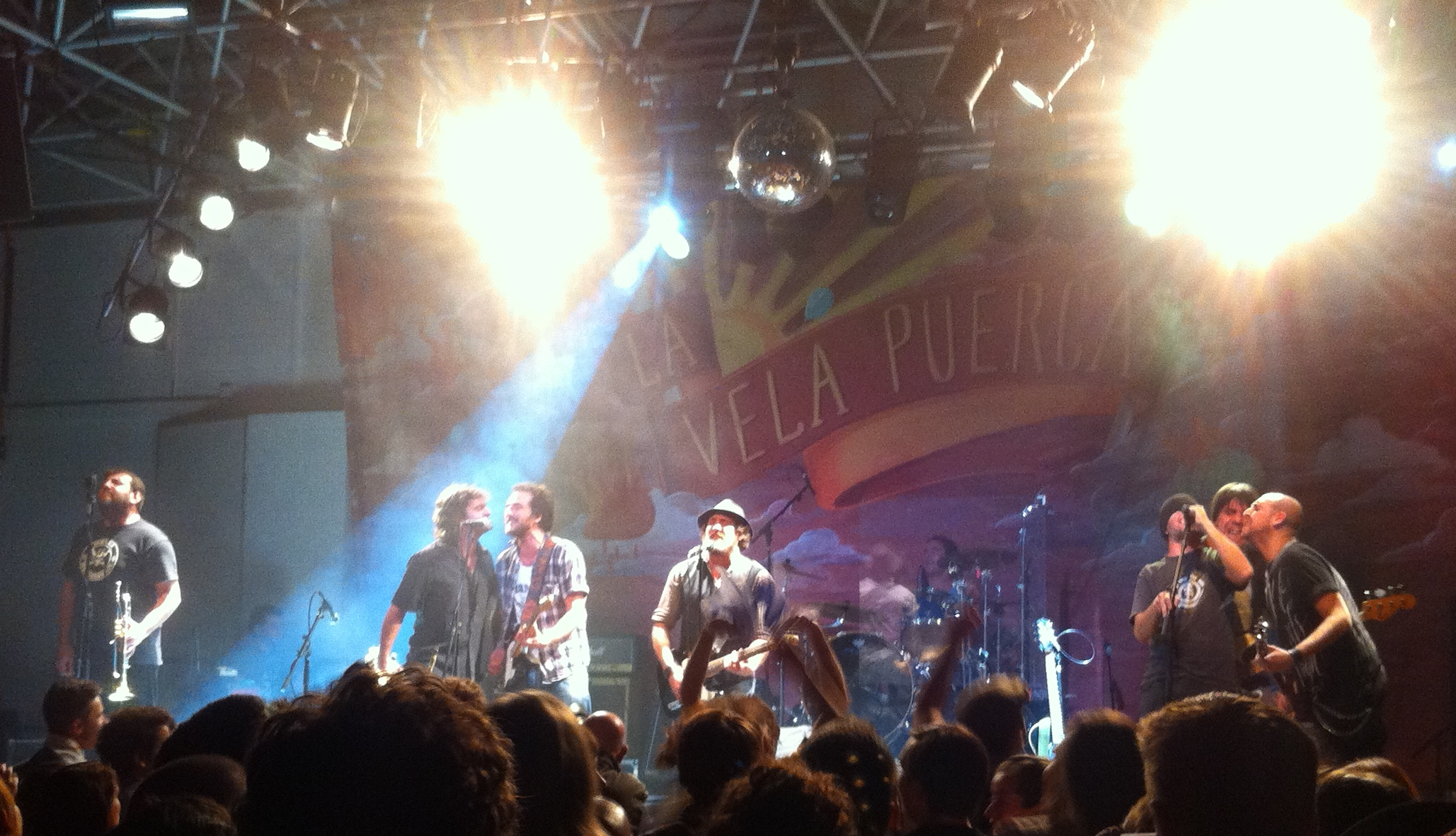
La Vela 2013 in Düsseldorf

To date, the band has released four albums plus a re-release of the first: Deskarado (1997), La Vela Puerca (1999, Deskarado re-release), De Bichos y Flores (2001), A Contraluz (2004), and "El Impulso" (2007). "De Bichos y Flores" and "A Contraluz" were produced by two time Oscar-winning producer, Gustavo Santaolalla.

Their fourth studio album was released under the title El Impulso in April 2007. The album contained 13 tracks and was produced by Juan Campodónico of Bajofondo and Campo.

They have achieved a high level of success in Uruguay and Argentina, and some success in Europe, particularly in Germany.

On November 26, 2005, the band gave a special concert to celebrate their 10th Anniversary. The concert, which was held at the Velodromo in Montevideo, Uruguay, had a giant screen where footage of their European Tour and other various concerts were shown. In 2010 they celebrated their 15th year together.

One of the most recent concerts was in October 2011 at the Uruguayan Bicentennial celebrations(1811–2011), which was a total success.

In October 2011, the band released Piel y Hueso. It was their first and, to date, only double album. One disc contains mostly guitar-driven songs, while the other contains six acoustic songs.

== Discography ==
- Deskarado (1997)
- La Vela Puerca (1999) (Deskarado re-release)
- De Bichos y Flores (2001)
- A Contraluz (2004)
- El Impulso (2007)
- Piel y Hueso (2011)
- Érase (2014)
- Destilar (2018)
- Discopático (2022)

== Band members ==
=== Current ===
- Sebastián Teysera: Lead and backup vocals, occasional harmonica and acoustic guitar
- Sebastián Cebreiro: Backup and lead vocals
- Santiago Butler: Guitar
- Rafael Di Bello: Guitar
- Alejandro Picone: Trumpet
- Carlos Quijano: Alto sax
- José Canedo: Drums
- Nicolás Lieutier: Bass guitar

==== Touring ====
- Diego Méndez: Keyboards

=== Former ===
- Lucas de Azevedo: Drums

== Trivia ==
The band's logo is a drawing of the snout of a pig smoking a marijuana cigarette. Every year, on December 24, the band honors their first appearance as La Vela Puerca with a free show.
