= Los Estómagos =

Uruguayan punk rock band

Los Estómagos was a Uruguayan punk rock band formed in Pando, Uruguay in 1983, is considered one of the most important in the history of Uruguayan rock since they were key figures in the development of the 1980s punk scene along with Los Traidores .

== History ==
Its musical style was based on punk and post-punk from the 1980s, greatly influenced by Spanish rock of the time.

The band was formed in the summer of 1983 in the city of Pando, with three instrumentalists in search of a vocalist. Gabriel Peluffo enters the band in February of the following year, after singing "Rosario" by KK de Luxe in a rehearsal.

They debut on a school dance at the "Centro de Protección de Chóferes" from Pando on 6 August, after 6 months of rehearsals.

2 more months pass until they show up on the "Festival de la Canción" in the city of San José de Mayo, with both an original song (Penicilina) and an interpretation of the classic tango Cambalache. There they win the contest, the prize being the chance to record an album.

Still, in 1983, they make their first TV appearance in Telecataplum, playing "La Barométrica", one of the themes from a single that was never released.

In 1984 they began to prepare for their first LP, Tango Que Me Hiciste Mal, which was produced by Alfonso Carbone. This record heavily borrows from The Cure and Joy Division both in its style and lyrics.

A few months after the release they start to record two songs for Graffiti (a compilation featuring several rock bands of the era): Jugaste Sucio y Cambalache.

Drummer Mariott had previously strayed away from the project, substituted by Leonardo Baroncini, who also played on Los Tontos.

Their popularity peak came in 1986, along with the rock genre as a whole.

This same year they release their second LP, La Ley Es Otra, which included the songs: Penicilina, Hijos Del Imperio and En La Noche, the overall themes were not as dark as in their previous outing, allowing them to get wider recognition.

After recording this album, Baroncini left Los Estómagos and was replaced by Marcelo Lasso, who would stay until the band's dissolution.

In November 1986 they play at Montevideo Rock I.

They travel to Buenos Aires in 1987 to record the eponymous "Los Estómagos", their third LP, for the Argentinian record label Talent, although Orfeo still edits it in Uruguay. This record was controversial since the band returned to their darker and anti-establishment essence with songs like Hielo, Muñeca and No Hay Clemencia, the latter one suffering from censorship.

In February 1988 they perform in front of over 15.000 people at the Montevideo Rock II festival (in the Luis Franzini Stadium); for this show bassist Fabián Hernández was replaced by José Rambao due to health problems. At the end of the same year, they return to Buenos Aires to record at Del Cielito records their last LP: No Habrá Condenado Que Aguante. Which boasted a provocative cover, with images by Rodolfo Fuentes on the front and back, supposedly making an apology for suicide.

It is speculated that the internal fights due to creative control, as well as the scarce repercussion of their last effort, led them to split up, playing for the last time at the Cine Cordón on August 25, 1989.

Gabriel Peluffo and Gustavo Parodi moved on to found the rock group Buitres Después de la Una, while Fabián Hernández went on to form Gallos Humanos, which later changed its name to 4 Golpes.

Despite their relatively short career it remains as a referential cult band.

== Albums ==
=== Studio albums ===
- Tango que me hiciste mal (1985)
- La ley es otra (1986)
- Los Estómagos (1987)
- No habrá condenado que aguante (1988)

=== Compilations ===
- Graffiti (1985)
- Rock Nacional Vol. 2 (1986)
- Montevideo Rock (1987)
- Rock en el Palacio (1987)
- En vivo Montevideo Rock II (1988)
