= No Te Va Gustar discography =

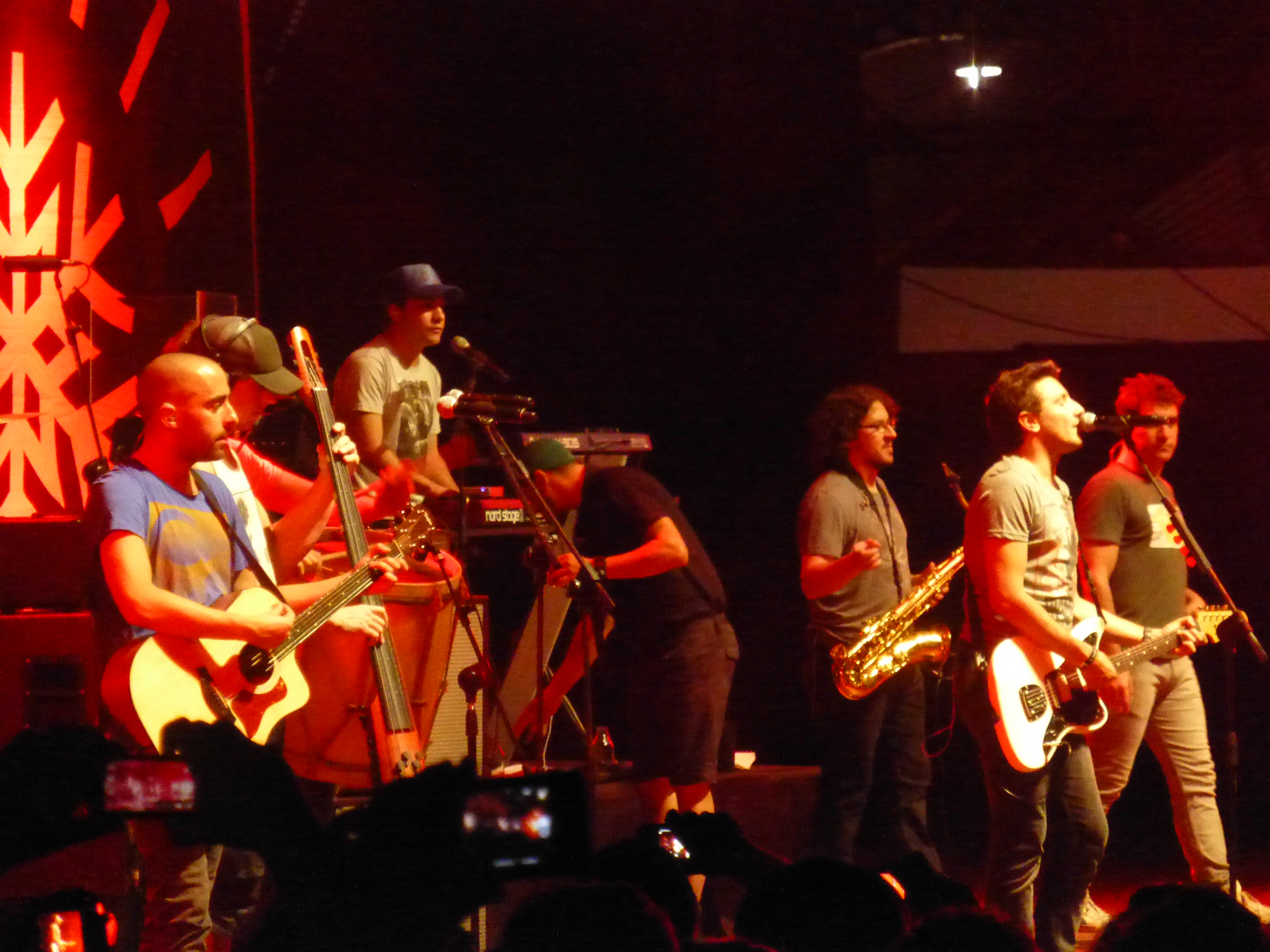
- No Te Va Gustar performing in Oberá in September 2013
- Studio albums: 10
- EPs: 1
- Live albums: 8
- Singles: 26
- Remix albums: 1

Uruguayan rock band No Te Va Gustar has released ten studio albums, one remix album, eight live albums, one extended play, and 26 singles. The band was formed in the Montevideo neighbourhood of Malvín, in 1994 by lead vocalist and guitarist Emiliano Brancciari, bassist Mateo Moreno, and drummer Pablo Abdala. Musicians Pamela Retamoza, Emiliano García, Santiago Svirsky, and Martín Gil joined in the following years. In December 1999, their debut album Solo de Noche was released independently. The band signed with Bizarro Records to release Este Fuerte Viento que Sopla, certified double platinum by the Cámara Uruguaya de Productores de Fonogramas y Videogramas (CUD).

Following the release of three studio albums between 2004 and 2008, the band saw breakthrough success with Por Lo Menos Hoy (2010) and El Calor del Pleno Invierno (2012); both albums received multi-platinum certifications from the CUD and the Argentine Chamber of Phonograms and Videograms Producers (CAPIF), and the latter topped the charts in Uruguay and Argentina. No Te Va Gustar's following albums—El Tiempo Otra Vez Avanza, Suenan las Alarmas, Otras Canciones, and Luz—all reached number one in their native country. The singles "No Te Imaginás" and "Venganza" (with Nicki Nicole) peaked within the top 50 on the Argentina Hot 100 chart published by Billboard Argentina. Their 2012 singles "A Las Nueve" and "Ese Maldito Momento" saw a resurgence on the chart, being the band's highest-peaking songs at number 27 and 43, respectively.

== Albums ==
=== Studio albums ===
List of studio albums, with selected chart positions and certifications
| Title | Album details | Peaks | | Certifications |
| Title | Album details | URU | ARG | Certifications |
|---|---|---|---|---|
| Solo de Noche | Released: December 1999; Label: Self-released; Formats: CD, digital download, streaming | — | — | |
| Este Fuerte Viento que Sopla | Released: 2002; Label: Bizarro Records; Formats: CD, digital download, streaming | — | — | CUD: 2× Platinum |
| Aunque Cueste Ver el Sol | Released: 2004; Label: Bizarro Records; Formats: CD, digital download, streaming | — | — | CUD: 2× Platinum |
| Todo Es Tan Inflamable | Released: 2006; Label: Bizarro Records; Formats: CD, digital download, streaming | — | — | |
| El Camino Más Largo | Released: 23 October 2008; Label: Bizarro Records; Formats: CD, digital download, streaming | — | — | |
| Por Lo Menos Hoy | Released: 1 October 2010; Label: Bizarro Records; Formats: CD, digital download, streaming | 16 | — | CUD: 3× Platinum |
| El Calor del Pleno Invierno | Released: 18 October 2012; Label: Bizarro Records; Formats: CD, digital download, streaming | 1 | 1 | CAPIF: 2× Platinum; CUD: 3× Platinum |
| El Tiempo Otra Vez Avanza | Released: 9 October 2014; Label: Bizarro Records; Formats: CD, digital download, streaming | 1 | — | |
| Suenan las Alarmas | Released: 2 June 2017; Label: Bizarro Records; Formats: CD, LP, digital download, streaming | 1 | 1 | CUD: Gold |
| Luz | Released: 7 May 2021; Label: Elefante Blanco; Formats: CD, digital download, streaming | 1 | — | |
"—" denotes releases that did not chart or were not released in that territory.

=== Remix albums ===
List of remix albums, with selected chart positions and certifications
| Title | Album details | Peaks |
| Title | Album details | URU |
|---|---|---|
| Otras Canciones | Released: 12 April 2019; Label: Elefante Blanco; Formats: CD, LP, digital download, streaming | 1 |

=== Live albums ===
List of live albums, with selected chart positions and certifications
| Title | Album details | Certifications |
|---|---|---|
| MVD 05/03/05 | Released: 10 November 2005; Label: Bizarro Records; Formats: CD, LP, digital download, streaming | CUD: Gold |
| Tan | Released: 17 December 2007; Label: Bizarro Records; Formats: CD, LP, digital download, streaming | |
| Solo de Día | Released: 17 March 2009; Label: Bizarro Records; Formats: CD, LP, digital download, streaming | |
| Público | Released: 9 March 2012; Label: Bizarro Records; Formats: CD, LP, digital download, streaming | |
| NTVG en Vivo: Buenos Aires | Released: 13 January 2014; Label: Bizarro Records; Formats: CD, LP, digital download, streaming | |
| Otras Canciones en Vivo en Latinoamérica | Released: 24 April 2020; Label: Elefante Blanco; Formats: CD, LP, digital download, streaming | |
| Desde Acá Que Cerca Queda el Cielo | Released: 10 October 2024; Label: Elefante Blanco; Formats: CD, LP, digital download, streaming | |

== Extended plays ==
List of extended plays, with selected chart positions and certifications
| Title | Album details |
|---|---|
| Portal Sessions: No Te Va Gustar | Released: 2 August 2024; Label: Elefante Blanco; Formats: digital download, streaming |

== Singles ==
List of singles, showing selected chart positions and associated albums
| Title | Year | Peak chart positions | | | | Album |
| Title | Year | URU | ARG | MEX ESP | PAR | Album |
|---|---|---|---|---|---|---|
| "Cero a la Izquierda" | 2010 | — | — | — | — | Por Lo Menos Hoy |
| "Tu Defecto es El Mío" | 2010 | — | — | — | — | Por Lo Menos Hoy |
| "Chau" | 2010 | — | — | — | — | Por Lo Menos Hoy |
| "Arde" | 2010 | — | — | — | — | Por Lo Menos Hoy |
| "A las Nueve" | 2012 | — | 27 | — | — | El Calor del Pleno Invierno |
| "Ese Maldito Momento" | 2013 | — | 43 | — | — | El Calor del Pleno Invierno |
| "Comodín" (featuring Charly García) | 2014 | — | — | 22 | — | El Tiempo Otra Vez Avanza |
| "Paranoia" | 2015 | — | — | 42 | — | El Tiempo Otra Vez Avanza |
| "Viajando con Espada" | 2015 | — | — | — | — | El Tiempo Otra Vez Avanza |
| "Prendido Fuego" | 2016 | — | — | — | — | Suenan las Alarmas |
| "Para Cuando Me Muera" | 2017 | 10 | — | — | — | Suenan las Alarmas |
| "Autodestructivo" | 2017 | 10 | — | — | — | Suenan las Alarmas |
| "Los Villanos" | 2018 | — | — | — | — | Suenan las Alarmas |
| "Chau" (with Julieta Venegas) | 2019 | 10 | — | — | 35 | Otras Canciones |
| "No Te Imaginás" | 2021 | 2 | 50 | — | — | Luz |
| "Venganza" (with Nicki Nicole) | 2021 | — | 39 | — | — | Luz |
| "Dejo Atrás" | 2021 | — | — | — | — | Luz |
| "La Rama" | 2021 | — | — | — | — | Luz |
| "Josefina" | 2021 | — | — | — | — | Luz |
| "Mi Ausencia" | 2021 | — | — | — | — | Luz |
| "Comida" (with Johnny Hooker) | 2023 | — | — | — | — | Non-album singles |
| "Yo Sabré Qué Hacer" (featuring Vetusta Morla) | 2023 | — | — | — | — | Non-album singles |
| "Algo Me Dice" (with Enjambre) | 2023 | — | — | — | — | Non-album singles |
| "Lo Siento" (with Leiva) | 2023 | — | — | — | — | Non-album singles |
| "OK" (with Leiva) | 2023 | — | — | — | — | Non-album singles |
| "Me Cansé" (with Zoe Gotusso) | 2024 | — | — | — | — | Non-album singles |
"—" denotes releases that did not chart or were not released in that territory.

== Other charted songs ==
List of songs, showing selected chart positions and associated albums
| Title | Year | Peak chart positions | Album |
| Title | Year | URU | Album |
|---|---|---|---|
| "Cielo de un solo color" | 2004 | 15 | Aunque Cueste Ver el Sol |
