= Cielo de un solo color =

Single by No Te Va Gustar

from the album Aunque cueste ver el sol
- Language: Uruguayan Spanish
- Released: 2004
- Studio: Del Cielito Records
- Genre: Uruguayan rock; Uruguayan murga
- Length: 4:06
- Label: Bizarro Records
- Composer: Mateo Moreno
- Lyricists: Emiliano Brancciari; Mateo Moreno; Pablo Abdala
- Producer: Tito Fargo

No Te Va Gustar singles chronology
"Al vacío" (2004)	"Cielo de un solo color" (2004)	"Reevolución" (2004)

"Cielo de un solo color" (English: "Sky of a Single Color") is a song by the Uruguayan rock band No Te Va Gustar, released as the sixth single from their third studio album, Aunque cueste ver el sol (2004). Titled in reference to the blue color of the national flag, it gained popularity among Uruguayan fans during the 2010 FIFA World Cup and since then it became one of the main songs of the Uruguay national football team.

== Writing and themes ==
The song was written by Emiliano Brancciari, Pablo Abdala, and Mateo Moreno—the band’s three founding members—and addresses the country’s difficult situation during the 2002 banking crisis, which led to increased emigration emigration from Uruguay. In an interview with the El País newspaper, Brancciari said that it was a "love song for the country in a difficult time".

The song’s title alludes to the color of the national flag. Its lyrics make reference to the Sun of May and incorporate metaphors associated with Uruguayan national identity. Musically, the composition blends rock with elements of Uruguayan murga.

The song was recorded at the Del Cielito Records studios in Buenos Aires and released at the end of 2004 as the third single from the band's third studio album, Aunque cueste ver el sol. It was officially presented together with the rest of the singles on March 5, 2005, at the Municipal Velodrome of Montevideo.

In 2026, ahead of the 2026 FIFA World Cup, the band released a new version of the song, in collaboration with fellow Uruguayan artists Jorge Drexler and Hugo Fattoruso, as well as the murga group Agarrate Catalina. It was also used as the soundtrack for that year’s tournament squad announcement video.

== Lyrics ==
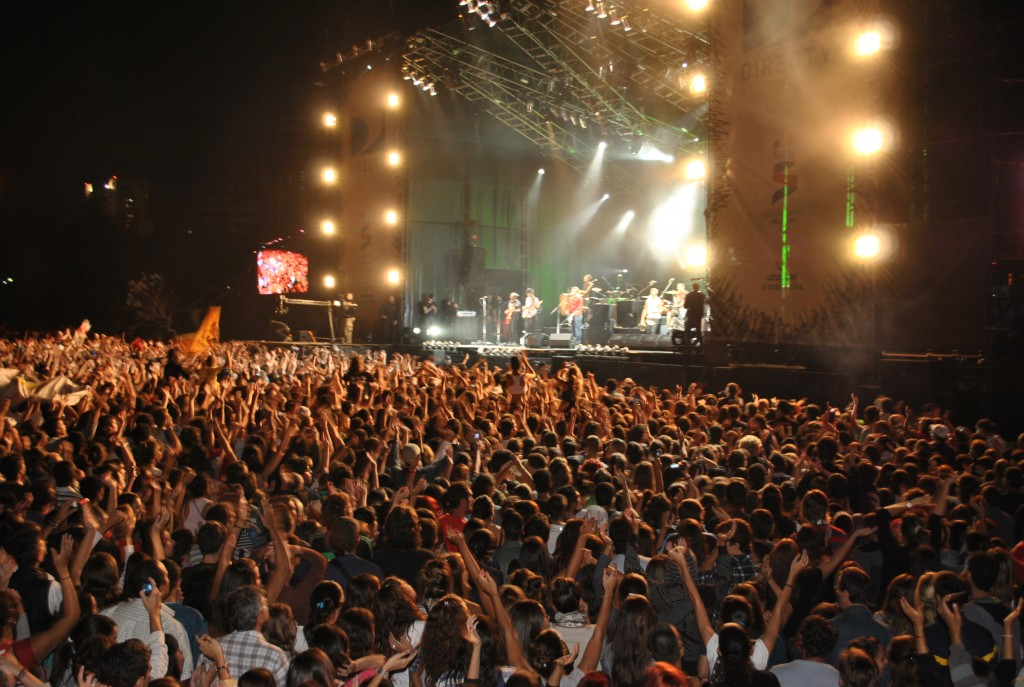
No Te Va Gustar performing in Montevideo, 2011

The song’s inspirational tone reflects the circumstances of crisis in which it was composed, a context that also explains its subsequent association with sporting events. In particular, the chorus—“Hay algo que sigue vivo / Nos renueva la emoción / Y en el último suspiro” (English: "There is something that is still alive / renews our hope / and in the last breath")—has been widely linked to the emotional intensity of football matches, especially in relation to last-minute goals and decisive moments.

The chorus line “Ay Celeste, regalame un sol” (English: "Oh Sky-Blue, gift me a sun") alludes to the Sun of May depicted on the national flag. It has also been associated with the Uruguay national football team, drawing on its widely used nickname, La Celeste (“The Sky Blue”), contributing to its use in such contexts.

== Use at sporting events ==
The song gained popularity during the 2010 FIFA World Cup, when it became widely embraced by fans and was also associated with the national team during the tournament, with supporters singing it in stadiums as a chant. It gradually became an unofficial anthem of the team. Following the tournament, the band performed the song during the official welcome celebrations in Montevideo, further linking it to the team’s success.

In subsequent tournaments, including the 2011 Copa América—which Uruguay won—the song continued to be used as an anthem by both fans and players. During the 2018 FIFA World Cup, it was selected as the team’s official song and was recognized by Billboard as a notable stadium song during the tournament. In the years that followed, it has been played over stadium speakers before matches.

Over the years, its use has extended beyond football, becoming a broader symbol of Uruguay and its athletes across different sports.

== Charts ==
Chart (2018)	Peak position
Uruguay (Monitor Latino)	15
