= No Te Va Gustar =

Uruguayan rock band

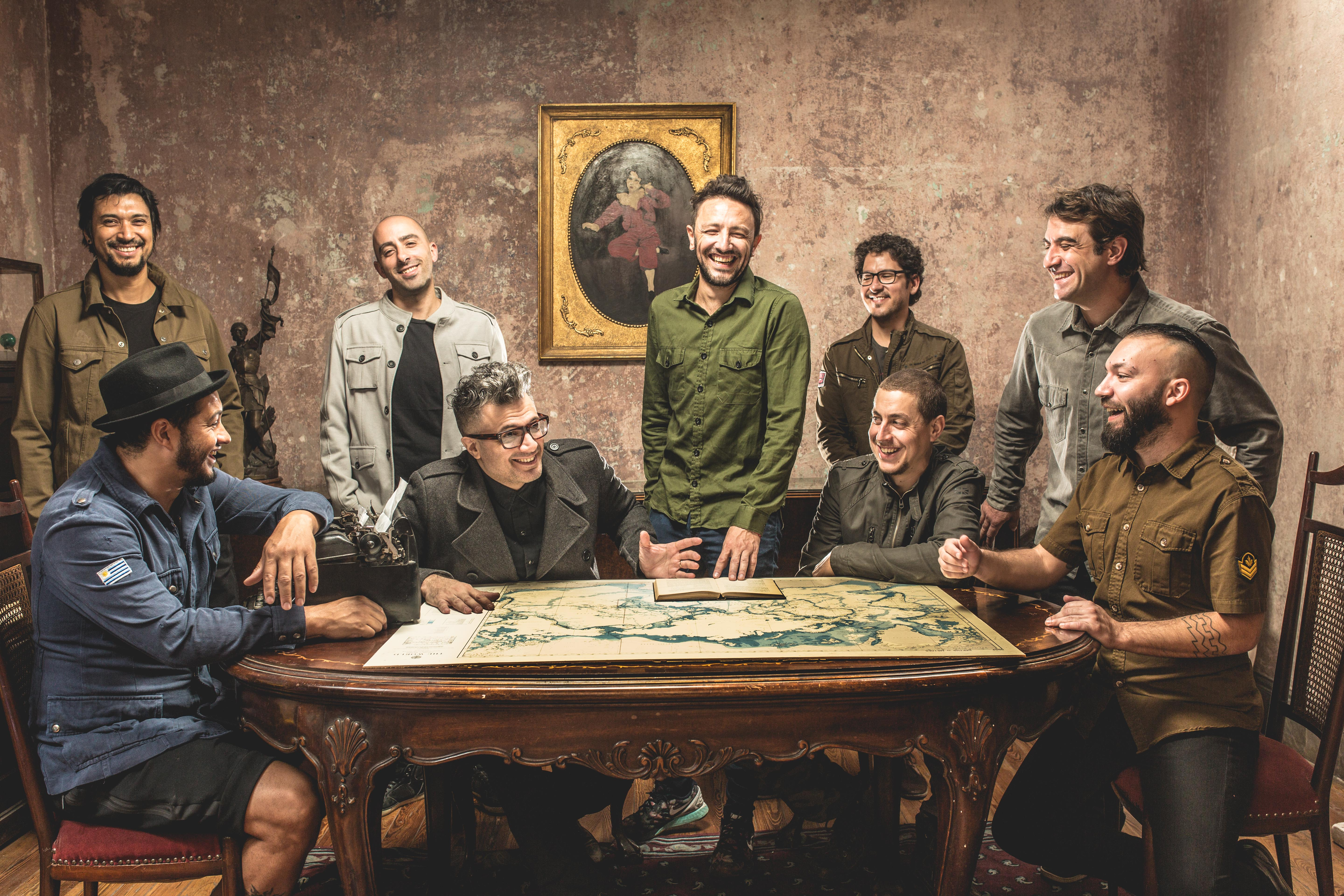
- No Te Va Gustar in 2017

Background information
- Also known as: NTVG
- Origin: Montevideo, Uruguay
- Genres: Rock; pop rock; candombe; ska
- Works: No Te Va Gustar discography
- Years active: 1994–present
- Labels: Bizarro; Elefante Blanco
- Members: Emiliano Brancciari; Guzmán Silveira; Diego Bartaburu; Denis Ramos; Mauricio Ortiz; Martín Gil; Pablo Coniberti; Francisco Nasser
- Past members: Marcel Curuchet †; Pamela Retamoza; Pablo Abdala; Mateo Moreno; Emiliano García; Gonzalo Castex; Santiago Svirsky
- Website: notevagustar.com

No Te Va Gustar, also known by their initials NTVG, is an Uruguayan rock band formed in 1994 in Malvín, Montevideo. The group consists of lead vocalist and guitarist Emiliano Brancciari, bassist Guzmán Silveira, drummer Diego Bartaburu, trumpeter Martín Gil, trombonist Denis Ramos, tenor saxophonist Mauricio Ortiz, guitarist Pablo Coniberti, and keyboardist Francisco Nasser. The group was founded by Brancciari, Mateo Moreno, and Pablo Abdala as a group of friends that played at a small festival. It is considered as the most popular and international Uruguayan rock band and one of the most recognized Latin American groups.

Five years after its founding, No Te Va Gustar independently released their debut studio album Solo de Noche, inspired by the emerging Latin rock. They signed to Bizarro Records to release the album Este Fuerte Viento que Sopla (2002), which solidified their success in Uruguay. During the launch of three albums between 2004 and 2008 and a series of concert tours, they found an internacional commercial breakthrough. The band's sixth record, Por Lo Menos Hoy (2010), was presented in front of 60,000 people in Montevideo. El Calor del Pleno Invierno (2012) marked No Te Va Gustar's first album to reach number one in both Uruguay and Argentina.

No Te Va Gustar's subsequent albums—El Tiempo Otra Vez Avanza (2014) and Suenan las Alarmas (2017)—topped the Cámara Uruguaya de Productores de Fonogramas y Videogramas' chart in their native country. In 2019, the band founded their own record label, Elefante Blanco, to release Otras Canciones, which featured collaborations with various Latin American musicians. Their tenth album, Luz, also peaked at number one in Uruguay.

Throughout their career, though respecting their usual combination of rock and pop, the band experimented with other musical styles, such as murga, candombe, and punk. They have received nominations for ten Latin Grammy, two MTV Europe Music Awards, one MTV MIAW Awards, and one Premios Gardel, while winning an Iris Award.

== History ==
=== 1994–2001: early years ===
No Te Va Gustar was formed in 1994 in the Montevideo neighbourhood of Malvín, when most of their members were around the age of 16. On 26 June, a group of friends who attended Liceo 10 played at a band festival. After initial changes in the formation, the group stabilized as a trio made up of guitarist Emiliano Brancciari, bassist Mateo Moreno and drummer Pablo Abdala. Between 1996 and 1997, with the inclusion of percussion and wind instruments, after the arrival of the musicians Pamela Retamoza, Emiliano García, Santiago Svirsky and Martín Gil, the music of the band began to evolve fusing various Latin American rhythms such as reggae, candombe, ska, salsa, and murga, without neglecting its rock essence. The band started to gain recognition in 1998 when they won the Third Song Festival of Montevideo and another competition organized by the Montevideo City Council Youth Commission.

In July 1999, the band began recording their first album titled Solo De Noche, and its lyrics are critical of several social problems. It was released independently on December and was entirely produced by Juan Campodónico, with the collaboration of Emiliano Brancciari and Mateo Moreno. It also had the participation of Fito Páez in the composition. The album was inspired by the Latin rock that emerged in the 1990s, and its lyrics criticize the Uruguayan government. After the release of the album, Svirsky left the group and was replaced by Denis Ramos. During the summer of 2000 the band toured the east coast of Uruguay. In April 2000, their album was officially presented at the Sala Zitarrosa in the city of Montevideo, with sold out locations. After that show, they continued with a tour throughout 2000 and 2001 throughout Uruguay, while they performed their first shows in Buenos Aires. A year later the number of members was reduced, after the saxophonists (Retamoza and García) decided to leave. They were replaced by Mauricio Ortiz.

=== 2002–2011: international breakthrough ===
During 2002, in Santiago, Chile, the band recorded their second album titled Este Fuerte Viento que Sopla, mixed by Mariano Pavéz. From that moment No Te Va Gustar began solidifying their position as one of the defining groups of Uruguayan rock. The album was certified Gold by the Cámara Uruguaya de Productores de Fonogramas y Videogramas six months after its release.

In 2004, the band toured different countries in South America, and at the end of the year their third studio album titled Aunque Cueste Ver El Sol was released. The record release concert attracted an audience of 10,000 people, and the show was recorded for release on DVD in 2005. The band also did a European tour, playing dates in more than 40 cities including Munich, Hamburg, Bremen, Berlin, Vienna, Bern, and Madrid. That same year No Te Va Gustar celebrated its 10 years as a band in Montevideo. Marcel Curuchet also joined on keyboards.

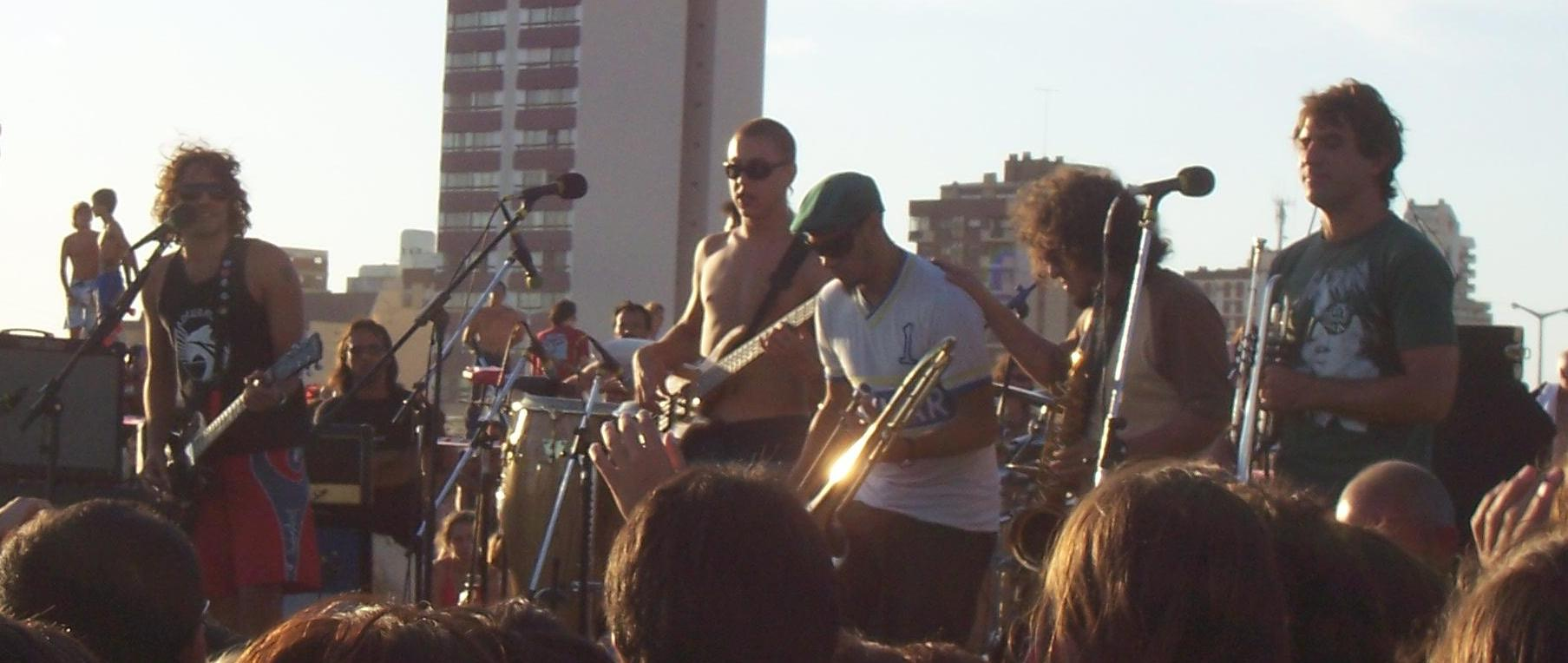
No Te Va Gustar in 2007 playing a concert in Necochea, Argentina

No Te Va Gustar recorded and released their fourth album Todo es tan inflamable in 2006, then promoted the album in various concerts in Uruguay and Argentina. Also in 2006, group members Mateo Moreno (bass) and Pablo Abdala (drums) left the group citing personal reasons. Diego Bartaburu joined as drummer, and the previous one, Abdala, was announced as responsible for the artistic production. Guzmán Silveira joined as bassist.

On 5 April 2008, they performed at the Estadio Monumental in Quilmes Rock, where they shared the stage with Guasones, Los Ratones Paranoicos, Las Pelotas and Los Piojos. On 22 October, they released their fifth studio album called El Camino Más Largo, recorded at Elefante Blanco between May and August of the same year. About the title of the record, the band stated: "it is a concept that encompasses us in many ways, in the way we live and in the way we take our careers". The album is considered by critics to be much happier and with more romantic lyrics, without leaving behind the band's roots and social criticism. In 2009, a concert tour to promote the album visited Buenos Aires at the Estadio Luna Park, Cuba, Costa Rica and European countries.

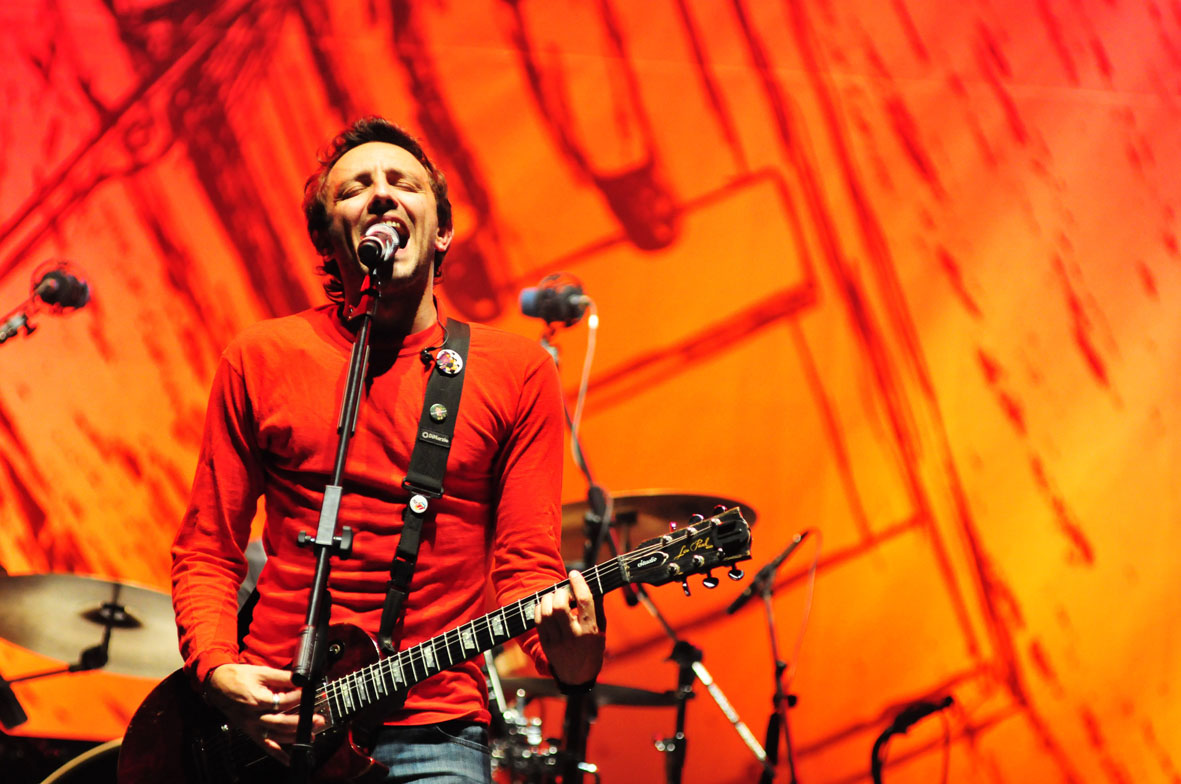
Emiliano Brancciari in Montevideo in 2011

Por Lo Menos Hoy, the band's sixth studio album, preceded by the single "Cero a la Izquierda", was released in 2010. It was presented on 19 March 2011 in Montevideo for 60,000 people, in a free show, and in the following month with four concerts at the Estadio Luna Park. That same month the album reached Gold certification in that country. It was also certified triple Platinum in Uruguay. Produced by Juanchi Baleiron, the album was recorded in June at the Elefante Blanco studio, and released through Bizarro Records, like all their albums except their first. The album contains 12 songs that were mostly written during the band's tours and performances in different cities. The band received their first two nominations at the Latin Grammy Awards at the 12th annual edition, participating in the Best Rock Album category and in the Best Rock Song category with the song "Chau".

=== 2012–2015: El Calor del Pleno Invierno and El Tiempo Otra Vez Avanza ===
Público, their fourth live album and DVD, was released on 9 March 2012. It was recorded at the presentations in March 2011 in the Rambla of Montevideo and in April of the same year at the Estadio Luna Park. It was certified Gold by the Argentine Chamber of Phonograms and Videograms Producers, and was nominated at the 13th Annual Latin Grammy Awards for Best Rock Album.

On 12 July, keyboardist Marcel Curuchet was admitted to the Jersey City Medical Center after a motorcycle accident on the New Jersey Turnpike Extension in Jersey City, New Jersey. Two days later, on 14 July, Curuchet was noted to be in critical condition and died shortly after that announcement.

On 18 September, the band shared a picture with the words "El Calor del Pleno Invierno", hinting that this would be the title of their seventh studio album. The following day, No Te Va Gustar announced and released the song "A las Nueve", which served as the lead single from their album El Calor del Pleno Invierno. Released on 18 October, the record was certified Gold and Platinum by the Argentine Chamber of Phonograms and Videograms Producers and the Cámara Uruguaya de Productores de Fonogramas y Videogramas, respectively, only three days after. In 2013, it was certified double and triple Platinum in those countries. In that year, Francisco Nasser, son of Uruguayan singer-songwriter Jorge Nasser, joined the band as keyboardist. The band earned two Latin Grammy nominations in the categories Best Rock Album and Best Rock Song with "A Las Nueve" and an MTV Europe Music Awards nomination for Best South American Artist. The concert tour, with the same name as the album, began on 16 March 2013 at the Velódromo Municipal in Montevideo, and went throughout different cities from Latin America, including Santiago de Chile, Panama City, Bogotá, Medellín, Arequipa, Cusco, Lima and Quito.

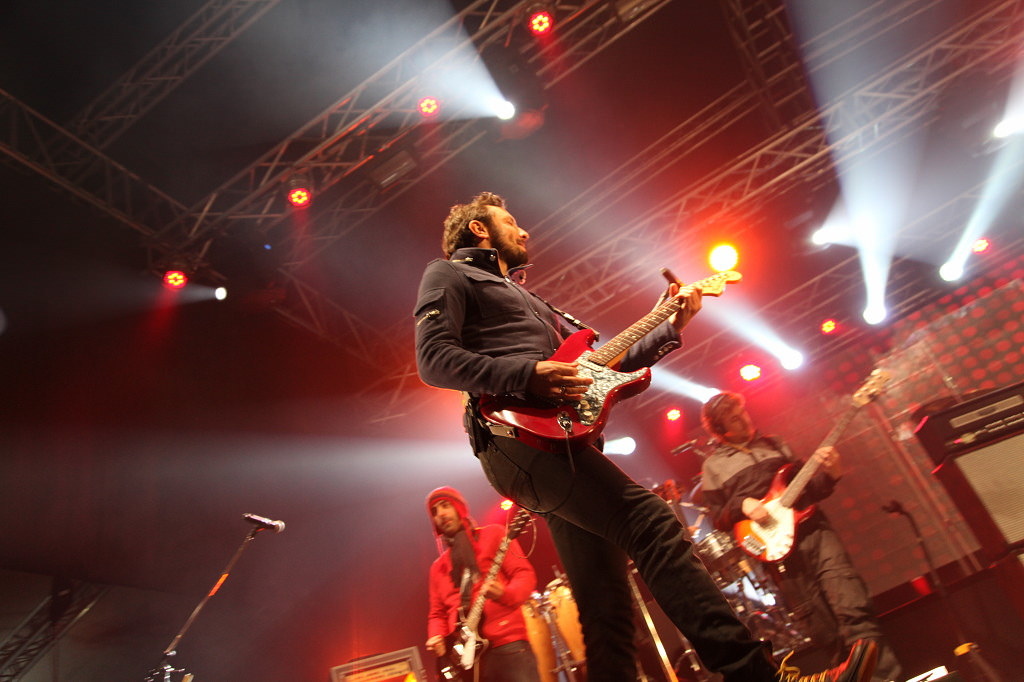
The band performing at the Fiesta Popular in 2014

On 7 September 2014, the band released the song "Comodín", as the lead single from their eighth studio album, along with a music video directed by Gaby Nicoli. It was met with mixed reviews from the general public. The pop rock album El Tiempo Otra Vez Avanza, was released on 9 October 2014, and contains 12 tracks and two bonus tracks on digital editions: "Madre Nuestra" and "Llueve Tranquilo", both which appeared in the band's documental titled El Verano Siguiente (2014). On the record, they experimented with Argentine-inspired folkloric music, funk, murga, reagge and country, and it contains special guests Hugo Fattoruso, Emiliano y el Zurdo, Alfonsina Rossberg, Diego Rossberg and Charly García. Recorded in the studios Elefante Blanco in Montevideo and Romaphonic in Buenos Aires, between June and July of that year, it was produced by Joe Blaney, producer of the Clash. El Tiempo Otra Vez Avanza reached number one in Uruguay, being their second to do so, while "Comodín" and "Paranoia" charted on the Billboard Mexico Espanol Airplay. It received a positive review from Rolling Stone and La Nación, with a score of four out of five stars, and was presented on 11 and 12 April 2015 at the José Amalfitani Stadium, in the Buenos Aires neighborhood of Liniers.

=== 2017–2019: Suenan las Alarmas and remix album ===
After the band traditionally released albums every two years, the distance between their previous album and their ninth was three years. An album produced by Héctor Castillo and inspired by American band the Killers, Suenan las Alarmas was released through Bizarro Records on 2 June 2017, via CD, streaming and LP record. On the record, they move through rock, synth-pop and reggae, and also experimented with folk, country, hip-hop and electronic music. According to Montevideo Portal, in the record, the band "confirms their versatility as creators of indestructible songs, but traveling a muddy path from which they do not come out clean." It was recorded between July 2016 and March 2017, in the studios Elefante Blanco (Montevideo), Romaphonic (Buenos Aires), White Water Music (New York City) and Bass Station (Brooklyn). The band promoted the album with a concert tour throughout Uruguay, Mexico, United States, Argentina and other countries, that culminated on 22 November 2018 at the Estadio de Obras. It also spawned four singles: "Prendido Fuego", "Para Cuando Me Muera", "Los Villanos", and "Autodestructivo".

Following an extensive presentation tour to promote Suenan Las Alarmas, due to the band's 25th anniversary, they recorded Otras Canciones, at the Sala Hugo Balzo in Montevideo between 19 and 20 December 2018. Produced by Héctor Castillo, it is a remix album which features different versions of songs from No Te Va Gustar previous albums in an acoustic format. It was released on 12 April 2019, through Bizarro Records. The record "brings together classic songs that are not played in mass shows, but that are fundamental pieces of their albums, reinterpreted in an intimate way and based on acoustic instrumentation," said the group in a press release. It features guest vocals from Julieta Venegas, Draco Rosa, Jorge Drexler, Flor de Toloache, Catalina García and Hugo Fattoruso. Otras Canciones was preceded by the release of the single "Chau", on 15 February.

=== 2020–present: Luz and collaborations ===
After the departure of founding member percussionist Gonzalo Castex in 2020, No Te Va Gustar confirmed that they were working on their tenth studio album, their first since Suenan las Alarmas in 2017. The single "No Te Imaginás", the first preview from their following album, was announced on 24 December 2020 and released on 8 January 2021, along with its music video directed by Ignacio Benedetti. It reached the top fifty on the Billboard Argentina Hot 100, being their first song to enter the chart. It also peaked at number two on the Uruguayan Monitor Latino airplay chart. The second single, titled "Venganza", which featured Argentine singer Nicki Nicole, was released on 5 March. A feminist track, it was written from the perspective of a victim of gender-based violence. It peaked at number 39 in Argentina. Recorded between October and November 2020 in José Ignacio, Uruguay and mixed and produced by Héctor Castillo, Luz was released on 7 May 2021. The tracks "Dejo Atrás", "La Rama", and "Josefina" were also released as singles.

While Brancciari, the band's leader, focused on his solo project and his album Cada Segundo Dura una Eternidad (2022), No Te Va Gustar went a year without releasing music. Since the following year, the band released several singles featuring international singers. The first in the series of singles was "Comida" in collaboration with Johnny Hooker, a funk cover of the song of the same name by the Brazilian group Titãs. The second song to be released was "Ya Sabré Qué Hace", on April 21, 2023, with the band Vetusta Morla. The music video for the track was their first to be created with artificial intelligence. The following single to be released was "Algo Me Dice", on August 18, featuring the Mexican-American band Enjambre. They also released two songs with Spanish singer Leiva: "Lo Siento" and "OK", on November 2. The last single in the series was a collaboration with Argentinian Zoe Gotusso titled "Me Cansé", released on January 12, 2024. In honor of the band's 30th anniversary, they will tour cities in Spain, Argentina, Colombia, Chile, and other Spanish-speaking countries, as part of their Gira 30 Años.

== Band members ==
Current members

- Emiliano Brancciari – lead vocals, guitar (1994-present)
- Martin Gil – trumpet, background vocals (1997-present)
- Denis Ramos – trombone, background vocals (2000-present)
- Mauricio Ortiz – saxophone (2001-present)
- Diego Bartaburu – drums (2006-present)
- Guzmán Silveira – bass, background vocals (2007-present)
- Pablo Coniberti – guitar, background vocals (2009-present)
- Francisco Nasser – keyboards, guitar, background vocals (2012-present)

Former members

- Gonzalo Castex – percussion (1994-2020)
- Pablo Adbala – drums (1994-2006)
- Mateo Moreno – bass (1994-2007)
- Pamela Retamoza – saxophone (1996-2001)
- Emiliano García – saxophone (1996-2001)
- Santiago Svirsky – trombone (1996-2000)
- Marcel Curuchet † – keyboards (2005-2012)

== Musical style and legacy ==
Considered to be a pop rock band, No Te Va Gustar went through several musical styles throughout their career, such as murga, candombe, punk, reggae and ska. On their debut album, Solo de Noche (1999), they mixed rock and murga. On Este Fuerte Viento que Sopla (2002), they continued experimenting with ska and reggae. On Suenan las Alarmas (2017) the group returned to their characteristic rock sound. On their tenth studio album, they experimented with power pop and hard rock.

No Te Va Gustar is considered the most popular Uruguayan rock band in history, with the greatest international projection, and one of the most recognized bands in Latin America.

== Discography ==
Studio albums

- Solo de Noche (1999)
- Este Fuerte Viento Que Sopla (2002)
- Aunque Cueste Ver el Sol (2004)
- Todo es Tan Inflamable (2006)
- El Camino Más Largo (2008)
- Por Lo Menos Hoy (2010)
- El Calor del Pleno Invierno (2012)
- El Tiempo Otra Vez Avanza (2014)
- Suenan las Alarmas (2017)
- Luz (2021)

== Awards and nominations ==
Award	Year	Recipient(s)	Category	Result	Ref.
Iris Awards	2013	Themselves	Group of the Year	Nominated	
Iris Awards	2013	"A las Nueve"	Song of the Year	Won	
Latin Grammy Awards	2011	Por Lo Menos Hoy	Best Rock Album	Nominated	
Latin Grammy Awards	2011	"Chau"	Best Rock Song	Nominated	
Latin Grammy Awards	2012	Público	Best Rock Album	Nominated	
Latin Grammy Awards	2013	El Calor del Pleno Invierno	Best Rock Album	Nominated	
Latin Grammy Awards	2013	"A las Nueve"	Best Rock Song	Nominated	
Latin Grammy Awards	2015	El Tiempo Otra Vez Avanza	Best Rock Album	Nominated	
Latin Grammy Awards	2017	"Para Cuando Me Muera"	Best Rock Song	Nominated	
Latin Grammy Awards	2018	Suenan las Alarmas	Best Rock Album	Nominated	
Latin Grammy Awards	2021	Luz	Best Rock Album	Nominated	
Latin Grammy Awards	2021	"Venganza"	Best Rock Song	Nominated	
MTV Europe Music Awards	2013	Themselves	Best Latin America South Act	Nominated	
MTV Europe Music Awards	2015	Themselves	Best Latin America South Act	Nominated	
MTV MIAW Awards	2018	"Autodestructivo"	Video of the Year	Nominated	
Premios Gardel	2013	Público	Best Rock Group Album	Nominated	
