= Break It All =

Studio album by Los Shakers
- Released: January 1966
- Genre: Rock, pop
- Length: 29:00
- Label: Audio Fidelity

Los Shakers chronology
Los Shakers (1965)	Break It All (1966)	Shakers for You (1966)

Break It All is the only US-released studio album by Uruguayan rock band Los Shakers. It was released in January 1966 on the Audio Fidelity label.

== "The South American Beatles" ==
Los Shakers were a Uruguay-based band who (after seeing the film A Hard Day's Night) decided to model themselves after The Beatles, right down to their musical style, dress and haircuts. After achieving success in Argentina (as part of a wave of Uruguayan bands to find success there, similar to the Beatles' own "invasion" of America), the group recorded an album for the New York-based label Audio Fidelity, Break It All.

As the label specialized in stereo recordings, Audio Fidelity asked the band (whose name was Anglicized as "The Shakers") to re-record many of their numbers. In the liner notes of their 2000 compilation album, ¡Por Favor!, Osvaldo Fattoruso stated that his brother Hugo (the band's normal lead singer) was a bit hoarse, so Osvaldo sang lead on a number of the tracks instead. Break It All features new versions of songs from their self-titled debut album (which was only released in South America), plus a Spanish version of the Beatles' "Ticket to Ride" (which Audio Fidelity released as a single, with "Break It All" on the flip). There was even talk of bringing Los Shakers "up north", but the group rejected the idea, as they didn't speak English and didn't believe they could be successful in North America. The album itself was considered little more than a curiosity in America and was not a hit, although it later became a collector's item. A CD with bonus tracks was released in 2007.

== Track listing ==
All tracks are written by Hugo Fattoruso and Osvaldo Fattoruso, except where noted.

Side one
No.	Title	Length
1.	"Break It All [re-recorded version]"	2:25
2.	"What A Love [re-recorded version]"	3:04
3.	"Only In Your Eyes [re-recorded version]"	2:14
4.	"Don't Ask Me Love [re-recorded version]" (Osvaldo Fattoruso, Roberto Capobianco)	2:04
5.	"Do Not Disturb"	2:33
6.	"Give Me"	2:29

Side two
No.	Title	Length
7.	"It's Not Bad" (Carlos Vila, Yanos Kolmos)	2:05
8.	"For You And Me"	2:15
9.	"Ticket To Ride [sung in Spanish]" (John Lennon, Paul McCartney)	2:16
10.	"I'm Thinking [re-recorded version]" (Carlos Vila)	2:19
11.	"Won't You Please"	2:20
12.	"Forgive Me [re-recorded version]"	2:23

== Personnel ==
- Hugo Fattoruso – lead vocals (except where noted below), lead guitar, piano, organ, celeste, harmonica, hand-claps
- Osvaldo Fattoruso – backing vocals, rhythm guitar, hand-claps, lead vocals on "Forgive Me [re-recorded version]", shared lead vocals on "What A Love [re-recorded version]" and "I'm Thinking [re-recorded version]"
- Roberto "Pelín" Capobianco – backing vocals, bass guitar, hand-claps
- Carlos "Caio" Vila – backing vocals, drums, percussion, hand-claps
