= Lee Tomboulian =

American jazz musician, composer, arranger and educator

- Born: Leland Diran Tomboulian; January 8, 1960 (age 66); White Plains, New York, U.S.
- Genres: Jazz, bossa nova, Afro-cuban jazz
- Occupations: Musician, educator
- Instruments: Piano, accordion
- Years active: 1980s–present
- Formerly of: One O'Clock Lab Band
- Website: www.leetomboulian.com

Leland Diran Tomboulian (born January 8, 1960) is an American jazz pianist, accordionist, composer, arranger, and educator.

== Early life and career ==
Lee Tomboulian was born in 1960 in White Plains, New York. He is the youngest of four children of Clyde Tomboulian and sculptor Norma Tomboulian. He displayed an affinity for music, in particular for the piano, by age seven, and was given several years of private instruction.

Tomboulian attended the University of Arkansas, majoring in music composition with a minor in theater arts. He continued to live and work in Arkansas for more than a decade, where he met his wife, jazz singer Elizabeth "Betty" Elkins, in the late eighties.

In 1989 he formed the ensemble Circo Verde. The group was influenced by the music of Brazil and Uruguay, particularly Brazilian percussionist Airto Moreira's 1973 album Fingers, whose Uruguayan rhythm section formed their own influential jazz fusion trio, Opa. One of Opa's founding members, Hugo Fattoruso, produced the debut recording of Tomboulian's self-described "pop-latin-jazz" ensemble more than a decade later.

In 1992, Tomboulian married Elizabeth Elkins. The following year, they departed Arkansas for Denton, Texas where Tomboulian attended the University of North Texas as a graduate student, earning a Master of Music in Jazz Studies in 1997. While earning his degree, he performed and recorded with the university's One O'Clock Lab Band, appearing on the CD Lab '97. The album features a track, "B.B.", composed and arranged by Tomboulian. At some point during the Tomboulians' 12-year stay in Denton, Circo Verde's name became simply Circo, under which name its two albums were recorded.

In 2005, the Tomboulians moved to Wisconsin, where Lee served as Instructor of Jazz Piano and Improvisation at Lawrence University Conservatory of Music. He continued in this capacity until 2011, when the couple relocated to New York City. Since then, Tomboulian has released a CD, Imaginarium, with solo piano and overdubbed accordion.

== Discography ==
=== As le.dHe is er ===
- North/South Convergence (Circo Music, 2000)
- Return to Whenever (Lee Tomboulian, 2007)
- Imaginarium (Lee Tomboulian, 2012)

=== As sideman ===
With Kelly Franklin

- Labyrinth (Sidhe Records, 1993)

With Little Jack Melody and his Turks

- World of Fireworks (Carpe Diem, 1994), accordion, piano

With Trout Fishing in America

- Mine! (Trout Records, 1994), accordion, piano
- Who Are These People (Trout Records, 1994), accordion, organ

With Brian Moore

- The Signpost (Brian Moore, 1995)

With The One O'Clock Lab Band

- Lab '97 (North Texas Jazz, 1997)

With The Two O'Clock Jazz Band

- Two O'Clock Jazz Band (1997, Klavier Records), piano
- Moon River (1999, Klavier Records), piano

With Al Gibson

- It's About Time (Al Gibson Music, 1999)

With The UNT Jazz Repertory Ensemble

- Rockin' In Rhythm (North Texas Jazz, 1999, recorded in 1996)

With Tony Hakim

- Summer Place (Grasshopper Records, 2000, rec. btw November 1997 and November 1999)

With Pete Brewer

- Second Wind (Pic Records, 2000), piano – track 3, part 2

With Mary Ellen Spann

- Little Red Robin (China Alley Records, 2002)

With Susan Colin

- Shabbat Favorites (Lowell Music, 2003)
- Every Day: Songs of a Spiritual Life (Jewish Song Service, 2005)

With Faith to Faith

- Worship (Doxology, 2005), piano

With Colin Boyd

- Sincerity (Crystal Clear Sound, 2005), organ

With Lisa Perry

- Tropical Rose (Angel Rose Music, 2005)

With John Adams

- Trios (Congruent Music Co., 2006), keyboard, tracks 1, 7 & 8

With Wycliffe Gordon

- Jazz Celebration Weekend, November 11, 2006: Wycliffe Gordon (Lawrence University Conservatory of Music, 2006), piano

With Maria Schneider

- Jazz Series, June 1, 2007 (Lawrence University Conservatory of Music, 2007), accordion, track 4

With Stuart Dempster

- Stuart Dempster, trombone w[ith] Brian Pertl, didjeridu & Dane Richeson, percussion (Lawrence University Conservatory of Music, 2009), accordion

With Terell Stafford

- Terell Stafford, trumpet: w[ith] Jazz Faculty Trio (Lawrence University Conservatory of Music, 2011)

=== As arranger/composer ===
With The One O'Clock Lab Band

- Lab '97 (North Texas Jazz, 1997), composer – "B.B."

With Al Gibson

- It's About Time (Al Gibson Music, 1999), composer – "Rhoda Ribbon" and "Memory Gardens"

With The Lawrence University Conservatory of Music

- A Concert for Humanity (Lawrence University Conservatory of Music, 2006), composer – "Set for New Orleans" (disc 1, track 16)
- Hybrid Ensemble and Solo Jazz Singers in Concert (Lawrence University Conservatory of Music, 2009), arranger – "Louva-a-Deus" (Milton Nascimento)
- Just Jazz: Hybrid Ensemble (Lawrence University Conservatory of Music, 2010), arranger and lyricist – "Nothing Personal" (Don Grolnick)
