= Otras Canciones =

2019 remix album by No Te Va Gustar

Remix album (re-recorded) by No Te Va Gustar
- Released: 12 April 2019
- Recorded: December 2018
- Length: 53:44
- Label: Bizarro
- Producer: Hector Castillo

No Te Va Gustar chronology
Suenan las Alarmas (2017)	Otras Canciones (2019)	Luz (2021)

Singles from Otras Canciones
- 1. "Chau" Released: 15 February 2019

Otras Canciones (lit. 'Other Songs') is the first remix album by Uruguayan rock band No Te Va Gustar. It was released through Bizarro Records on 12 April 2019. Produced entirely by Héctor Castillo, it features 14 acoustic re-recorded remixes of the band's songs from their previous albums, and includes guests artists Catalina García from Monsieur Periné, Flor de Toloache, Hugo Fattoruso, Jorge Drexler and Draco Rosa.

== Recording and production ==
Otras Canciones was recorded in December 2018, at the Sala Hugo Balzo of the Sodre National Auditorium. It was produced by Héctor Castillo, who had collaborated with the band on the album Suenan las Alarmas (2017).

== Release and promotion ==
The remix of "Chau", a song originally from the album Por lo Menos Hoy (2010), in collaboration with American-born Mexican singer Julieta Venegas, was released as the lead single from the album on 15 February 2019. In a press release, the band stated: "With this luminous collaboration, the song departs noticeably from the original version and at the same time, enhances the attractive and forceful feeling of love and loss of the lyrics."

On 26 March 2019, the group revealed the cover artwork of the record via social media.

It was released on the band's 25th anniversary through Bizarro Records, two hours after an audiovisual special with the same name, broadcast by Vera Más. The album was available for purchase via digital download, streaming, CD and 7-inch vinyl. Otras Canciones was presented at live concerts between 4 and 12 June, and the band also performed at the Semana de la Cerveza Festival in Paysandú.

== Track listing ==
All tracks are produced by Héctor Castillo.

Otras Canciones track listing
No.	Title	Writer(s)	Length
1.	"Comodín"	Emiliano Brancciari	3:00
2.	"Al Vacío" (with Catalina García from Monsieur Periné and Flor de Toloache)	Brancciari	4:49
3.	"Esos Ojos"	Brancciari	2:55
4.	"Cruz de Olvido" (with Flor de Toloache)	Juan Zaizar	2:41
5.	"Chau" (with Julieta Venegas)	Brancciari	5:19
6.	"Me Ilumina Hoy" (with Flor de Toloache)	Brancciari	3:45
7.	"A las Nueve"	Brancciari	3:22
8.	"Clara" (with Hugo Fattoruso)	Brancciari	4:21
9.	"Tirano"	Brancciari	4:09
10.	"De Nada Sirve" (with Jorge Drexler)	Brancciari	3:57
11.	"Te Quedas" (with Flor de Toloache)	Brancciari	3:51
12.	"Verte Reír" (with Flor de Toloache)	Brancciari	3:21
14.	"Poco" (with Draco Rosa)	Brancciari	4:10
15.	"No Era Cierto" (with Flor de Toloache)	Brancciari	3:55

== Charts ==
Chart performance for Otras Canciones
Chart (2019)	Peak position
Uruguayan Albums (CUD)	1
