= Shakers for You =

Shakers For You

Studio album by Los Shakers
- Released: October 1966
- Genre: Pop
- Length: 30:00
- Label: Odeon Pops, Fermata, EMI

Los Shakers chronology
Break It All (1966)	Shakers For You (1966)	La Conferencia Secreta Del Toto's Bar (1968)

Shakers For You is the second studio album by Uruguayan rock band Los Shakers. It was released in October 1966 on the Odeon Pops label.

== Track list ==
All tracks are written by Hugo Fattoruso and Osvaldo Fattoruso, except where noted

Side one
No.	Title	Length
1.	"Nunca Nunca (Never Never)"	1:49
2.	"El Nino Y Yo (The Child And Me)" (Carlos Vila)	2:33
3.	"Escucha Mis Palabras (Hear My Words)"	2:47
4.	"Buscando Dificultades (Picking Up Troubles)"	2:30
5.	"Demasiado Tarde (Too Late)" (Osvaldo Fattoruso, Roberto Capobianco)	2:10
6.	"Dejame Decirte (Let Me Tell You)"	2:50

Side two
No.	Title	Length
7.	"¿Tienes Algun Dinero? (Got Any Money?)"	2:14
8.	"Encontraras A Otra Chica (You'll Find Another Girl)"	2:42
9.	"Sonrie Otra Vez (Smile Again)"	2:36
10.	"Vuelve Mi Amor (Reviens Ma Cherie)" (Hugo Fattoruso, Yanos Kolmos)	2:19
11.	"Siempre Te Esperare (Waiting)"	2:27
12.	"Espero Que Les Guste 042 (I Hope You'll Like It 042)"	2:35

2007 re-issue bonus tracks
No.	Title	Length
13.	"No Molestar (Do Not Disturb)"	2:33
14.	"Quieres Por Favor (Won't You Please)"	2:20
15.	"No Juegues (Stop The Game)"	2:30
16.	"No Esta Mal (It's Not Bad)" (Carlos Vila, Yanos Kolmos)	2:05
17.	"Diles (Tell Them)" (Osvaldo Fattoruso, Roberto Capobianco)	2:38
18.	"Michelle" (John Lennon, Paul McCartney)	2:28
19.	"Muchachita (Girl)" (John Lennon, Paul McCartney)	2:26
20.	"Submarino Amarillo (Yellow Submarine) [sung in Spanish]" (John Lennon, Paul McCartney)	2:48

== Personnel ==
- Hugo Fattoruso – lead vocals (except where noted below), lead guitar, piano, organ, percussion
- Osvaldo Fattoruso – backing vocals, rhythm guitar, percussion
- Roberto "Pelín" Capobianco – backing vocals, bass guitar, percussion, lead vocals on "Diles (Tell Them)"
- Carlos "Caio" Vila – backing vocals, drums, percussion
