= Cada Segundo Dura una Eternidad =

2022 studio album by Emi

Studio album by Emiliano Brancciari
- Released: 16 December 2022
- Studio: GB's Juke Joint (Long Island)
- Genre: Rock; pop; folk
- Length: 47:14
- Label: Little Butterfly Records
- Producer: Héctor Castillo

Singles from Cada Segundo Dura una Eternidad
- 1. "Korea" Released: 30 September 2022; 2. "Rufián" Released: 28 October 2022; 3. "Quise" Released: 25 November 2022

Cada Segundo Dura una Eternidad (lit. 'Every Second Lasts an Eternity') is the debut solo studio album by Argentine-Uruguayan singer-songwriter Emiliano Brancciari, under the stage name Emi. It was released on 16 December 2022 through Little Butterfly Records, written by himself and produced by Héctor Castillo.

== Background ==
Following the release of No Te Va Gustar tenth studio album titled Luz, which was entirely written by Emiliano Brancciari, he continued writing songs for his solo project, without the "pressure" of having to compose for the band. "Shortly afterwards I decided, with the support of my colleagues, to give life to those songs and record them with other musicians; live a different experience than what I am used to", said Brancciari in a press release.

== Composition and production ==
Cada Segundo Dura una Eternidad was recorded in New York City, in GB's Juke Joint, the studio of Venezuelan producer Héctor Castillo, with whom Brancciari had already collaborated on albums for No Te Va Gustar. It was mastered by Dave McNair, and the musicians who participate are Gerry Leonard in guitar, Dan Mintseris, Chris Bruce and Glenn Patscha in keyboards, Jeff Hill in bass and Aaron Steele in drums. Catherine Russell, Federico Lima, Sebastián Prada and Florencia Núñez were background vocalists. According to Sebastián Espósito for La Nación, the work is partly focused on folk music, with the opening track being a reference to León Gieco. A diverse album, it also includes rock, pop and funk music.

Described as an "eclectic" and "personal" album in which he "speaks as an equal with the listener", Brancciari uses influences such as Bob Dylan, Gustavo Cerati and Tom Petty. Its songs were described as "the most personal of his life."

About the title of the album, Brancciari stated:

"It is a phrase that reflects a fairly common situation for all of us at some point in our lives. It can be anguish, anxiety, spending an entire night thinking, thinking, thinking and you want it to be daylight and be done with it. It is more common than one thinks and that song talks about that, about those seconds that become eternal when time does not pass. I found that phrase super graphic and I liked it for the title of the album. It doesn't mean that the album is conceptual and talks about that all the time, because it isn't, but the phrase seemed strong to me."

== Promotion ==
Cada Segundo Dura una Eternidad was preceded by three singles. The first, titled "Korea", which was also his debut single, was released on 30 September 2022. Along with the release of the single, Brancciari also announced the album and its 12 tracks. The second, "Rufián", was released on 28 October, with its music video directed and produced by Oliver Lee Garland, a Brancciari collaborator who directed video clips for No Te Va Gustar. Differentiating itself from "Korea", a folk rock song, "Rufián" is a danceable pop rock track. The third and final single from the record, "Quise", was released on 25 November, a ballad that differs from his previous works.

Brancciari presented the album in February 2023 at La Trastienda in Montevideo, in March in Buenos Aires, and other additional shows in Argentina throughout the year. To promote the album, a series of episodes titled Crónica de una Grabacion, with behind-the-scenes footage of the recordings, directed by Pablo Abdala, former drummer of No Te Va Gustar, was uploaded to Brancciari's YouTube channel.

== Track listing ==
All songs written by Emiliano Brancciari and produced by Héctor Castillo.

1. "Fe En Lo que Yo Quiera" – 3:41
2. "Korea" – 5:09
3. "Que Sigas Bien" – 3:43
4. "El Rey Ha Muerto" (with Jim Keller) – 3:41
5. "Rufián" – 3:24
6. "De Esos Días" – 4:19
7. "Insuperable" – 3:11
8. "Quise" – 4:22
9. "Sirenas" – 3:40
10. "Roma" – 4:31
11. "Yo Lloraré Con Vos" – 3:40
12. "Un Rato Más" – 3:48

== Charts ==
Chart performance for Cada Segundo Dura una Eternidad
Chart (2022–2023)	Peak position
Uruguayan Albums (CUD)	6
