= El Tiempo Otra Vez Avanza =

2014 studio album by No Te Va Gustar

Studio album by No Te Va Gustar
- Released: 9 October 2014
- Recorded: June–July 2014
- Studio: Elefante Blanco (Montevideo); Romaphonic (Buenos Aires)
- Length: 51:34
- Label: Bizarro
- Producer: Joe Blaney

No Te Va Gustar chronology
El Calor del Pleno Invierno (2012)	El Tiempo Otra Vez Avanza (2014)	Suenan las Alarmas (2017)

Singles from El Tiempo Otra Vez Avanza
- 1. "Comodín" Released: 7 September 2014; 2. "Paranoia" Released: 2 February 2015; 3. "Viajando con Espada" Released: 2 December 2015

El Tiempo Otra Vez Avanza (transl. Time Moves Forward Again) is the eighth studio album by Uruguayan rock band No Te Va Gustar, released on 9 October 2014 through Bizarro Records, as a tribute to former band member Marcel Curuchet, after his death in 2012. Produced by Joe Blaney, it features Charly García, Hugo Fattoruso, Zurdo Bessio and Diego Rossberg from Cuatro Pesos de Propina as guests vocalists. It features 12 songs, while the digital edition contains two bonus tracks, including "Llueve Tranquilo".

The record was preceded by the release of the lead single titled "Comodín", and topped the charts in Uruguay, being their second to do so in that country. It received a nomination for Best Rock Album at the 16th annual edition of the Latin Grammy Awards.

== Recording and composition ==
The album was recorded in June and July 2014, at studios Elefante Blanco in Montevideo and Romaphonic in Buenos Aires. Differentiating itself from the band's previous albums, El Tiempo Otra Vez Avanza does not have "explicit" reggae or murga, but it contains inspirations from folk music in the song "Detrás del Cerro", from country music on "Presente" and "Viajando Sin Espada", and acoustic folk rock songs "Alba" and "La Cuerda".

It was described as a "sharp, strong and biting record", that "explodes with the mix of a powerful band, the existentialist lyrics of Emiliano Brancciari and the work of American producer Joe Blaney".

== Release and promotion ==
"Comodín", a song that contains an energetic rock beat, was released on 7 September 2014 as the lead single from the album, along with its music video directed by Gabriel Nicoli, in which appear Argentine singer Cucho Parisi and Argentine actor Favio Posca. "Paranoia", the second single, released on 2 February 2015, contains a music video "based on the story of a musician as famous as he is tormented who is preparing to give a show on a television show". The third single, "Viajando con Espada" was released on 2 December 2015.

The record was presented on 21 March at the Velódromo Municipal in Montevideo, and on 11 and 12 April 2015 at the José Amalfitani Stadium in the Liniers neighborhood of Buenos Aires. The band also performed in Bolivia, Cuba and Paraguay.

== Critical reception ==
Professional ratings
Review scores
Source	Rating
Rolling Stone Argentina	4/5 stars

In a positive review, Rolling Stone Argentina's critic Claudio Kleiman gave El Tiempo Otra Vez Avanza four out of five stars. He stated that the songs "have the characteristic seal of the band, but they show a focus – in the arrangements, the melodies, the lyrics – that turns each of the songs into a rounded, forceful work that grows with each listen."

=== Accolades ===
Year	Ceremony	Category	Result	Ref.
2015	Latin Grammy Awards	Best Rock Album	Nominated	

== Track listing ==
All tracks are written by Emiliano Brancciari and produced by Joe Blaney.

El Tiempo Otra Vez Avanza track listing
No.	Title	Length
1.	"Me Ilumina Hoy"	3:18
2.	"Alba"	3:36
3.	"Detrás del Cerro"	3:44
4.	"Comodín" (with Charly García)	2:49
5.	"Paranoia"	3:38
6.	"Mi Demente"	4:06
7.	"La Cuerda"	3:57
8.	"La Puerta de Atrás" (with Diego Rossberg and Zurdo Bessio)	3:59
9.	"Presente"	2:48
10.	"Solo Vino"	3:33
11.	"Su Sombrero"	4:04
12.	"Viajando Sin Espada" (with Hugo Fattoruso)	3:23
14.	"Madre Nuestra"	3:55
15.	"Llueve Tranquilo"	4:39
Total length:		51:34

== Charts ==
Chart performance for El Tiempo Otra Vez Avanza
Chart (2014)	Peak position
Uruguayan Albums (CUD)	1
