= El Calor del Pleno Invierno =

2012 studio album by No Te Va Gustar

Studio album by No Te Va Gustar
- Released: 18 October 2012
- Length: 45:55
- Label: Bizarro
- Producer: Federico Lima; Sebastián Peralta

No Te Va Gustar chronology
| Por Lo Menos Hoy (2010) | El Calor del Pleno Invierno (2012) | El Tiempo Otra Vez Avanza (2014) |

Singles from El Calor del Pleno Invierno
- 1. "A las Nueve" Released: 19 September 2012

El Calor del Pleno Invierno (transl. The Heat of Midwinter) is the seventh studio album by the Uruguayan rock band No Te Va Gustar, released on 18 October 2012 through Bizarro Records. Produced by Federico Lima and Sebastián Peralta, it contains guest vocals from singers and musicians Fernando Ruiz Díaz, Gabriel Peluffo, Jorge Serrano and Germán Daffunchio.

Preceded by the release of the single "A las Nueve", the album became the band's first number-one in both Uruguay and Argentina, and received a nomination at the 14th annual edition of the Latin Grammy Awards, and three nominations at the 2013 Graffiti Awards.

== Background, release and promotion ==
El Calor del Pleno Invierno was the band's first album without the keyboardist Marcel Curuchet, who died after a motorcycle accident on the New Jersey Turnpike Extension in Jersey City, New Jersey.

On 27 August 2012, the band shared the lyrics for the song "Sin Pena Ni Gloria", included on the album. On 18 September, the band shared a picture with the words "El Calor del Pleno Invierno", hinting that this would be the title of the album. The following day, No Te Va Gustar announced and released the song "A las Nueve", which served as the lead single. The song was written on 8 May 2011, in Barcelona, Spain, and its lyrics were published on social media a day before its release.

The concert tour of the same name, began on 16 March 2013 at the Velódromo Municipal in Montevideo, and continued through different cities across Latin America, including Santiago de Chile, Panama City, Bogotá, Medellín, Arequipa, Cusco, Lima and Quito.

== Accolades ==
| Year | Ceremony | Category | Result | Ref. |
|---|---|---|---|---|
| 2013 | Graffiti Awards | Album of the Year | Nominated | |
| 2013 | Graffiti Awards | Best Rock Album | Nominated | |
| 2013 | Graffiti Awards | Best Pop Album | Nominated | |
| 2013 | Latin Grammy Awards | Best Rock Album | Nominated | |

== Commercial performance ==
El Calor del Pleno Invierno topped the charts in Uruguay and Argentina, becoming their first to do so. Three days after its release, the record was certified Gold and Platinum by the Argentine Chamber of Phonograms and Videograms Producers and the Cámara Uruguaya de Productores de Fonogramas y Videogramas, respectively. In 2013, it was certified double and triple Platinum in those countries.

== Track listing ==
All tracks are written by Emiliano Brancciari and produced by Federico Lima and Sebastián Peralta.

El Calor del Pleno Invierno track listing
| No. | Title | Length |
|---|---|---|
| 1. | "Sin Pena Ni Gloria" | 3:20 |
| 2. | "Nada Fue en Vano" | 3:49 |
| 3. | "A las Nueve" | 3:27 |
| 4. | "Mil Días" (with Fernando Ruiz Díaz) | 3:25 |
| 5. | "Ese Maldito Momento" | 3:05 |
| 6. | "Hijo de las Armas" (with Gabriel Peluffo) | 3:32 |
| 7. | "Por el Agua" | 3:28 |
| 8. | "Religión Pagana" (with Jorge Serrano) | 4:07 |
| 9. | "Destierro" | 2:20 |
| 10. | "El Error" | 4:02 |
| 11. | "Desde Hace un Sueño" (with Germán Daffunchio) | 4:35 |
| 12. | "El Último Jefe" | 3:03 |
| 14. | "Hasta Nunca" | 3:36 |
| Total length: | | 45:55 |

== Charts ==
=== Weekly charts ===
Chart performance for El Calor del Pleno Invierno
| Chart (2012) | Peak position |
|---|---|
| Argentine Albums (CAPIF) | 1 |
| Uruguayan Albums (CUD) | 1 |

=== Year-end charts ===
2012 year-end chart performance for El Calor del Pleno Invierno
| Chart (2012) | Position |
|---|---|
| Argentine Albums (CAPIF) | 8 |
