= La conferencia secreta del Toto's Bar =

Studio album by Los Shakers
- Released: December 1968
- Genre: Psychedelic pop, candombe, bossa nova, psychedelic rock, baroque pop, progressive rock
- Length: 35:00
- Label: Odeon Pops

Los Shakers chronology
Shakers for You (1966)	La conferencia secreta del Toto's Bar (1968)	In the Studio Again (1971)

La conferencia secreta del Toto's Bar is the third studio album by Uruguayan rock band Los Shakers. It was released in December 1968 on the Odeon Pops label.

It has been called the Sgt. Pepper's Lonely Hearts Club Band of Latin America and widely considered one of the most important albums in the history of rock en español.

== Composition ==
According to writer Abril Trigo the album combines "the band's old passions for bossa nova and jazz (what they called calimbo) with popular traditional local genres like tango, candombe, and murga, and includes some powerful arrangements á la John Coltrane and bandoneón solos á la Astor Piazzolla".

== Reception and influence ==
In 2023, Rolling Stone listed La conferencia secreta del Toto's Bar as one of the 50 best Latin American rock albums of all time, calling it "a key step in the emancipation of Latin rock." It was one of four Uruguayan albums to make the list. The Forward called the album "a psychedelic Latin American masterpiece."

The Argentine newspaper Clarín described the album as "today a cult object among Argentine rockers" and "a very personal work and a defined style, beyond the inevitable influences."

The music site Consequence noted the album's strong Sgt. Pepper's influence but says "there are plenty of instances where Los Shakers innovate The Beatles’ formula by incorporating the music of their native Uruguay...La conferencia does justice to both The Beatles and to the rising 1960s Uruguayan music scene."

In giving Los Shakers founder Hugo Fattoruso its Lifetime Achievement Award in 2019, the Latin Recording Academy cited La conferencia as "a definitive masterpiece of the genre."

In a retrospective review, NPR called the album "masterful...La Conferencia Secreta serves as a kind of time capsule of a pivotal moment in 1960s Uruguay: a moment when rock was becoming politicized and a new, far more organic musical sensibility began to take hold." It also noted the album's politically oriented lyrics, such as the title track's retelling of the January 1962 meeting in Punta del Este, Uruguay that led to the expulsion of Cuba from the Organization of American States.

In his essay "Cultural Modalities and Cross-Cultural Connections: Rock across Class and Ethnic Identities," Gustavo Verdesio writes that the album's second track, "Candombe," by featuring Afro-Uruguayan rhythms (candombe), marked "the first time a Latin American or Spanish-speaking rock band added local musical elements to the rock song format in a successful way," forming "the missing link between the clones who sang the English-speaking world hits in Spanish and the Latin American rock that chose a less mimetic path."

The book Rock en Español: The Latin Alternative Rock Explosion lists La conferencia as one of the 100 most important albums in Latin American rock history.

The Uruguayan musician Rubén Rada wrote: "What they did with Toto's Bar was something insane. A masterpiece. The melodies, the harmonies of the voices, the orchestrations, incredible. Very psychedelic. On top of that, they put in a beautiful candombe. And Pelín [Roberto 'Pelín' Capobianco] plays the bandoneon in the Ciruela song, 'Más largo que el Ciruela,' which has a Piazzolla feel to it. It was the first time that a bandoneon was put into rock. You listen to the album today and you die, you can't stop crying."

== Track listing ==
All tracks are written by Hugo Fattoruso and Osvaldo Fattoruso, except where noted.

Side one
No.	Title	Length
1.	"La conferencia secreta del Toto's Bar / Mi tía Clementina"	5:09
2.	"Candombe"	3:19
3.	"Acostumbro a ver TV los martes 36"	2:58
4.	"Una forma de arco iris"	3:03
5.	"Siempre tú"	2:34

Side two
No.	Title	Length
6.	"B.B.B. Band"	2:32
7.	"Yo recuerdo mi mundo"	2:43
8.	"Oh, mi amigo"	2:13
9.	"El pino y la rosa"	3:03
10.	"Señor carretera el encantado"	3:21
11.	"Más largo que el ciruela"	3:29

2007 re-issue bonus tracks
No.	Title	Length
12.	"Aleluya"	1:57
13.	"No llames más por teléfono, nena"	2:40
14.	"Solo bailo samba" (Antonio Carlos Jobim, Vinicius De Moraes)	1:42
15.	"Adorable Lola"	2:19
16.	"Cuando tenga sesenta y cuatro" (Lennon–McCartney)	2:48

== Personnel ==
- Hugo Fattoruso - lead vocals, lead guitar, piano, organ, accordion, celeste, percussion
- Osvaldo Fattoruso - backing vocals, rhythm guitar, drums, percussion, shared lead vocals on "La Conferencia Secreta Del Toto's Bar - Mi Tia Clementina (The Secret Conference of Toto's Bar - My Aunt Clementine)" and "Mas Largo Que El Ciruela (Higher Than My Tower)"
- Roberto "Pelín" Capobianco - backing vocals, bass guitar, bandoneon, cello, percussion
- Carlos "Caio" Vila - backing vocals, drums, percussion
- Unknown: string and brass instruments
