= Suenan las Alarmas =

2017 studio album by No Te Va Gustar

Studio album by No Te Va Gustar
- Released: 2 June 2017
- Recorded: June 2016–March 2017
- Studios: Elefante Blanco (Montevideo); Romaphonic (Buenos Aires); White Water Music (New York City); Bass Station (Brooklyn)
- Genres: Pop-rock; reggae
- Length: 44:14
- Label: Bizarro
- Producer: Hector Castillo

No Te Va Gustar chronology
El Tiempo Otra Vez Avanza (2014)	Suenan las Alarmas (2017)	Otras Canciones (2019)

Singles from Suenan las Alarmas
- 1. "Prendido Fuego" Released: 29 September 2016; 2. "Para Cuando Me Muera" Released: 10 March 2017; 3. "Autodestructivo" Released: 25 July 2017; 4. "Los Villanos" Released: 1 May 2018

Suenan las Alarmas (lit. 'The Alarms Ring') is the ninth studio album by Uruguayan rock band No Te Va Gustar, released on 2 June 2017 via Bizarro Records. It was produced by Héctor Castillo. American band Flor de Toloache and Brazilian singer Herbert Vianna appear as special guests. Suenan las Alarmas became the band's second number-one album in Argentina, and their third in Uruguay.

== Background and release ==
After the band traditionally released albums every two years, the distance between their previous album and their ninth was three years. Suenan las Alarmas was produced and recorded since July 2016, at Elefante Blanco in Montevideo. About the project, the band said: "At the beginning of July we met with producer Héctor Castillo, with the idea of working on two songs to release a single in the spring. It worked so well that we ended up planning an album." Inspired by American band the Killers, Suenan las Alarmas was released through Bizarro Records on 2 June 2017, via CD, streaming and LP record.

== Composition ==
Suenan las Alarmas is a pop-rock and reggae album, in which they also experimented with folk, country, hip-hop and electronic music. According to Montevideo Portal, in the record, the band "confirms their versatility as creators of indestructible songs, but traveling a muddy path from which they do not come out clean."

== Promotion ==
=== Singles ===
"Prendido Fuego", the lead single from the album, was released on 29 September 2016. In a press release, the band stated: "It is the first cut of a work that still does not have a name but a lot of song projects that we really like". The single premiered on Mexican radio stations, and was released along with a music video directed by Federico Musé and produced by Niko Films. It is a pop-rock song with soul music influences, with which the band "renewed its style." The second single, titled "Para Cuando Me Muera", premiered on Billboard and was released on 10 March 2017. The song was described by the record company as "dramatic", a "mid-tempo rock marked by guitars and strong winds flooded with feeling." The third single, titled "Autodestructivo", was released on 25 July 2017. A music video for the song, also directed by Federico Musé, was released on 6 October. It "proposes a parallel universe where the laws of physics defy reality and beings that seem from another galaxy are framed in a story that tells, in symbolic form, the fears and passions that its protagonists experience." "Los Villanos" was released as the fourth and final single from the record on 1 May 2018, on International Workers' Day. The single version of the song featured Dr. Shenka from the Mexican band Panteón Rococó, alongside Flor de Toloache.

=== Live performances ===
No Te Va Gustar embarked on the Suenan las Alarmas Tour in 2018, through Paraguay, Argentina, Uruguay, Mexico and the United States. It culminated on 22 November 2018 at the Estadio de Obras.

== Track listing ==
All tracks are produced by Héctor Castillo.

Suenan las Alarmas track listing
No.	Title	Writer(s)	Length
1.	"Y el Mundo Me Comió a Mí"	Emiliano Brancciari	4:03
2.	"Quería Ser Como Él"	Brancciari	3:59
3.	"Autodestructivo"	Brancciari	3:35
4.	"Guante Blanco"	Brancciari	3:06
5.	"Para Cuando Me Muera"	Brancciari	3:47
6.	"Los Villanos" (with Flor de Toloache)	Brancciari	3:27
7.	"Pegame Más Fuerte" (with Herbert Vianna)	Brancciari	3:33
8.	"Prendido Fuego"	Brancciari	4:17
9.	"Viento a Favor"	Brancciari	3:24
10.	"Desde Que Era un Pibe"	Brancciari	4:32
11.	"Lo Real Es Ya"	Brancciari	3:10
12.	"No Deja de Sonar"	Guzmán Silveira	3:14

== Charts ==
Chart performance for Suenan las Alarmas
Chart (2017)	Peak position
Argentine Albums (CAPIF)	1
Uruguayan Albums (CUD)	1
