= North/South Convergence =

Studio album by Lee Tomboulian
- Released: December 3, 2001
- Recorded: March 2000 at Palmyra Studios in Palmer, Texas
- Genre: Latin jazz
- Label: Circo Records
- Producer: Hugo Fattoruso

Lee Tomboulian chronology
North/South Convergence (2001)	Return to Whenever (2007)

Professional ratings
Review scores
Source	Rating
All About Jazz	favorable

North/South Convergence is the debut studio album for both American keyboardist/composer-arranger Lee Tomboulian and his Latin jazz ensemble Circo, recorded in September 2000 and released on December 3, 2001 by Circo Records.

== Reception ==
All About Jazz critic Dave Hughes gave the album high marks on both conception and execution:

The CD is characterized by consistently interesting percussion, adventurous harmonies, and unpredictable, quirky melodies. The band moves effortlessly across time signatures, shifting from 4 to either 6 or 3. [...] Lee Tomboulian on piano and Pete Brewer on sax and flute contribute well-constructed solos in every rhythmic terrain. Both Tomboulian and bassist Brian Warthen understand that their instruments fulfill rhythmic as well as harmonic roles. [...] This CD truly charts its own course throughout the program. It’s unique and creative, and certainly recommended.

== Track listing ==
All selections composed by Lee Tomboulian except where noted.

1. "Samberg" - 4:46
2. "Ariel" (words from The Tempest by William Shakespeare) - 6:00
3. "Grace" (Betty Tomboulian) - 6:12
4. "Rhoda Ribbon" - 4:08
5. "Circo TV Theme'" - 4:36
6. "Metropolis" (Brian Warthen) - 5:49
7. "Ana" - 4:05
8. "Hinde Who?" - 5:30
9. "Vauda's Song" - 5:07
10. "Six-Fortitude" - 5:03
11. "Memory Gardens" - 6:29
12. "Old 100th" (traditional; arr. Hugo Fattoruso and Lee Tomboulian) - 3:11
13. "O Vendedor de Sonhos" (Fernando Brant - Milton Nascimento) - 2:14

== Personnel ==
External audio
- You may listen to "Memory Gardens" here

- Lee Tomboulian – leader, piano and synths
- Pete Brewer – saxes and flute
- Brian Warthen – bass
- Dennis Durick – conga, bongo, campana
- Ricardo Bozas – percussion
- Betty Tomboulian – vocals
