= Los Shakers (album) =

Studio album by Los Shakers
- Released: July 1965
- Genre: Rock, Pop
- Length: 34:00
- Label: Odeon Pops

Los Shakers chronology
Los Shakers (1965)	Break It All (1966)

Los Shakers is the first studio album by Uruguayan rock band Los Shakers. It was released in July 1965 on the Odeon Pops label.

== Track list ==
All tracks are written by Hugo Fattoruso and Osvaldo Fattoruso, except where noted

Side one
No.	Title	Length
1.	"Rompan Todo (Break It All)"	2:33
2.	"Que Amor (What A Love)"	3:07
3.	"Nena Si, Si (Baby Yeah, Yeah)"	2:20
4.	"No Fuimos (Forgive Me)"	2:29
5.	"Corran Todos (Everybody Shake)"	2:16
6.	"Estoy Pensando (I'm Thinking)" (Carlos Vila)	2:22
7.	"Esta Es Mi Fiesta (It's My Party)" (Walter Gold, Herb Gluck Jr., Herb Weiner, Seymour Gottlieb)	2:15

Side two
No.	Title	Length
8.	"Sigue Buscando (Keep Searching)" (Del Shannon)	2:04
9.	"Para Ti Y Para Mi (For You And Me)"	2:15
10.	"Corro Por Las Calles (Shake In The Streets)"	2:31
11.	"La Larga Noche (The Longest Night)"	2:14
12.	"Nena Baila Shake (Baby Do The Shake)"	2:14
13.	"No Me Pidas Amor (Don't Ask Me Love)" (Osvaldo Fattoruso, Roberto Capobianco)	2:05
14.	"Dame (Give Me)"	2:29

2007 re-issue bonus tracks
No.	Title	Length
15.	"My Bonnie" (traditional, arr. by Tony Sheridan)	2:01
16.	"Solo En Tus Ojos (Only In Your Eyes)"	2:15
17.	"Mas (More)"	2:09
18.	"Boleto Para Pasear (Ticket To Ride) [sung in Spanish]" (John Lennon, Paul McCartney)	2:16
19.	"Hasta Luego Cocodrilo (See You Later Alligator)" (Robert Guidry)	1:59
20.	"Solo Quiero Estar Contigo (I Only Want To Be With You) [sung in French]" (Mike Hawker, Ivor Raymonde)	2:34
21.	"No Fuimos (Forgive Me) [Spanish version]"	2:34
22.	"Nena Baila Shake (Baby Do The Shake) [Spanish version]"	2:14
