= Mireya I. Ramos =

Latin Grammy Award-winning musician, composer, producer, and arranger

- Born: San Juan, Puerto Rico
- Education: Hunter College
- Genres: Mariachi, Salsa, Merengue, Hip-hop
- Instruments: Vocalist, Violin
- Years active: 2007–present
- Member of: Flor de Toloache
- Website: mireyaramos.com

Mireya I. Ramos is a Latin Grammy Award-winning musician, composer, producer, and arranger. She is a founding member of the all-female mariachi group Flor de Toloache and is based in New York City.

Ramos is of Dominican and Mexican descent and was raised in San Juan, Puerto Rico. Her early musical exposure came from her parents' Mexican restaurant, which regularly featured live music from South America, Central America, and the Caribbean. She was a member of the San Juan Children's Choir, with whom she toured for ten years, and also received private violin instruction using the Suzuki method.

== Awards ==
Latin Grammy Awards and Nominations
Year	Nominated work	Category	Result	Notes
2019	"Besos De Mezcal"	Best Regional Song	Nominated	With Flor de Toloache
2019	Indestructible	Best Ranchero/Mariachi Album	Nominated	With Flor de Toloache
2017	Las Caras Lindas	Best Ranchero/Mariachi Album	Won	With Flor de Toloache
2015	Mariachi Flor De Toloache	Best Ranchero Album	Nominated	With Flor de Toloache
