= Por Lo Menos Hoy =

2010 studio album by No Te Va Gustar

Studio album by No Te Va Gustar
- Released: 1 October 2010
- Recorded: June 2010
- Studio: Elefante Blanco (Montevideo)
- Length: 51:09
- Label: Bizarro
- Producer: Juanchi Baleiron

No Te Va Gustar chronology
El Camino Más Largo (2008)	Por Lo Menos Hoy (2010)	El Calor del Pleno Invierno (2012)

Singles from Por Lo Menos Hoy
- 1. "Cero a la Izquierda" Released: September 2010; 2. "Tu Defecto Es el Mío" Released: 2010; 3. "Chau" Released: 2010; 4. "Arde" Released: 2010

Por Lo Menos Hoy (transl. At Least Today) is the sixth studio album by Uruguayan rock band No Te Va Gustar, released on 1 October 2010 via Bizarro Records. The album was preceded by the lead single titled "Cero a la Izquierda", released in September 2010. "Tu Defecto es El Mío", "Chau" and "Arde" were also released as singles.

In 2011, Por Lo Menos Hoy was certified Platinum and Gold by the Cámara Uruguaya de Productores de Fonogramas y Videogramas and Argentine Chamber of Phonograms and Videograms Producers, respectively. The band received their first nominations at the 12th annual edition of the Latin Grammy Awards, participating in the Best Rock Album category.

== Composition and production ==
Produced by Juanchi Baleirón and mixed by Diego Verdier, the album contains the collaboration of Luciano Supervielle, Chango Spasiuk and Fabián Krut as guests artists. According to the band's lead vocalist Emiliano Brancciari, the album "deals with everything from love to discrimination, and from lack of love to domestic violence, to name a few examples". The songs, composed between tours and trips of the band in different cities, were recorded in June 2010 at the studio Elefante Blanco in Montevideo.

== Promotion ==
"Cero a la Izquierda" was released in September 2010 as the lead single from the album, along with a music video directed by Agustín Ferrando. "Tu Defecto Es el Mío" was the second single, and "Chau", considered the album's biggest song commercially, was the third single. "Arde" was released as the fourth and final single from the record.

The band presented Por Lo Menos Hoy at the Estadio Luna Park in Buenos Aires, and in several cities in Spain.

== Accolades ==
Year	Ceremony	Category	Result	Ref.
2011	Latin Grammy Awards	Best Rock Album	Nominated	

== Track listing ==
All tracks are written by Emiliano Brancciari

Por Lo Menos Hoy track listing
No.	Title	Length
1.	"Ángel con Campera"	4:39
2.	"Cero a la Izquierda"	4:09
3.	"Chau"	4:56
4.	"Con el Viento"	1:57
5.	"Arde"	4:35
6.	"Los Indiferentes"	4:50
7.	"Volar"	5:23
8.	"Tu Defecto es El Mío"	3:05
9.	"Memorias del Olvido"	4:57
10.	"Con la Misma Vara"	3:29
11.	"Nunca Más a Mi Lado"	3:31
12.	"El Equilibrista"	5:31
Total length:		51:09

== Charts ==
Chart performance for Por Lo Menos Hoy
Chart (2010)	Peak position
Uruguayan Albums (CUD)	16
