= Ella No Es Tuya =

2020 single by Rochy RD

"Ella No Es Tuya" is a song by Dominican rapper Rochy RD. It was released on July 8, 2020, through Vulcano Music Entertainment, the song obtained a gold record in the United States certified by the RIAA in the Latin category for more than 30,000 units. In February 2021 its remix version was released which had a great impact. The music video for the song has more than 40 million views on YouTube.

== Myke Towers and Nicki Nicole remix ==
"Ella No Es Tuya" (remix)

Single by Rochy RD, Myke Towers and Nicki Nicole
- Released: February 3, 2021
- Genre: Latin R&B
- Length: 4:38
- Label: Sony Latin
- Songwriters: Adreli Ramírez; José Nicael Arroyo; Michael Torres Monge; Nicole Denise Cucco; Raymond Nathanael Rivera Bautista
- Producers: Nata Records; Nicael

Rochy RD singles chronology
"Hoy No Duermo" (2021)	"Ella No Es Tuya" (remix) (2021)	"Vin Diesel" (2021)

Myke Towers singles chronology
"Caundo Bebe" (2021)	"Ella No Es Tuya (Remix)" (2021)	"Quédate Sola" (2021)

Nicki Nicole singles chronology
"Verte" (2020)	"Ella No Es Tuya (Remix)" (2021)	"Venganza" (2021)

Music video
- "Ella No Es Tuya (Remix)" on YouTube

"Ella No Es Tuya (Remix)" is the remix version of the song "Ella No Es Tuya" by the Dominican singer Rochy RD, this time with Puerto Rican rapper and singer Myke Towers and the Argentine rapper Nicki Nicole. It was released on February 3, 2021, through Sony Music Latin. The song was one of the most viral of 2021 and it became top 1 in Spain and Argentina. The music video for the song has more than 140 million views on YouTube.

== Charts ==
Chart performance for "Ella No Es Tuya (Remix)"
Chart (2021)	Peak position
Argentina Hot 100 (Billboard)	2
Bolivia (Monitor Latino)	12
Colombia (National-Report)	28
Costa Rica (Monitor Latino)	13
Dominican Republic (SODINPRO)	3
El Salvador (Monitor Latino)	11
Global 200 (Billboard)	39
Guatemala (Monitor Latino)	17
Nicaragua (Monitor Latino)	10
Paraguay (Monitor Latino)	16
Paraguay (SGP)	12
Peru (Monitor Latino)	14
Spain (Promusicae)	1
US Hot Latin Songs (Billboard)	30

== Certifications ==
Region	Certification	Certified units/sales
Argentina (CAPIF) Remix version	2× Platinum	40,000^{*}
Spain (Promusicae) Remix version	4× Platinum	400,000^{‡}
United States (RIAA)	Gold (Latin)	30,000^{‡}
United States (RIAA) Remix version	Platinum (Latin)	60,000^{‡}
^{*} Sales figures based on certification alone.^{‡} Sales+streaming figures based on certification alone.
