= Graffiti Awards =

- Awarded for: Music
- Location: National Auditorium of Sodre
- Country: Uruguay
- First award: 2003
- Website: www.premiosgraffiti.com.uy

The Graffiti Awards (Spanish: Premios Graffiti) are honors recognizing achievement in Uruguayan music. They were created in 2003.

== History ==
When they were first established in 2003, the Graffiti Awards only rewarded Uruguayan rock. In subsequent years they became more representative, and went on to reward all genres of the music of Uruguay.

Since 2014, the ceremony has been held at the National Auditorium of Sodre.

== Categories ==
Of the 35 categories awarded, three are chosen by popular vote through the Internet: Artist of the Year, Album of the Year, and Theme of the Year. The Graffiti Career Award has been granted to musicians such as Jaime Roos, Hugo and Osvaldo Fattoruso, Gabriel Peluffo and Gustavo Parodi, Gastón Ciarlo, Rubén Rada, Jorge Galemire, José Carbajal, Jorge Nasser, Larbanois – Carrero, Fernando Cabrera, and Los Olimareños.

- Album of the Year
- Artist of the Year
- Theme of the Year
- Best Alternative Rock and Pop Album
- Best Art Design
- Best Book on Uruguayan Music
- Best Candombe Fusion Album
- Best Children's Music Album
- Best Christian Inspiration Album
- Best Composer
- Best Cumbia Pop Album
- Best Duo or Band
- Best Electronic Album
- Best Female Solo
- Best Folklore Album
- Best Hip Hop Album
- Best Indie Album
- Best Instrumental Music Album
- Best Jazz Fusion Album
- Best Live Album
- Best Male Solo
- Best Metal and Hard Rock Album
- Best Music DVD
- Best New Artist
- Best Pop Album
- Best Popular Music and Urban Song Album
- Best Producer
- Best Reggae and Ska Album
- Best Reissue
- Best Religious Music Album
- Best Rock and Blues Album
- Best Special Edition
- Best Tango Album
- Best Tropical Music Album
- Best Video
- Career
