= Opa (Uruguayan band) =

Uruguayan-American jazz fusion band

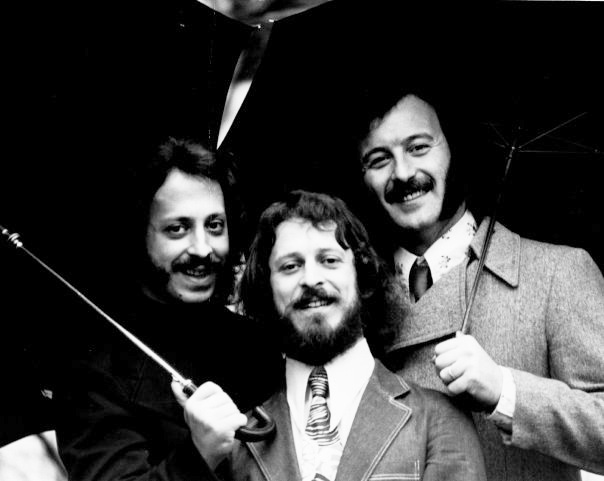
- Opa in 1981

Background information
- Origin: Uruguay
- Genres: Latin rock Jazz fusion Candombe rock Candombe Jazz
- Years active: 1969–1977; 1981; 1987; 2004
- Members: Hugo Fattoruso; George Fattoruso; Ringo Thielmann; Ruben Rada

Opa were an American jazz fusion band made up of Uruguayan members. They started in the 1970s, and released two albums in the US: Goldenwings (Milestone Records M-9069, 1976) and Magic Time (Milestone Records M-9078, 1977). Both were produced by Brazilian musician and composer Airto Moreira.

After the breakup of Los Shakers in 1968, brothers Hugo and Osvaldo Fattoruso recorded the album "La Bossa Nova de Hugo y Osvaldo" to fulfil their contract with Odeon Records. Hugo "Ringo" Thielmann, a former bandmate of the Fattoruso brothers in The Hot Blowers (a jazz group that predated Los Shakers), had settled in the United States and contacted the Fattoruso brothers in order to form a band. As a trio, they began playing in clubs until they were discovered by Airto Moreira.

The band consisted of Hugo Fattoruso, George Fattoruso and Hugo "Ringo" Thielmann, plus guest artists Hermeto Pascoal, David Amaro, Barry Finnerty, Flora Purim, Ruben Rada, Gary Gazaway, Jose Pedro Beledo, etc. Opa had played on previous albums by Airto Moreira, like Fingers (CTI Records CTL 18), released in 1973, and Deodato/Airto in concert (CTI Records CTI 6041), released in 1974.

== Band members ==
- Hugo Fattoruso - keyboards, vocals
- George (Osvaldo) Fattoruso - drums
- Hugo "Ringo" Thielmann - bass, vocals

=== Guest artists ===
- Samuel Guarin - flute, percussion
- David Amaro - guitar
- Barry Finnerty - guitar
- Airto Moreira - percussion
- Flora Purim - vocals
- Ruben Rada - percussion, vocals
- Jorge Fattoruso - percussion, drums, vocals
- Gary Gazaway - trumpet
- Jose Pedro Beledo - guitar

== Discography ==
- Back Home (1975, OPA's demo tape recorded with a four-track Teac 3440 by Larry Rosen in July–August 1975 at 'Holly Place Studio' (NY), released in 1996)
- Goldenwings (Milestone, 1976)
- Magic Time (Milestone, 1977)
- A Los Shakers Otroshakers (Sazam, 1981)
- Opa en vivo (Orfeo, 1988)
- Opa en vivo 87' & rarities (2001)

== Awards ==
- 6 golden records (given by Discolandia)
- 1 golden record (given by Musart, México D.F)
- 4 platinum records (Discolandia)
