= No Toque Mi Naik =

2021 single by Nicki Nicole and Lunay

Single by Nicki Nicole and Lunay
- Released: March 24, 2021
- Length: 2:23
- Label: Dale Play; Sony Music
- Songwriters: Nicole Denise Cucco; Jefnier Osorio Moreno; Daniel Rondón; Facundo Yalve; Mauro De Tomasso; Rafael Rodríguez
- Producers: HoneyBoos; Evlay; Mauro De Tomasso

Nicki Nicole singles chronology
"Venganza" (2021)	"No Toque Mi Naik" (2021)	"Tu Fanático (Remix)" (2021)

Lunay singles chronology
"Sin Ropa" (2021)	"No Toque Mi Naik" (2021)	"Le Gusta Que La Vean" (2021)

Music video
- "No Toque Mi Naik" on YouTube

"No Toque Mi Naik" (transl. "Don't Touch My Nike") is a song by Argentine rapper Nicki Nicole and Puerto Rican singer Lunay. It was released on March 24, 2021, through Dale Play Records and Sony Music Latin. The song was produced by HoneyBoos, Evlay and Maro De Tomasso. It reached number 16 on the Argentina Hot 100 and has more than 20 million streams on Spotify.

== Music video ==
The music video for the song was directed by La Tara, showing Nicki Nicole and Lunay on ATVs with their friends. The video has more than 20 million views on YouTube. It became number one in YouTube Argentina trends.

== Live performances ==
On April 27, 2021, Nicki Nicole was invited to The Tonight Show Starring Jimmy Fallon, where she performed her first single "Wapo Traketero" and "No Toque Mi Naik" with the participation of Lunay, the video on YouTube already has more than five million views.

== Charts ==
Chart performance for "No Toque Mi Naik"
Chart (2021)	Peak position
Argentina Hot 100 (Billboard)	16
Paraguay (SGP)	29
Puerto Rico (Monitor Latino)	12
Spain (Promusicae)	52
Uruguay (Monitor Latino)	15
US Latin Airplay (Billboard)	45
US Latin Pop Airplay (Billboard)	11
US Latin Rhythm Airplay (Billboard)	25

== Certifications ==
Region	Certification	Certified units/sales
Argentina (CAPIF)	Platinum	20,000^{*}
United States (RIAA)	Gold (Latin)	30,000^{‡}
^{*} Sales figures based on certification alone.^{‡} Sales+streaming figures based on certification alone.
