= Venganza (song) =

2021 single by No Te Va Gustar and Nicki Nicole

Single by No Te Va Gustar and Nicki Nicole

from the album Luz
- Released: 5 March 2021
- Recorded: 2020
- Genre: Hard rock
- Length: 3:22
- Label: Elefante Blanco
- Songwriters: Emiliano Brancciari; Nicole Denise Cucco
- Producer: Hector Castillo

No Te Va Gustar singles chronology
"No Te Imaginás" (2021)	"Venganza" (2021)	"Dejo Atrás" (2021)

Nicki Nicole singles chronology
"Ella No Es Tuya" (remix) (2021)	"Venganza" (2021)	"No Toque Mi Naik" (2021)

Music video
- "Venganza" on YouTube

"Venganza" is a song by Uruguayan band No Te Va Gustar in collaboration with Argentine singer Nicki Nicole, released on 5 March 2021 as the second single from the band's tenth studio album, Luz (2021). Written by its lead vocalist Emiliano Brancciari and Nicole, and produced by Hector Castillo, it is a hard rock track. The lyrics are from the perspective of a victim of gender-based violence.

== Background ==
After releasing their first remix album titled Otras Canciones, which contains different versions of songs from their previous albums, the band confirmed that they had begun work on their tenth studio album in December 2020. Recorded in a studio set up from scratch in the middle of the field in José Ignacio, Uruguay, Luz was announced in parallel with its first single, "No Te Imaginás", which was released on 8 January 2021. The band announced via social media the release of a second single, "Venganza", on 25 February.

== Concept ==
The hard rock song has a feminist concept, in which "it seeks justice and an end to gender violence", as well as "greater equality between men and women". "Venganza" has been described as a "female empowerment anthem", released around the time of International Women's Day.

In 2010, No Te Va Gustar released a song, "Siempre Más a Mi Lado", which had a similar concept, with which they worked with organizations against gender-based violence. In an interview for El Espectador, the band's vocalist Emiliano Brancciari explained that the "powerful" song's title is very symbolic, "because no one wants revenge but justice, but when it does not come it is like a desperate cry."

== Music video ==
The music video for "Venganza", which was released along with the song, was directed by Israel Adrián Caetano, produced by Ska Films, and starring the Argentine actor Claudio Rissi, along with the artists.

== Charts ==
Chart performance for "Venganza"
Chart (2021)	Peak position
Argentina Hot 100 (Billboard)	39
