= Los Shakers =

Uruguayan rock band

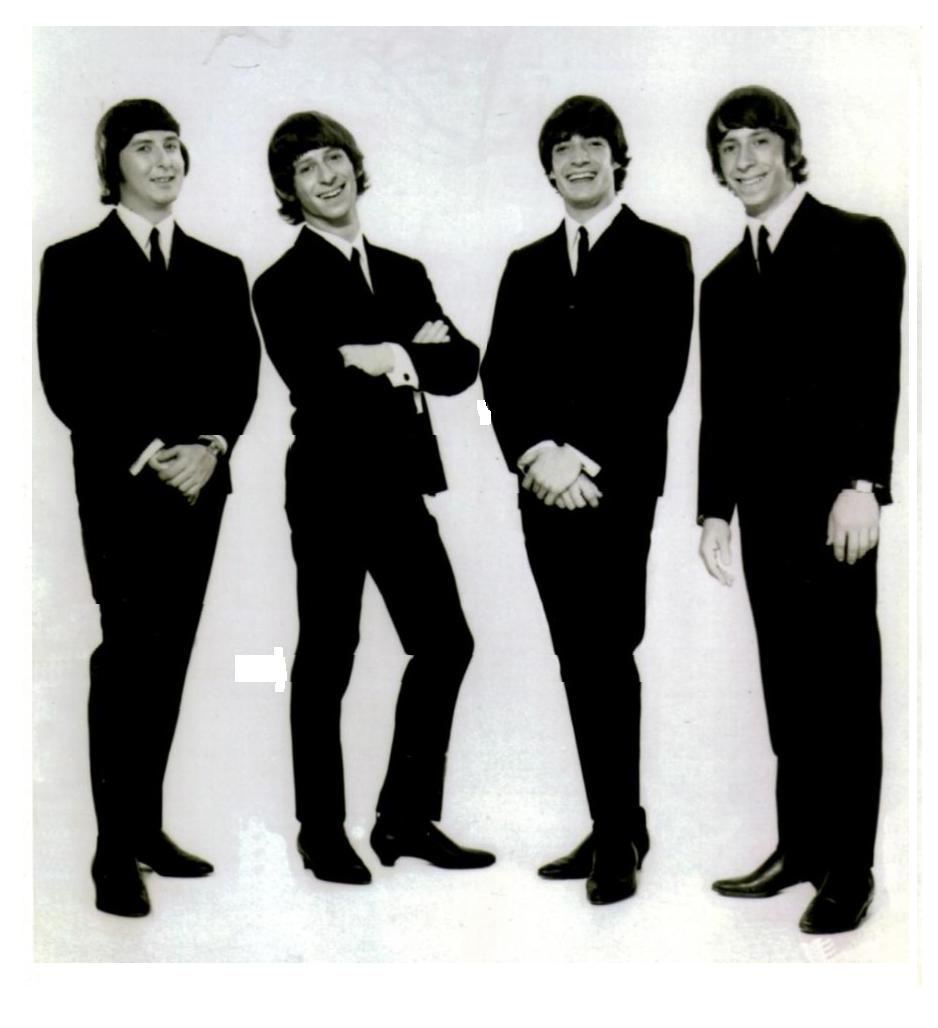

Background information
- Origin: Montevideo
- Genres: Rock, proto-punk, garage rock, beat music, psychedelic rock
- Years active: 1964–1969, 1971, 2005
- Label: EMI
- Members: Hugo Fattoruso; Osvaldo Fattoruso †; Roberto "Pelín" Capobianco †; Carlos "Caio" Vila †

Los Shakers were a popular rock band in the 1960s and was a part of the Uruguayan Invasion in Latin America. They were heavily influenced by the look and sound of The Beatles. In the late 1960s they would broaden and expand their musical direction before breaking up in 1969.

== History ==
The band was formed in 1964 in Montevideo, Uruguay by brothers Hugo (lead guitar and keyboards) and Osvaldo Fattoruso (rhythm guitar), after watching the movie A Hard Day's Night starring The Beatles. They were modeled after The Beatles and even adopted similar haircuts and clothing. As DJ Gaylord Fields put it, "Hugo, Osvaldo, Pelin and Caio are the Realest Fake Beatles to ever record — and, like their role models (but unlike practically every other Moptops manqué), they were as uncannily accomplished at bringing forth the psychedelic Pepperisms as the Merseybeat."

The band sang many songs in English, despite their location, and gained their greatest popularity in Argentina, but also had popularity in other Latin American countries. They signed with the Odeon label of EMI in Argentina. The first single recorded as The Shakers was "Break it All" in late 1964, which reached number 9 on Argentine charts. A self-titled album was released later in 1965. Though the band focused their attentions almost exclusively on Latin America, they did take one crack at the English-speaking market when they released the album Break It All, on the US-based Audio Fidelity Records in 1966. The record (which featured re-recorded versions of many of the songs on their original LP and even a Spanish-language version of The Beatles' "Ticket to Ride") was little more than a curiosity in the United States and was not a hit, but became a collector's item decades later, as did their second album, Shakers for You (released in 1966). Both albums were re-issued, with bonus tracks, on CD in 2007. In 2020, the Spanish/Catalonian label Guerssen Records remastered and reissued their first four albums on vinyl.

Reflecting the move towards psychedelia, their music went in a new direction. Their last studio album with the original line up, La conferencia secreta del Toto's Bar, released in 1968, mixed psychedelic influences with candombe and some tango sounds; the album has been described as a Latin American Sgt. Pepper's Lonely Hearts Club Band. However, their recording label (EMI) did not support this musical shift, and left them without any promotion or support; it led to the band's break-up. In 2005, the original lineup re-united, and recorded a CD Bonus Tracks and played in Argentina and Uruguay. Los Shakers would break up shortly thereafter.

Osvaldo Fattoruso, guitarist and drummer, died on July 29, 2012, due to cancer at the age of 64.

== Members ==
- Hugo Fattoruso - lead vocals, guitar, piano, harmonica
- Osvaldo Fattoruso - guitar, vocals
- Roberto "Pelín" Capobianco - bass guitar, bandoneon, backing vocals
- Carlos "Caio" Vila - drums, backing vocals

== Discography ==
=== Albums ===
Title	Details
Los Shakers	Released: July 1965; Label: Odeon Pops; Formats: LP
Break It All	Released: January 1966; Label: Audio Fidelity; Formats: LP
Shakers for You	Released: October 1966; Label: Odeon Pops; Formats: LP
La conferencia secreta del Toto's Bar	Released: December 1968; Label: Odeon Pops; Formats: LP
En el estudio otra vez	Released: 1971; Label: Parlophone; Formats: LP
A Los Shakers	Released: 1981; Formats: LP
Bonus Tracks	Released: 2005; Formats: CD

=== Singles ===
Year	Title	Album
1965	"Sigue Buscando (Keep Searching)" / "Solo En Tus Ojos (Only In Your Eyes)"	Los Shakers
1965	"Rompan Todo (Break It All)" / "Más (More)"	Los Shakers
1965	"No Molestar (Do Not Disturb)" / "Déjame Ir (Let Me Go)"	Break It All
1966	"Quieres Por Favor (Won't You Please)" / "No Está Mal (It's Not Bad)"	Break It All
1966	"Diles (Tell Them)" / "No Juegues (Stop The Game)"	Non-album single
1966	"Michelle" / "My Bonnie"	Non-album single
1966	"Oh Mi Amigo (Oh My Friend)" / "Siempre Tú (Always You)"	La conferencia secreta del Toto's Bar
1966	"Muchachita (Girl)" / "Déjame Solo (Let Me Alone)"	Non-album single
1966	"Submarino Amarillo (Yellow Submarine)" / "Espero Que Les Guste 042 (I Hope You'll Like It 042)"	Non-album single
1966	"Nunca Nunca (Never Never)" / "Déjame Decirte (Let Me Tell You)"	Shakers for You
1967	"Pelota De Goma Roja (Red Rubber Ball)" / "No Llames Más Por Teléfono, Nena (Don't Call Me On The Telephone Anymore, Baby)"	Non-album single
1967	"La Tierra De Las Mil Danzas (The Land Of A Thousand Dances)" / "Aleluya (Hallelujah)"	Non-album single
1967	"Marilú (Peek-A-Boo)" / "Si Lo Supiera Mamá (If I Knew Mother)"	Non-album single
1967	"Cuando Tenga Sesenta Y Cuatro (When I'm Sixty-Four)" / "Adorable Lola (Lovely Lola)"	Non-album single
1968	"Mi Tía Clementina (My Aunt Clementine)" / "El Pino Y La Rosa (The Pine And The Rose)"	La conferencia secreta del Toto's Bar
2019	"La Marañanza"	Non-album single

=== Compilations ===
Title	Details
Archivo Secreto	Released: 1967; Label: Odeon Pops; Formats: LP
La Vigencia De Los Shakers	Released: 1976; Label: EMI; Formats: LP
Los Ineditos De Los Shakers	Released: 1977; Label: EMI; Formats: LP
All the Best	Released: 1999; Label: Hitland; Formats: CD
¡Por Favor!	Released: 2000; Label: Big Beat Records; Formats: CD
Los Shakers + Shakers for You	Label: Circolo Del Disco Produzione; Formats: CD

== See also ==
- Los Mockers
