= Luz (No Te Va Gustar album) =

Studio album by No Te Va Gustar
- Released: May 7, 2021
- Recorded: 2020–2021
- Genre: Rock
- Length: 45:05
- Language: Spanish
- Label: Bizarro
- Producer: Héctor Castillo

No Te Va Gustar chronology
Otras Canciones (2019)	Luz (2021)	Portal Sessions: No Te Va Gustar (2024)

Singles from Luz
- 1. "No Te Imaginás" Released: January 8, 2021; 2. "Venganza" Released: March 5, 2021; 3. "Dejo Atrás" Released: April 16, 2021; 4. "La Rama" Released: May 7, 2021; 5. "Josefina" Released: July 1, 2021; 6. "Mi Ausencia" Released: October 15, 2021

Luz (lit. 'Light') is the tenth studio album by Uruguayan rock band No Te Va Gustar. It was released on May 7, 2021, by Bizarro Records. The album was produced by Hector Castillo and written by Emiliano Brancciari. Guest vocals include Argentine singers Nicki Nicole and Ricardo Mollo.

At the 22nd Annual Latin Grammy Awards, the album was nominated for Best Rock Album, while "Venganza" was nominated for Best Rock Song. The album won the Album Of The Year award at the Graffiti Awards in 2022, given to recognize the best in Uruguayan music.

== Background and release ==
In December 2020, the band confirmed that they had begun work on their tenth studio album, revealed the album's title, Luz, and announced "No Te Imaginás" as the album's first single. It was released on January 8, 2021. Luz is the first album without percussionist Gonzalo Castex, a musician who was part of the band's original formation, who decided to leave the group after a personal decision.

It was recorded in José Ignacio, Uruguay, where they set up a studio from scratch in the middle of the field. "After a period of celebrations and revisionism for the 25 years of the band, it was time to look forward, to what we like the most. And what better way to do it than with an album of new songs? In moments where everything seems tend to darken, we find light in creativity, in camaraderie, in wanting to be together", said the leader of the band, Emiliano Brancciari.

On March 5, 2021, they released the second single from the album titled "Venganza", together with the Argentine singer Nicki Nicole, which received mixed reviews from the public. "Dejo Atrás", the third single, was released on April 16, 2021.

On May 7, 2021, along with the release of the album, the song "La Rama" was released as a single. "Josefina" and "Mi Ausencia" were released as the last singles from the album in July and October respectively.

== Critical reception ==
Professional ratings
Review scores
Source	Rating
Rolling Stone Argentina	3/5 stars

In a review for Rolling Stone Argentina, Sebastián Chaves gave the album 3 out of 5 stars. He praised its "Río de la Plata sound, correctly contained & conducted melodies, chordal accompaniment and lyrics that contemplate intrapersonal tribulations that arise as echoes of interpersonal relationships". He compared its traditional rock to Andrés Calamaro and Fernando Cabrera and highlighted the "generational spectrum that he can encompass" in terms of its collaborations with Nicki Nicole and Ricardo Mollo.

=== Accolades ===
Year	Ceremony	Category	Result	Ref.
2021	Latin Grammy Awards	Best Rock Album	Nominated	
2022	Graffiti Awards	Best Rock Album	Nominated	
2022	Graffiti Awards	Best Group Album Of The Year	Nominated	
2022	Graffiti Awards	Album Of The Year	Won	

== Track listing ==
All songs were produced by Hector Castillo and written by Emiliano Brancciari, except where noted.

Luz track listing
No.	Title	Writer(s)	Length
1.	"La Rama"		4:13
2.	"Como Un Animal"		3:49
3.	"Mi Ausencia"		4:32
4.	"Josefina"		2:40
5.	"Venganza" (with Nicki Nicole)	Emiliano Brancciari; Nicki Nicole	3:24
6.	"Dejo Atrás"		3:41
7.	"No Te Imaginás"		3:31
8.	"Mejor Callar"		3:55
9.	"Austro" (with Ricardo Mollo)		4:17
10.	"Debí"		3:03
11.	"Con Las Ganas"	Brancciari; Pablo Coniberti	3:44
12.	"Yendo"		4:11
Total length:			45:05

== Charts ==
Chart performance for Luz
Chart (2021)	Peak position
Uruguayan Albums (CUD)	1
