= Jorge Nasser =

Uruguayan singer, producer and composer (born 1956)

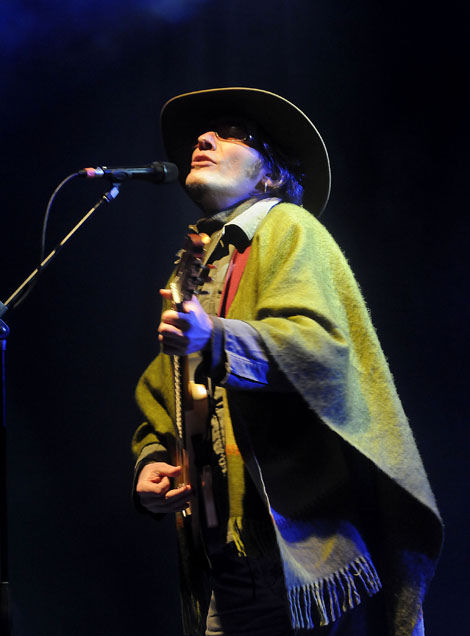
- Jorge Nasser in 2011.
- Born: Jorge Nasser Cabrera; 6 December 1956 (age 69); Montevideo, Uruguay
- Occupations: singer, composer, productor
- Children: Francisco, Simón, Martín

Jorge Nasser (born 6 December 1956) is a Uruguayan singer, productor and composer.

He used to be a member of the band Níquel.
