= Flor de Toloache =

American mariachi group

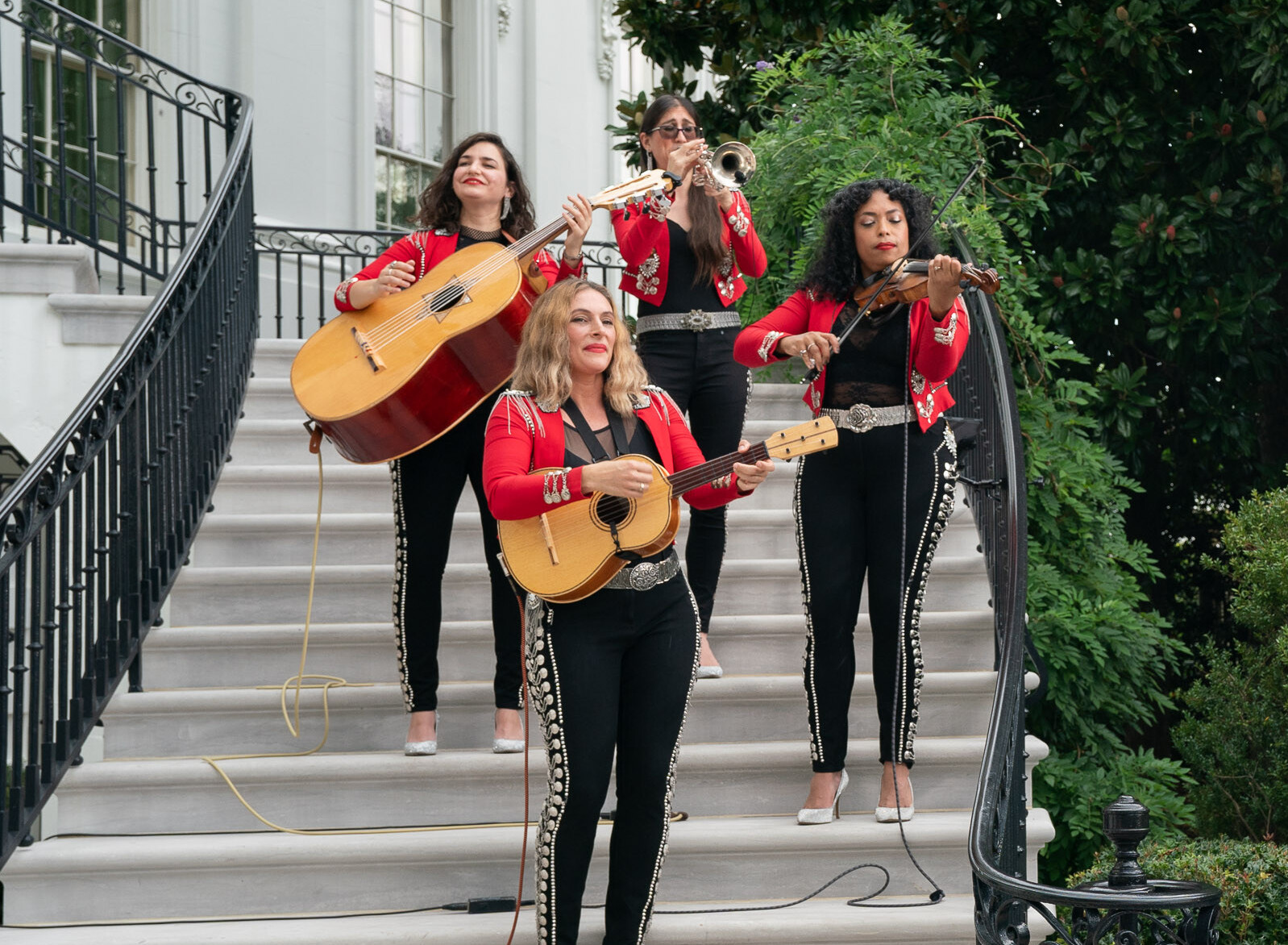
- Flor de Toloache at the White House in 2021

Background information
- Origin: New York City
- Genres: Mariachi
- Years active: 2008–present
- Labels: oneRPM; Chulo Records; Craft Recordings
- Website: flordetoloache.komi.io

Flor de Toloache is an all-female mariachi band based in New York City and founded by Mireya I. Ramos and Shae Fiol in 2008.

Flor de Toloache first began playing in the New York City subways where they were noticed by numerous media outlets including the New York Times. In 2014, they released their first album Mariachi Flor de Toloache and in 2016 they toured with The Arcs after having contributed to their album Yours, Dreamily. In 2017, they won a Latin Grammy for "Best Ranchero/Mariachi Album" for their second studio album Las Caras Lindas. In 2019, they were nominated for a Grammy for "Best Latin Rock, Urban or Alternative Album" for their third studio album Indestructible, which was produced by Rafa Sardina and includes collaborations with notable artists including John Legend, Miguel, Camilo Lara, and Alex Cuba.

== Members ==
As of 2022

- Mireya I. Ramos – vocals, violin, guitarrón (bandleader)
- Shae Fiol – vocals, vihuela (bandleader)
- Julia Acosta – trumpet, vocals (former bandleader)
- Anna Garcia – trumpet
- Elena Lacayo – guitarrón, vocals

Former members include:

- Domenica Fossati – flute
- Luisa Bastidas – violin
- Jackie Coleman – trumpet
- Sita Borahm Chay – violin
- Lisa Maree Dowling – bass, guitarrón
- Jacquelene Acevedo – percussion
- Rachel Therrien – trumpet
- Yesenia Reyes Huerta– guitarrón
- Blanca Gonzales — violin
