= Osvaldo Fattoruso =

Uruguayan musician

- Born: May 12, 1948
- Died: July 29, 2012 (aged 64) Montevideo, Uruguay
- Genres: Latin rock, Candombe, Jazz rock, Jazz fusion, Progressive rock
- Instruments: Drums, Guitar
- Formerly of: Los Shakers, Opa (Uruguayan band)

Jorge Osvaldo Fattoruso Dorci (12 May 1948 – 29 July 2012) was a Uruguayan musician.

He introduced rock in Latin America with his band Los Shakers, and also created a fusion between jazz, rock and African rhythms together with his brother Hugo Fattoruso in Opa (Uruguayan band).

After living several years in the United States, he returned to Uruguay in 1981 and performed live with Opa at the Cine Teatro Plaza, a historic performance in his country by a band that was already a cult favorite.

That same year, 1981, he formed the group Barcarola with his brother Hugo, María de Fátima (Hugo's wife at the time), Pippo Spera, Eduardo Márquez, and Susana Bosch. They performed live at the Teatro Stella and the Luis Franzini Stadium. Brazilian Geraldo Azevedo, author of some of Barcarola's songs, was a guest at the latter show.

In 1982 he settled in Buenos Aires, playing with musicians such as Miguel Abuelo, Litto Nebbia, Luis Alberto Spinetta, Alejandro Lerner, León Gieco and Fito Páez, among others, and being part of Rubén Rada's band, recording on all his albums from En familia (1982) to Pa'los uruguayos (1989).

Fattoruso died on July 29, 2012 at the age of 64 and is buried at the Cementerio del Norte, Montevideo.

He was the brother of Hugo Fattoruso and Sylvia Veronica Fattoruso.
