= Emiliano Brancciari =

Argentine singer-songwriter (born 1977)

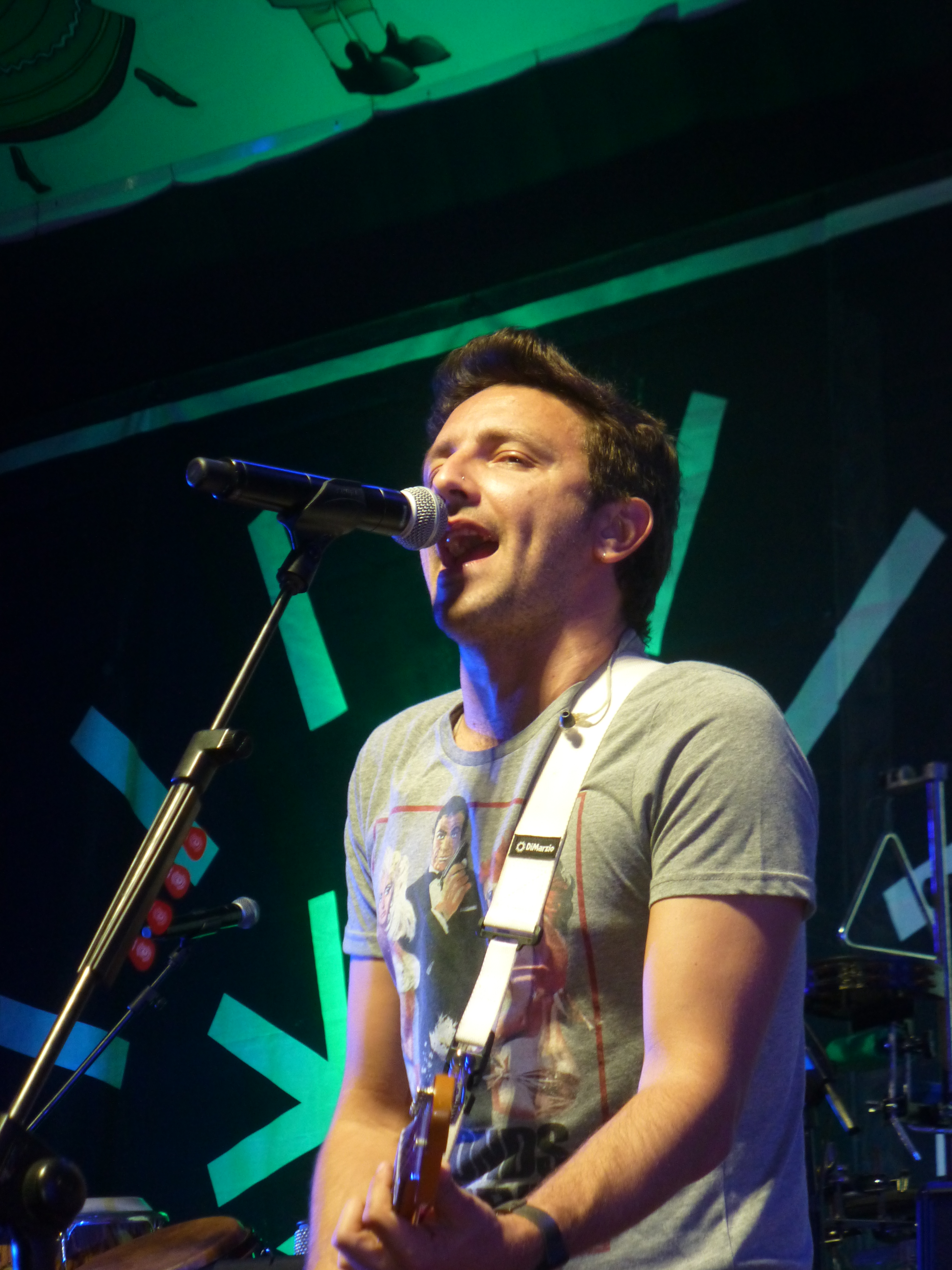
- Brancciari in 2013
- Born: Emiliano Germán Brancciari Amarillo; 28 October 1977 (age 48); Munro, Buenos Aires, Argentina
- Other name: Emi
- Citizenship: Argentine - Uruguayan
- Occupations: Singer; songwriter; musician
- Years active: 1994–present
- Children: 1
- Musical career
- Genres: Rock; pop; folk
- Instruments: Vocals; guitar
- Label: Little Butterfly Records
- Member of: No Te Va Gustar

Emiliano Germán Brancciari Amarillo (born 28 October 1977), also known mononymously as Emi (often stylised in all caps), is an Argentine-Uruguayan singer-songwriter and musician. He rose to prominence as the lead vocalist, guitarist and founder of the Uruguayan rock band No Te Va Gustar. In addition to getting Latin Grammy nominations with the band, Brancciari received four nominations for Best Composer at the Graffiti Awards, of which he won two.

After participating in several singles as a solo artist, Brancciari released his debut studio album, Cada Segundo Dura una Eternidad, in 2022. In December 2023, he announced that his second album will be released in the first half of the following year.

== Early life ==
Emiliano Germán Brancciari Amarillo, son of a Uruguayan mother and Argentine father, was born on 28 October 1977 in Munro, Buenos Aires, in a middle class home. He spent his childhood in a humble house in Boulogne. Interested in music from a young age, at the age of 7 he began playing the guitar. As a teenager he moved to Montevideo with his mother, after his parents separated, where he settled permanently. In that city, he studied at Liceo n°10 in the Malvín neighborhood.

== Career ==
=== 1994–present: Beginnings with No Te Va Gustar ===
In 1994, Brancciari began his musical career after creating a band with his high school classmates and performing at a festival in a square in his native neighborhood. After changes in the group's lineup, they consolidated themselves as a trio, along with Mateo Moreno on bass and Pablo Abdala on drums. They accidentally chose the band's name, "No Te Va Gustar" (You won't like it). Months later, more musicians joined the band, with the inclusion of percussion. After reaching first place in two band competitions in Montevideo and performing in various places, in July 1999 they began recording their first studio album with the artistic production of Juan Campodónico, Solo de Noche, which was released in December. No Te Va Gustar second album, titled Este Fuerte Viento que Sopla, was certified Gold by the Cámara Uruguaya de Productores de Fonogramas y Videogramas within its first six months of release.

=== 2021–present: First solo albums ===
Brancciari said, in an interview with Montevideo Portal, that his need to create a solo project was born "by chance." Upon the release of No Te Va Gustar tenth studio album Luz in 2021, Brancciari continued writing and composing songs during the quarantine due to the COVID-19 pandemic, although "without the pressure of having to compose for the band." That material led him to release his first solo album, titled Cada Segundo Dura una Eternidad (2022), which was preceded by three singles: "Korea", "Rufian" and "Quise". The album was recorded in the United States, produced by the band's collaborator Héctor Castillo and released through Little Butterfly Records. According to Gabriel Plaza of Infobae, the result of the album was "twelve songs of brutal honesty." It was presented for the first time in February 2023 in a sold-out show at La Trastienda de Montevideo, and supported by a concert tour through Argentina and Uruguay, along with Pablo Abdala, Enrique Anselmi, Gonzalo Vivas, Lula Isnardi and Lucía Romero.

Between June and September 2023, he participated on several singles, including the acoustic remix of the song "Tan Distintos", with the band Guasones. His song "Imposible", produced by Nicolás Cottón, was released in December, being the first preview of his upcoming second studio album as a solo artist, which he plans to release in 2024.

== Artistry ==
Brancciari stated that in his adolescence with his friends "they enjoyed music, especially rock," which inspired him in his career as a musician. His solo project has been described as a "sound universe" that goes from folk and pop to rock. According to TN, Brancciari's most notable influences are Bob Dylan, Gustavo Cerati and Tom Petty. He praised the "depth" in Alfredo Zitarrosa's voice, and stated that his song "Zamba por Vos" represents a return to his childhood in Buenos Aires.

== Personal life ==
Brancciari obtained Uruguayan nationality after moving to Montevideo. Regarding his dual nationality, he stated that "it is part" of him and it is "super natural": "It is more complex for those who see it from the outside, because of the whole issue of rivalry and competition in football, but it doesn't make me any noise". While being in a relationship with Elena Alcorta, in 2010, their son, named Santino Brancciari, was born. Because of this, Brancciari decided to quit smoking. He married Alcorta in 2011 and they eventually separated years later.

== Activism ==
In an interview by Claudio Kleiman in April 2009, on the cover of Rolling Stone in a special edition for the Río de la Plata population, Brancciari noted: "In this country, violence against women and death due to it reach numbers that are not you could believe", when femicides were not on the public agenda. With No Te Va Gustar, they recorded a song titled "Ilegal", included in the album Todo es tan Inflamable (2006), in favor of the legalization of abortion. Years later, around International Women's Day 2021, he released, with the band, the feminist song and the "female empowerment anthem" titled "Venganza", in collaboration with the Argentine singer Nicki Nicole, included on the band's tenth studio album Luz (2021).

At the 2023 Argentine general election, Brancciari's native country, encouraged people to vote and celebrated democracy, while signaling his support for the candidate Sergio Massa. After his dissatisfaction with the victory of Javier Milei, he commented that "they voted what they voted", and said that it "saddens" him, but hopes "it is the better for the country."

== Discography ==
- Cada Segundo Dura una Eternidad (2022)

== Awards and nominations ==
Association	Year	Category	Work/For	Result	Ref.
Graffiti Awards	2003	Best Composer	Himself	Won	
Graffiti Awards	2005	Best Composer	Himself	Nominated	
Graffiti Awards	2009	Best Composer	Himself	Nominated	
Graffiti Awards	2011	Best Composer	Himself	Won	
