= Hugo Fattoruso =

Uruguayan musician (born 1943)

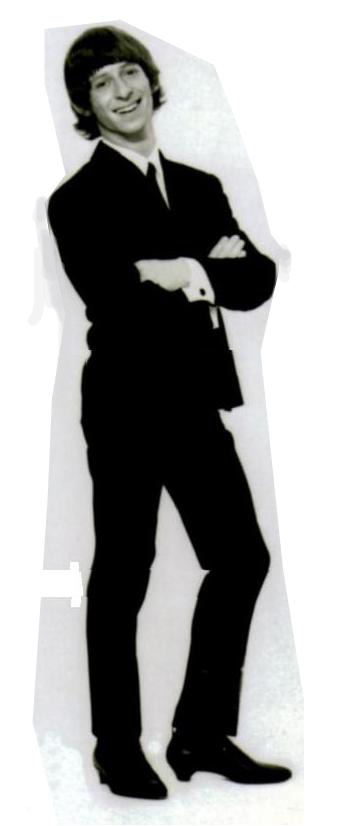
- Hugo Fattoruso in 1965

Background information
- Born: Hugo Fattoruso Dorci; 29 June 1943 (age 83); Montevideo, Uruguay
- Genres: Jazz; jazz fusion; candombe
- Occupations: Musician; bandleader; composer
- Instruments: Accordion; piano; double bass
- Years active: 1952–present

Hugo Fattoruso Dorci (born 29 June 1943) is an Uruguayan musician, composer, arranger and multi-instrumentalist. He is considered a significant figure in contemporary Latin American music, with a career encompassing rock, jazz, candombe, funk and fusion since the 1950s.

Fattoruso first became known as a member of Los Shakers, a 1960s Uruguayan rock band noted for its Beatle-influenced sound. The group gained widespread popularity in South America. While their first two albums drew heavily on the Beatles' musical style, their third and final album, La Conferencia Secreta del Toto’s Bar (1968), incorporated elements of tango, candombe and bossa nova, and is regarded as an important contribution to the development of Latin rock.

In the early 1970s Fattoruso moved to the United States, where he co-founded the jazz-fusion ensemble Opa with his brother Osvaldo Fattoruso originally as the backing group for Airto Moreira. The group blended electric jazz with Afro-Uruguayan candombe, Brazilian music and funk, and later achieved a cult following within the Latin jazz-rock scene.

Throughout his career Fattoruso has collaborated with artists such as Milton Nascimento, Airto Moreira, Flora Purim, Hermeto Pascoal, Djavan, Jaime Roos and Ruben Rada. His solo work spans a wide range of genres, and he has led or participated in numerous projects, including Trio Fattoruso, Barrio Opa and Rey Tambor, often focusing on the fusion of candombe and jazz.

Fattoruso has received several awards for his work, including a Latin Grammy Award for Musical Excellence. He continues to perform and record, and remains an influential figure in Uruguay's musical culture as well as in international jazz and world music.

== Career ==
- 1952–1958: Trío Fattoruso
- 1959–1963: The Hot Blowers.
- 1964–1969: Los Shakers
- 1969–1981: Opa
- 2000–present: Trío Fattoruso
- 2003–present: Hugo Fattoruso and Rey Tambor
- 2004–present: Solo artist
- 2007: With Yahiro Tomohiro created "Dos Orientales"

== Discography ==
=== With Los Shakers ===
- Los Shakers (1965)
- Shakers for You (1966)
- La conferencia secreta del Toto's Bar (1968)
- Bonus Tracks (2005)

=== With Hugo y Osvaldo ===
- La Bossa Nova de Hugo y Osvaldo (1969)

=== With Opa ===
- Goldenwings (1976)
- Magic Time (1977)
- Opa en vivo (1987)
- Back Home (1996)

=== With Otroshakers ===
- A Los Shakers (1981)

=== Solo albums ===
- Varios nombres (1986)
- Oriental (1990)
- Las aventuras de Fattoruso & Rada: En blanco y negro (with Ruben Rada) (1991)
- Momentos (with Jorge Graf) (1994)
- Homework (1997)
- O último blues (2002)
- Ciencia Fictiona (2004)
- Canciones (2009)
- Café y bar Ciencia Fictiona (2009)
- Ángeles (2009)
- Acorde on (2011)
- Canciones sin fin (2013)
- Hugo Fattoruso y Barrio Opa (2018)
- Recorriendo Uruguay (2021)
- Maquetas y Borradores (2021)

=== With Trío Fattoruso ===
- Trío Fattoruso (2001)
- En vivo en Medio y Medio (2005)
- Brainstorming (2020)
- Global Warming (2021)

=== With Dos Orientales (Tomohiro Yahiro) ===
- Dos Orientales (2008)
- Orienta (2011)
- Tercer viaje (2016)

=== With Fatto-Maza-Fatto ===
- Tango del Este (2011)

=== With Cuarteto Oriental ===
- Cuarteto Oriental (2012)
- Sin corbata (2017)

=== With Ha Dúo (Albana Barrocas) ===
- Neo (2013)
- Canciones y aéreos (2015)
- 2020 (2020)
- Nuevo Ha Duo (2021)
- Puente (2023)

=== With Barrio Sur ===
- Barrio Sur (2016)

=== With Trío Oriental ===
- Trío Oriental (2019)

== Filmography ==
- El chevrolé (1999)
- Sueños y pesadillas (2011)
- Dos orientales (2015)

== Awards and recognition ==
- 2026: Order of the Rising Sun, bestowed by the Japanese emperor Naruhito.
- 2023: Golden Morosoli Award.
- 2019: Latin Grammy Lifetime Achievement Award.
- 2015: Konex Mercosur Award in the field of Popular Music.
- 2009: Distinguished Citizen of Montevideo, bestowed by Intendant Ricardo Ehrlich.
