= Tango-rock =

- Stylistic origins: Argentine rock; tango nuevo; progressive rock; jazz-rock; art rock; folk rock
- Cultural origins: 1960s–1970s, Buenos Aires, Argentina
- Typical instruments: Guitar; bass guitar; drums; bandoneón; keyboards; piano; vocals

Tango-rock is a fusion genre that developed within the Argentine rock scene of the late 1960s and early 1970s by incorporating influences from tango, the traditional musical style of Buenos Aires. Some of the musicians who consolidated the style, both as solo artists and in bands, include Litto Nebbia, Luis Alberto Spinetta, Moris, Charly García, Alejandro del Prado and Fito Páez.

== History ==
=== 1960s–1970s: Classical period ===
Although rock and roll musicians had been active in Argentina since the 1950s, historians of Argentine rock (locally known as rock nacional) generally trace the genre's origins to the second half of the 1960s in Buenos Aires, when an emerging youth counterculture adopted it as a defining feature of their identity. Driven by the success of the 1967 single "La balsa" by Los Gatos—one of the genre's founding bands alongside Almendra and Manal—the nascent Argentine rock scene consolidated in the following years into a circuit of bands, record labels, specialized magazines and music festivals that sustained the phenomenon. The new youth music threatened tango's position as the predominant urban music of Buenos Aires, and the media fueled a supposed rivalry between young rockers and older tango musicians. However, musicians who pioneered rock nacional, such as Almendra's Luis Alberto Spinetta and Los Gatos' Litto Nebbia, have acknowledged tango as an influence.

Beginning in the 1950s, Ástor Piazzolla's stylistic renewal of tango transformed perceptions of the genre, which had been widely regarded as antiquated and static, and his innovations opened new pathways for experimentation that would prove influential to the burgeoning Argentine rock movement. Spinetta was a devoted admirer of Piazzolla and incorporated the bandoneon in the song "Laura va" from Almendra's eponymous debut album in early 1970. The lyrics of Javier Martínez, leader of Manal, have been described as tango-like for their reflections on working-class urban life in Buenos Aires. Martínez himself stated: "I recognize that my lyrics are tango-esque, but I don't change horses in midstream. I think it's great that other rock musicians sing tango, but I belong to another genre and you have to die in your own. However, I have some compositions, but I'm not going to sing them myself; I prefer someone who really knows how to do it to do so."

The song "Yo vivo en esta ciudad" by the Argentine folk-rock duo Pedro y Pablo (composed by Miguel Cantilo and Jorge Durietz), released in 1970, prominently features bandoneon counterpoints and has been considered a seminal recording in the fusion of tango and rock nacional. A few years earlier, the influential Uruguayan band Los Shakers—part of the so-called "Uruguayan Invasion" that was fundamental to Rio de la Plata beat music but without the Spanish lyrics that would characterize national rock—released the album La conferencia secreta del Toto's Bar (1968), whose song "Más largo que el ciruela" has been described as the first instance of fusion between tango and local rock. Other examples from later years, all from 1974, include "Mi querido amigo Pipo" by Moris, included on the album Ciudad de guitarras callejeras; "Tango en segunda" by Sui Generis, included on the album Pequeñas anécdotas sobre las instituciones; and "Apelación de otoño" by Litto Nebia featuring Rodolfo Mederos on bandoneon, included on the album Melopea.

In 1976, the year of the onset of the last civic-military dictatorship in Argentina, Spinetta's progressive rock band Invisible released the album El jardín de los presentes, considered one of the most emblematic works of tango-rock. Invisible incorporated tango elements, like the bandoneon, in tracks such as "Los libros de la buena memoria" or the opener "El anillo del Capitán Beto", which contains several references to porteño culture. Writing about the latter song, researcher Guillermo Anad wrote: "Beyond Gardel and tango itself, the lyrics of this Spinetta song, with their allusions to bitter mate, to 'my old lady and the coffee,' the solitude and the sad wandering shadow of this solitary Captain, are permeated by a strong tango air. It is significant that all this occurs in the lyrics of one of those who has most contributed to the literarization of rock songwriting in Argentina." According to band member Carlos Alberto "Machi" Rufino: "When we went on tour, we would sing tangos on the bus or in the car. One of them was 'El rosal' by Gerardo Matos Rodríguez and Manuel Romero, which Gardel sang. We'd do it a cappella and seriously—we really enjoyed doing that. Luis had put a bandoneon in 'Laura va', and my old man worshipped Gardel and even got to meet him; he played the violin. Luis's father sang tangos, and I myself watched all of Gardel's films and was a proud student of Sebastián Piana at the SADAIC music school. We always loved tango because of our urban environment and our family backgrounds."

=== 1980s–present: Subsequent fusions ===
In 1985, Fito Páez released the album Giros, considered one of the most important tango-rock albums. In 1990, Nacha Guevara released an atypical tango-rock album entitled Heavy Tango, which combined tango with glam metal and was widely panned by the press and the music scene.

== Bibliography ==
- Marchi, Sergio (2019). Spinetta. Ruido de magia (eBook) (in Spanish). Buenos Aires: Planeta. ISBN 978-950-49-6901-3.
- Spinetta, Luis Alberto; Berti, Eduardo (2014). Spinetta. Crónica e iluminaciones (eBook). Buenos Aires: Planeta. ISBN 978-950-49-4085-2.
