= Durazno sangrando =

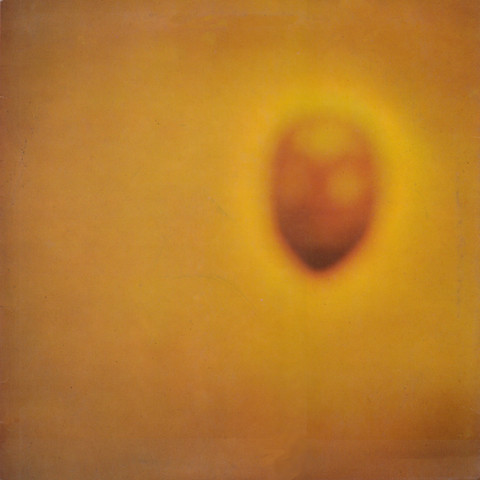

Studio album by Invisible
- Released: September 1975
- Recorded: CBS Studios, 1975
- Genre: Progressive rock; jazz rock; psychedelic rock
- Length: 37:18
- Label: CBS (Columbia/Sony Music)
- Producer: Luis Alberto Spinetta

Invisible chronology
Invisible (1974)	Durazno sangrando (1975)	El jardín de los presentes (1976)

Durazno sangrando (Spanish for "bleeding peach") is the second studio album by the Argentine rock band Invisible and the eighth featuring Luis Alberto Spinetta, released on September 1975. Invisible was composed of Spinetta (guitar and vocals), Pomo Lorenzo (drums), and Machi Rufino (bass).

It is a conceptual work inspired by notions Spinetta borrowed from the work of Swiss philosopher and psychologist Carl Jung, based on the traditional Chinese book The Secret of the Golden Flower. The album consists of only five tracks, including one of the most popular songs from Spinetta's songbook from which the album takes its title. This was the only song from the album performed at the mega-recital Spinetta y las Bandas Eternas organized by the musician in 2009 to celebrate his 40 years in music.

It was recorded in 1975 at CBS Studios and performed live (Teatro Coliseo, November 21 and 22, 1975).

The album cover, designed by Eduardo Martí, and the poster featuring a drawing by Spinetta himself were censored by the municipal authorities of the city of Rosario in late 1976, because they considered that the image (which according to its authors represented a peach pit) represented a vagina.

== The album ==
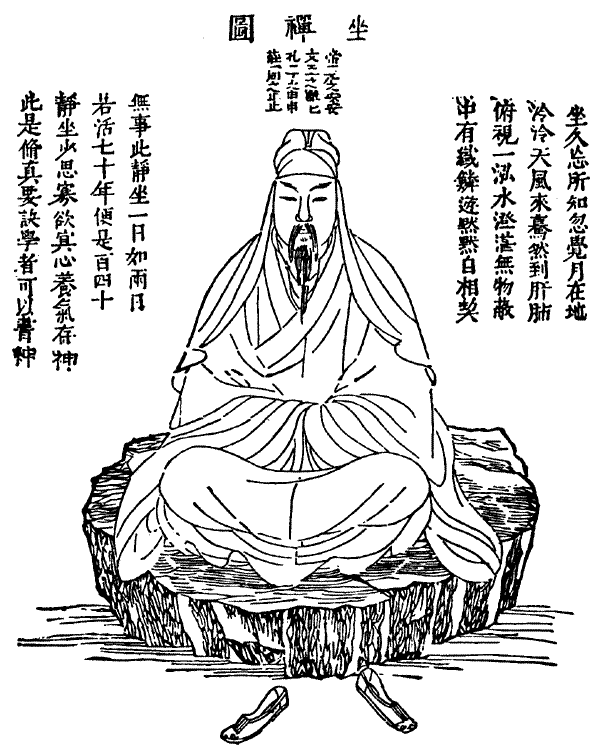
"Meditation: Collecting the Light", illustration from the Chinese book The Secret of the Golden Flower, about Taoist meditation, which inspired Spinetta to compose the album via his re-reading of the works of Carl Jung

Durazno sangrando is a conceptual work inspired by Spinetta's readings of the Swiss philosopher and psychologist Carl Jung on the traditional Chinese book The Secret of the Golden Flower, a Taoist meditation work attributed to Lü Dongbin (8th century), which was disseminated in the West thanks to its 1929 translation by the German Richard Wilhelm (Spinetta placed great importance on works that allowed him to escape Eurocentrism), and which inspired Jung's concepts of the animus and the anima. The lyrics of the songs display a strong surrealist air (as in much of the musician's work) with "nods to the philosopher Jean-Paul Sartre".

At the beginning of 1976, Spinetta would dedicate one of his concerts to the "marginalized and alienated of the world", a reality and social condition that was a constant in his work:

We dedicate this concert to all the marginalized and alienated of the world, because it is increasingly clear that, in the future, they will be the ones who will rule the human race.

— Luis Alberto Spinetta, Canal 11, 2 January 1975

== Themes ==
Continuing musically with the style that characterized the first two albums of Invisible linked to progressive rock and psychedelia, and with lyrics with a marked surrealist imprint (something that characterized, with exceptions, most of Spinetta's poetry), Durazno sangriento is a concept album based on Luis's readings, especially of The Secret of the Golden Flower as reflected in the title track (a ballad of comparative simplicity that would become one of the classics of the artist's repertoire) in which the stone, upon coming into contact with water, generates the "golden flower". The lyrics of "En una lejana playa del animus" ("On a distant shore [or beach] of the animus") and the 15 minute suite "Encadenado al ánima" ("Chained to the anima") refer respectively to the famous Jungian concepts of the anima and animus, where the first represents death and the second, life (both terms in turn are related to the Spanish word for "soul": "alma" or "anima")

The album also shows influences of the French philosopher Jean-Paul Sartre, as for example in "Dios de la adolescencia" ("God of adolescence"), whose lyrics (in which the words "being and nothingness" ["el ser y la nada"] appear - the title of Sartre's seminal work) seem to explore notions dear to that author about the pursuit of freedom (in the inescapable search for "being in itself") in the dreamlike images of a teenager in frantic flight from the anguish before the abyss of "nothingness", or in certain vignettes of "Encadenado al ánima" ("Chained to the anima") that seem to recreate the disturbing atmosphere of psychological and existential alienation in many of that author's works (cf, Nausea , "The camera" in The Wall: "The faces that look out the window/want to crystallize in my thoughts like hallucinations/As if the furniture could talk to me without moving/producing incomprehensible noises behind my back" (Spanish: "Las caras que asoman a la ventana/quieren cristalizarse en mi pensamiento en forma alucinatoria/Como si los muebles pudieran hablarme de ellas sin moverse/produciendo ruidos incomprensibles a mi espalda")). An important detail is that this surrealist poem is the work of Santiago Spinetta, Luis Alberto's father. There are myths that claim that Spinetta composed some songs on this album in Capilla del Monte based on regional legends.

== Track list ==
A side
No.	Title	Length
1.	"Encadenado al ánima" (Chained to the Anima)	15:32
2.	"Durazno sangrando" (Bleeding Peach)	3:46
Total length:		19:18

B side
No.	Title	Length
3.	"Pleamar de águilas" (High Tide of Eagles)	4:22
4.	"En una lejana playa del animus" (On a Distant Beach of the Animus)	9:57
5.	"Dios de la adolescencia" (God of Adolescence)	2:45
Total length:		18:00

== Credits ==
- Carlos Alberto 'Machi' Rufino – bass and vocals
- Héctor 'Pomo' Lorenzo – drums
- Luis Alberto Spinetta – guitars and vocals
- Esteban Martínez Prieto – ARP Strings Ensemble on "Encadenado al ánima"
- Luis Santiago Spinetta – lyrics for "Encadenado al ánima"

== See also ==
- Argentinian rock
- Latin rock
- Spinetta Jade
- Pescado Rabioso
- Almendra

== Bibliography ==
- Berti, Eduardo (1988). Spinetta: crónica e iluminaciones. Buenos Aires: Editora AC.
