= Almendra =

Almendra may refer to:

== Places ==
- Almendra, Salamanca, a village and municipality in the province of Salamanca, Spain
- Almendra, Portugal, a civil parish in the municipality of Vila Nova de Foz Côa, Portugal
- Almendra, Zamora, a village in the municipality of San Pedro de la Nave-Almendra, Spain
- Almendra Central, city centre of Madrid, Spain

== Music ==
- Almendra (band), a rock band from Buenos Aires, Argentina
- Almendra (Almendra album), 1969
- Almendra (Aldemaro Romero album), 1957
