= El jardín de los presentes =

Studio album by Invisible
- Released: 29 September 1976
- Studio: CBS Studios, Buenos Aires
- Genre: Progressive rock; tango-rock; art rock; jazz rock
- Length: 37:42
- Label: CBS
- Producer: Luis Alberto Spinetta

Invisible chronology
Durazno sangrando (1975)	El jardín de los presentes (1976)	Obras cumbres (2001)

El jardín de los presentes (pronounced [el xaɾˈðin de los pɾeˈsentes]); Spanish for "the garden of the present ones" or "the garden of presents") is the third and final album by the Argentine rock band Invisible, released on 29 September 1976 on CBS Records. The recording sessions and release of the album took place during a grim moment in Argentine history: a coup d'état in March 1976 installed a military dictatorship known as the National Reorganization Process in the country, inaugurating an era of state terrorism.

Invisible, which would disband in 1977, was one of the bands headed by musician Luis Alberto Spinetta. El jardín de los presentes marked a stylistic change in the band's sound, incorporating elements of jazz and tango. This shift is associated with the musical trends in Buenos Aires at that time, with musicians such as Astor Piazzolla, Dino Saluzzi, Jorge Pinchevsky and Daniel Binelli expanding the notions of the genre in their compositions, and rock musicians like Sui Generis and Litto Nebbia experimenting with tango-rock. The inclusion of the 18-year-old guitarist Tomás Gubitsch, trained in jazz music, was also vital in this artistic progression; however, it created tensions in the group, causing their eventual separation. The album also features bandoneonists Rodolfo Mederos and Juan José Mosalini, and composer Gustavo Moretto.

The album was presented with two multitudinous concerts at the Estadio Luna Park in August and September 1976, with an amount of attendants unusual at that time, indicating a peak in commercial success for the band El jardín de los presentes is considered one of the highest creative apexes in Spinetta's career. In 2007, the Argentine edition of Rolling Stone ranked it 28 on its list of "The 100 Greatest Albums of National Rock".

The song "Ruido de magia" is prominently sampled in "Dis Generation" by A Tribe Called Quest, off their final album We Got It from Here... Thank You 4 Your Service from 2016.

== Track listing ==
Side one
No.	Title	Length
1.	"El anillo del Capitán Beto"	5:08
2.	"Los libros de la buena memoria"	5:05
3.	"Alarma entre los ángeles"	6:32
4.	"Que ves el cielo"	2:04

Side two
No.	Title	Length
5.	"Ruido de magia"	4:35
6.	"Doscientos años"	4:08
7.	"Niño condenado"	7:08
8.	"Las golondrinas de Plaza de Mayo"	3:26
Total length:		37:42

Notes

- "Doscientos años" appears on the inner sleeve as "200 años"
- "Niño condenado" appears on the inner sleeve as "Perdonado"
- "Las golondrinas de Plaza de Mayo" appears on the inner sleeve as "Las golondrinas de Pza. de Mayo"

== Personnel ==
Credits adapted from the liner notes of El jardín de los presentes and AllMusic.

Invisible

- Tomas Gubitsch
- Hector "Pomo" Lorenzo
- Carlos Alberto "Machi" Rufino
- Luis Alberto Spinetta

Additional musicians

- Rodolfo Mederos – bandoneon
- Gustavo Moretto – ARP String Ensemble
- Juan José Mosalini – bandoneon

Production

- Horacio Cusato – A&R
- Roberto Labraga – mixing engineer
- Néstor Gilardón – engineer
- Oscar Giménez – engineer

Additional personnel

- Juan O. Gatti – artwork and gatefold photography
- Eduardo Martí – cover art photography
- Jorge Gubitsch – model

== See also ==
- 1976 in music
