= En Vivo (Selección Nacional de Tango album) =

Live album by Selección Nacional de Tango
- Released: September 18, 2007
- Recorded: 2005
- Genre: Tango
- Label: Típica Producciones

Professional ratings
Review scores
Source	Rating
Discográficas de Buenos Aires	(?)
Clarin.com	(?)

En Vivo is a live recording made on the 26 and 27 August 2005 in ND Ateneo, Buenos Aires, Argentina by the Selección Nacional de Tango a reunion of some of the best-known tango performers in the country with the musicians alternating between the roles of performer and arranger, which is unusual in tango. The album won the Premios Gardel for best tango album in 2007.

== Track listing ==
No.	Title	Length
1.	"Chique (arr. Baffa, comp. Brignolo)"	3:37
2.	"B.B (arr. Baffa, comp. Baffa-Berlingeri)"	3:07
3.	"Tierrita (arr. Ledesma, comp. Agustín Bardi)"	4:47
4.	"Sueño de Tango (arr. Ledesma, comp. Federico-Ledesma)"	4:47
5.	"Tarde de Julio (arr. and comp. Rios)"	4:30
6.	"Adiós Nonino (arr. Rios, comp. Astor Piazzolla)"	7:23
7.	"Diciembre en Buenos Aires (arr. and comp. Marcelli)"	3:07
8.	"Gallo Ciego (arr. Marcelli, comp. Bardi)"	3:07
9.	"La Alegría de Encontrarte (arr. and comp. Mederos)"	3:53
10.	"Abran cancha (arr. and comp. Mederos)"	3:27
11.	"El Abrojito (arr. Federico, comp. Berstein)"	3:02
12.	"Bahía Blanca (arr. Federico, comp. Carlos di Sarli)"	3:17
13.	"Selección de Temas Populares"	5:29
14.	"La Cumparsita"	5:17

== Personnel ==
The arrangements were by violinist Mauricio Marcelli, Ernesto Baffa, bandoneon players Leopoldo Federico, Rodolfo Mederos and Walter Ríos and pianist Nicolas Ledesma all of whom played on the album along with violinists Damián Bolotín, Eduardo Walczak, Mario Abramovich and Pablo Agri, viola player Mario Fiocca, cellist Diego Sánchez, bandoneonists Pablo Mainetti and Horacio Romo and bassist Horacio Cabarcos.
