= Heavy Tango =

Studio album by Nacha Guevara
- Released: 1991
- Recorded: April–August 1991
- Studio: Panda Studios, Buenos Aires
- Genre: Tango rock; tango fusion
- Length: 44:10
- Language: Spanish
- Label: BMG; RCA
- Producer: Nacha Guevara; Mike Ron Sini; Anel Paz

Nacha Guevara chronology
Nacha Guevara en concierto (1988)	Heavy Tango (1991)	La vida en tiempo de tango (1990)

Singles from Heavy Tango
- 1. "Yira yira" Released: 1991; 2. "Se dice de mí" Released: 1991

Audio sample
- Sample of lead single "Yira yira", a version of a standard by Enrique Santos Discépolo, showcasing the album's combination of tango with glam metal music.: file; help

Heavy Tango is a studio album by Argentine singer and actress Nacha Guevara, released in 1991 by BMG and RCA Records. Recorded between April and August 1991 in Buenos Aires, it is her only musical work published during the 1990s. As its title indicates, the album tries to be a fusion of tango with heavy metal, inspired by glam metal band Bon Jovi's work of the late 1980s. Guevara co-produced and led the project with her partner at the time, Miguel Ronsini (under his stage name Mike Ron Sini), a relationship that scandalized the public opinion of the time, as she was much older than him. The album features Tita Merello on her last recording appearance, a hip hop version of the famous tango "Se dice de mí". During this era, the singer adopted a look very reminiscent of Cher's. The Heavy Tango Tour toured the Argentine cities of Buenos Aires, Córdoba and Rosario. In addition to Argentina, Guevara performed in Málaga, at the Gran Teatro of Huelva, and at the Seville Expo '92. While in Spain, the singer also made several appearances on Jesús Quintero's television program.

The album was universally panned by the press, and is considered Guevara's most questioned work. She was accused of "ruining tango and rock simultaneously", and the album was described as a "grotesque recklessness", a "strange monstrosity of genres", and a display of bad taste. In a 2003 interview, singer Raúl Lavié said: "Was [Heavy Tango] another assassination attempt on the tango? She totally killed it." Even so, some people have somewhat recognized Heavy Tango as a pioneering work of "tango fusion", years before electronic tango appeared. In a 2018 interview, Guevara said of the album: "Everyone did it later! The most reactionary in terms of reception were the rock fans, not the tango fans."

== Track listing ==
No.	Title	Writer(s)	Length
1.	"Uno"	Enrique Santos Discépolo; Mariano Mores	4:55
2.	"Yira yira"	Discépolo	4:22
3.	"La última cruda"	Cátulo Castillo; Aníbal Troilo	4:27
4.	"Malevaje"	Discépolo; Juan de Dios Filiberto	4:22
5.	"Cambalache"	Discépolo	3:05
6.	"Desencuentro"	Castillo; Troilo	4:05
7.	"Mi Bs. As. querido"	Alfredo Le Pera; Carlos Gardel	4:09
8.	"Se dice de mí" (with Tita Merello)	Ivo Pelay; Francisco Canaro	3:34
9.	"Los mareados"	Enrique Cadícamo; Juan Carlos Cobián	6:06
10.	"El choclo"	Discépolo; Ángel Villoldo	3:59
11.	"Che bandoneón"	Homero Manzi; Troilo	1:10
Total length:			44:10

== Personnel ==
Credits adapted from Heavy Tango's liner notes.

- Nacha Guevara – production, idea and art design
- Mike Ron Sini – arrangements, musical direction, production, idea and art design
- Anel Paz – arrangements, musical direction, production and MIDI programming
- Mario Breuer – sound engineer
- Guido Nissenson – assistant engineer
- Luciano Rodofili – executive producer
- Maximiliano Gilbert – production assistant
- Lino Patalano – general production
- Bernie Grundman – mastering
- Pablo Aguilar – mastering supervision
- Guillermo Monteleone – photography
- José Luis Servioli – art direction
- Claudio Aboy – illustrator

== See also ==
- 1991 in music
- History of the tango
- List of music considered the worst
