= Mario Abramovich =

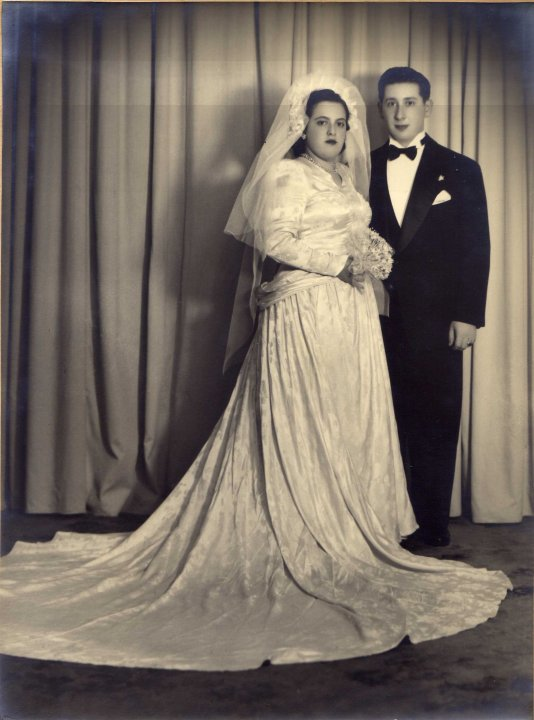
- Abramovich (right), with wife

Background information
- Born: Mario Abramovich; 31 October 1926; Argentina
- Died: 1 December 2014 (aged 88) Buenos Aires, Argentina
- Genres: Tango
- Occupations: Violinist; composer
- Instrument: Violin
- Formerly of: Sexteto Mayor

Mario Abramovich (31 October 1926 – 1 December 2014) was an Argentine violinist and composer, considered an important figure linked to the music of tango.

He acted from a young violinist, integrating prestigious ensembles dedicated to the genre and has composed pieces.

He was a member of the group Sexteto Mayor since its founding in 1973, until his death in 2014.

== Career ==
When Abramovich was six years old, he studied violin performance with Martin Llorca and later won a contest and became a violinist in the Teatro Colón. In 1943 he began his relationship with the tango. Worked as first violin with Osvaldo Fresedo, Miguel Caló and Argentino Galván, he joined the orchestra for 23 years of Héctor Varela and made recordings with Juan d'Arienzo and Aníbal Troilo.

In 1987, Abramovich performed on Bryan Ferry's solo album Bête Noire. He appeared on the Selección Nacional de Tango album En Vivo in 2005.
