= Almendra (Almendra album) =

Studio album by Almendra
- Released: January 15, 1970
- Recorded: April–September 1969
- Studios: TNT Studios, Buenos Aires
- Genres: Argentine rock; progressive rock; psychedelic rock; psychedelic pop; art rock; jazz rock
- Length: 37:35
- Language: Spanish
- Label: Vik (RCA Victor)
- Producer: Almendra

Almendra chronology
Almendra (1970)	Almendra II (1970)

Singles from Almendra
- 1. "Muchacha (Ojos de Papel) / Ana No Duerme" Released: January 20, 1970

Almendra (pronounced [alˈmendɾa]; Spanish for "almond") is the self-titled debut studio album by Argentine rock band Almendra which was released in early 1970 on Vik, a subsidiary of RCA Victor. To distinguish it from the band's next release, Almendra II, it is also known as Almendra I. The album represented the first full-length musical endeavour of nineteen-year-old Luis Alberto Spinetta, having formed the band in the mid 1960s along with Emilio del Guercio, Edelmiro Molinari and Rodolfo García. The famous artwork, showing a crying man with a toy arrow stuck on his head, was designed by Spinetta to embody the different lyrical themes of the album.

By the late 1960s, the nueva ola phenomenon was losing popularity and Los Gatos' debut single, "La balsa", had catapulted the emergence of Argentine rock. The success of Los Gatos paved the way for Manal and Almendra; the three groups are considered the foundational trilogy of Argentine rock, singing serious and artistic songs in Spanish at a time when this was discouraged. Spinetta's lyricism has been celebrated for its poetry, surrealism and idiosyncratic use of grammar and accent. Almendra incorporated musical influences from the Beatles, jazz, and Argentine music such as tango and folk music.

Upon release, the album achieved critical and commercial success, aided by the popularity of the single "Muchacha (ojos de papel)", which remains one of Spinetta's most celebrated compositions. Almendra is often listed as one of the greatest and most influential albums in the history of Argentine rock music, serving as a foundation of what is locally known as rock nacional and, by extension, rock en español in general. The album remains a paradigm of Argentine 1960s youth culture, signaling the growing influence of the counterculture of that decade in the country.

== Background and development ==
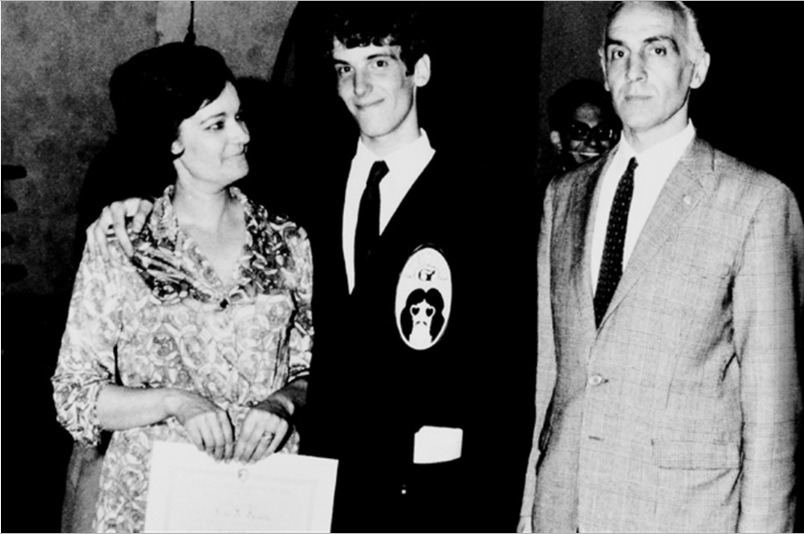
Spinetta with his parents Julia and Luis Santiago, graduating from high school in 1968.

Almendra was formed in the barrio of Núñez in Buenos Aires. Luis Alberto Spinetta and Emilio del Guercio became friends while attending the San Román high school in Belgrano. They published a magazine, La costra degenerada, with their own articles and drawings and shared common interests and points of view about music, sex, power and religion. Spinetta was a fan of the Beatles, but del Guercio was more interested in folk music. They were inspired by surrealism and the psychedelic experience, although they had not used drugs at that point. Edelmiro Molinari and del Guercio were in a band called Los Sbirros – making cover versions of the Beatles, the Rolling Stones, the Shadows and Los Teen Tops – along with Ángel del Guercio, Ricardo Miró, Santiago "Chago" Novoa and Eduardo Miró (later replaced by del Guercio). Spinetta had joined Los Larkins, where Rodolfo García was the drummer. Spinetta and García then joined Los Masters, a band led by Guido Meda; the group had a succession of names, including Los Beadniks, Los Beatniks and Los Mods. The groups merged, although Meda disliked the idea and stepped aside. Almendra was ready to start playing, but García had to serve in the military and they waited a year until he returned. At this embryonic stage Spinetta had composed "Plegaria para un niño dormido" and "Zamba", a song he would record in 1982 as "Barro tal vez". During the second half of the 1960s, Argentina and the world were experiencing political, social and cultural changes. The Argentine Revolution overthrew the government of Arturo Umberto Illia in June 1966, establishing Juan Carlos Onganía as a military dictator. Leonid Brezhnev was appointed General Secretary of the USSR, LSD advocate Timothy Leary was sentenced to 30 years in prison and the Vietnam War escalated. The Beatles released Revolver and Sgt. Pepper's Lonely Hearts Club Band, influential examples of the emerging countercultural genre of psychedelic music. Tango opera María de Buenos Aires by Ástor Piazzolla and Horacio Ferrer premiered, the literary Latin American Boom (including Pablo Neruda and Julio Cortázar) flourished, Mercedes Sosa made bold political statements as a preeminent exponent of nueva canción and the French New Wave was rewriting the language of cinema. The group absorbed these local and international cultural influences. Spinetta became interested in Friedrich Nietzsche, particularly Thus Spoke Zarathustra (which inspired the Almendra song, "Hermano perro"). Lalo Schifrin, Thelonious Monk, Tom Jobim, the Rolling Stones and Les Double Six were also cited as influences.

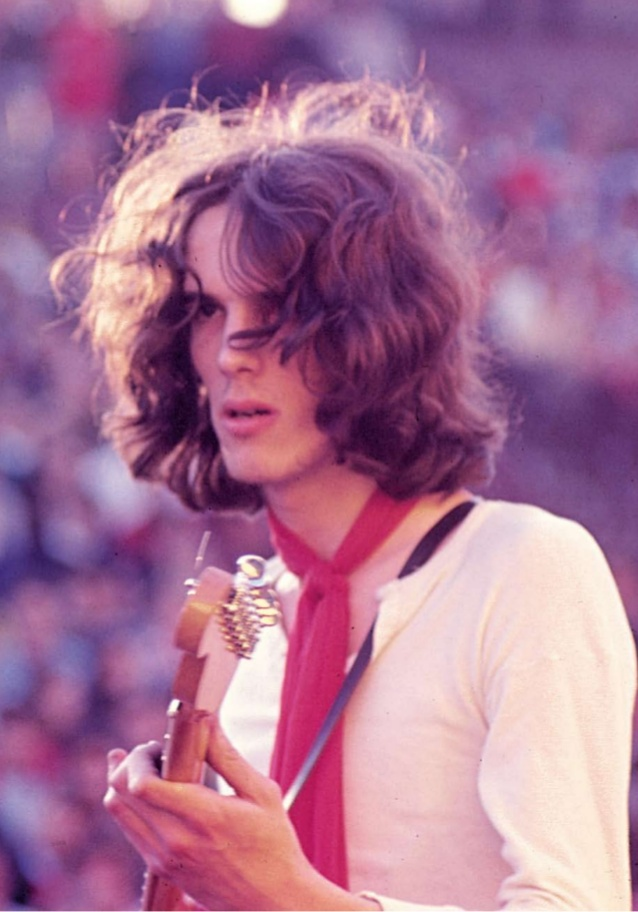
A nineteen-year-old Spinetta performing with Almendra at the Festival Pinap, 1969.

In 1967, Los Gatos released their first single, "La balsa", backed with "Ayer nomás". The song catapulted the burgeoning "rock nacional" scene in Buenos Aires, establishing the commercial viability of rock music sung in Spanish, and turning what originally was an underground scene into a widespread youth culture phenomenon. "La balsa" sold over 250,000 copies, an impressive number for that time, especially for a song with Spanish lyrics that differed from the cheerful and shallow efforts of the contemporary nueva ola movement. Spinetta told Juan Carlos Diez in 2006: "It was a very good thing because it was the example that [rock in Spanish] could be done. I believe that "La balsa" was a great inspiration for everyone. And also other tracks of Los Gatos. Each track contained a mystery that, at the same time, was a poetic motivation, a great incentive for us." After a Los Gatos concert, Spinetta met producer Ricardo Kleiman and invited him to the band's rehearsals. When Kleiman heard the band play he signed them to RCA Victor, and in November 1968 Almendra released their first single: "Tema de Pototo", backed with "El mundo entre las manos". Almendra began playing live, with performances during the summer of 1969 in Mar del Plata and an appearance at the Ancón Festival in Peru. Their Buenos Aires debut was at the Di Tella Institute as part of Three Beat Shows, where they introduced "Fermín", "Ana no duerme" and "Que el viento borró tus manos", songs which would appear on their first studio album. Almendra released a second single, "Hoy todo el hielo en la ciudad" backed with "Campos verdes"; it was also released in Peru, where it was more successful than it was in Argentina. Between April and September 1969, the band recorded their first LP at TNT Studios, Buenos Aires, while a third single ("Tema de Pototo", backed with "Final") was released. At the time of Almendra's release, the influence of the Beatles and the Rolling Stones had overshadowed the success of the nueva ola, exemplified by the popular teen pop music TV show, El Club del Clan.

== Composition ==
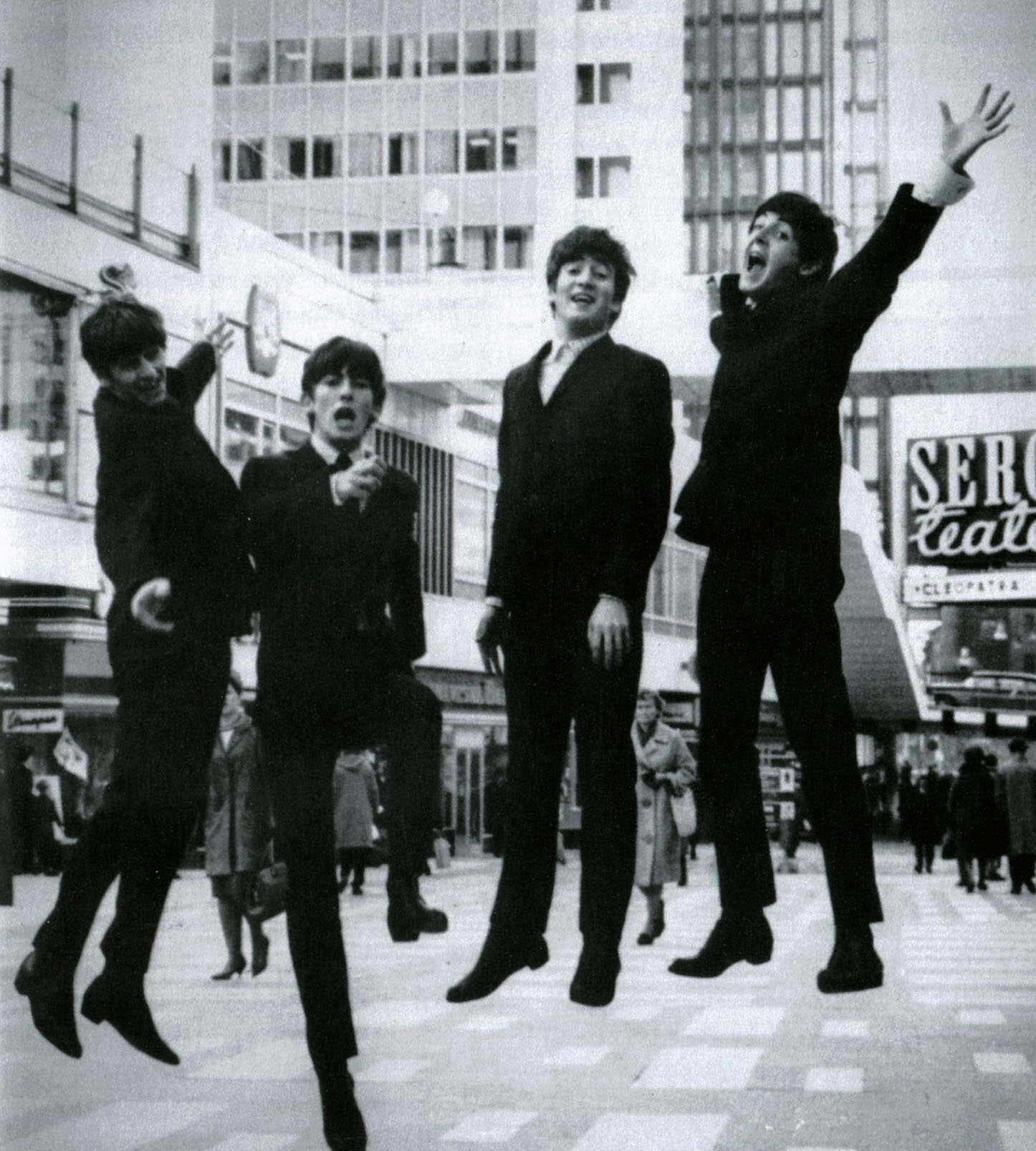
One of Almendra's chief influences was the Beatles, so much so that they were called the "Argentine Beatles", also due to their influence on the country's popular music.

Almendra, considered one of Argentina's first rock albums, is characterized by stylistic diversity; it fuses elements of contemporary pop music, jazz, tango and Argentine folk music. A major influence was the Beatles, particularly their 1967 album Sgt. Pepper's Lonely Hearts Club Band. For instance, in "Muchacha (ojos de papel)", lyrics such as "ojos de papel" ("paper eyes") and "pechos de miel" ("honey breasts") are reminiscent of those in "Lucy in the Sky with Diamonds" ("newspaper taxis" and "marmalade skies"), and "Laura va" was inspired by "She's Leaving Home". Tango influences may be heard in "Plegaria para un niño dormido" and "A estos hombres tristes". Andrés Torrón of Uruguayan newspaper El Observador noted a similarity between Almendra and Pink Floyd's 1967 album, The Piper at the Gates of Dawn; feeling that "although reminiscences of Syd Barrett can be found in the melodies and prose of the Spinetta of those years, there were already a number of personal traits that would make him one of the most influential rock musicians on this side of the world." Music journalist Diego Fischerman described the album as a "heterogeneous world, where, like the Beatles, each song was a surprise and where the best traditions of rock (pursuit, nonconformity, curiosity, eagerness to conquer new musical territories) came together with a Buenos Aires of conflicting cosmopolitanism." According to Carlos Polimeni of newspaper Página/12, "In Almendra's first record are the Beatles, Cortázar, the French May, free jazz, the experimentation of the Di Tella, the avant-garde tango, the folklore of projection, the French Nouvelle Vague, Borges, and the new trends in national plastic arts, among other influences, but none markedly mentioned or honored axiomatically."

Spinetta's lyrics have been widely studied for their lyricism, poetic quality, precise use of language, and rich visual imagery; as well as the innovation of singing them in Spanish. They are characterized by an abundance of metaphors and a surrealism deeply influenced by songs such as "Lucy in the Sky with Diamonds" and "Strawberry Fields Forever". Writing for Noisey in 2016, Eduardo Santos argued that "although it does not have any song with protest lyrics or hymns against the establishment, Almendra is an album very influenced by the hippie culture with its ideals of peace, coexistence and love." He also felt that the lyrics "[frolic] between poetry and the experiences of the group members."

"Muchacha (ojos de papel)"
One of Spinetta's most enduringly popular compositions, the album opener characterizes a girl using ambiguous adjectives and metaphors. According to Germán Arrascaeta of La Voz del Interior, it "recycled the surrealism of André Breton in an effort to give the ruling beat music a twist."

The album opens with "Muchacha (ojos de papel)", one of the most celebrated songs in Argentine rock history. Spinetta dedicated the song to Cristina Bustamante, his girlfriend at the time, and has compared the romantic ballad to songs like "Tu nombre me sabe a hierba" by Joan Manuel Serrat and "Julia" by the Beatles. Musician Alejandro del Prado described its lyrics as "almost pornographic at the time", citing phrases such as "pechos de miel" and "quédate hasta el alba" ("stay until dawn"). The length of the nine-plus-minute "Color humano", written by Edelmiro Molinari, concerned the record label since it precluded radio play. The jazz-inspired jam session is composed of two relatively short vocal segments surrounding a five-minute guitar solo by Molinari. The ballad "Figuración" is characterized by its use of the recorder, played by Del Guercio. Rolling Stone Argentina considered that the track, "anticipates certain ways of Sui Generis although in the final chorus the deep voice of Pappo and other boys of the environment known as 'Circus' are noticed." The lyrics of "Figuración" have been described as metaphysical, with Spinetta urging the listener to disfigure themselves. In "Ana no duerme", a sleepless girl is restlessly waiting; its lyrics refer to the need of many teenage girls to repress their sexuality. Spinetta described the title character as "that being that is always waiting. That girl who hopes to be loved, who expects a little bit of friendship, of understanding, who wants to leave her vulgar world of womanhood, who wants to occupy another place. [...] At that time, a girl of 16 or 17 was not the woman she can be today." The strongly paced track, with a rhythmic shift representing the "interrupted dreams" of the title character, has been compared to Pink Floyd's "See Emily Play" and is considered "the most rocker moment" of the album. Although the "Ana" in the song was long thought to be Ana María Spinetta (Luis Alberto's sister), he denied it on more than one occasion. Film producer Ana Aizenberg claims to be the inspiration after an affair she had with Spinetta.

"A estos hombres tristes"
"In that [Buenos Aires of conflicting cosmopolitanism,] in which the police were engaged in cutting the hair of "hippies" and miniskirts were considered immoral, and where Piazzolla became massive [...], could appear a song like "A estos hombres tristes", with its resonances of the Swingle Singers and the Burt Bacharach of Butch Cassidy and the Sundance Kid, jazz readings à la Brubeck and [a] deep melancholy."
—Diego Fischerman, Página/12, 2009.

"Fermín" describes a mentally ill character in an institution. The song changes a line from the French folk song, "Marlbrough s'en va-t-en guerre", from "Mambrú se fue a la guerra, no sé cuándo vendrá" ("Mambrú left for the war; I do not know when he will return") to "Fermín se fue a la vida, no sé cuándo vendrá" ("Fermín left for life; I do not know when he will return"). According to Spinetta, "life for the insane is like war for the sane." Reflecting on the track, Spinetta said: "In front of my house lived an incredible character called Carlitos, a retarded boy, who is in part the personification of Fermín for me. With Carlitos we shared moments of joy when we were kids. Although he could not play ball with everyone, he felt accompanied in his tremendous problem when we were with him. It is also an apology, because I remember that his mother punished him a lot, even in front of the other boys. I do not know if the degree of illness of the song's Fermín is as actue as that of Carlitos, but serves to define the situation of the alienated as a propitious cell to receive the most aberrant injustices. "Plegaria para un niño dormido" urges not to wake a poor child up, letting him be happy in his dreams. The criticism of society's injustice is, in Spinetta's words, "a complaint made with tenderness." He called it "the symbol of a Christian ideology: neighborliness, solidarity." "A estos hombres tristes" has been described as "[outlining] a kind of compressed suite", with "airs of jam-session and urban song". It was inspired by the melancholy of Sundays in Argentina, with Spinetta saying: "Sunday was always a sad day, I do not know why. At the same time it was happy because there was football, the family gathered, there was good food. The importance that was given to the weekend in our country in those years was tremendous. But the personal solitude at that time was very clear." The album ends with "Laura va", a baroque pop song which took Spinetta a year and a half to write. An attempt to emulate the Beatles' "She's Leaving Home", it features an "evocative counterpoint" played with the bandoneón. Rolling Stone Argentina considered that Spinetta's vocals in the track "[timidly insinuate]" a crooner facet that he would further explore later in his career.

== Release and commercial reception ==
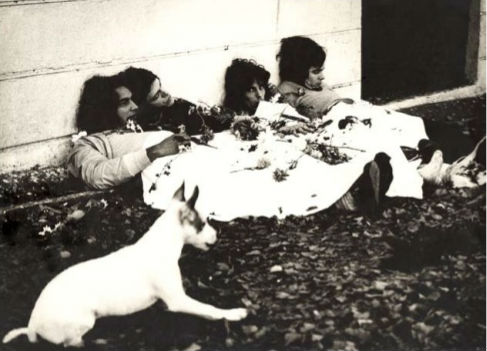
Almendra in a 1970 photo shoot.

Almendra was originally scheduled for release on November 29, 1969, to reach consumers during the December holiday season, but RCA Victor rejected Spinetta's cover art and postponed publication. When the band refused to modify the artwork, the label ultimately released the album on January 15, 1970, an unconventional choice for the Argentine music market of the time. Almendra was released through the label's subsidiary Vik. On the occasion of the album's release, the band created a small promotional flyer on a typewritten sheet of paper with the group's name in Letraset, which read: "Over the course of six months of intense work and total commitment to what is ours, we have come to understand that what at some point may transcend ceases to be exclusively the author's property and becomes something legitimately belonging to all of us. That is why January 15 is an important date for both us and you. It is the release of our first long-play album. It is our emergence toward you." The band produced a 35mm black-and-white promotional short film featuring "Campos verdes" and "El mundo entre las manos", which was shown in cinemas as part of the newsreel Sucesos Argentinos.

Almendra presented the album live on June 6, 1969 at the Teatro Coliseo, accompanied by Vox Dei, Leonardo Favio and Los Abuelos de la Nada. They made television appearances on Tropicana, Sábados circulares, Sótano beat, and "an unhappy appearance" on Bernardo Neustadt's show. Regarding the songs' concert presentation, particularly of "Muchacha (ojos de papel)", Spinetta stated in 1984: "... when we premiered ["Muchacha"] in Coliseo, the success of the song was so resounding that I cried myself, I could not believe it. [...] The emotion that I felt was tremendous. Indelible. I cried on stage, because I felt that all the people were shocked with that. Instantly. Success came later. I felt that the song pierced through the people, just as when I premiered "Plegaria" or "Figuración", "Muchacha" pierced through the people. With Almendra I repeatedly saw boys and girls crying, of emotion or of happiness." In early 1970, Spinetta published a series of drawings in the second number of the short-lived magazine Alquitrán, in which he illustrated each of the songs of Almendra.

Ricardo Alejandro Kleinman had signed Almendra with RCA Victor as part of his project of promoting new and "distinguished" music such as Led Zeppelin, Cream, The Who and Traffic, which he featured in his radio show Modart en la noche alternating with more commercial acts. Part of this project was the inclusion of Spanish-language music that acted as "an Argentine equivalent of the aesthetic searches of post-Revolver rock, which is what was consumed by young people with purchasing power, mostly university students, in Europe and the United States." However, Almendra found its audience outside of the demographic target that had been expected, becoming popular among the common porteño youth. Wide commercial success arrived when "Muchacha (ojos de papel)", was used in a television commercial for fabrics aimed at the youth. The song, with "Ana no duerme" as its B-side, was released as the album's only single on January 20, 1970. In 1996, Spinetta stated that he was unhappy with that advertisement, but did not have enough money to hire a lawyer at that time. On March 5, 1970 Gente stated that, 20 days since its release, the album had sold 10,000 copies. Cristina de Irala of the magazine reported on their successful presentation in the touristic city of Mar del Plata, writing: "At that hour of the early morning, in a city in full summer season, one became aware that the 'beat music' movement really is a phenomenon. Which one of our musical monsters could go on a stage and fill a room in those conditions?" The same year, journalist Margot de Kumec noted the "religious attention" and identification that the band generated among its young audience.

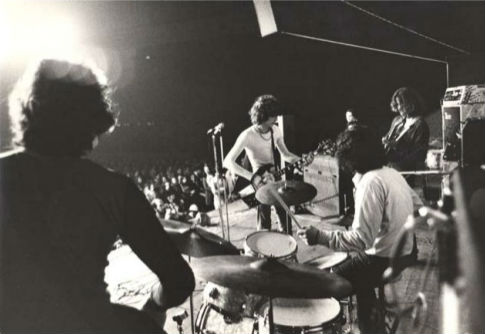
Almendra performing in 1970.

Tracks off Almendra appear in various compilation albums of the band released by RCA Records, including a self-titled one of 1972, Muchacha ojos de papel of 1980, Serie 20 éxitos of 1995, and Inolvidables – 20 grandes éxitos of 2003. In 1979, Almendra reunited and performed a series of concerts that attracted massive audiences, something that had been rarely seen in the country because of the so-called National Reorganization Process. A double live album recorded at Estadio Obras Sanitarias in December 1979 was self-released on May 3, 1980, featuring several renditions of songs from the band's 1969 studio debut. In 1992, BMG Argentina released the first CD reissue of the album. Titled Almendra (Cronología), its tracklist is organized in chronological order and subdivided into three sections. The first one, titled "The first singles", contains songs released before the album, which are "Tema de Pototo", "El mundo entre las manos", "Hoy todo el hielo en la ciudad", "Campos verdes", "Gabinetes espaciales" and "Final". The CD's middle section consists of the Almendra album, followed by some of the band's subsequent songs, under the title: "The singles that were and were not". It includes "Hermano perro", "Mestizo", "Toma el tren hacia el sur", "Jingle" and "Rutas argentinas". The album was included in the 1999 box set Almendra 68/70, released by BMG Argentina for subscribers of the Argentine edition of Rolling Stone. Sony BMG released the first European edition of the album in 2005, as a digipak CD. In 2015, Sony Music reissued fifteen classic albums of Argentine rock—including Almendra—in vinyl, respecting every detail of their original editions' packaging.

== Cover art ==
He was the character of the retarded Argentine. Playing the role of an idiot ... It's kind of pathetic. Of course, with the little plunger, he has not even been injured; a mediocrity Almendra attacks.

— Spinetta on the album cover, 2008.

The album cover, designed by Spinetta, shows a distressed man with his hair covered by a scarf and a tear running down his cheek; a toy arrow is stuck on his head, and he is wearing a pink shirt with the name of the band. Spinetta used tempera and pencils on mat paper. RCA considered the artwork incomprehensible and noncommercial, and shelved its first version. Spinetta said, "We were not going to allow the record to be released without it. I had the picture in my head very clearly, and I went home and did it again. We did not want to leave things in the hands of mediocre company dudes that make album covers like [sausages]." Emilio García said in 2008 that the label thought most record buyers were women, and artwork should depict men as handsomely as possible: "They could not believe it, because the cover of an LP (at the time) featured artists' faces or holding electric guitars; we came out with a cover like that, which I still consider absolutely great."

On the album's track listing, each song is identified with a symbol from the cover: a teardrop, an eye, or a toy arrow. The teardrop identifies "Muchacha (ojos de papel)", "Figuración", "Plegaria para un niño dormido" and "Que el viento borró tus manos", the most rock-oriented songs; the eye, "Color humano" and "A estos hombres tristes", the most melancholic songs; and the toy arrow "Ana no duerme", "Fermín" and "Laura va", songs with proper names. The inner sleeve describes each icon:

- Eye: Songs sung by the Man of the Cover while he is unconscious in the void
- Teardrop: Songs as bright as the thousand-year-old teardrop shed by the Man of the Cover
- Toy arrow: Songs sung to the tear shed by the Man of the Cover by men tied to their destinies

Emilio del Guercio said that the toy arrow represents absurdity and the teardrop sentimentality and melancholy. According to Argentine graphic artist Rep, the artwork conveys a grotesque, dramatic flavor and the feeling that the album should be taken seriously but not too seriously.

== Critical reception ==
Professional ratings
Review scores
Source	Rating
AllMusic	5/5 stars

According to Eduardo Berti, the album received generally positive reviews, with Rodolfo Alchourrón's orchestral arrangement of "Laura va" universally acclaimed. However, journalist Diego Fischerman of Página/12 disagreed, writing in 2009:

In 1968, what was later called rock was not in the newspapers. What's more, there was no criticism of popular music there. The pioneer, in that matter, was Jorge Andrés, in his articles for the magazine Análisis and, a little later, in the newspaper La Opinión. That is why when it is said, as in the brochure of the box that gathers all the production of Almendra, that "the critics approved them and the public adored them", it is a lie. The public was scarce and there was no criticism, if you discard what was published in [Pinap], which rather responded to modest press operations of the recording labels to impose that new product, the "beat music", which between 1968 and 1970 flooded the market.

The rock magazine Pelo stated that "this album may be the synthesis of a new music emerging. A La Prensa review described it as "a thin melancholy," and it "[faces] its manifestation with the seriousness and depth of who wants to give a testimony of their world, a concern usually oblivious to young authors and performers." The magazine Gente was enthusiastic: "Did you already listen to the first LP by the group Almendra? Do not waste time, fool, because I assure you it is the best album of the beat genre produced in our country." Also from Gente, Cristina de Irala wrote in early 1970 that Almendra was "an authentic demonstration of talent, music and beauty." Journalist Margot de Kumec wrote in 1970 that "they proclaim in their creations a deepening in the essence of men", and praised their "poetry, melody and rhythm". A Clarín review of the album was harsh: "The lyrics of each track do not have an equal level, with the aggravation of being poorly fused with musical metrics." Spinetta said that much of his resentment of the press was born at that time, when he "realized that large magazines like Gente or Siete Días fabricated articles. They put what they wanted." In a retrospective review for AllMusic, Iván Adaime gave the album a five-star rating, calling it a masterpiece and writing that it "is great from the beginning till the end" and "not only one of the first Argentinean rock albums, but one of its best."

== Legacy ==
We must remember: in just two years (1968–1970) and two very different albums (an LP and a double album) Almendra radically changed Argentine popular music. It was a mysterious ray that was integrated from the area of Bajo Belgrano to the bohemian gestures of the countercultural longhairs of the Plaza Francia-La Cueva-La Perla triangle. (Note: The porteño underground of the 1960s had its epicenter in the triangle formed by a precarious musical bar called La Cueva in Avenida Pueyrredón, the Torcuato di Tella Institute in Florida Street, and Plaza Francia. Besides originating rock nacional, this countercultural youth subculture made important advances in Modern art and are today considered the first hippies of the country (despite not using that name themselves).) [...] Almendra expressed through a musical project the potencies and tensions of their own time.

— Mariano Del Mazo, Página/12, 2017.

Almendra is considered one of the most important records in the history of Latin American rock. It has been voted the most important record in Argentine rock history on various occasions. A July 1985 survey by journalist Carlos Polimeni for Clarín ranked Almendra as by far the greatest album in the history of Argentine rock music; respondents included local musicians Charly García, Gustavo Cerati of Soda Stereo, Celeste Carballo, Miguel Mateos, Alejandro Lerner and Raúl Porchetto, among others. In 2007, the Argentine edition of Rolling Stone ranked it sixth on its list of "The 100 Greatest Albums of National Rock". In 2006, the Latin alternative music magazine Al Borde ranked Almendra 10th on its list of the 250 Best Albums of Ibero-American rock. Spanish online newspaper Diariocrítico.com included the album in its 2016 feature of "The 20 Best Records of Argentina", with journalist Sergio Ariza Lázaro describing it as a masterpiece. Chilean newspaper La Tercera ranked Almendra thirteenth in its 2017 list of "The 20 Best Albums of Argentine Rock".

"Muchacha (ojos de papel)" remains a symbol of the band and "an emblem of the social and individual conquests of the 1960s." It is now considered "the quintessential love song of rock nacional." The track was second on MTV and Rolling Stone Argentina's Top 100 Songs of Argentine Rock and Rock.com.ar's Top 100 Argentinean Songs of the Last 40 Years. Al Borde ranked the song 45th on its list of 500 Most Important Songs of Ibero-American Rock.

The album had a seminal influence on Argentine rock. During the 1960s, a generation of musicians from the La Cueva bar on Avenida Pueyrredón was trying to reflect an everyday reality absent from popular music since the tango era. Called "progressive music" by journalists, the movement was catapulted by the commercial success of Los Gatos, the house band of La Cueva. The recognition of Los Gatos in 1967 paved the way for Almendra and Manal, "progressive music" bands that divided the musical panorama by synthesizing two sides of Buenos Aires, one sophisticated and one more linked to the tango. Audiences created a rivalry around the two, inspired by the Beatles and Rolling Stones rivalry, identifying Almendra as the former and Manal as the latter. These three bands are considered the pillars of what is known in Argentina as rock nacional ("national rock"), and rock en español in general. Serious, artistic Spanish-language songs were unprecedented in the country. According to Rolling Stone, Almendra reached "one of the highest levels of quality, innovation and precocity" in Argentine music; "if not pioneers (because there is no Almendra without Los Gatos), they put into 3D a variety of sounds, accents and adjectives which are still the textbook of the new generation."

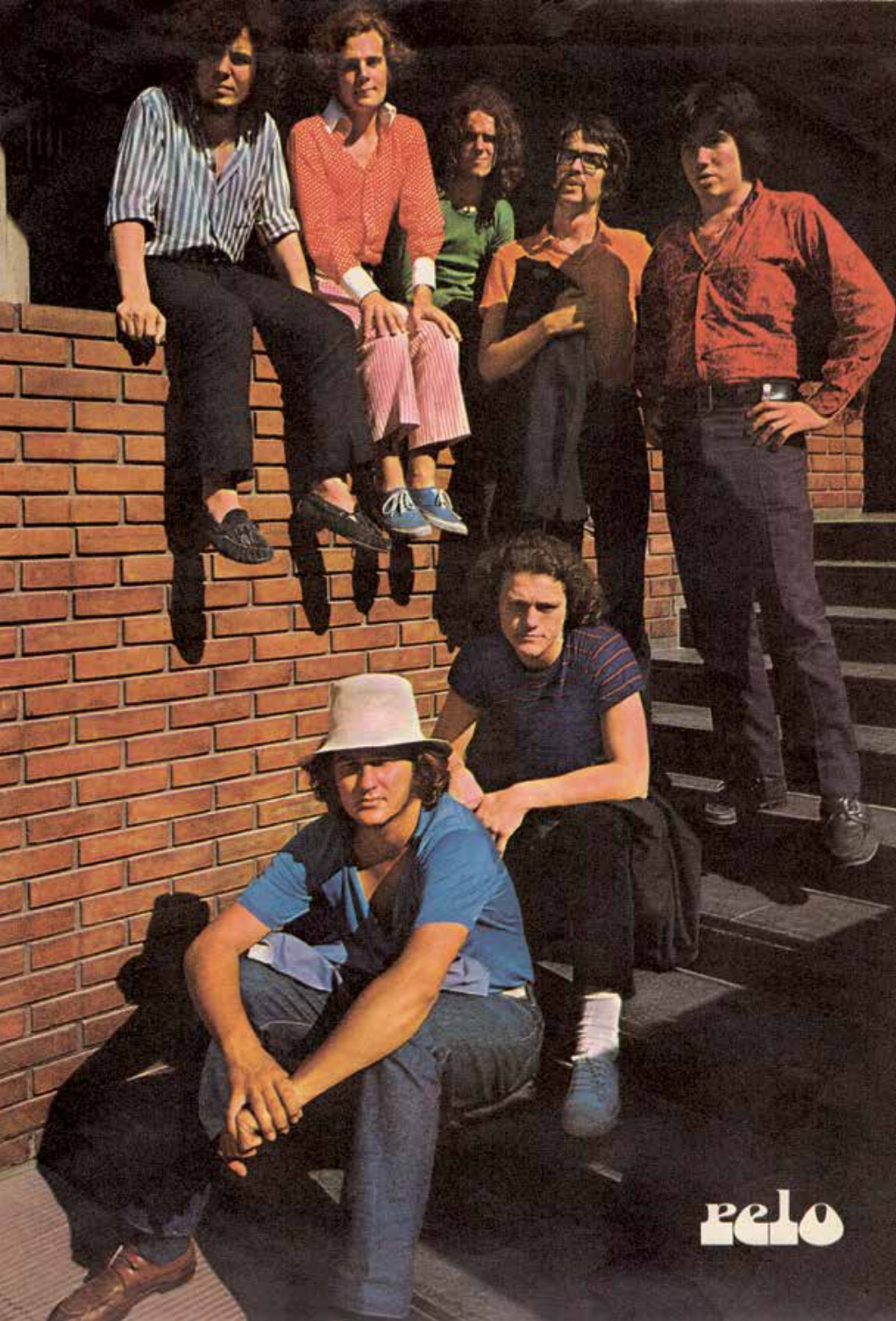
The members of Almendra and Manal in a 1970 poster for Pelo magazine.

While Los Gatos were mainly influenced by beat music, and Manal by the blues, Almendra made an impact with a uniqueness reflected in surreal lyrics and album art, as well as the lack of an article preceding their name (as did Manal). On this matter, Mariano Del Pozo of Página/12 wrote: "It is remarkable a third position that seems inherent in the essence of Almendra. Whether aesthetically—listening to [their] two albums, it is not wrong to locate the band between the beat of Los Gatos and the blues of Manal—as well as Del Guercio's sympathy for Peronism or for Spinetta's always singular poetic and spiritual pursuits, Almendra stood out in a peculiar originality." In 1996, Spinetta reflected: "If I had to rescue something from that period it would precisely be an outpouring of lyricism, something Almendra kind of is." He used Spanish idiosyncratically, writing "y el ave aquel" instead of the correct "y el ave aquella" in "Fermín" and changing the accent of some words (a poetic device criticized by some members of the press, evident in the pronunciation of "figúrate" in "Figuración" and "plegaria" in "Plegaria para un niño dormido"). This use of the accent characterized Argentine rock's second generation—whose most notable representative was Sui Generis—until bands like Virus continued to use the language ingeniously in the 1980s. Writer Eduardo Berti felt in 2012 that the album, "endures as an effective testimony of the first steps of an exceptional composer." According to Emilio del Guercio,

Today those songs are classics but, at that time, they were considered cutting edge. Eventually I realized that most of them are threaded by the songwriting tradition of our country. They are Argentine songs. The real avant-garde revolutionizes what it inherits. Almendra was heir to the best Argentine music, and combined its elements without prejudice.

Almendra is considered a paradigm of the growing influence of the youth-led counterculture of the 1960s on Argentina at that time, as well as a representative of that generation. After Spinetta's death, President of Argentina Cristina Fernández de Kirchner said: "That record of the teardrop, when we would call albums long plays, and "Muchacha (ojos de papel)", I will never forget them." Charly García, also on the occasion of Spinetta's death, stated: "I can not describe the shock that Almendra's first album caused me. For me, "La balsa" was the originator of Argentine rock, but without a doubt, Luis Alberto and company were its architects."

== Track listing ==
All tracks are written by Luis Alberto Spinetta except where noted.

Side one
No.	Title	Length
1.	"Muchacha (Ojos de Papel)"	3:04
2.	"Color Humano" (Edelmiro Molinari)	9:09
3.	"Figuración"	3:32
4.	"Ana No Duerme"	2:42

Side two
No.	Title	Length
5.	"Fermín"	3:16
6.	"Plegaria para un Niño Dormido"	4:01
7.	"A Estos Hombres Tristes"	5:56
8.	"Que el Viento Borró Tus Manos" (Emilio del Guercio)	2:36
9.	"Laura Va"	2:48
Total length:		37:35

== Personnel ==
Credits adapted from the liner notes of Almendra.

Almendra

- Luis Alberto Spinetta – vocals, electric and acoustic guitars, rhythm guitar, harmonica
- Emilio del Guercio – bass guitar, flute, vocals, backing vocals
- Edelmiro Molinari – electric and acoustic guitars, lead guitar, bass guitar, organ, piano, backing vocals
- Rodolfo García – drums, tambourine, jingle bell, whistling, backing vocals, percussive addition

Guests

- Pappo [sic], Sam and "other Circus people" – backing vocals in "Figuración"
- Santiago Giacobbe – organ in "Ana no duerme"
- Rodolfo Alchourron – guitar, arrangements and conducting in "Laura va"

Acknowledgements

- Alicia Varadi – harp
- Simón Zlotnik – viola
- Bernardo Stalman – violin
- Tito Mariano – glockenspiel
- Walter Cironi – bassoon
- Gustavo Bergalli – flugelhorn
- Mario Tenreyro – French horn
- Carlos Pompeyo – flute
- Alberto Misrahi – bass clarinet
- José Bragato – cello
- Rodolfo Mederos – bandoneón
- Óscar Figueroa – coordination

== See also ==
- Origins of Argentine rock
- Cultural impact of the Beatles
- Garage rock
- Uruguayan Invasion
- Pescado Rabioso
- Aquelarre
- Color Humano

== Bibliography ==
- Alabarces, Pablo (November 1, 1993). Entre gatos y violadores: el rock nacional en la cultura argentina (in Spanish). Buenos Aires, Argentina: Colihue. ISBN 950-581-243-4.
- Diez, Juan Carlos (2012) [2006]. Martropía. Conversaciones con Spinetta (in Spanish). Buenos Aires: Aguilar. ISBN 978-987-04-2677-6.
- Larrea, Agustina (May 1, 2014). Quién es la chica: Las musas que inspiraron las grandes canciones del rock argentino (in Spanish). Random House. p. 13. ISBN 9789873650307.
- Marchi, Sergio (2019). Spinetta: Ruido de magia (eBook) (in Spanish). Buenos Aires, Argentina: Planeta. ISBN 978-950-49-6901-3.
- Maritano, Alma; Petruzzi, Herminia L. (2009). Teatro por la identidad: antología (in Spanish). Buenos Aires, Argentina: Ediciones Colihue. p. 188. ISBN 978-950-581-159-5.
- Pintos, Víctor (1993). Tanguito: La verdadera historia (in Spanish). Buenos Aires, Argentina: Planeta. ISBN 950-742-375-3.
- Polimeni, Carlos (2002). Bailando sobre los escombros: historia crítica del rock latinoamericano (in Spanish). Buenos Aires, Argentina: Editorial Biblos. p. 101. ISBN 978-950-786-298-4.
- Spinetta, Luis A.; Berti, Eduardo (2014) [1988]. Crónica e iluminaciones (in Spanish). Buenos Aires, Argentina: Editora AC, Planeta. ISBN 978-950-49-4055-5.
