= Héctor Varela (musician) =

Argentine musician

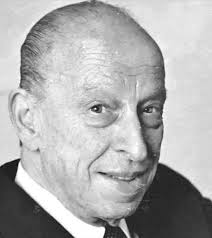
- Héctor Varela

Background information
- Also known as: El as del tango
- Born: Salustiano Paco Varela; January 29, 1914; Avellaneda, Buenos Aires Province, Argentina
- Died: January 30, 1987 (aged 73) Buenos Aires, Argentina
- Genres: Tango
- Occupations: Bandoneonist, composer, arranger, orchestra conductor
- Instruments: Bandoneon
- Years active: 1929–1971

Salustiano Paco Varela (29 January 1914 – 30 January 1987), also known by his nickname "El as del tango" (The ace of tango), was an Argentine tango bandoneonist, bandleader and composer.

== Life ==
Salustiano Paco Varela was born in Avellaneda, Buenos Aires Province, into a middle-class family that was able to support his university education. He graduated as a public accountant to fulfill his parents' wishes, although he never practiced the profession. His mother, however, frequently mentioned his academic title when speaking about her son.

Varela’s true passion lay in music. He pursued his artistic training at the conservatory of Maestro Eladio Blanco, who would later perform with the orchestra of Juan D'Arienzo.

=== Professional career ===
He began his professional career in 1929 at the age of 16, performing with the orchestra of Salvador Grupillo. He later joined the orchestra of Alberto Gambino, which led to his participation in the popular radio program Chispazos de tradición.

In the early 1930s, notable tango singers Tita Merello and Libertad Lamarque requested his accompaniment on bandoneon. However, in 1934, Varela joined the orchestra of Juan D'Arienzo as lead bandoneonist.

In 1935, he was invited by Enrique Santos Discépolo to join his ensemble, which performed on Radio Municipal and at various downtown venues. The group included other prominent musicians such as Lalo Scalise, Américo Caggiano, and Aníbal Troilo.

In 1939, Varela formed his own orchestra, although he would later return to D'Arienzo’s ensemble. His orchestra featured distinguished musicians including violinist Cayetano Puglisi and pianist Fulvio Salamanca. Varela remained with D'Arienzo for approximately ten years, also contributing as a composer. His works from this period include Chichiponía, Bien polenta, Te espero en Rodríguez Peña, Salí de perdedor, Sí supieras que la extraño, and Don Alfonso. His reputation grew during national tours, summer performances at Hotel Carrasco in Montevideo, regular shows at neighborhood clubs, and major concerts at Chantecler, one of the most renowned tango venues.

In 1951, Varela re-formed his orchestra, incorporating vocalists Armando Laborde and Rodolfo Lesica, pianist César Zagnoli, bandoneonists Antonio Marchese and Alberto San Miguel, and violinists Hugo Baralis and Mario Abramovich. The group recorded under the Pampa label, with their performances presented by broadcaster Cacho Fontana.

Following the departure of vocalist Armando Laborde from the orchestra, Argentino Ledesma joined the ensemble, forming a duo that gained significant popularity with audiences and led to tours throughout South America. Over the years, a number of prominent tango singers performed with the orchestra, including Raúl Lavié, Ernesto Herrera, Carlos Yanel, Claudio Bergé, Carlos Nogues, Jorge Rolando, Marcelo Peña, Jorge Falcón, Fernando Soler, and Diego Solís.

Throughout its long trajectory, Varela’s orchestra recorded a total of 383 tracks. Its final recording was released under the Columbia label, featuring the song Que no muera este amor, performed by Carlos Damián and Hugo Carrasco. The orchestra regularly performed at iconic tango venues such as Marabú and Chantecler, and made frequent radio appearances, including on the Glostora Tango Club. International engagements included performances in Rio de Janeiro, where Varela presented works such as Noches de Brasil, Historias de un amor, and Mi corazón es un violín.

During the 1960s and 1970s, Varela appeared on the popular television program Grandes Valores del Tango, initially hosted by Juan Carlos Thorry and later by Silvio Soldán.

In 1979, he made a cinematic appearance in the musical film La carpa del amor, which also featured artists such as Cacho Castaña, Tormenta, Jorge Martínez, and Mónica Gonzaga.

== Songs ==
- Fumando espero
- Viejo rincón
- Fueron tres años
- Que tarde que has venido
- Silueta porteña
- Si me hablaras corazón
- Portero
- Suba y diga
- Eras como la flor
- Noches de Brasil
- Azúcar pimienta y sal
- Y todavía te quiero
- A media luz
- El destino la llevo
- Padrino pelao
- Royal Pigall
- Lilian
- Tiempos viejos
- El destino lo llevó
