= Aquelarre (band) =

- Origin: Buenos Aires, Argentina
- Genres: Prog rock
- Years active: 1971-1977
- Labels: Trova, Talent/Microfon
- Spinoff of: Almendra
- Members: Héctor Starc; Hugo González Neira; Emilio del Güercio; Rodolfo García

Aquelarre was an Argentine progressive rock band founded in 1971 in Buenos Aires, Argentina, by ex-Almendra members: Emilio del Güercio and Rodolfo García.. The group relocated briefly to Spain, and disbanded in 1977.

== Career ==
After the dissolution of Almendra in 1970, Argentine musicians Emilio del Güercio (bass) and Rodolfo García (drums) joined with Héctor Starc (guitar) and Hugo González Neira (keyboard) to form Aquelarre. The official debut of the band was in 1972 (even though they had performed previously in B.A.Rock II festival, 1971), and they recorded their first album (Aquelarre) later that year. It was followed by Candiles (1973), Brumas (1974) and Siesta (1975). In 1975, they started a tour in Spain. They returned to Argentina (without González Neira) in 1977 for their goodbye concert.

Their music was more sophisticated than the standard Argentine rock-and-roll from the early 1970s, with constant rhythmic and melodic changes, surrealistic lyrics, and even free jazz passages.

== Discography ==
- Aquelarre (1972)
- Candiles (1973)
- Brumas (1974)
- Siesta (1975)
- Corazones del Lado del Fuego (1999)
- Otras Pistas (2006)
- Aquelarre (Box Set) (2008) - Includes all previously released Six Albums in 2006 reissues.
