= Luis Alberto Spinetta =

Argentine musician (1950–2012)

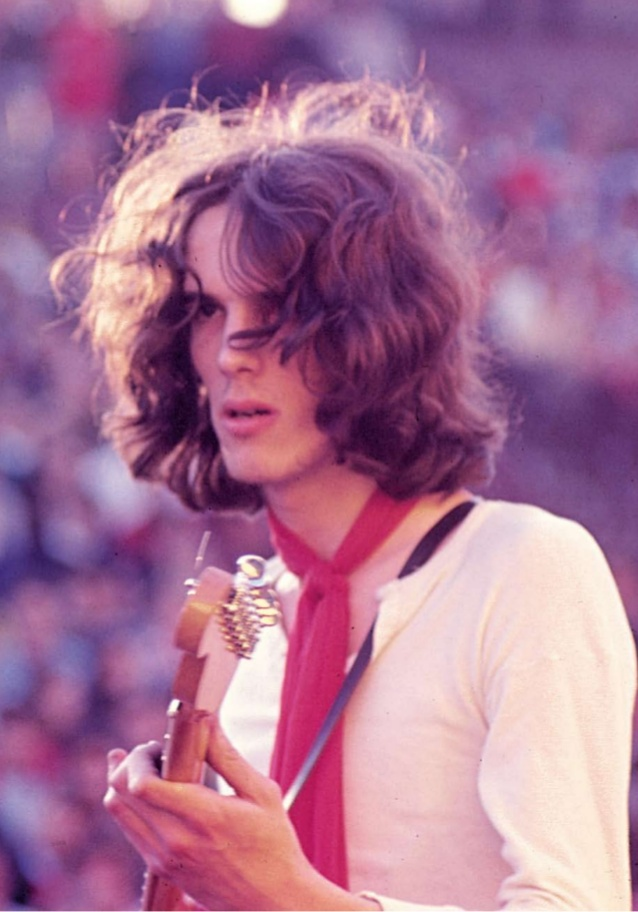
- Spinetta performing with Almendra at Festival Pinap, 1969.
- Born: 23 January 1950; Buenos Aires, Argentina
- Died: 8 February 2012 (aged 62); Buenos Aires, Argentina
- Resting place: Ashes scattered in the Río de la Plata, facing the Remembrance park
- Occupations: Singer; songwriter; composer; guitarist; poet
- Years active: 1967–2012
- Height: 1.84 m (6 ft 1/2 in)
- Spouse: Patricia Salazar (m. 1976; div. 1995)
- Children: 4, including Dante
- Musical career
- Genres: Jazz rock; psychedelic rock; progressive rock; folk; hard rock; art rock; pop
- Instruments: Vocals; guitar; keyboards
- Labels: RCA Victor; Talent-Microfón; Discos CBS; Interdisc; Del Cielito; EMI; PolyGram; Sony Music; UMG
- Formerly of: Almendra; Pescado Rabioso; Invisible; Spinetta Jade

Luis Alberto Spinetta (23 January 1950 – 8 February 2012) was an Argentine singer, guitarist, composer, writer and poet. One of the most influential rock musicians of Argentina, he is widely regarded as one of the founders of Argentine rock, which is considered one of the first incarnations of Spanish-language rock. Born in Buenos Aires, he was the founder of several iconic rock bands including Almendra, Pescado Rabioso, Invisible, Spinetta Jade, and Spinetta y Los Socios del Desierto. In Argentina, January 23rd is celebrated as "Día Nacional del Músico" (National Musician's Day) in honor of Spinetta's birth.

Spinetta devoted himself fully to his own music. In his lyrics, there are influences of multiple writers, poets and artists like Arthur Rimbaud, Vincent van Gogh, Carl Jung, Sigmund Freud, Friedrich Nietzsche, Michel Foucault, Gilles Deleuze, Carlos Castañeda and Antonin Artaud, whom the album Artaud (1973) is named after.

In December 2011 he announced that he had been diagnosed with lung cancer. He died on 8 February 2012 at the age of 62. His ashes were scattered in Buenos Aires in the waters of the Río de la Plata, according to his last wish.

== Biography ==
Luis Alberto Spinetta was born on 23 January 1950 as the second of three siblings: Ana María and Carlos Gustavo, the latter of which also became a musician, to Luis Santiago and Julia (née Ramírez), and grew up in the neighborhood of Núñez in Buenos Aires. His childhood home was only two blocks away from the Estadio Monumental. Luis Santiago was an amateur tango singer who formed a group accompanied by guitarists and performed on several radio stations. Through his father, Spinetta was of Italian descent, as his great-grandfather was from the municipality of Carrega Ligure in the Piedmont region.

Amid the counterculture of the 1960s and the political turmoil in Argentina, several artists during this time would develop Luis Alberto's musical range, especially the work of the Beatles. In one such case for example in 1964, during the height of Beatlemania, after winning a local music competition, Spinetta used the earnings to purchase their recently released album, Beatles for Sale. Spinetta also credited Los Shakers, a Uruguayan rock band heavily influenced by the look and sound to that of the Beatles, and their leader, Hugo Fattoruso. With these personal and cultural influences, Spinetta began to compose songs from a very young age, even before learning to play an instrument, even composing a hymn about Domingo Faustino Sarmiento. In a 1988 interview, Spinetta said, "I had fun imitating singers, copying sounds. That's why music was born in me before words." Spinetta also began singing tango songs and, from the age of four, his family, especially his uncles, encouraged him to sing at family gatherings. The influence of tango would be noticeable throughout Spinetta’s work. Three of his uncles worked at Columbia Records which allowed him access to a wide variety of musical expressions at a time when access to records was very expensive. Spinetta said several times that his artistic debut took place in 1964 in a television contest called Escala Musical on El Trece, although his father mentions that year he also sang in a children's program called La pandilla One and Two, later known as Pandilla Uanantú, which was broadcast on El Nueve between March and May 1964. Spinetta attended San Román high school.

Having grown near Estadio Monumental, Spinetta was a lifelong supporter of Club Atlético River Plate, having mentioned the club in his song, "El anillo del Capitán Beto," a track from the album El jardín de los presentes during his tenure with Invisible.

== Music ==
=== 1960s and 1970s ===
In 1969, Spinetta's band, Almendra, recorded their self-titled first album. They started recording and playing intensively, becoming successful almost overnight. Almendra composed their own songs and their lyrics were written in Spanish, something which was still new for Argentine rock music. After two albums that were received with critical acclaim and continuous radio exposure, the band split.

After a lengthy stay in Europe, Spinetta returned to Argentina and afterwards formed a new band, named Pescado Rabioso. With a far more powerful sound and expressing through their songs the tension of the streets in an increasingly violent Argentina, Pescado made their album debut in 1972. It was both a continuation of the creative stream of Spinetta and a drastic change in the style of his own music and lyrics. Later, the band recorded a second album named Pescado 2. Although a third album, released in 1973 and called Artaud, carried the band's name, the band had actually already dissolved. Therefore, it was mostly a solo album by Spinetta himself. Partly inspired by the writings of Theatre of Cruelty creator Antonin Artaud, particularly his essays Van Gogh, le suicidé de la société ("Van Gogh, the suicide by society") and Héliogabale ou l'Anarchiste couronné ("Heliogabalus, or the anarchist crowned"), Spinetta exorcised many of the demons of his past in this album. He simultaneously released a manifesto entitled Rock: música dura, la suicidada por la sociedad ("Rock: tough music, suicided by society"), a reference to Artaud's essay, in which he denounced the nihilistic hedonism and commercialisation he saw as having corrupted rock music. This process would open the door to a new era in his music.

In 1974, Spinetta formed a new band, Invisible, whose music was based in progressive rock and psychedelia. With his new band he recorded three albums: Invisible, Durazno sangrando and El jardín de los presentes. In the latter, Spinetta took a novel approach, incorporating elements of tango and jazz into his sound.

After recording and editing a failed album in the United States in 1979, with lyrics in English and destined to the U.S. market, Spinetta returned to Argentina to record two albums with a short-lived Almendra revival (one with original songs and the other live), and embarked on a new project, Spinetta Jade.

=== 1980s and beyond ===
Spinetta Jade would later become highly successful; through this band, Spinetta expanded the sound he was building since Invisible, a blend of jazz and rock. Withdrawing from the symphonic rock that dominated the middle 70s, and escaping the boom of new wave, punk, reggae, glam pop that reached both the world and Argentina in the 1980s. These four albums, Alma de Diamante (1980), Los Niños que Escriben en el Cielo (1981), Bajo Belgrano (1983) and Madre en Años Luz (1984), represent a defined style as well as the footprints of Spinetta's evolution. Spinetta and Charly García (with their respective bands at the moment, Jade and Serú Giran) joined efforts and gave what was considered amongst the most important shows in the history of Argentine rock. After dissolving Spinetta Jade in 1984, Spinetta worked on an album with Charly, but eventually they abandoned their efforts. Only two songs remain of the ill-fated effort, "Rezo por Vos" and "Total Interferencia".

By 1982, Spinetta had restarted his solo projects. Kamikaze (1982) puts together a number of previously unreleased songs (one gem is an early song he composed in 1965 called "Barro Tal Vez"). In Mondo Di Cromo (1983) Spinetta's new production, from 1986 to 1993, would include four solo albums (Privé, 1986), Téster de Violencia (1988), Don Lucero (1989), Pelusón of Milk (1991), a joint album with Fito Páez, another Argentine great (La La La, 1986), and the soundtrack of the movie Fuego Gris (named after the film, 1993).

After a long hiatus, largely due to Spinetta's conflicts with recording companies, he finally opened a new period in his music with his new band: Spinetta y los Socios del Desierto. Over three years (1997–1999) the band released four albums. Two studio albums, the double Socios del Desierto (1997) and Los Ojos (1999) would bring a new sound. The band made an MTV Unplugged live album, Estrelicia (1998), which, because of its soft acoustics, contrasts with their live album, San Cristóforo (1998). As Spinetta said at the beginning of the first concert, "Fans de lo acústico, abstenerse" ("Fans of acoustic music, refrain"). In 1998, he selected the featured songs and artwork of a greatest hits album called Elija y Gane, which was released the same year.

The band dissolved quietly towards the end of 1999. Spinetta started a solo career, including Silver Sorgo (2001), Obras en Vivo (2002), a live album, Para Los Árboles (2003), Camalotus (2004), a single of three unreleased songs and one remix, Pan (2006) and Un Mañana (2008). In 2005, he received the Platinum Konex Award for best rock soloist of the 1995–2005 decade. A number of books and TV documentaries have been devoted to him, like Argentine writer Eduardo Berti's, which includes a long conversation with Spinetta, among many others

Spinetta celebrated his 40 years in music with a five-and-a-half-hour concert called "Spinetta y las Bandas Eternas" (Spinetta and The Eternal Bands) in front of 40 thousand fans at Vélez Sarsfield Stadium in Buenos Aires. It was later considered by Argentine music critics as "the greatest gig of the decade".

== Personal life and death ==
Spinetta was married to Patricia Salazar from 1976 until 1995. The couple had four children: Catarina, Dante, Valentino and Vera. Salazar died in 2021. He was in a relationship with Carolina Peleritti from 1996 to 2000. Before his death, Spinetta lived on Iberá Street in the Villa Urquiza neighborhood of Buenos Aires. In December 2011, Spinetta released a statement that he had cancer. Spinetta died of lung cancer at 62 years of age on 8 February 2012.

== Recognition ==
Spinetta was awarded the Gardel de Oro in 2009. In 2013, a statue of Spinetta was put in Villa Urquiza at Roosevelt and Triunvirato. It was later moved to Commune 12 to prevent further vandalism. In 2016, at the intersection of Avenida Congreso and the Mitre Railway tracks, an underpass was named after Spinetta. On 23 January 2020, Google celebrated his 70th birthday with a Google Doodle.

== Discography ==
=== Almendra ===
Studio albums

- Almendra (1969)
- Almendra II (1970)
- El Valle Interior (1980)

Live albums

- Almendra en Obras I/II (1980)

=== Pescado Rabioso ===
- Desatormentándonos (1972)
- Pescado 2 (1973)
- Artaud (1973)

=== Invisible ===
Studio albums

- Invisible (1974)
- Durazno sangrando (1975)
- El jardín de los presentes (1976)

Non-album singles

- "Estado de coma" (1974)
- "La llave del Mandala" (1974)
- "Viejos ratones del tiempo" (1974)

Live albums

- En Vivo Teatro Coliseo 1975 (2022)

=== Spinetta Jade ===
- Alma de Diamante (1980)
- Los Niños Que Escriben En El Cielo (1981)
- Bajo Belgrano (1983)
- Madre en Años Luz (1984)

=== Spinetta y los Socios del Desierto ===
Studio albums

- Socios del Desierto (1996)
- Los Ojos (1999)

Live albums

- San Cristóforo (1998)

=== Solo ===
Studio albums

- Spinettalandia y Sus Amigos - La Búsqueda de la Estrella (1971)
- Artaud (1973, credited to Pescado Rabioso)
- A 18´ del Sol (1977)
- Only Love Can Sustain (1980)
- Kamikaze (1982)
- Mondo Di Cromo (1983)
- Privé (1986)
- La La La (1986, with Fito Páez)
- Téster de Violencia (1988)
- Don Lucero (1989)
- Pelusón of Milk (1991)
- Fuego Gris (1993, soundtrack)
- Silver Sorgo (2001)
- Para los Árboles (2003)
- Camalotus (2004)
- Pan (2006)
- Un Mañana (2008)
- Los Amigo (2015, posthumous)

Live albums

- Exactas (1990, live)
- Estrelicia (1997, MTV Unplugged)
- San Cristóforo: Un Sauna de Lava Eléctrico (1998, live)
- Argentina Sorgo Films Presenta: Spinetta Obras (2002, live)
- Spinetta y las Bandas Eternas (2010, live)
- Presentación ARTAUD - 1973 - Teatro Astral (2020, official bootleg)
- Presentación ARTAUD - 1973 - Teatro Astral Vol. 2 (2021, official bootleg)

Compilations

- Elija y Gane (1999, greatest hits)
- Ya no mires atrás (2020, unreleased material) (recorded 2008–09)

== Poetry ==
- 1978: Guitarra negra (English: "Black Guitar"). Buenos Aires: Ediciones Tres Tiempos.
