= Spinetta Jade =

Argentine jazz-rock band

- Origin: Buenos Aires, Argentina
- Genres: Progressive rock; Jazz rock
- Years active: 1980–1985
- Labels: Mordisco-Ratón Finta; Universal
- Past members: Luis Alberto Spinetta; Pedro Aznar; Héctor "Pomo" Lorenzo; Diego Rapoport; Beto Satragni; Juan del Barrio; Frank Ojstersek; Leo Sujatovich; César Franov; Juan Carlos Mono Fontana; Lito Epumer; Lito Vitale; Paul Dourge

Spinetta Jade was an Argentine rock-jazz band active between 1980 and 1985, interspersed with Almendra's reunion and the solo career of Luis Alberto Spinetta.

== History ==
=== Beginnings ===
The band initially included Luis Alberto Spinetta (guitar and main vocals), Pedro Aznar (bass-guitar), Lito Vitale (keyboards), Juan del Barrio (keyboards) and Pomo Lorenzo (drums).

=== Alma de Diamante and concert with Serú Girán ===
In August 1980, after the substitution of Lito Vitale for Diego Rapoport on keyboards, and Pedro Aznar for Beto Satragni on bass guitar, the band released the album Alma de Diamante. Then, in September, Jade was changed for Serú Girán in a concert.

=== Los niños que escriben en el cielo ===
After some modifications in the lineup of the band (Beto Satragni was substituted by Frank Ojstersek on bass guitar, and Juan del Barrio by Leo Sujatovich on keyboards), Jade released the album Los niños que escriben en el cielo in the Prima Rock Festival in September 1981.

=== Bajo Belgrano ===
After the solo album of Spinetta, Kamikaze, and more modifications in the band's lineup (Frank Ojstersek was replaced for César Franov on bass guitar), the album Bajo Belgrano was released between another Spinetta solo album: Mondo di Cromo. The third album of Jade had pop influences.

=== Madre en años luz and final years ===
In 1984, the band included Lito Epumer on lead guitar, and Leo Sujatovich was replaced by Mono Fontana on keyboards. They went on to release their fourth and last album, Madre en años luz, with a concert at the Luna Park Stadium. This album has since influenced a lot of synth-pop sounds popular in Argentinian bands from the 1980s. Then, in the middle of 1985, with Paul Dourge on Mini Moog, the band was dissolved.

== Members ==
Alma de diamante
Los niños que escriben en el cielo

Bajo Belgrano
Madre en años luz

1980
1981
1982
1983
1984
1985
Luis Alberto Spinetta
B. Satragni
Frank Ojstersek
César Franov
P. Dourge
J. del Barrio
Leo Sujatovich
Hector "Pomo" Lorenzo
Diego Rapoport

Juan Carlos "Mono" Fontana

Lito Epumer

Edited album	Guitar and main vocals	Bass guitar	Keyboards

Main guitar	Drums	Keyboards 2

== Discography ==
=== Studio albums ===
Year	Title	Label
1980	Alma de diamante	Mordisco - Ratón Finta
1981	Los niños que escriben en el cielo	Universal
1983	Bajo Belgrano	Universal
1984	Madre en años luz	Universal
