= Nacha Guevara =

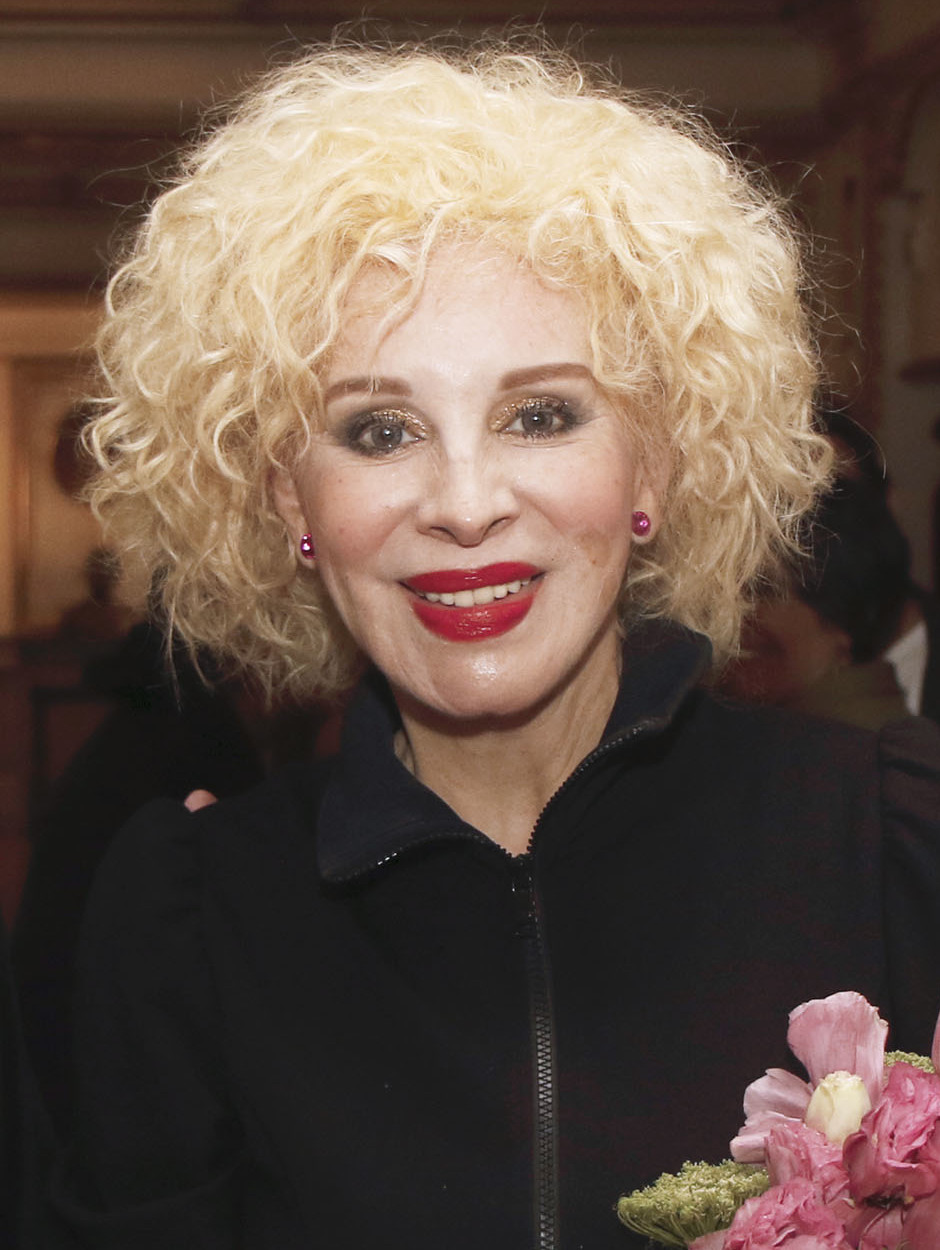
- Nacha Guevara in 2019

Background information
- Born: Clotilde Acosta; October 3, 1940 (age 86); Mar de Plata, Argentina
- Occupations: Musician, singer, songwriter, actress, dancer
- Instrument: Vocals

Nacha Guevara (born Clotilde Acosta, October 3, 1940) is an Argentine singer-songwriter, dancer, and actress from Mar de Plata, Buenos Aires province.

== Biography ==
Trained as a dancer and actress, she discovered by chance a career as a singer becoming a symbol around 1968 in the avant-garde movement at Instituto Di Tella in Buenos Aires, the preeminent pioneer center for visual and theater experimentation at that time. She was a controversial cult figure in the underground movement and as a singer-songwriter in the "café-concert" scene, singing tunes and parodies by Boris Vian, Georges Brassens, Tom Lehrer, Nicolas Guillén and Argentine writers including Julio Cortázar, Jorge de la Vega, Ernesto Schoo and others.

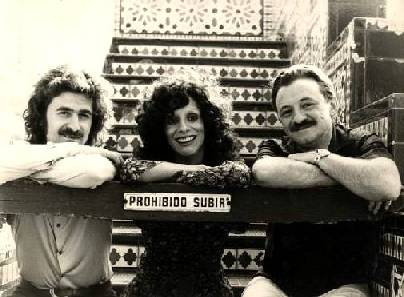
With poet Mario Benedetti and musician Alberto Favero, 1973

According to a 1974 interview she adopted her stage name in the mid-1960s, "Nacha", as a family tradition, and "Guevara" due to a "problem of identity", before Che was well known.

At the beginning of 1970 one of her pivotal works was Nacha sings Benedetti, where she and Alberto Favero, musical partner and at that time husband, adapted some of the most famous poems of Uruguayan poet Mario Benedetti to music.

In 1973, she obtained great recognition by critics and audiences with a big revue named Las mil y una Nachas ("One thousand and one Nachas"). Nacha Guevara exiled herself first to Peru then Mexico in 1974, threatened by the Triple A death squad. She attempted to make a comeback in 1975 with a new version of Las mil y una Nachas. The show was never performed. After the dress rehearsal prior to the opening night, a bomb destroyed the theater, killing a member of the crew and forcing her to flee the country once more.

She continued a successful career in Mexico, Cuba and Spain with performances in New York City, Chicago and Havana too, before returning to Argentina.

Nacha Guevara has acted in numerous Argentine films, as well as on Broadway. However, she is best known for her extensive musical career, which has been realized throughout the world and over several decades.

After the end of the Argentine dictatorship she came back to her native country in 1984. In 1986, she starred in Pedro Orgambide's Eva, the great Argentinian musical, an Argentinian answer to the musical Evita by Andrew Lloyd Webber. The show was redone for a bigger version in 2008.

In the last decades she won recognition as an actress, participating in movies and TV shows such as Alas, Poder y Pasión ("Wings, Power and Passion") and films as El Lado Oscuro del Corazón ("The Dark Side of the Heart") and its sequel, where she plays Death, a symbolic character who is in love with the hero and harasses him, trying to take him to the other side.

On June 1, 2004, the newspapers announced Nacha's appointment as executive director of the Fondo Nacional de las Artes, a position that did not exist in the Fund's organizational chart. Despite this, on August 11 she resigned from the position she had not yet assumed due to the lack of budget to finance the salary of the future executive director.

Ahead of the June 2009 legislative elections, Guevara has supported the ruling Front for Victory party of President Cristina Fernández de Kirchner as a National Deputy for Buenos Aires Province, on the list headed by former President Néstor Kirchner.

== Discography ==
=== Studio albums ===
- Nacha Guevara canta (1968)
- Mezzo Soprano (1969)
- Nacha Guevara (1970)
- Nacha canta Benedetti (1972)
- Canciones para mis hijos (1973)
- Amor de ciudad grande (1977)
- Para cuando me vaya (1978)
- Aquí estoy (1981)
- Viva Sevilla (1982)
- Los patitos feos (1984)
- Eva, el gran musical argentino (1986)
- Heavy Tango (1991)
- La historia del soldado (2003)
- Voy a cantar lo que se me canta (2023)

=== Live albums ===
- Este es el año que es (1971)
- Las mil y una Nachas (1974)
- Nacha Guevara en vivo (1975)
- Nacha canta a Benedetti (1976)
- Esta noche en vivo (1976)
- Nacha de noche (1977)
- En vivo con Benedetti y Favero (1979)
- Nacha Guevara canta a Benedetti (1985)
- Nacha de noche (1985)
- Nacha Guevara en concierto (1988)
- La vida en tiempo de tango (2000)

=== Compilations ===
- Sus primeras grabaciones (1978)
- Grandes canciones de Nacha Guevara (1984)
- Aquí estoy (1984)
- No llores por mí, Argentina (1987)
- Mis momentos (1997)
- Los esenciales (2002)
- Éxitos originales (2003)
