= Rodolfo Mederos =

Argentine musician

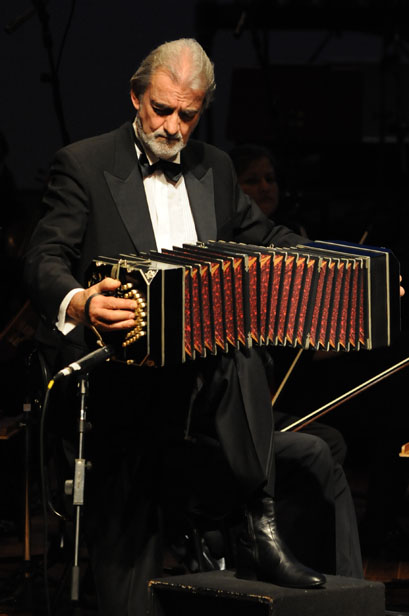
Rodolfo Mederos

Rodolfo Mederos (born March 25, 1940) is an Argentine bandoneonist, composer and arranger. He lived in Cuba and France; in Argentina, he founded the experimental group Generación Cero.

== Early life ==
Mederos was born in the Constitución neighbourhood of Buenos Aires. He spent his childhood in the province of Entre Ríos, and later went to the University of Córdoba to study biology.

As a young man he was an admirer of fellow bandoneonist Ástor Piazzolla. He played with Piazzolla for several years before joining the Osvaldo Pugliese Orchestra, alongside other young musicians.

== 1960s ==
After 1960 he formed his early groups to play at provincial radio stations and on television. When he heard Mederos's Octeto Guardia Nueva during one of his tours, Astor Piazzolla suggested that Mederos should travel to Buenos Aires. Piazzolla later returned to Córdoba and invited Mederos to appear in his recitals.

In 1965 Mederos traveled to Buenos Aires and made his first record, Buenos Aires, al rojo, in which he played pieces by Cobián and Piazzolla as well as his own compositions.

After spending two years abroad, first in Cuba and later in Paris, he returned to Argentina, and in 1969 he joined the new Osvaldo Pugliese orchestra, which was formed following a decision by its former players, who wanted to play only with the ensemble, Sexteto Tango, that they had recently put together. He was in the bandoneon section with Arturo Penón, Daniel Binelli and Juan José Mosalini.

== Generación Cero ==
In 1976 Mederos started a new group, Generación Cero, which attracted a cult following, trying to create a fusion between jazz, rock and the music of Buenos Aires. Although the group contained a bandoneon, and despite other similarities, their music was not tango, either in riffs or rhythm, and the arrangements changed the melody until it was hardly recognizable. In 1976 the first LP was released, Fuera de broma 8. The subsequent albums were De todas maneras (1977), Todo hoy (1978), Buenas noches, Paula (1983), Verdades y mentiras (1984) and Reencuentros (1989).

These works reached a widespread audience, and Mederos's artistic personality was growing and achieving public acclaim, including internationally.

== 1990s ==
At the beginning of the 1990s, Mederos returned to the recording studios with a new series of CDs, in different settings: Tanguazo (1993), Carlos Gardel (1994), Mi Buenos Aires querido (with a trio that included pianist Daniel Barenboim; 1995), El día que Maradona conoció a Gardel (1996), El tanguero (1998) and Eterno Buenos Aires (1999). In 2000 he released the record Tango Mederos-Brizuela, with another disc that included the soundtrack of the film Las veredas de Saturno that he had composed twenty years before.

In 1999 Mederos formed a quintet with the pianist Hernán Posetti, the violinist Damián Bolotín, the guitarist Armando de la Vega and the double-bassist Sergio Rivas, who together recorded Eterno Buenos Aires.

== Soundtracks ==
Mederos composed the soundtrack and was also the lead actor in the French-Argentine film Les Trottoirs de Saturne (1986), directed by Hugo Santiago. Mederos also composed all or part of the soundtracks for Sergio Renán's Crecer de golpe (1976), Simón Feldman's Memorias y Olvidos (1987), Tristán Bauer's Después de la tormenta (1991), Jana Boková's Diario para un cuento (1997), Jaime Chávarri's Sus ojos se cerraron (1998) and Bebé Kamin's Contraluz (2001).

== Collaborations ==
Mederos' has appeared alongside folk, pop and rock musicians, blending tango with different rhythms and genres in a series of recitals. Other collaborations include recordings with Enrico Rava, Mercedes Sosa and Luis Alberto Spinetta, and later with the Catalan Joan Manuel Serrat ("Cansiones"), with whom he also recorded two tracks of the album Nadie es perfecto in 1994. He appeared on the Selección Nacional de Tango album En Vivo in 2005.
