= Eduardo Berti =

Argentine writer

Eduardo Berti (1964) is an Argentine writer born in Buenos Aires. He has been living in Paris, France, since 1998. He also works as a cultural journalist.

== Biography ==
His novel La mujer de Wakefield, a re-write of Nathaniel Hawthorne's Wakefield from Twice-Told Tales, was voted one of the "books of the year" by the Times Literary Supplement (UK). It was also selected for the Rómulo Gallegos Prize, and its French translation (Mme Wakefield) was short-listed for the prestigious Prix Fémina.

His latest novel, Todos los Funes, was a finalist for the Spanish Premio Herralde award.

Berti's books, originally published in Argentina and Spain, have been translated into English (Pushkin Press, UK), Korean and Japanese (Schinchosa), Portuguese (Temas e Debates) and French (Actes Sud and Grasset).

His translations from English into Spanish include With Borges (by Alberto Manguel), The Sandglass (Romesh Gunesekera), American Notebooks, a selection (Nathaniel Hawthorne), Lady Susan (Jane Austen), and also a couple of anthologies such as New York short stories (Edith Wharton, O. Henry, Thomas Wolfe, Dorothy Parker, etc.). He also translates from French into English, and is the author and translator of the anthology Contemporary French Short-Stories (2006), published in Spain.

In 2014, he was elected as a member of the Oulipo.

== Works ==
- Spinetta: Crónica e iluminaciones (1988, second edition 2014). Biography. Planeta.
- Rockología: Documentos de los '80 (1989, new editions 1994 and 2012). Music journalism. AC/Beas/Galerna.
- Los pájaros (1994). Short stories. Beas/Páginas de Espuma.
- Agua (1997). Novel. Tusquets. (Prix Fémina finalist)
- La mujer de Wakefield (1999). Novel. Tusquets.
- La vida imposible (2002). Flash fiction. Emecé.
- Todos los Funes (2004). Novel. Anagrama. (Premio Herralde finalist.)
- Los pequeños espejos (2007). Aphorisms and flash fiction. Meet.
- La sombra del púgil (2008). Novel. Norma/La otra orilla.
- Lo inolvidable (2010). Short stories. Páginas de Espuma.
- El país imaginado (2011). Novel. Emecé/Impedimenta.
- Un padre extranjero (2016). Novel. Tusquets.
- Une présence idéale (2017). Novel. Flammarion.
- Inventario de inventos (inventados) (2017). Impedimenta.
- La máquina de escribir caracteres chinos (2017). Novel. Tusquets.
- Faster (2019). Novel. Impedimenta.
- Por. Lecturas y reescrituras de una canción de Luis Alberto Spinetta (2019). Gourmet Musical.
