= Almendra (band) =

Argentine band

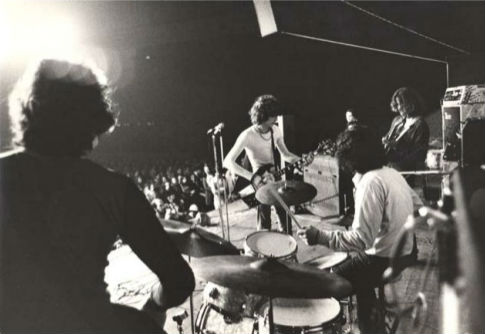
- Almendra in concert, 1970

Background information
- Origin: Buenos Aires, Argentina
- Genres: Psychedelic rock; psychedelic pop; folk; art rock; progressive rock; pop rock
- Years active: 1967–1970; 1979–1981; 2009
- Labels: RCA Victor, Almendra Editora
- Past members: Luis Alberto Spinetta; Edelmiro Molinari; Emilio del Guercio; Rodolfo García

Almendra was an Argentine Rock band from Buenos Aires, Argentina. Led by guitarist and lyricist Luis Alberto Spinetta, Almendra released between 1968 and 1971 a few singles and two albums – Almendra and Almendra II – that revolutionized the sound of Argentine rock for the remainder of the 20th century and almost single-handedly changed the way local rock music was perceived by critics and audiences. Widely compared to The Beatles by their local contemporaries, Almendra did not survive the 1960s and the making of a planned rock opera, though all individual members went on to form the backbone of Argentine rock in the 1970s.

== Formation ==
Almendra was formed in 1968 after the breakup of three teenage school groups: Los Sbirros, Los Mods and Los Larkins. The initial rehearsals were held at Spinetta's house in Belgrano, an upper-middle-class neighbourhood of Buenos Aires. By mid-1968, they met producer Ricardo Kleiman, who signed them to record a single. Kleiman was the owner of the clothing shop Modart and ran a radio show, Modart en la Noche ("Modart at Night"), that aired the latest international releases of beat and rock music.

On September 20, 1968, Tema de Pototo (a.k.a. Para saber cómo es la soledad) b/w El mundo entre las manos was released. Tema de Pototo is a beat ballad about a friend they thought was dead. Both sides feature orchestral arrangements by Rodolfo Alchourrón, at the request of the producer. By the end of 1968, Hoy todo el hielo en la ciudad (with fuzz guitar work by Edelmiro), reach the stores. The b-side features Campos verdes for which a promotional film was made.

Almendra played during the summer at the beginning of 1969 in Mar del Plata, a resort city 400 km south of Buenos Aires. Their debut in Buenos Aires was on 24 March, at the di Tella Institute, the centre of avant-garde 60s culture in Argentina. Almendra spent the rest of the year performing at different venues, until 21 September, first day of Spring and Student's Day in Argentina, when they played at the Pinap Festival. Pinap was a beat magazine, and the Festival was the first major event of Argentine rock.

== First album ==
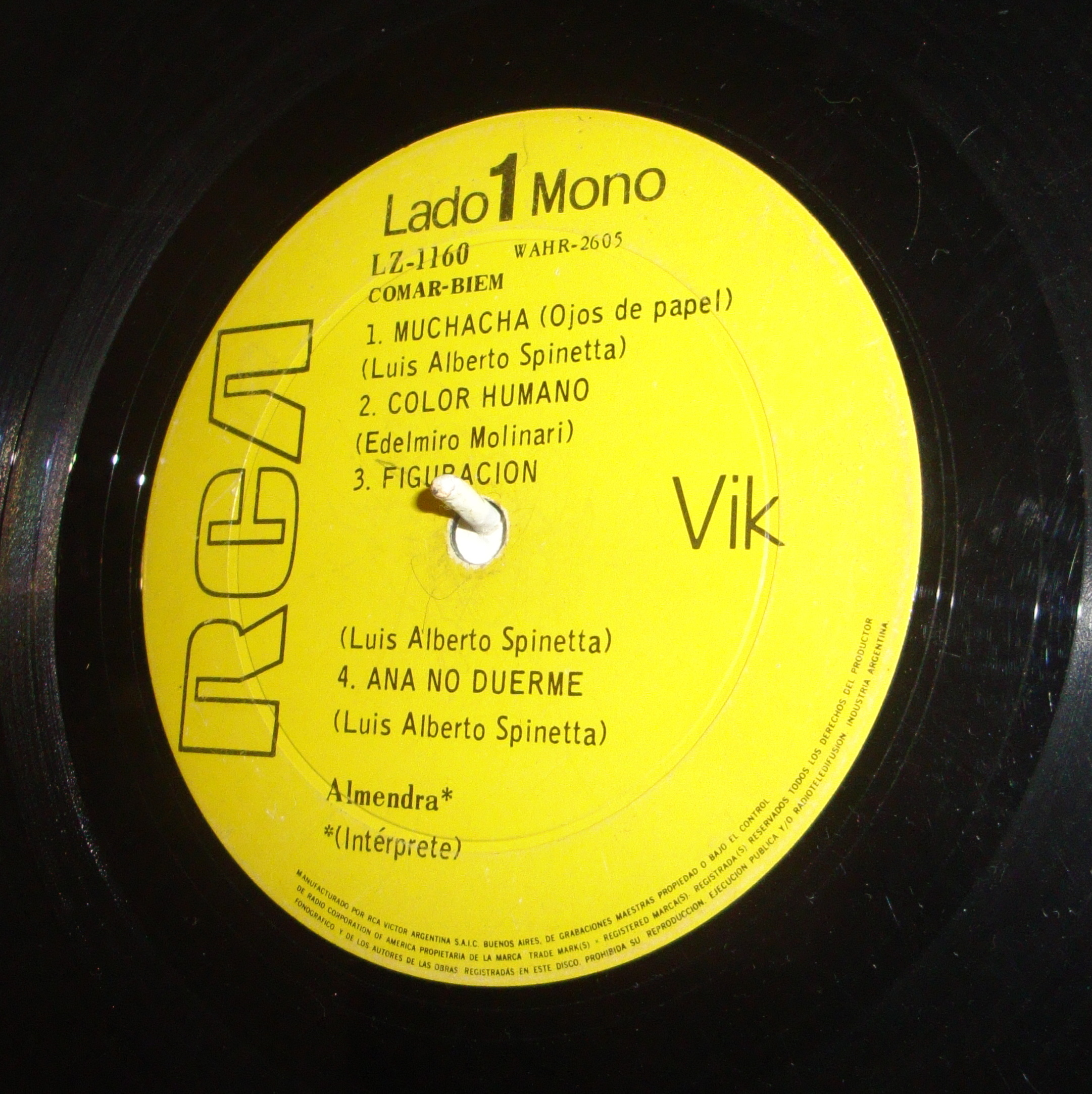
Almendra's first album

Meanwhile, the group was recording their debut album. An odd event marked the completion of it. Spinetta had drawn an enigmatic face for the cover. Days afterward, the record company claimed that the drawing had been lost, so they were planning to use a photo of the group instead. Obviously upset, the musicians looked for the lost drawing and eventually found it discarded in the garbage. Spinetta had stayed up all night reproducing his original artwork and took it to the record company the following day. The company offered no excuses the second time. The debut album was finally released on 29 November 1969. Along with the famous drawing, it included an insert with lyrics and technical information. The black and white back cover pictured the group live at the Pinap Festival.

By the end of 1969 the record company released a new single featuring Tema de Pototo and Final. The latter was originally scheduled to end their debut album, but could not make it due to time length limitations. The group wanted Gabinetes espaciales to be the a-side of this single but RCA wished to promote Pototo instead. Gabinetes espaciales was eventually included on the compilation LP Mis conjuntos preferidos (RCA Vik 3836).

In early 1970 another single was released with two songs from the album. Meanwhile, Spinetta was working on a highly ambitious project: a rock opera about humanity's inner search. But while they were working on this new album the group split.

== Double album ==
On 19 December 1970, Almendra II (a.k.a. "Almendra double album") was released, along with a new single taken from it. The 2-LP set included only traces of the unfinished opera but was full of songs that previewed what the members of the group (especially Emilio and Edelmiro) would do next. Although Spinetta was the main composer of the first album and most of the singles, it was clear that his fellow musicians had their own ideas as well.

Side A begins with Toma el tren hacia el sur featuring an Edelmiro guitar solo. Next to the short and simple Jingle, a Molinari guitar composition (No tengo idea) follows. Camino difícil, was written by Emilio. The steady rock of Rutas Argentinas (a popular song on live shows), the dark Vete de mí, cuervo negro, and two more Molinari compositions: Aire de amor (prefiguring the style of Color Humano) and Mestizo complete this side. Side B features the 14-minutes-long Agnus Dei and Para ir. Side C includes Parvas, Cometa azul, Florecen los nardos and Del Güercio's rhythm ballad Carmen. Side D begins with Obertura (obviously the ill-fated opera's overture), followed by the country-folk Amor de aire and Verde llano (both written by Edelmiro). This last side continues with Leves instrucciones, sung by Emilio & Luis Alberto and Los elefantes. Un pájaro te sostiene—a rock number written by Del Güercio—and Spinetta's guitar oriented En las cúpulas close the album.

== Aftermath ==
Almendra's split produced the bands Aquelarre, Color Humano, and Pescado Rabioso.

Years later, on 7 and 8 December 1979, Almendra reunited to play live at the Obras Sanitarias Stadium in Buenos Aires. These highly successful shows led to a big tour including various cities of Argentina and Uruguay. A 2-set live album—Almendra en Obras (Almendra ML 712 & 713), and a studio album of new material—El valle interior (Almendra ML 135)—were also released, this time on their own independent label.

Some notable compilations are 1972's Almendra (series Rock Progresivo) (RCA Vik LZ-1227) and 1977's Muchacha, ojos de papel (RCA AVS-4765). Both include singles. A rare 4-song EP with PS (RCA Vik 3ZE-3704) also exists. Also, a now rare book titled Almendra, featuring poems and drawings was published in 1970. All records were re-issued on CD. [Note: CD Cronología 1 includes the first RCA album plus all the singles and CD Cronología 2—now out of print—includes all the songs of the second album in chronological recording order, except the songs released as singles (since they are already included on Cronología 1). This way, these 2 CDs feature the Complete Almendra recordings on RCA. Also, the double RCA second album was later released as a 2-CD set with its complete original running order. BMG released a 4-CD Box with all their studio recordings.

On 4 December 2009 Almendra reunited for five songs —Color humano, Fermín, A estos hombres tristes, Hermano Perro and Muchacha (Ojos de papel)— as part of the Spinetta y las Bandas Eternas (Spinetta and The Eternal Bands) concert in the Vélez Sarsfield Stadium in Buenos Aires.

Luis Alberto Spinetta died from lung cancer at the age of 62 on 8 February 2012. On 4 May 2021, the band's former drummer, Rodolfo García, died at the age of 75 from a stroke.

== Discography ==
Singles

- 1968 - "Tema de Pototo (Para saber cómo es la soledad)" / "El mundo entre las manos" ["Pototo's Song (to know what loneliness feels like)"] (RCA Vik 31Z-1368)
- 1968 - "Hoy todo el hielo en la ciudad" / "Campos verdes" ["All of the ice in town today" / "Green Fields"] (RCA Vik 31Z-1413)
- 1969 - "Tema de Pototo" / "Final" ["Pototo's Song" / "End"] (RCA Vik 31Z-1565)
- 1970 - "Muchacha (ojos de papel)" / "Ana no duerme" ["(Paper-eyed) Girl" / "Ana Doesn't Sleep"] (RCA Vik 31Z-1633)
- 1970 - "Hermano perro" / "Mestizo"' ["Brother dog" / "Halfing"] (RCA Vik 31Z-1813)

Albums

- 1969 - Almendra
- 1970 - Almendra II (double album)
- 1980 - El Valle Interior [The Valley Within]
- 1980 - Almendra en Obras I/II [Almendra in Obras Stadium I/II] (live album)

== Legacy ==
- South American band Capsula covered "Color Humano" on their 1998 album, Sublime. They were also sampled by Captain Murphy on the song, "Gone Fishing."
