= Alejandro Ros =

Argentine graphic designer

- Born: Alejandro Rosetti; 26 June 1964 (age 62); San Miguel de Tucumán, Tucumán, Argentina
- Education: University of Buenos Aires
- Occupations: graphic designer; video director
- Years active: 1985-present
- Website: alejandroros.com.ar

Alejandro Ros (born 26 June 1964) is an Argentine graphic designer and occasional music video director. Known for designing the album covers for Argentine singers and musicians, including Luis Alberto Spinetta, Gustavo Cerati, Juana Molina, Babasónicos, Fito Páez and Miranda!, amongst others, as well as for Latin American artists like Julieta Venegas and Javiera Mena.

His work has earned him nine Gardel Awards (Argentina's main music awards) and three Latin Grammy Awards, all for Best Recording Package, receiving the award for Mercedes Sosa's Cantora 1 (2009), Vicentico's Solo un Momento (2011) and Juana Molina's Wed 21 (2014). He currently holds the records for most wins and most nominations (seven) in the category.

== Career ==
Born in San Miguel de Tucumán in Argentina, he showed interest in music from an early age, later moving to Buenos Aires to study Graphic Design at the University of Buenos Aires during his early twenties. He was one of the students from the first promotion of his career. During the nineties, Ros worked as an assistant at the studio of Sergio Perez Fernandez, Fito Páez's art director at the time. While working at the studio, he met Daniel Melero, producer for Soda Stéreo, who introduced him to various artists from the Argentine music scene for whom he would design album covers in later years. In 1998, he founded the music collective Agencia de Viajes alongside Pablo Schanton, for DJs, musicians, and assistant directors.

Some of his first prominent designs were his album covers for Soda Stéreo's last two studio albums: Dynamo (1992) and Sueño Stereo (1995). His design for Gustavo Cerati's Bocanada (1999) earned him his first Gardel Award for Best Cover Design. Ros would receive the award multiple times over the years, becoming the most awarded and nominated designer in the category. In 2002, he received the Konex Award for Graphic Design, for his work during the decade.

Since then, Ros has collaborated with various artists such as Bersuit Vergarabat's Hijos del Culo (2000) and Testosterona (2005); Juana Molina's Segundo (2000), Un día (2008) and Wed 21 (2013); Luis Alberto Spinetta's Un Mañana (2008) and his posthumous album Los Amigos (2015); Babasónicos' Jessico (2001), Infame (2003) and A Propósito (2011); Javiera Mena's debut Esquemas Juveniles (2006), Mena (2010) and Otra Era (2014); and Miranda!'s Magistral (2011) and Souvenir (2021), among many others. At the 10th Annual Latin Grammy Awards in 2009, Ros won his first Latin Grammy Award for Best Recording Package for Mercedes Sosa's double album Cantora 1 (2009). He won the award two more times, in 2011, for Vicentico's Solo un Momento (2011), tying with Spanish artist Javier Mariscal for the soundtrack album Chico & Rita, and in 2014 for Juana Molina's Wed 21 (2014). Ros has continuously been nominated in the category, namely in 2023, he received three nominations in the same year, for Miranda!'s Hotel Miranda!, Javiera Mena's Nocturna and Babasónicos' Trinchera.

=== Exhibitions ===
In 2017, he presented the exhibition Ros sin Receta as a part of 220 Cultura Contemporánea at the cultural venue Plaza de la Música in Córdoba, Argentina. The exhibition included his body of work as well as videos showcasing his collaborative work with Juana Molina for her album Halo. Also that year, he presented Perfumancia, an audio-olfactory installation that "privileges smell and hearing over sight, generating an experience that questions space and turns environmental participation into an introspective matter". The work was created by Ros and Pablo Schanton, and premiered at the Spanish art fair ARCOMadrid in Madrid.

From 21 November 2023 to 20 January 2024, a retrospective exhibition titled ROS was launched at the Museo de la Ciudad Altillo Beni in Santa Cruz de la Sierra in Bolivia, presenting both his album covers and his work for magazines.

=== Editorial work ===
From the early 90s until 2000, Ros designed covers for weekly supplements (Radar, Las/12, Soy and Página/30) for the Argentine newspaper Página 12. He has worked for various other magazines such as Revista Ramona, Revista Tokonoma, and Revista Big. Additionally, he designed the artwork for books by Nicola Costantino, Maitena, Cambre and Roberto Jacoby.

== Artworks ==
Taken from Discogs and Alejandro Ros's website.

- Fin de Semana Salvaje – Los Brujos (1991)
- La Forma del Deseo – Daniel Melero (1991)
- Colores Santos – Gustavo Cerati & Daniel Melero (1992)
- Dynamo – Soda Stereo (1992)
- Amor Amarillo – Gustavo Cerati (1993)
- Sueño Stereo – Soda Stereo (1995)
- Rara – Juana Molina (1996)
- El Último Concierto – Soda Stereo (1997)
- Estrelicia – Luis Alberto Spinetta (1997)
- Enemigos Íntimos – Fito Páez & Joaquín Sabina (1998)
- Miami – Babasónicos (1999)
- Abre – Fito Páez (1999)
- Vital – Leo García (1999)
- Bocanada – Gustavo Cerati (1999)
- Leche – Illya Kuryaki and the Valderramas (1999)
- Narigón del Siglo – Divididos (2000)
- Hola/Chau – Los Fabulosos Cadillacs (2000)
- Rey Sol – Fito Páez (2000)
- Hijos del Culo – Bersuit Vergarabat (2000)
- Segundo – Juana Molina (2000)
- Jessico – Babasónicos (2001)
- Silver Sorgo – Luis Alberto Spinetta (2001)
- Argentina Sorgo Films Presenta: Spinetta Obras – Luis Alberto Spinetta (2002)
- Tres Cosas – Juana Molina (2002)
- Bajofondo Tango Club – Bajofondo (2002)
- Vengo del Placard de Otro – Divididos (2002)
- De la Cabeza – Bersuit Vergarabat (2002)
- Sigue Tu Camino – Los Auténticos Decadentes (2003)
- Infame – Babasónicos (2003)
- Naturaleza Sangre – Fito Páez (2003)
- A○○B – Juana Molina & Alejandro Franov (2003)
- Sí – Julieta Venegas (2003)
- Para los Árboles – Luis Alberto Spinetta (2003)
- Mi Vida con Ellas – Fito Páez (2004)
- La Argentinidad al Palo – Bersuit Vergarabat (2004)
- Camalotus – Luis Alberto Spinetta (2004)
- Los Rayos – Vicentico (2004)
- Moda y Pueblo – Fito Páez (2005)
- En Vivo Sin Restricciones – Miranda! (2005)
- Testosterona – Bersuit Vergarabat (2005)
- Esquemas Juveniles – Javiera Mena (2006)
- Limón y Sal – Julieta Venegas (2006)
- El Mundo Cabe en Una Canción – Fito Páez (2006)
- Son – Juana Molina (2006)
- Pan – Luis Alberto Spinetta (2006)
- Rodolfo – Fito Páez (2007)
- Club Atlético Decadente – Los Auténticos Decadentes (2007)
- El Disco de Tu Corazón – Miranda! (2007)
- Basta – Las Pelotas (2007)
- Cosas Raras – Julieta Venegas (2007)
- Un Día – Juana Molina (2008)
- El Templo del Pop – Miranda! (2008)
- Un Mañana – Luis Alberto Spinetta (2008)
- MTV Unplugged – Julieta Venegas (2008)
- Miranda Es Imposible! – Miranda! (2009)
- No Sé Si Es Baires o Madrid – Fito Páez (2009)
- El Milagro Dance – Leo García (2009)
- 10 Años de Oro: En Vivo en el Luna Park – Damas Gratis (2009)
- Cantora – Mercedes Sosa (2009)
- Amapola del '66 – Divididos (2010)
- Otra Cosa – Julieta Venegas (2010)
- Mena – Javiera Mena (2010)
- Solo un Momento – Vicentico (2010)
- Confiá – Fito Páez (2010)
- Spinetta y las Bandas Eternas – Luis Alberto Spinetta (2010)
- A Propósito – Babasónicos (2011)
- Audio y Agua – Divididos (2011)
- Magistral – Miranda! (2011)
- Canciones para Aliens – Fito Páez (2011)
- Ahora – Pedro Aznar (2012)
- Yo Te Amo – Fito Páez (2013)
- Destinología – Tan Biónica (2013)
- Wed 21 – Juana Molina (2013)
- Otra Era – Javiera Mena (2014)
- Ángel – Mercedes Sosa (2014)
- Safari – Miranda! (2014)
- Último Acto – Vicentico (2014)
- Linyera – Daniel Melingo (2014)
- Cerati Infinito – Gustavo Cerati (2015)
- Los Amigo – Luis Alberto Spinetta (2015)
- Impuesto de Fe – Babasónicos (2016)
- Anda – Daniel Melingo (2016)
- La Ciudad Liberada – Fito Páez (2017)
- Fuerte – Miranda! (2017)
- Halo – Juana Molina (2017)
- Espejo – Javiera Mena (2018)
- Satélite Cerati – Gustavo Cerati (2018)
- Precoz – Miranda! (2019)
- ANRMAL – Juana Molina (2020)
- Ya No Mires Atrás – Luis Alberto Spinetta (2020)
- Utopía – Pedro Aznar & Ramiro Gallo (2020)
- Souvenir – Miranda! (2021)
- El Pozo Brillante – Vicentico (2021)
- La Dirección – Conociendo Rusia (2021)
- Oscuro Éxtasis – Wos (2021)
- Trinchera – Babasónicos (2022)
- Cabeza Negra – Julieta Laso (2022)
- Nocturna – Javiera Mena (2022)
- Hotel Miranda! – Miranda! (2023)

== Videography ==
As director

- "Por Siete Vidas (Cacería)" – Fito Páez (1989) (co-directed with Sergio Pérez Fernández)
- "Pulsar" – Gustavo Cerati (1994) (co-directed with Gabriela Malerba)
- "Clap Beat" – Leo García (1999) (co-directed with Cecilia Amenábar)
- "Paraguaya" – Juana Molina (2017)
- "Entre las Dos" – Miranda! featuring Javiera Mena (2020)
- "Gente en la Calle" – Fito Páez & Lali (2021) (co-directed with Guido Adler)
- "Por Amar al Amor" – Miranda! (2021)

== Awards and nominations ==
| Award | Year | Category | Nominated work | Performing artist | Result | Ref. |
|---|---|---|---|---|---|---|
| Latin Grammy Awards | 2009 | Best Recording Package | Cantora 1 | Mercedes Sosa | Won | |
| Latin Grammy Awards | 2011 | Best Recording Package | Solo un Momento | Vicentico | Won | |
| Latin Grammy Awards | 2012 | Best Recording Package | Canciones Para Aliens | Fito Páez | Nominated | |
| Latin Grammy Awards | 2014 | Best Recording Package | Wed 21 | Juana Molina | Won | |
| Latin Grammy Awards | 2023 | Best Recording Package | Hotel Miranda! | Miranda! | Nominated | |
| Latin Grammy Awards | 2023 | Best Recording Package | Nocturna | Javiera Mena | Nominated | |
| Latin Grammy Awards | 2023 | Best Recording Package | Trinchera Avanzada | Babasonicos | Nominated | |
| Premios Gardel | | Best Cover Design | Bocanada | Gustavo Cerati | Won | |
| Premios Gardel | 2001 | Best Cover Design | Hijos del Culo | Bersuit Vergarabat | Nominated | |
| Premios Gardel | 2001 | Best Cover Design | Narigón del Siglo | Divididos | Nominated | |
| Premios Gardel | 2001 | Best Cover Design | Rey Sol | Fito Páez | Nominated | |
| Premios Gardel | 2003 | Best Cover Design | Bajofondo Tango Club | Bajofondo | Nominated | |
| Premios Gardel | 2004 | Best Cover Design | Para los Árboles | Luis Alberto Spinetta | Won | |
| Premios Gardel | 2004 | Best Cover Design | Infame | Babasónicos | Nominated | |
| Premios Gardel | 2005 | Best Cover Design | Los Rayos | Vicentico | Won | |
| Premios Gardel | 2005 | Best Cover Design | La Argentinidad al Palo | Bersuit Vergarabat | Nominated | |
| Premios Gardel | 2005 | Best Cover Design | Mi Vida con Ellas | Fito Páez | Nominated | |
| Premios Gardel | 2005 | Best Cover Design | Camalotus | Luis Alberto Spinetta | Nominated | |
| Premios Gardel | 2006 | Best Cover Design | Testosterona | Bersuit Vergarabat | Nominated | |
| Premios Gardel | 2006 | Best Cover Design | El Mundo Cabe en Una Canción | Fito Páez | Nominated | |
| Premios Gardel | 2006 | Best Cover Design | Son | Juana Molina | Nominated | |
| Premios Gardel | 2009 | Best Cover Design | Un Mañana | Luis Alberto Spinetta | Won | |
| Premios Gardel | 2009 | Best Cover Design | Un día | Juana Molina | Nominated | |
| Premios Gardel | 2012 | Best Cover Design | A Propósito | Babasónicos | Won | |
| Premios Gardel | 2012 | Best Cover Design | Magistral | Miranda! | Nominated | |
| Premios Gardel | 2016 | Best Cover Design | Los Amigo | Luis Alberto Spinetta | Won | |
| Premios Gardel | 2017 | Best Cover Design | Impuesto de Fe | Babasónicos | Won | |
| Premios Gardel | 2018 | Best Cover Design | La Ciudad Liberada | Fito Páez | Nominated | |
| Premios Gardel | 2018 | Best Cover Design | Fuerte | Miranda! | Nominated | |
| Premios Gardel | 2019 | Best Cover Design | Satélite Cerati | Gustavo Cerati | Nominated | |
| Premios Gardel | 2020 | Best Cover Design | Utopía | Pedro Aznar & Ramiro Gallo | Nominated | |
| Premios Gardel | 2020 | Best Cover Design | Precoz | Miranda! | Nominated | |
| Premios Gardel | 2022 | Best Cover Design | La Dirección | Conociendo Rusia | Won | |
| Premios Gardel | 2022 | Best Cover Design | Oscuro Éxtasis | Wos | Nominated | |
| Premios Gardel | 2023 | Best Cover Design | Cabeza Negra | Julieta Laso | Won | |
| Premios Gardel | 2023 | Best Cover Design | Trinchera Avanzada | Babasónicos | Nominated | |

== See also ==
- List of graphic designers
