= Latin Grammy Award for Producer of the Year =

- Awarded for: extraordinary creativity in record production
- Country: United States
- Presented by: The Latin Recording Academy
- First award: 2000
- Currently held by: Rafa Arcaute & Federico Vindver; Nico Cotton (2025)
- Website: latingrammy.com

The Latin Grammy Award for Producer of the Year is an honor presented annually at the Latin Grammy Awards, a ceremony that recognizes excellence and creates a wider awareness of cultural diversity and contributions of Latin recording artists, in the United States and internationally. The award is given to a producer whose recordings released during the eligibility period represent extraordinary creativity in the area of record production. Six individual songs, or 51% of the duration of an album, are the minimum for a producer to be eligible. Two or more producers can participate as a team only if they have worked together during the period of eligibility.

The award for Producer of Year was first presented to the Cuban songwriter Emilio Estefan in 2000. In that year Estefan produced the albums Ciego de Amor by Charlie Zaa, El Amor de Mi Tierra by Carlos Vives and the song "Da la Vuelta", performed by Marc Anthony, and was awarded as the first Person of the Year by the Latin Academy of Recording Arts & Sciences. Italian singer-songwriter Laura Pausini became the first female artist to be nominated for this category, for producing her album Entre Tu y Mil Mares. At the 2010 ceremony, joint winners were announced for the first time, when Jorge Calandrelli and Gregg Field were honored for their work on A Time for Love by Cuban trumpeter Arturo Sandoval; they shared the award with Sergio George, who holds the record for the most wins with four accolades, and most nominations with eight. Eduardo Cabra has won three times. Cachorro López has earned seven nominations which resulted in two wins. Gustavo Santaolalla has been nominated six times and received the award in 2005. In 2018, Venezuelan trumpetist Linda Briceño became the first female producer awarded. Since its inception, the award has been presented to musicians originating from Argentina, Colombia, Cuba, Dominican Republic, Peru, Puerto Rico, Spain, the United States, and Venezuela.

== Recipients ==
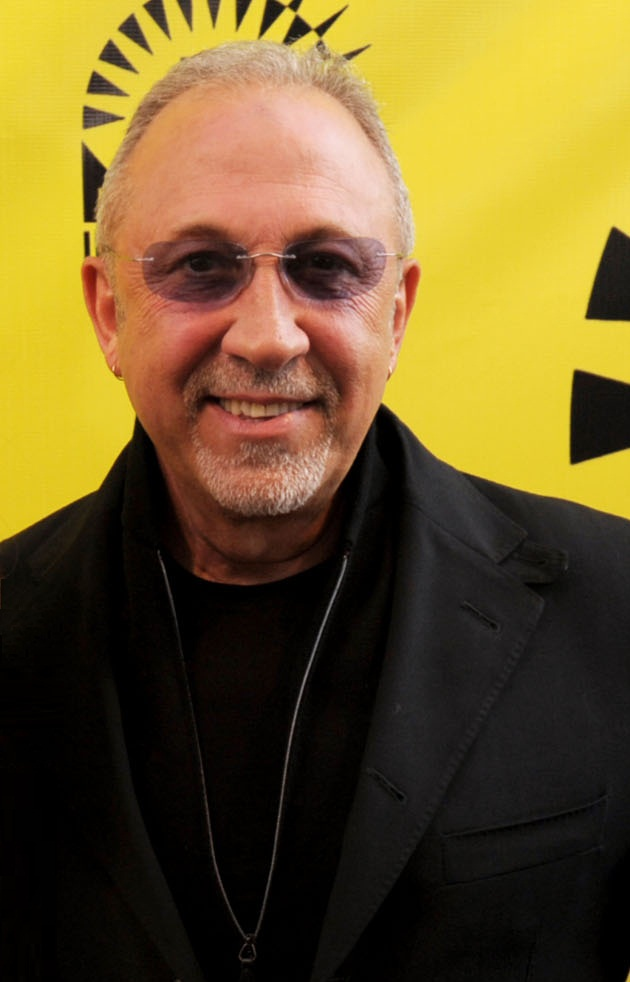
Emilio Estefan, winner at the 1st Latin Grammy Awards.

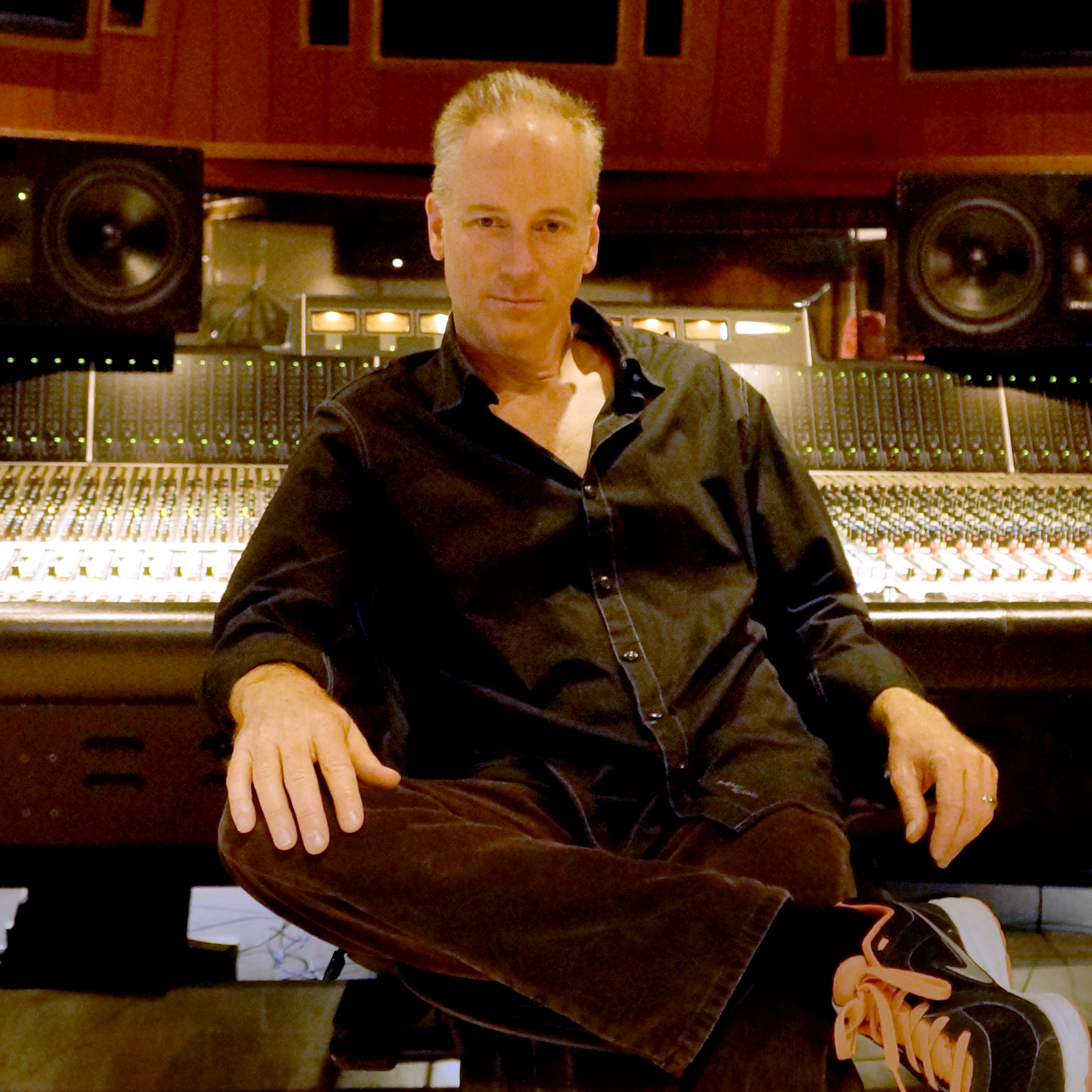
K. C. Porter, winner in 2001.

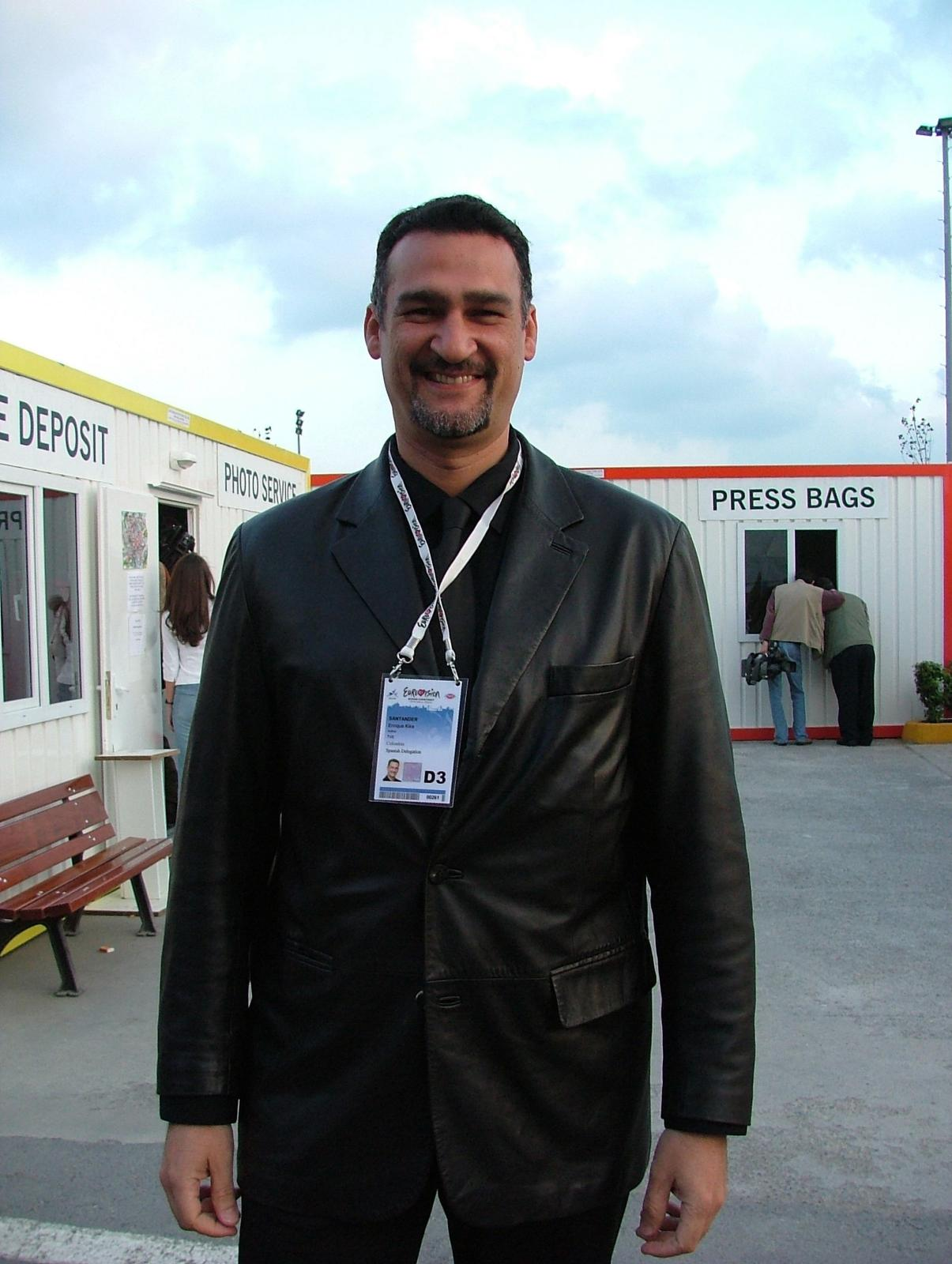
Kike Santander, winner in 2002.

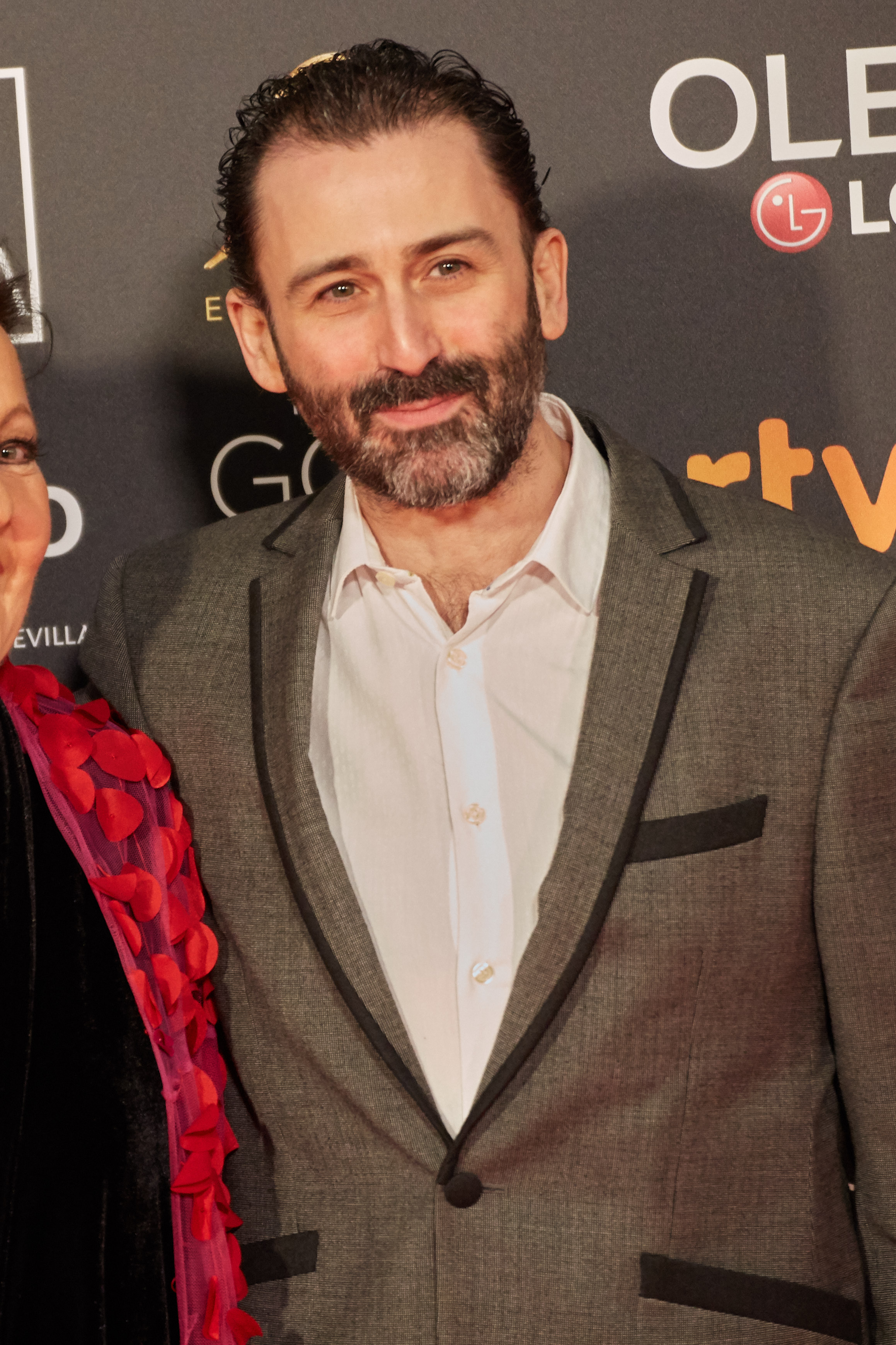
Javier Limón, winner in 2004.

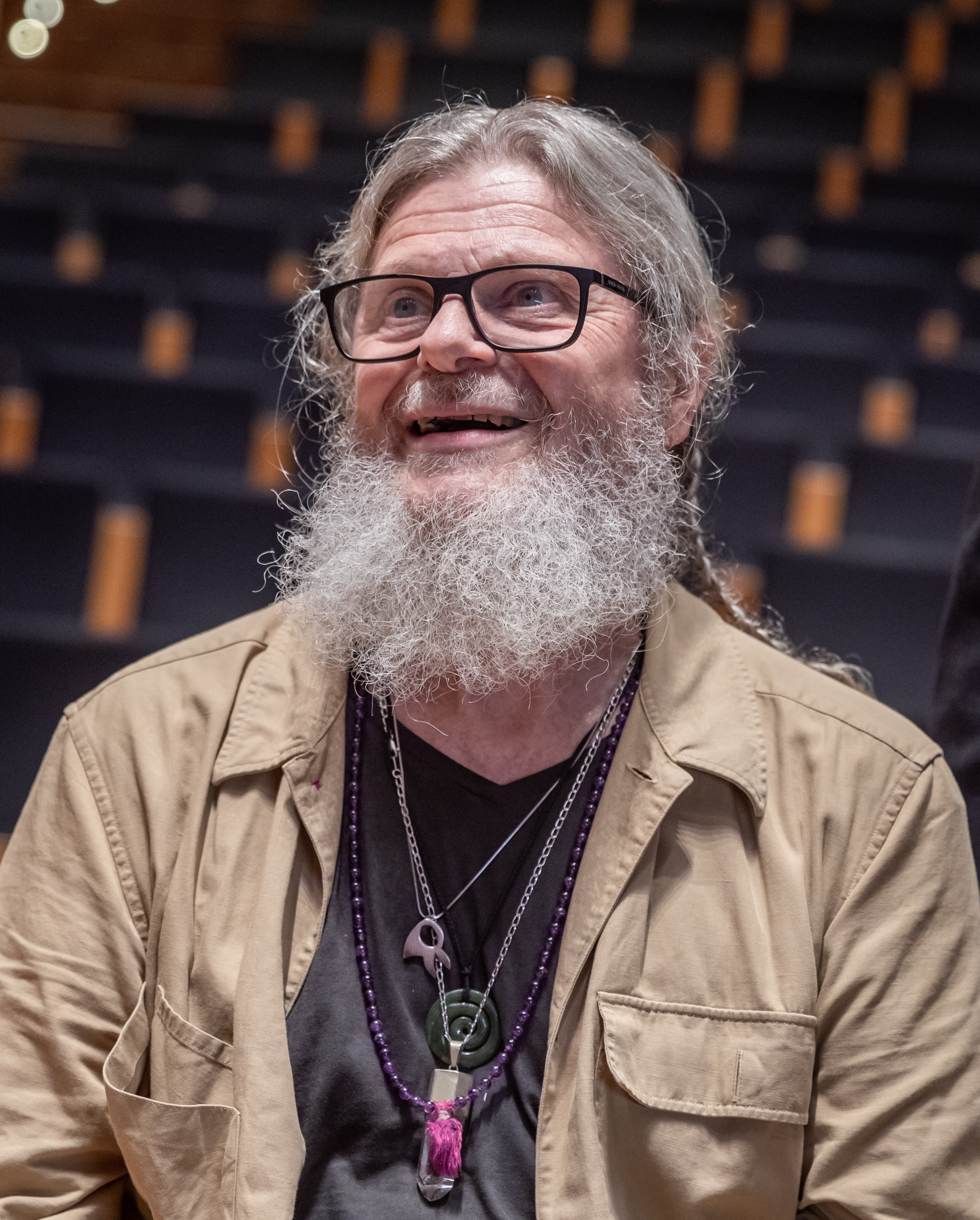
Six-time nominee and 2005 award winner, Gustavo Santaolalla.

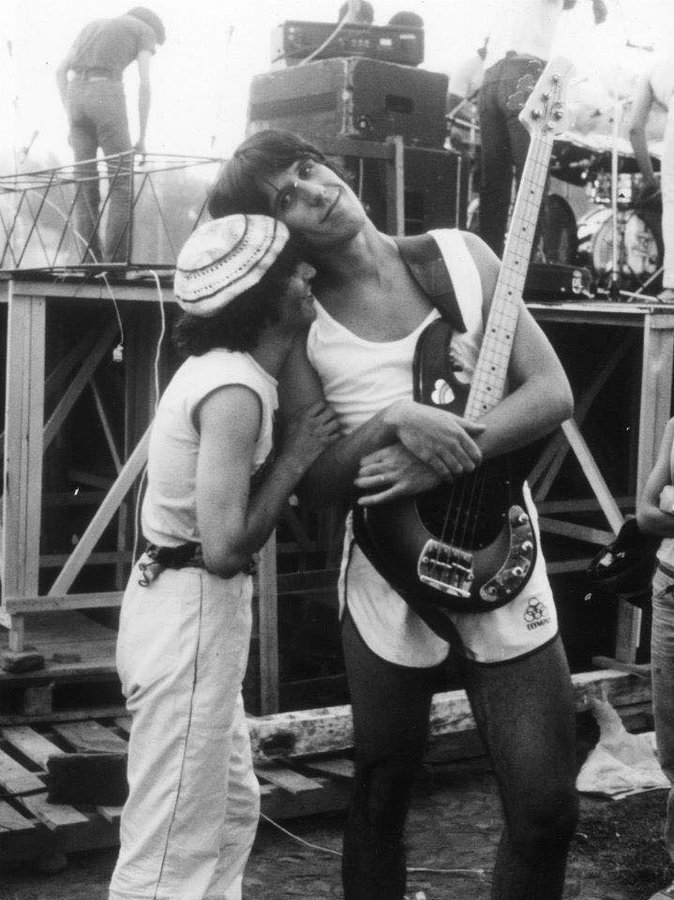
Two-time winner Cachorro López (right), pictured next to Miguel Abuelo. López has won the award in 2006 and 2009.

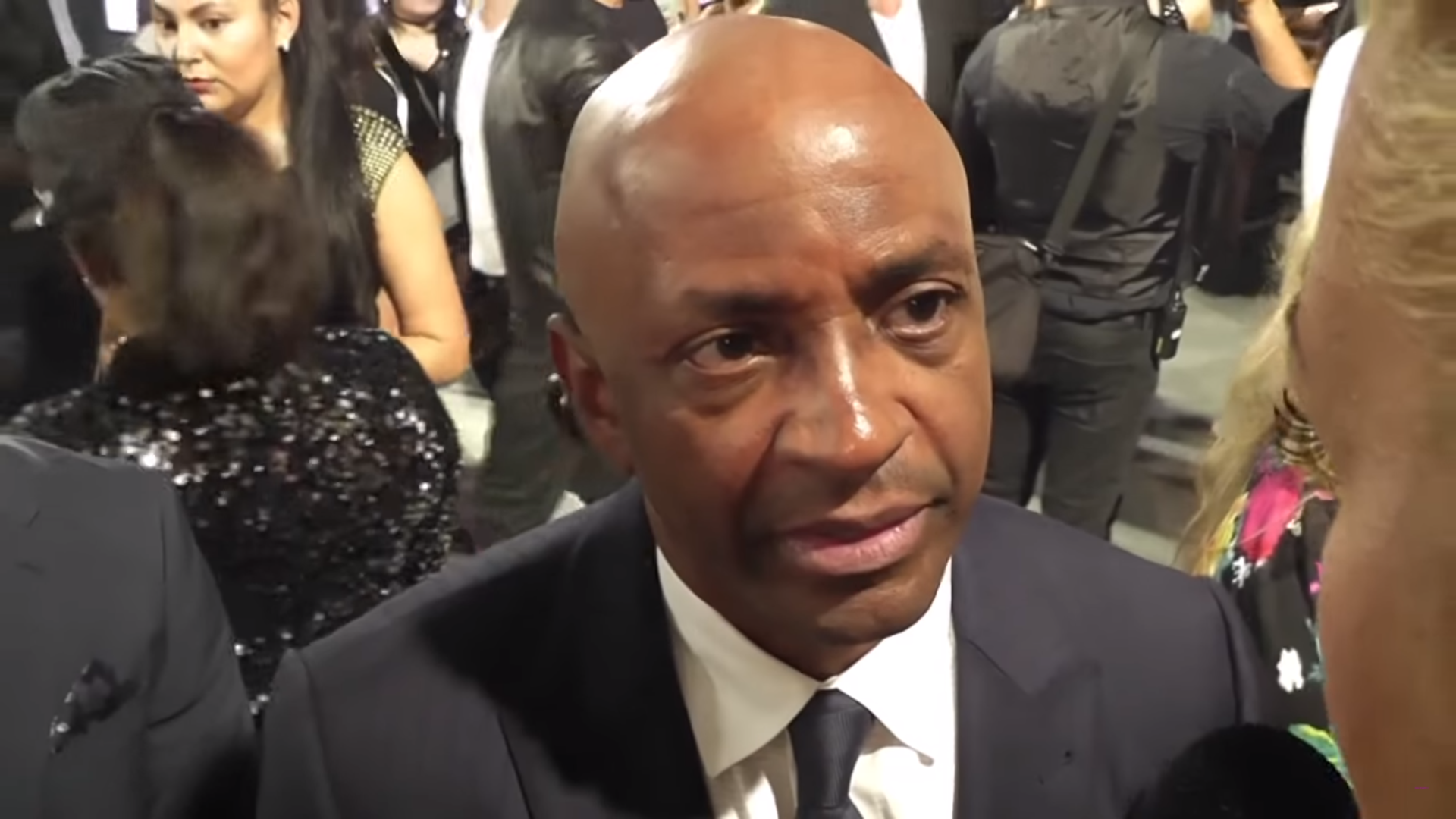
Sergio George, four-time winner in 2008, 2010, 2013, and 2014, and eight-time nominee. He holds the record of most wins and most nominations in the category.

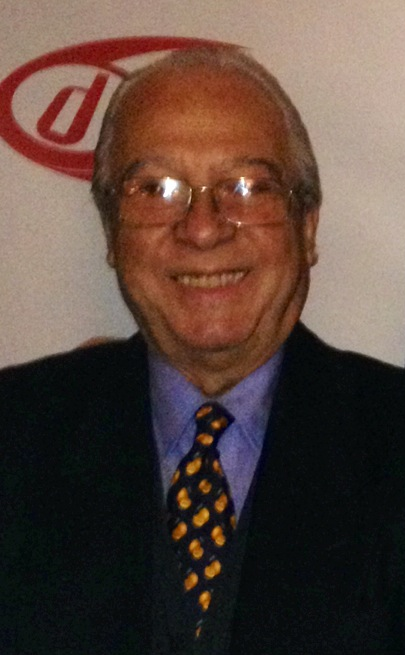
Jorge Calandrelli (pictured) won alongside Gregg Field in 2010. Calandrelli and Field tied for the award with Sergio George in his second win in the category.

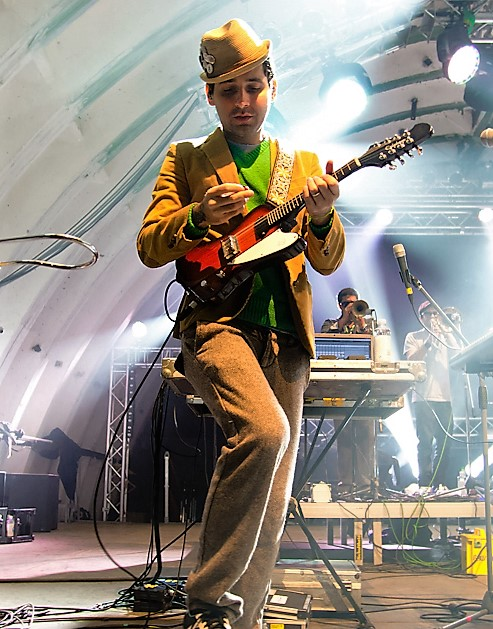
Eduardo Cabra, a three-time winner: in 2011 won as a member of the band Calle 13; and in 2016 and 2017 received the award as a solo record producer.

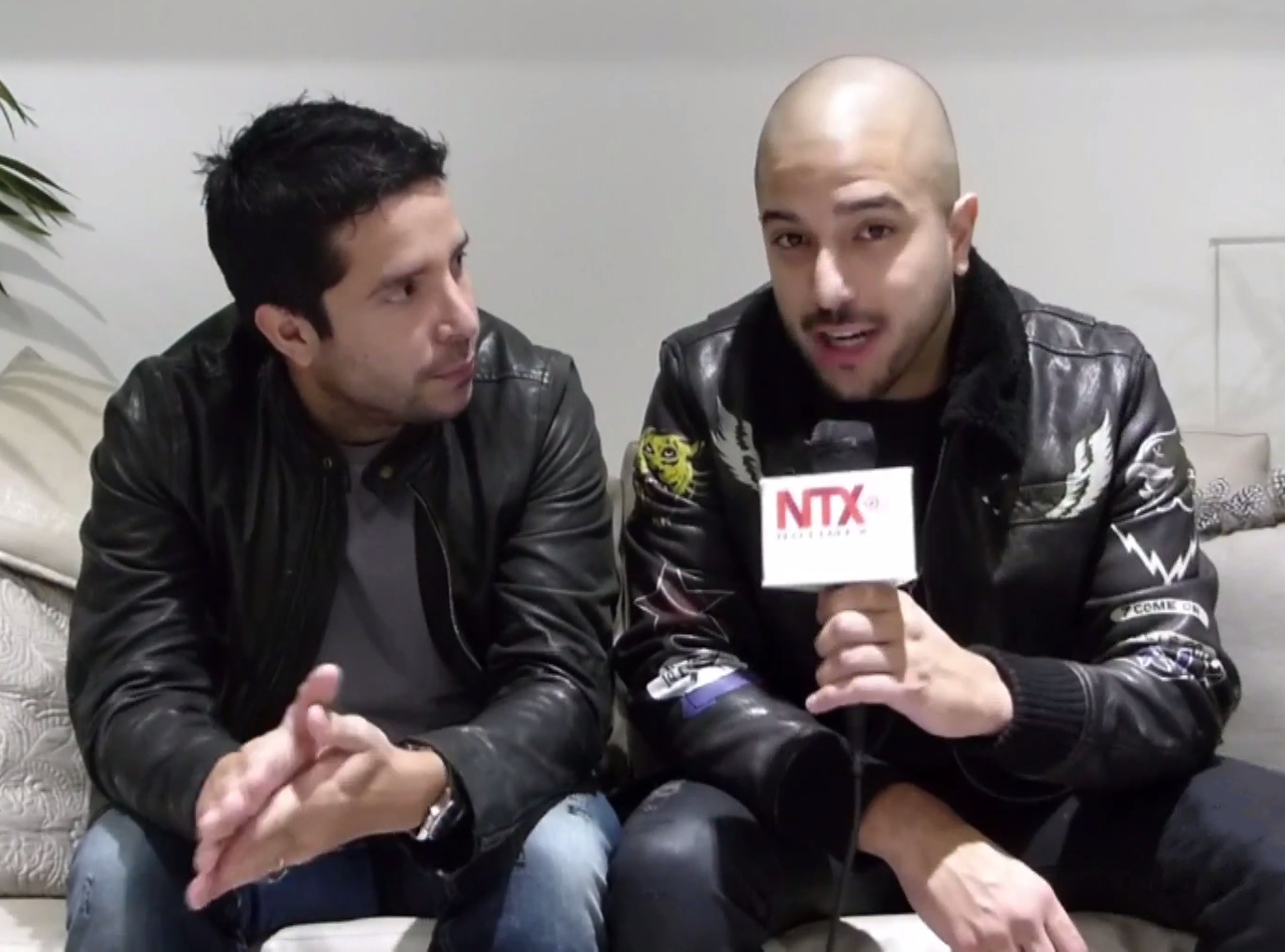
Mauricio Rengifo (left) pictured with Alejandro Rengifo, his brother and fellow member of Cali y El Dandee. Mauricio received the award in 2020 alongside Andrés Torres.

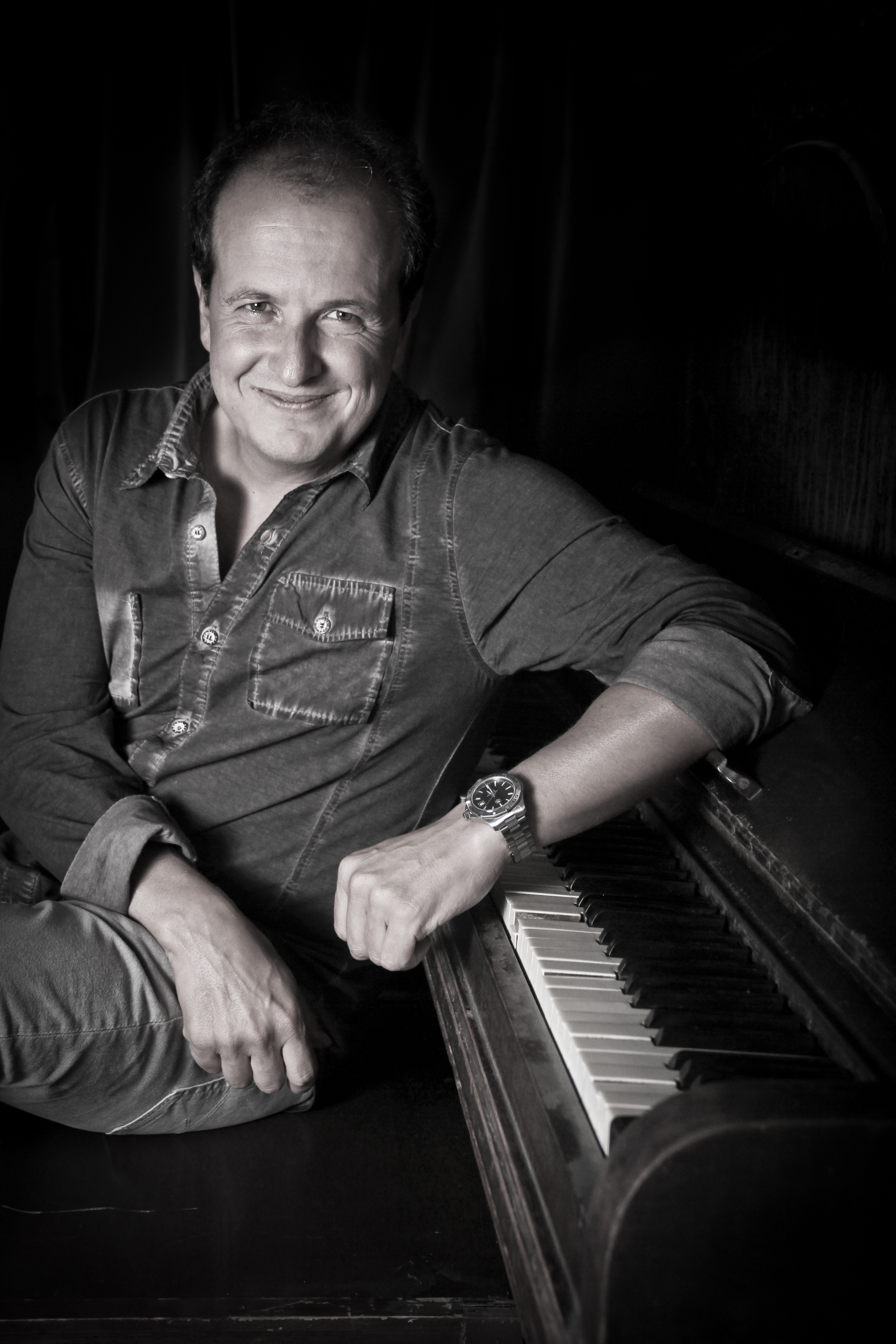
2022 winner Julio Reyes Copello.

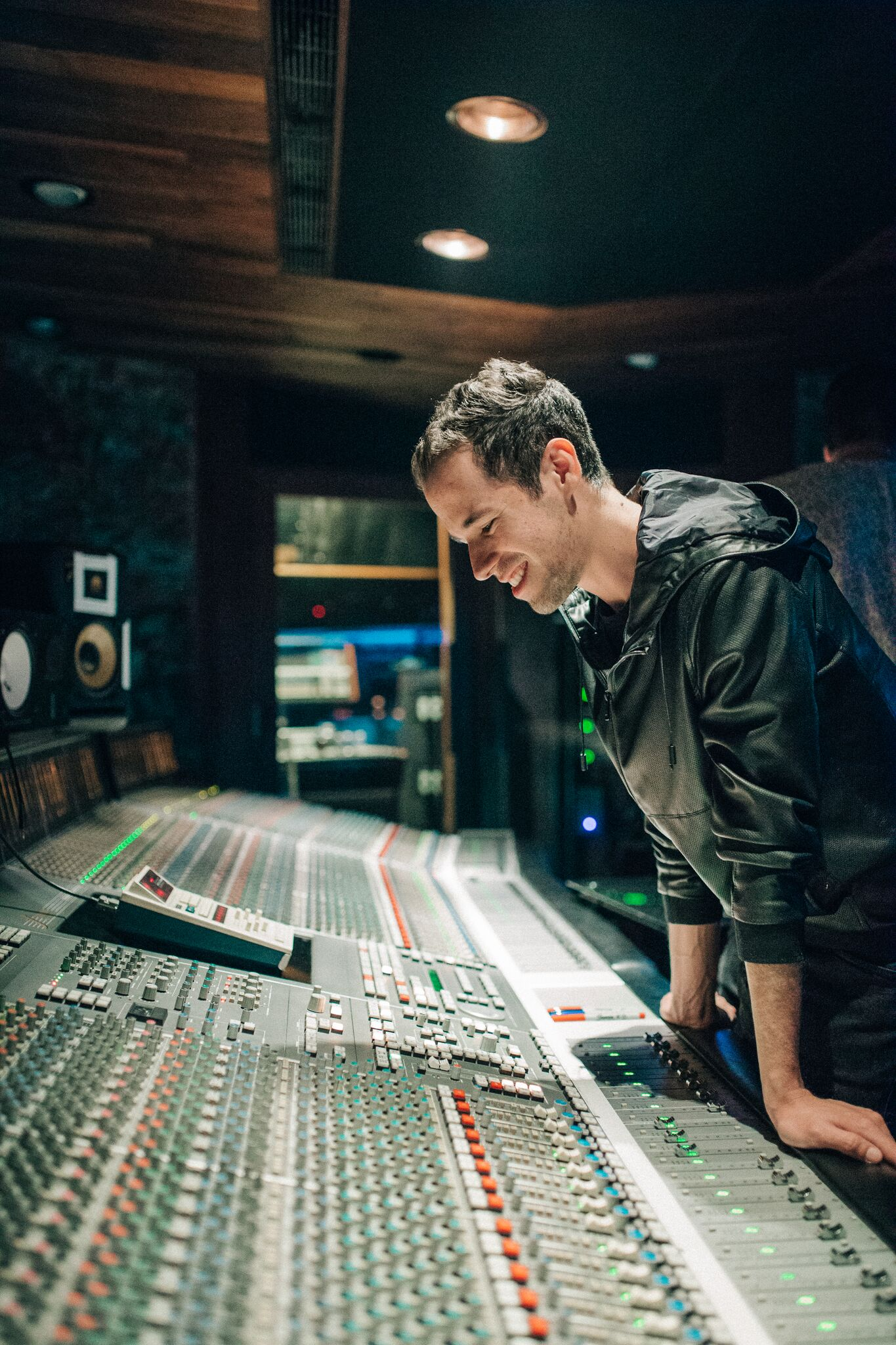
Edgar Barrera has received the award thrice, in 2021, 2023 and 2024. Both in 2023 and 2024, Barrera won both this award and the award for Songwriter of the Year.

Year	Recipient(s) and production credits	Nominees	Ref.
2000	(Cuba) (United States) Emilio Estefan: Ciego de Amor (Charlie Zaa) • "Da la Vuelta" (Marc Anthony) • El Amor de Mi Tierra (Carlos Vives) • Entre Tus Brazos (Alejandro Fernández) • "Santo Santo" (Só Pra Contrariar & Gloria Estefan) • Sol da Liberdade (Daniela Mercury) • Todo lo Que Soy (Carlos Ponce) • Yo Sí Quiero a Mi País (Soledad)	Ry Cooder – Buena Vista Social Club Presents Ibrahim Ferrer (Ibrahim Ferrer); Rudy Pérez – Amar Es un Juego (Millie), "Genie in a Bottle" (Christina Aguilera), Gracias a la Vida (Midón), "Junto a Tí", "Si Esto Es Verdad", "Tú y Yo" (L.A.B.), Llegar a Tí (Jaci Velasquez), Para Estar Contigo (Jaime Camil), "Que Voy a Hacer Sin Ti" (Pablo Montero), "Te Hice Mal" (Los Temerarios); K. C. Porter – Azul (Alan), "Corazón Espinado" (Santana featuring Maná), La Marcha del Golazo Solitario (Los Fabulosos Cadillacs), "Primavera" (Santana), Sola (La India); Caetano Veloso – João Voz e Violão (João Gilberto), Livro, Omaggio A Federico E Giulietta (Veloso)	
2001	(United States) K. C. Porter: "Brujería", "El Santo" (King Changó) • "Cambia la Piel" (Ricky Martin) • "Olympic Festival" (Santana) • "Un Error de los Grandes" (Laura Pausini) • "Una Noche" (98°)	Alfredo Cerruti, Laura Pausini – Entre Tú y Mil Mares (Pausini); Rildo Hora – Água Da Minha Sede (Zeca Pagodinho), Casa De Samba 4 (Various artists); Phil Ramone – Rey Sol (Fito Páez); Gustavo Santaolalla – Amores Perros (Various artists), Fijate Bien (Juanes), Hijos del Culo (Bersuit Vergarabat)	
2002	(Colombia) (United States) Kike Santander: Azul (Cristian Castro) • "Perdidos en la Noche", "Por Ti Yo Iré", "Que No Me Pierda", "Quisiera", "Si Tu Te Vas", "Soy de la Gente" (Diego Torres) • Una Vez Más (Jaime Camil)	Humberto Gatica – La Taberna del Buda (Café Quijano), MTV Unplugged (Alejandro Sanz), MTV Unplugged (La Ley); Sebastian Krys – "Angelito" (Carlos Baute), "Déjame Entrar" (Carlos Vives), "Everybody" (Los Rabanes), "No Logro Entender", "Retrato" (Gian Marco); Gerónimo Labrada, Jr., X-Alfonso – X-Moré (X-Alfonso); Ana Lourdes Martínez Nodarse – Cambio de Tiempo, "Son Pa' Cantar" (Vocal Sampling)	
2003	(Argentina) (Mexico) Bebu Silvetti: "Hasta Que Vuelvas" (Luis Miguel) • "Quién Da un Peso Por Mis Sueños" (Armando Manzanero & Alex Lora) • Rocío Dúrcal... En Concierto Inolvidable (Rocío Dúrcal) • Suma (Ricardo Montaner)	Sergio George – "Buena", "Mi Primer Millón" (Bacilos), Inesperado (Frankie Negrón), Muy Agradecido (Tito Nieves); Guto Graça Mello – Feminino (Simone), MTV RPM 2002 (RPM), Pietá (Milton Nascimento), Um Barzinho, Um Violão 2 - Ao Vivo (Various artists); Luis F. Ochoa – Caraluna, "Caraluna" (Bacilos); Gustavo Santaolalla – Bajofondo Tango Club (Bajofondo), Chapusongs (Árbol), Dance and Dense Denso (Molotov), "Déjate Caer" (Café Tacuba), Nuevo (Kronos Quartet), Un Día Normal (Juanes)	
2004	(Spain) Javier Limón: Cositas Buenas (Paco de Lucía) • El Cantante (Andrés Calamaro) • El Pequeño Reloj (Enrique Morente) • Lágrimas Negras (Bebo Valdés & Diego El Cigala) • Niño Josele (Niño Josele) • Tributo Flamenco a Don Juan Valderrama (Various Artists)	Claudia Brant, Gen Rubin – DJ Kane (DJ Kane); Tom Capone – Cosmotron (Skank), Maria Rita (Maria Rita), O Silêncio Q Precede O Esporro (O Rappa), Sobre Nós 2 e O Resto Do Mundo (Frejat); Sebastian Krys – Confesiones (Obie Bermúdez), "Hoy", "Te Amaré" (Gloria Estefan), "Resucitar" (Gian Marco); Gustavo Santaolalla – Cuatro Caminos (Café Tacuba), La Argentinidad al Palo (Bersuit Vergarabat)	
2005	(Argentina) Gustavo Santaolalla: A Contraluz (La Vela Puerca) • Bajofondo Tango Club Presenta A: Supervielle (Supervielle) • Celador de Sueños (Orozco - Barrientos) • Cristobal Repetto (Cristobal Repetto) • Guau! (Árbol) • Mi Sangre (Juanes) • The Motorcycle Diaries: Original Motion Picture Soundtrack (Santaolalla) • 13 (Javier García)	Paco de Lucía – Tú, Ven a Mi (La Tana); Sergio George – Amanecer Contigo, "Todo Es Mentira" (Frankie Negrón), Fabricando Fantasías, "Ya No Queda Nada" (Tito Nieves), "La Gorda Linda (Versión Original)" (Arthur Hanlon & Tito Nieves), "Ven, Devórame Otra Vez" (Charlie Cruz); Sebastian Krys – El Otro Lado de Mi (Soraya), El Rock de Mi Pueblo (Carlos Vives), Imperfecta-Imperfect (JD Natasha), Mi Forma de Ser (Patricia Loaiza), Resucitar (Gian Marco), Todo el Año (Obie Bermúdez); Afo Verde – Los Rayos (Vicentico), MTV Unplugged (Diego Torres)	
2006	(Argentina) Cachorro López: Días Felices (Christian Castro) • Diego (Diego) • Dulce Beat (Belanova) • Limón y Sal (Julieta Venegas) • Vanessa Colaiutta (Vanessa Colaiutta)	Cesar Camargo Mariano – Hoje (Gal Costa); Moogie Canazio – Arquitetura Da Flor (Francis Hime), Pra Você (Margareth Menezes), Que Falta Você Me Faz (Maria Bethânia), Simone - Ao Vivo (Simone); Lenine, Maria Rita – Segundo (Rita); Gustavo Santaolalla – Café de los Maestros (Café de los Maestros), Flor (Flor), Javier Casalla (Javier Casalla), Testosterona (Bersuit Vergarabat)	
2007	(Argentina) (United States) Sebastian Krys: "Ahora" (Jeremías) • "Amanecer Sin Ti", "Amar Es Lo Que Quiero", (David Bisbal) • Daniela Guzmán (Daniela Guzmán) • Dicen Que El Tiempo (Jennifer Peña) • "La Vida" (Los Rabanes) • Lo Que Trajo El Barco (Obie Bermúdez) • "No Lo Digas Mas", "Tu Amor" (Luis Fonsi) • "Soldado de Papel" (Bisbal & Tomatito)	Benny Faccone – Allá en el Sur (Ilona), La Rueda Del Diablo (La Gusana Ciega), Solo Paz (Porpartes); Carlos Jean – "Amante Bandido" (Miguel Bosé & Alaska), "Como un Lobo" (Bosé & Bimba Bosé), Faltan Lunas (Fey), "Hay Días" (Bosé & Alejandro Sanz), Miss Sánchez (Marta Sánchez), "Nena" (Bosé & Paulina Rubio), "Si Tú No Vuelves" (Bosé & Shakira); Cachorro López – "Ayúdame", "Ni una Sola Palabra", "Que Me Voy a Quedar", "Retrato", "Sin Final" (Paulina Rubio), El Disco de Tu Corazón (Miranda!), Diego(+D) Más (Diego); Phil Vinall, Zoé – Memo Rex Commander y el Corazón Atómico de la Vía Láctea (Zoé)	
2008	(United States) Sergio George: El Cantante (Marc Anthony) • "Historia de Taxi" (Ricardo Arjona & Anthony) • "La Vida Se Va" (Gloria Trevi) • "Mi Mayor Sacrificio" (Tito Nieves & Marco Antonio Solis) • "Quiero Decirte Que Te Amo" (Dark Latin Groove & Ness) • "Toro Mata" (Dark Latin Groove, Napoles & Ness)	Alejandro Acosta, Bob Benozzo, Roberto Cantero – Con Otro Aire (Chambao); Tweety González, Ximena Sariñana – Mediocre, "No Vuelvo Más", "Pocas Palabras", "Reforma", "Un Error", "Vidas Paralelas" (Sariñana); Javier Limón – "La Falsa Moneda", Niña de Fuego (Buika), La Felicidad (Sole Giménez), Terra (Mariza); Cachorro López – Cuando No Estás (Valeria Gastaldi), Fantasía Pop (Belanova), La Lengua Popular (Andrés Calamaro), "Noa Noa" (Vicentico)	
2009	(Argentina) Cachorro López: "Amanecí Sin Ti", "Causa y Efecto", "Corazón", "Ni Rosas Ni Juguetes", "Ya Fué" (Paulina Rubio) • Calle Ilusión (Álex Ubago) • "Chicas", "Mi Propia Vida" (Miranda!) • "El Gran Desfile", "Groovy Vampire", "La Vieja Llama" (Los Pericos) • Inercia (Manuel Carrasco) • "Mentiras" (Los Amigos Invisibles) • Un Día Más (Reik)	Aureo Baqueiro – Miedo Escénico, "El Cínico", "Háblame", "Un Minuto de Silencio", "Vuelvo" (Beto Cuevas), Elemental (Yahir), "Eres Agua" (Aleks Syntek), Nada Es Normal (Victor & Leo), "Volverte A Ver" (Chenoa); Sergio George – Ciclos (Luis Enrique); J. Jiménez "Chaboli" – Esperando Verte (Niña Pastori); José Lugo – Así Soy (Issac Delgado), Guasábara (José Lugo Orchestra)	
2010	(Argentina) Jorge Calandrelli & (United States) Gregg Field: A Time for Love (Arturo Sandoval)	Rafael Arcaute, Diego Torres – Distinto (Torres); Noel Pastor – Black Flamenco (Estrella); Julio Reyes Copello – Amar & Amar (Florent Pagny), "De Nada Sirve Hablar" (Alejandro Fernández), Iconos (Marc Anthony), "Me Enamoré De Ti", "Me Pierdo Contigo", "Si No Estás" (Chayanne)	
2010	(United States) Sergio George: "Corazón Sin Cara", "Stand By Me", "Tú y Yo" (Prince Royce) • "Estúpida", "Si Él Te Habla De Mi", "Smile", "Te Vas a Arrepentir" (La India)	Rafael Arcaute, Diego Torres – Distinto (Torres); Noel Pastor – Black Flamenco (Estrella); Julio Reyes Copello – Amar & Amar (Florent Pagny), "De Nada Sirve Hablar" (Alejandro Fernández), Iconos (Marc Anthony), "Me Enamoré De Ti", "Me Pierdo Contigo", "Si No Estás" (Chayanne)	
2011	(Argentina) Rafael Arcaute (Puerto Rico) Calle 13: Entren Los Que Quieran (Calle 13)	Aureo Baqueiro – A Tiempo (Ha*Ash), Afortunadamente No Eres Tú (Paty Cantú), Alex, Jorge y Lena (Alex, Jorge y Lena), Dos Mundos Revolución en Vivo (Alejandro Fernández), La Marcha de la Vida (Benny Ibarra), Tú (Leonel García); Desmond Child – Música + Alma + Sexo (Ricky Martin); Isidro Infante – Salsa: Un Homenaje a El Gran Combo (Various artists); Gustavo Santaolalla – De Noche (Antonio Carmona), Entre la Ciudad y el Mar (Gustavo Galindo), Rêverie (Supervielle)	
2012	(Dominican Republic) Juan Luis Guerra: MTV Unplugged (Juanes)	Moogie Canazio – Umbigobunker!? (Jay Vaquer); Gregg Field, Arturo Sandoval – Dear Diz (Every Day I Think of You) (Sandoval); Sergio George – Phase II (Prince Royce), Soy y Seré (Luis Enrique), "Will U Still Love Me Tomorrow" (Leslie Grace); Martin Terefe – ¿Con Quién Se Queda el Perro? (Jesse & Joy)	
2013	(United States) Sergio George: Amor Total, "Lejos", "Todo Mi Amor Eres Tu" (Toby Love) • Que Seas Feliz, "Que Seas Feliz", "De Qué Manera Te Olvido" (Tito Nieves) • Leslie Grace (Leslie Grace) • "Mi Linda Princesa" (Jonathan Moly) • "Para Celebrar" (Various artists) • "Sexy Attitude" (5 Solz) • "Te Me Vas" (Prince Royce) • "Vivir Mi Vida" (Marc Anthony)	Rafael Arcaute – Aliados (Aliados), Chances (Illya Kuryaki and the Valderramas); Javier Limón – Flamenco en Black & White (Ariadna Castellanos), Mi Única Llave (José Mercé); Julio Reyes Copello – Encanto del Caribe (Arthur Hanlon & Friends), Kany García (Kany García), La Música No Se Toca (Alejandro Sanz), "Muévelo Tuti" (Duina Del Mar); Dan Warner – 12 Historias (Tommy Torres), EliaCim (EliaCim), "Mojado (Rock Version)" (Ricardo Arjona), Postales (Gaby Moreno)	
2014	(United States) Sergio George: "Deseándote" (Eli Jas & Fito Blanko) • "Nadie Como Tú" (Leslie Grace) • "Piensa En Mí" (Jonathan Moly) • "Se Fué" (Laura Pausini & Marc Anthony) • Sergio George Presents Salsa Giants EP Plus (Various artists) • "Te Viví" (Villamizar featuring Maluma, Elvis Crespo & JDB) • "Toy En Ti" (Magic Juan & Randy Leroy) • 3.0 (Marc Anthony) • "Tu Me Haces Volar" (Eli Jas)	Rafael Arcaute – Ahora Vienen Por Nosotros (Daniela Spalla), Aplaudan en el Luna (Illya Kuryaki and the Valderramas), "Cuando Amas a Alguien" (Noel Schajris & Axel), "Niña Huracán" (Schajris & Dante Spinetta); Eduardo Cabra – Multi_Viral (Calle 13), "Todo Cae" (Jorge Drexler); Andrés Castro – "Bien Sabes Tú" (PeeWee & Río Roma), "Duele Decirte Adiós" (PeeWee), En el Buzón de Tu Corazón (Carlos Baute), "Lejos de Tu Alma", "Quiero Escuchar Tu Voz", "Tan Sólo Pido" (Samo), Más + Corazón Profundo, "No Te Pongas Triste" (Carlos Vives); Moreno Veloso – Gilbertos Samba (Gilberto Gil), Multishow Ao Vivo Caetano Veloso Abraçaço (Caetano Veloso)	
2015	(Argentina) (United States) Sebastian Krys: "Amiga" (Comisario Pantera) • De Lejos (Raida Pita) • El Porvenir (Marlango) • Sirope (Alejandro Sanz)	Mario Adnet, Dori Caymmi – Dorival Caymmi: Centenário Caymmi (Various artists); Aníbal Kerpel, Gustavo Santaolalla – Camino (Santaolalla); George Noriega – Aquila (Pedro Capó), Cama Incendiada (Maná), Primera Fila: Hecho Realidad (Ha*Ash), Te Quiero los Domingos (Raquel Sofia), "Ya Es Muy Tarde" (Yuridia); Kenny O'Brien, Manuel Quijano – Orígenes: El Bolero Volumen 3 (Café Quijano); Andrés Saavedra – "Agridulce" (Raquel Sofía), "Big Bang" (Siam), Espectacular, "Hasta El Sol De Hoy" (Aaron Emanuel), Give Me More (Atellagali), "Instinto Animal" (Aviónica), "Llévame Despacio" (Paulina Goto)	
2016	(Argentina) Rafael Arcaute: "Aniversario" (De La Rivera featuring Emmanuel Horvilleur) • Buena Vida, "La Vida Es Un Vals" (Diego Torres) • "Hoy Es Domingo" (Torres & Rubén Blades) • "Identidad" (Los Huayra) • Reluciente, Rechinante y Aterciopelado (Aterciopelados)	Eduardo Cabra – Nuevo Ciclo (Chambao), Tecnoanimal (Gustavo Cordera); Moogie Canazio – Canções de Exílio (Jay Vaquer), Like Nice (Celso Fonseca); Kim Fanlo – El Mundo y Los Amantes Inocentes (Pablo López); Rafa Sardina – Ginastera: The Vocal Album (Various artists), Rumba a Lo Desconocido, "Nadie Sabe", "Pastillas Para Dormir" (Estopa)	
2017	(Puerto Rico) Eduardo Cabra: A La Mar (Vicente García) • "La Fortuna" (Diana Fuentes & Tommy Torres) • La Lucha (La Vida Bohème) • Sofá (Silvina Moreno) • Somos (Swing Original Monks)	Eduardo Bergallo – "Al Este", "Mona Lisa", "Yo Soy" (Balboa), "El Tesoro", "Madre", "Postales Negras" (Él Mató a un Policía Motorizado), Halo (Juana Molina), La Promesa de Thamar (Sig Ragga), Tanguedia (Gabriela Bergallo); Moogie Canazio – Zanna (Zanna); Hamilton de Holanda, Marcos Portinari, Daniel Santiago – Casa de Bituca (Hamilton de Holanda Quinteto); Armando Manzanero – Armando Manzanero Presenta a Alvera Aquí (Alvera)	
2018	(Venezuela) Linda Briceño: 11 (Linda Briceño featuring Ella Bric & The Hidden Figures) • Segundo Piso (Mv Caldera)	Rafael Arcaute – Ahora O Nunca, "Solo Yo" (La Pegatina), "Así No Se Hace" (Piso 21), "El Hit", "Somos Nosotros" (Emmanuel Horvilleur), "Hace Calor" (Juan Ingaramo), "Laberinto" (Dante Spinetta); Eduardo Cabra – Encanto Tropical (Monsieur Periné), "Este Espíritu" (La Banda Bastön y Sotomayor), Fantasma (La Tortuga China), "La Gravedad" (Diana Fuentes); Andrés Torres, Mauricio Rengifo – "A Partir de Hoy" (David Bisbal & Sebastian Yatra), "Besos en Guerra" (Morat & Juanes), "Cásate Conmigo" (Silvestre Dangond & Nicky Jam), "Échame la Culpa" (Luis Fonsi & Demi Lovato), "La Vida Sin Tí" (Piso 21), "Robarte un Beso" (Carlos Vives & Yatra), "Simples Corazones" (Fonseca), "Sutra" (Yatra & Dalmata), "Te Voy a Amar" (Andrés Cepeda & Cali y El Dandee); Julio Reyes Copello – "Ciudad de Papel" (Malú), "El Valor de Seguir Adelante" (Laura Pausini), "Las Cuentas" (Ana Mena), "Porque Nadie Sabe" (Fonseca & Nahuel Pennisi), Prometo, "Saturno" (Pablo Alborán), Un Canto Nuevo (Juan Antonio Cuéllar & Luis Torres Zuleta)	
2019	(Peru) Tony Succar: "Amante del amor" (Raul Stefano) • "El Alacrán" (Eric Chacón & Tony Succar) • "El Ritmo de Mi Corazón" (Gian Marco featuring Grupo 5 & Succar) • "Imprevisto" (Raices Jazz Orchestra, Pablo Gil & Succar) • Más de Mi (Succar) • "Tonada de Succar" (Eric Chacón & Succar) • "Vai La Vai La" (Succar featuring Marcelo Amaro, Tuti & Nelson Arrieta)	Julio Reyes Copello – "Back in the City" (Alejandro Sanz & Nicky Jam), #ELDISCO, "No Tengo Nada" (Sanz), "Libre" (Diana Fuentes), "Mi Persona Favorita" (Sanz & Camila Cabello), Nostalgia (Daniela Brooker), Oxígeno (Malú), Visceral (Paula Arenas), "Yo Te Extraño" (Sebastián Yatra); Rafael Sardina – Fandango at the Wall: A Soundtrack for the United States, Mexico, and Beyond (Arturo O'Farrill & The Afro Latin Jazz Orchestra), Indestructible (Flor de Toloache), Volver (Plácido Domingo & Pablo Sainz Villegas); Andrés Torres, Mauricio Rengifo – "Ay Corazón" (Cali y El Dandee), Balas Perdidas (Morat), "Cobarde", "Si Tú Te Vas", "Todo En Mi Vida" (Ximena Sariñana), Fantasía (Sebastián Yatra), "La Plata" (Juanes featuring Lalo Ebratt), "Perdón" (David Bisbal & Greeicy), Quiero Volver (Tini), "Serenata" (Mike Bahía), "Suave y Sutil" (Paulina Rubio), "Teléfono (Remix)" (Aitana & Lele Pons), Vida (Luis Fonsi), "Volver A Verte" (Fonseca featuring Cali y El Dandee); Juan Pablo Vega – Conexión (Vega), ¿Dónde Bailarán las Niñas? (Ximena Sariñana), En Medio de Este Ruido (Kurt), "Fuimos Amor" (Esteman), "Sofía" (Mario Bautista), "Vida de Mis Vidas" (Santiago Cruz & Vicente García)	
2020	(Colombia) Andrés Torres (Colombia) Mauricio Rengifo: A Dónde Vamos (Morat) • "Cartagena" (Fonseca & Silvestre Dangond) • Colegio (Cali y El Dandee) • "Falta Amor" (Sebastián Yatra & Ricky Martin) • "Girasoles" (Luis Fonsi) • "Infinito" (Andrés Cepeda & Jesse & Joy) • "+" (Aitana & Cali y El Dandee) • "Mi Otra Mitad" (Manuel Medrano) • "Minifalda" (Greeicy & Juanes) • "Perdiendo la Cabeza" (Carlos Rivera, Becky G & Pedro Capó) • "Recuerdo" (Tini & Mau y Ricky) • "Runaway" (Yatra, Daddy Yankee, Natti Natasha & Jonas Brothers) • "TBT" (Yatra, Rauw Alejandro & Manuel Turizo)	Rafael Arcaute – "Buena" (Manuel Medrano), "BUENOS AIRES", "Business Woman", "Copa Glasé" (Nathy Peluso), "La Mentira" (Dani Martin featuring Joaquín Sabina), "Los Huesos" (Martin & Juanes), "LALIGERA" (Lali), "No Se Perdona" (Rels B & Peluso), "Quiero Vivir" (Draco Rosa), "Tutu (Remix)" (Camilo, Shakira & Pedro Capó); Eduardo Cabra "Visitante" – 2030 (LOUTA), "Fallaste Nostradamus", "Mario Neta", "Que Empiece el Juego", "Tiburones en el Bosque" (El Cuarteto de Nos), "Mi Derriengue" (Riccie Oriach), Orígenes (Sotomayor); Pablo Díaz-Reixa "El Guincho" – "A Palé", "Dio$ No$ Libre del Dinero", "Juro Que" (Rosalía), "Goteo" (Paloma Mami), "Me Quedo" (Aitana & Lola Índigo), "Yalo Yale" (Dellafuente), "Yo x Ti, Tú x Mí" (Rosalía & Ozuna); George Noriega – "Amor y Traición" (Cabas), "Mundo Paralelo" (Monsieur Periné & Pedro Capó), "No Ha Parado de Llover" (Maná & Sebastián Yatra), "No Le Llames Amor" (Yuridia), "No Pienso Volver", "No Vuelvas" (Ednita Nazario), "Puta" (J Mena), "Te Dejo Ir" (Andrés Cepeda), "Vamos a Mi Ritmo" (Lasso & Isabela Souza)	
2021	(Mexico) Edgar Barrera: "Botella Tras Botella" (Christian Nodal & Gera MX) • "100 Años" (Carlos Rivera & Maluma) • "De Vuelta Pa' la Vuelta" (Daddy Yankee & Marc Anthony) • Mis Manos, "Vida de Rico" (Camilo) • "Pa Ti" (Jennifer Lopez & Maluma) • "Poco" (Reik & Nodal) • #7DJ (7 Días en Jamaica) (Maluma)	Alizzz – El Madrileño (C. Tangana); Bizarrap – "Cazzu: Bzrp Music Sessions, Vol. 32" (Bizarrap & Cazzu), "Khea: Bzrp Music Sessions, Vol. 34" (Bizarrap & Khea), "L-Gante: Bzrp Music Sessions, Vol. 38" (Bizarrap & L-Gante), "Nathy Peluso: Bzrp Music Sessions, Vol. 36" (Bizarrap & Nathy Peluso), "Ysy A: Bzrp Music Sessions, Vol. 37" (Bizarrap & Ysy A), "Zaramay: Bzrp Music Sessions, Vol. 31" (Bizarrap & Zaramay); Marcos Sánchez – Amor y Punto (Manolo Ramos); Dan Warner – Blanco (Ricardo Arjona)	
2022	(Colombia) Julio Reyes Copello: "Besos En La Frente" (Fonseca) • "Carne y Oro" (Cami & Art House) • "Cuantas Veces" (Carlos Rivera & Reik) • Koati Original Soundtrack (Various artists) • "Los Rotos" (Ela Taubert) • "Nada Particular" (Miguel Bosé & Rivera) • Pa'llá Voy (Marc Anthony) • "Parte de Mi" (Nicki Nicole) • "Puro Sentimiento" (Alejandro Lerner & Carlos Santana) • "Quererte Bonito" (Sebastián Yatra & Elena Rose) • "Se Nos Rompio El Amor" (David Bisbal)	Édgar Barrera – "Cada Quien" (Grupo Firme & Maluma), "Indigo" (Camilo & Evaluna Montaner), "Kesi Remix" (Camilo & Shawn Mendes), "999" (Selena Gomez & Camilo), "Pegao", "Pesadilla" (Camilo), "Sobrio" (Maluma); Eduardo Cabra – "Atravesao" (Elsa y Elmar), "El Arca de Mima" (Mima), "Fiesta En Lo Del Dr. Hermes", "La Ciudad Sin Alma" (El Cuarteto de Nos), Hermes Croatto, "Respiro Perdon" (Hermes Croatto), "Mañosa" (Canina); Nico Cotton – La Dirección, "El Enemigo" (Conociendo Rusia), "Loco" (Tiago PZK), Nena Trampa, "Sobre Mi Tumba" (Cazzu), "Primavera", "Último y Primero", "Vuelve" (Elsa y Elmar); Tainy – "Candy" (Rosalía), "¿Cuándo Fue?" (Rauw Alejandro & Tainy), "Desenfocao'" (Rauw Alejandro), "En Mi Cuarto" (Jhayco & Skrillex), "In Da Getto" (J Balvin & Skillex), "La Fama" (Rosalía & The Weeknd), "Lo Siento BB:/" (Tainy, Bad Bunny & Julieta Venegas), "X Última Vez" (Daddy Yankee & Bad Bunny), "Yonaguni" (Bad Bunny)	
2023	(United States) Edgar Barrera: "Ambulancia" (Camilo & Camila Cabello) • "Bebe Dame" (Fuerza Regida & Grupo Frontera) • "El Merengue" (Marshmello & Manuel Turizo) • "Gucci Los Paños" (Karol G) • "La Bachata" (Manuel Turizo) • "La Fórmula" (Maluma & Marc Anthony) • "Me Extraño" (Romeo Santos & Christian Nodal) • "Nasa" (Camilo & Alejandro Sanz) • "Pa Quererte" (Rels B) • "Por el Resto de Tu Vida" (Christian Nodal & Tini) • "Que Vuelvas" (Carin León & Grupo Frontera) • "Un x100to" (Grupo Frontera & Bad Bunny) • Una Copa Por Cada Reina (Deluxe) (Nathan Galante)	Bizarrap – "Arcángel: Bzrp Music Sessions, Vol. 54" (Bizarrap & Arcángel), "Bottas" (Arcángel, Duki & Bizarrap), "Duki: Bzrp Music Sessions, Vol. 50" (Bizarrap & Duki), "Quevedo: Bzrp Music Sessions, Vol. 52" (Bizarrap & Quevedo), "Shakira: Bzrp Music Sessions, Vol. 53" (Bizarrap & Shakira), "Villano Antillano: Bzrp Music Sessions, Vol. 51" (Bizarrap & Villano Antillano); Eduardo Cabra – "Barriletes" (Los Caligaris), El Día Antes del Día (Sie7e), "Flan" (El Cuarteto de Nos), Galería (Rafa Pabón), Martínez (Cabra), "MÁS ANIMAL" (Rodrigo Cuevas featuring iLe), "Niños Dorados" (Cami), Salitre (Seba Otero), Selva (Silvina Moreno); Nico Cotton – "Brinca" (Cazzu & Young Miko), "El Merengue" (Marshmello & Manuel Turizo), "Flores" (Daniela Spalla), "Jaula de Oro" (Leiva & Conociendo Rusia), "La La" (Marilina Bertoldi), La Nena de Argentina (Maria Becerra), "Las Flores Sangran", "Nena, Dime Algo", "Nuevo Comienzo" (Usted Señalemelo), Natural (Soledad), "Peli-Culeo (Remix)" (Cazzu, De La Ghetto, Randy, Ñengo Flow & Justin Quiles); Julio Reyes Copello – "De Penita y Rabia" (Cami), "El Cuerpo Que Habito" (Agris), "Los Mejores Años" (Joaquina), "Miracle" (Riza), Sincerándome Disco 1 (Carlos Rivera); Marcos Sánchez – "A Ciegas" (Paula Arenas), "La Fiesta De Mi Calle", "Mala Mía, Me Fui" (Manolo Ramos), Que Me Duela, "Solamente Estás Tu" (Camilú)	
2024	(United States) Edgar Barrera: "Cosas de la Peda" (Prince Royce featuring Gabito Ballesteros), "Cuando la Vida Sea Trago" (Carin León), "Difícil Tu Caso" (Alejandro Fernández), "El Jefe" (Shakira & Fuerza Regida), Esquinas (Becky G), Jugando a Que No Pasa Nada (Grupo Frontera), "Me Gusta Tu Flow" (Arcángel), "Mi Ex Tenía Razón" (Karol G), Obsessed Pt. 2 (Yahritza y Su Esencia), "Según Quién" (Maluma & Carin León)	Eduardo Cabra – Alkemi (Daymé Arocena), "Bachaqué" (Mima), Esta Vida Que Elegí (St. Pedro), "Guarapo y Flor" (Seba Otero & Bebo Dumont), "Malabar" (Seba Otero featuring Irepelusa), Manual de Romería (Rodrigo Cuevas), "Miel" (Rawayana, Rafa Pabön & Cabra); Nico Cotton – "Atelier" (Chita), "Diamante" (Louta & Elsa y Elmar), "Faltas Tú" (Morat), Jet Love (Conociendo Rusia), "La Carta" (Daniela Spalla), "La Vivida Noche", "X Siempre" (Usted Señálemelo), "Pelo Suelto" (Elsa y Elmar & Conociendo Rusia), "Siempre Que Lo Beso" (Miranda! & Kenia Os), "Un Día" (Lara91k & Julieta Venegas); Juan Luis Guerra & Janina Rosado – Capitán Avispa (Original Motion Picture Soundtrack), Radio Güira (Juan Luis Guerra 4.40); Julio Reyes Copello – "A La Mitad" (Maura Nava), "Aún Me Sigo Encontrando" (Gian Marco & Rubén Blades), "Fuego de Noche, Nieve de Día" (Ricky Martin & Christian Nodal), "Los Sueños de Tu Vida" (Gian Marco & Silvio Rodríguez), "Nacimos Solos" (Juanes), "Perderme" (Morat), "Quise Quererte" (Joaquina), "Se Te Va a Olvidar" (Agris), "Si Me Llevas Contigo" (Carin León featuring Keith Urban & Rosario), "Vale la Pena" (Laura Pausini)	
2025	(Argentina) Rafa Arcaute & Federico Vindver: "El Día del Amigo", "Impostor", "Re Forro", "#Tetas" (Ca7riel & Paco Amoroso), "La Noche de Tu Amor", "Los Ejes de Mi Carreta (ATGGT & Victoria May)	Edgar Barrera – "Ángel" (Grupo Frontera & Romeo Santos), "El Amigo" (Christian Nodal), Mala Mía (Fuerza Regida & Grupo Frontera), "Me Retiro" (Santana & Grupo Frontera), "Milagros" (Karol G), "Si Antes Te Hubiera Conocido" (Karol G), "Si Tú Me Vieras" (Carín León & Maluma), "Siento (Virgo)" (Bomba Estéreo & Rawayana), "Vino Tinto" (Peso Pluma, Natanael Cano & Gabito Ballesteros); Andrés Torres & Mauricio Rengifo – Bogotá (Andrés Cepeda), "Carita Triste" (Ana Mena & Emilia), "La Colombiana" (Juliana), "La Reina" (Lola Índigo), "Los Años" (La Santa Cecilia), "Me Toca a Mí" (Morat & Camilo), Milagro (Sebastián Yatra), "6 de Febrero" (Aitana), "Una Flor" (Andrés Cepeda & Manuel Medrano), Ya Es Mañana (Morat); Matheus Stiirmer – Enquanto Os Distraídos Amam (Pedro Emílio), Profano (Gabriel Nandes), "Segredo Clichê" (Giana), Veraneio (Veraneio)	
2025	(Argentina) Nico Cotton: "Agridulce" (Bhavi & Duki), "Carne Viva" (Blair featuring Dillom), Cuarto Azul (Aitana), "Desastres Fabulosos" (Jorge Drexler & Conociendo Rusia), Latinaje (Cazzu), "Museo del Prado" (Manuel Carrasco), "Perfecto Final" (Conociendo Rusia & Nathy Peluso), "Una Noche Contigo" (Juanes), "Ya Es Mañana" (Morat)		

^{^[I]} Each year is linked to the article about the Latin Grammy Awards held that year.

== See also ==
- Billboard Latin Music Award for Producer of the Year
- Grammy Award for Producer of the Year
