= Latin Grammy Award for Best Recording Package =

- Awarded for: Recording package design
- Country: United States
- Presented by: The Latin Recording Academy
- First award: 2006
- Currently held by: Aitana, Christian Molina, Miguel Torán & Isabel Vicente for Cuarto azul (2025)
- Website: Latingrammy.com

The Latin Grammy Award for Best Recording Package is an honor presented annually at the Latin Grammy Awards, a ceremony that recognizes excellence and promotes awareness of cultural diversity and contributions of Latin recording artists in the United States and internationally. It was first awarded at the 7th Annual Latin Grammy Awards in 2006.

The description of the category at the 2020 Latin Grammy Awards states that is "for graphic design, quality and concept recording packages, in any configuration, released for the first time during the Eligibility Year; even if contents were previously released and providing the packaging is new. Only original artwork is eligible. Also eligible are digital recording packages providing proper credits and supporting material are received." The award goes to the art director(s) and not to the performing artist unless they are also credited as an art director for the album.

Argentine graphic designer Alejandro Ros holds the record of most wins in the category with three times for his work in albums by Argentine singers Mercedes Sosa, Vicentico and Juana Molina.

== Recipients ==
Year	Recipient(s)	Work	Performing artist(s)	Nominees	Ref.
2006	Laura Varsky	Café de los Maestros	Various Artists	Alexandra Lahr – Live In Los Angeles (Los Pinguos); Omar Delgado – Productos Desaparecidos (La Pestilencia); Marcelo Kertész – Samba Passarinho (Péri); Fritz Torres and Jorge Verdin – Tijuana Sessions Vol. 3 (Nortec Collective); Edward Martínez – Timeless (Sérgio Mendes)	
2007	Catalina Díez	Los Vallenatos de Andrés	Various Artists	Luciano Cury – Mutantes Ao Vivo - Barbican Theatre, Londres 2006 (Mutantes); Gringo Cardia – Biograffiti (Rita Lee); Andrea Bardasano – Edición Especial (Motel); Allan Castañeda & Sandra Masias – Serenata Inkaterra (Jean Pierre Magnet)	
2008	Leicia Gotlibowski, Daniel Kotliar, Karina Levy, Andres Mayo & Mercedes Sencio	Buenos Aires, Días y Noches de Tango	Various Artists	Santiago Velazco-Land – Cara B (Jorge Drexler); Jorge Du Peixe & Valentina Trajano – Fome de Tudo (Nação Zumbi); Gaspar Guerra – Gózalo (Orquesta La 33); Fritz Torres – Tijuana Sound Machine (Bostich and Fussible)	
2009	Alejandro Ros	Cantora 1	Mercedes Sosa	Rubén Scaramuzzino – Andrés: Obras Incompletas (Andrés Calamaro); 7Potencias.Net – Aocaná (Ojos de Brujo); Juan Gatti – Bosegrafía (Miguel Bosé); Jesús Sarabia – Dramas Y Caballeros (Luis Ramiro)	
2010	Rock Instrument Bureau	Fuerza natural	Gustavo Cerati	Luis Itanare – Casa 4 (Famasloop); Boa Mistura – En El Fin Del Mundo (Chambao); Pico Covarrubias – Hombre Invisible (Ely Guerra); Locktite – Work In Progress (Erizonte)	
2011	Javier Mariscal	Chico & Rita	Various Artists	Natalia Ayala, Carlos Dussan Gomez & Juliana Jaramillo – El Corazón y El Sombrero (Marta Gómez); Juan Gatti – El Paso Trascendental del Vodevil a la Astracanada (Fangoria); Allan Castañeda & Sandra Masías – Fiesta Inkaterra (Miki González)	
2011	Alejandro Ros	Solo un Momento	Vicentico	Natalia Ayala, Carlos Dussan Gomez & Juliana Jaramillo – El Corazón y El Sombrero (Marta Gómez); Juan Gatti – El Paso Trascendental del Vodevil a la Astracanada (Fangoria); Allan Castañeda & Sandra Masías – Fiesta Inkaterra (Miki González)	
2012	Miguel Masa	Cambie de Nombre	Viniloversus	Mzk – Bixiga70 (Bixiga70); Alejandro Ros – Canciones Para Aliens (Fito Páez); Pablo Martínez – Indeleble (Los Mesoneros); Ma+Go – Ves Lo Que Quieres Ver (Bareto)	
2013	Tonho Quinta-Feira & Fernando Young	Abraçaço	Caetano Veloso	Filipe Costa & Mateus Sá – Abaporu (Laura Lopes); Belén Mena – De Taitas y de Mamas (Various Artists); The Welcome Branding Group – El Techo es el Suelo (Quiero Club); Masa – Repeat After Me (Los Amigos Invisibles)	
2014	Alejandro Ros	Wed 21	Juana Molina	Alfredo Enciso – Activistas (Nonpalidece); Rafael Rocha – Antes Que Tu Conte Outra (Apanhador Só); Giovanni Nésterez – Combi (Lucho Quequezana); Laura Varsky – Ocho (Marco Sanguinetti)	
2015	Natalia Ayala, Carlos Dussan Gómez & Juliana Jaramillo	Este Instante	Marta Gómez	Julia Rocha – Blam! Blam! (Jonas Sá); Anna Amendola – Noel Rosa, Preto E Branco (Valéria Lobão); Pablo González & Francisca Valenzuela – Tajo Abierto (Francisca Valenzuela); Laura Varsky – Veinte Años El Grito Después (Catupecu Machu)	
2016	Sergio Mora	El Poeta Halley	Love of Lesbian	Lisa Akerman Stefaneli – Atlas (Baleia); Goster – Impredecible (Bareto); Marcus Mota – Relevante (Mario Diníz); Goster – Umbral (Melnik)	
2017	Carlos Dussán, Juliana Jaramillo, Juan Felipe Martínez & Claudio Roncoli	El Orisha de la Rosa	Magín Díaz	André Coelho & Mariana Hardy – Na Medida Do Impossível Ao Vivo No Inhotim (Fernanda Takai); Lia Cunha – Pirombeira (Pirombeira); Barão Di Sarno & Ciça Góes – Sol (Gustavo Galo); Fabio Prata – Três no Samba (André Mehmari, Eliane Faria & Gordinho do Surdo)	
2018	Carlos Sadness	Diferentes Tipos De Luz	Carlos Sadness	Miguel Vásquez "Masa" – La Gira (Sibilino); Daniel Eizirik – Meio Que Tudo É Um (Apanhador Só); Rubén Chumillas – Mismo Sitio, Distinto Lugar (Vetusta Morla); Christian Montenegro & Laura Varsky – 9 (Marco Sanguinetti)	
2019	Man Mourentan & Tamara Pérez	El Mal Querer	Rosalía	Luisa María Arango, Carlos Dussán, Manuel García-Orozco & Juliana Jaramillo-Buenaventura – Anónimas y Resilientes (Voces del Bullerengue); Emilio Lorente – Astronauta (Zahara); Deborah Salles – Lição #2: Dorival (Quartabê); Boa Mistura – Nuclear (Leiva)	
2020	Pedro Fajardo	Soy Puro Teatro - Homenaje a La Lupe	Mariaca Semprún	Victor Ricardo Aguilera Luna & Daniela Herrera Ramírez – Jinetes del Apocalipsis (Alejandro de la Garza); Lucia Arias, Edgar Guerra & Fabli Soto – Lado A (Alerta Rocket); Vetusta Morla & Pequeño Salto Mortal – MSDL - Canciones dentro de canciones (Vetusta Morla); Eva Amaral, Xavi Blanco & Charis Tsavis – Salto al Color (Amaral)	
2021	Ana Gonzalez	Colegas	Gilberto Santa Rosa	Boa Mistura – Lo Que Me Dé La Gana (Dani Martín); Emilio Lorente – Madrid Nuclear (Leiva); Emilio Lorente – Puta (Zahara); Marc Donés – Tragas o Escupes (Jarabe de Palo)	
2022	Ferran Echegaray, Viktor Hammarberg, Rosalía, Daniel Sannwald & Pili Vila	Motomami (Digital Album)	Rosalía	Isaura Angulo, Carlos Dussán, Karen Flores, Manuel Garcia-Orozco, Juliana Jaramillo, Ledania & Lido Pimienta – Ancestras (Petrona Martinez); Pedro Fajardo & Siudy Garrido – Bailaora - Mis Pies Son Mi Voz (Siudy Garrido featuring Ismael Fernandez, Manuel Gago, Jose Luis Rodriguez & Adolfo Herrera); Boa Mistura – Cuando Te Muerdes el Labio (Edición Cerámica) (Leiva); Carlos Bauer – Feira Livre (Bananeira Brass Band)	
2023	Gustavo Ramirez	Atipanakuy (Deluxe)	Kayfex	Alejandro Ros – Hotel Miranda! (Miranda!); Alejandro Ros – Nocturna (Javiera Mena); Pedro Chico – Placeres y Pecados (Vanesa Martín); Alejandro Ros – Trinchera Avanzada (Babasonicos)	
2024	Nelson Albareda, Sebastian Aristizabal, Kemelly Figueroa-Mouriz, Omer Pardillo-Cid & Albertico Rodríguez	En Vivo – 100 Años de Azúcar	Celia Cruz	Boa Mistura – Figurantes (Vetusta Morla); Carlos Sadness – Realismo Mágico (Carlos Sadness); Leonardo Macias – Tekoá (Jair Oliveira)	
2024	Carlos Ortiz	Karma	Diana Burco	Boa Mistura – Figurantes (Vetusta Morla); Carlos Sadness – Realismo Mágico (Carlos Sadness); Leonardo Macias – Tekoá (Jair Oliveira)	
2025	Aitana, Christian Molina, Miguel Torán & Isabel Vicente	Cuarto azul	Aitana	Ana González, Patricia Nunez, Francisco Pinero, Chucho Valdés & Jourdan Villarroel – Cuba and Beyond (Chucho Valdés & Royal Quartet); Leiva – Gigante (Leiva); Ana González, Patricia Nunez, Francisco Pinero & Jourdan Villarroel – Masters of Our Roots (Albita & Chucho Valdés); Daniela Tomas – Por Esas Trenzas (Lourdes Carhuas)	
