= Cantora, un Viaje Íntimo =

Studio album by Mercedes Sosa
- Released: March 2009 (Disc one); June 2009 (Disc two)
- Recorded: May 2008–June 2009
- Studios: Estudios Panda; Estudios Ion
- Genre: Folk
- Length: Disc one: 65:19; Disc two: 72:15
- Label: Sony Music Argentina
- Producer: Popi Spatocco

Mercedes Sosa chronology
Corazón Libre (2005)	Cantora, un Viaje Íntimo (2009)	Siempre 1 y 2 (2009-2010)

Cantora, un Viaje Íntimo (English: Cantora, An Intimate Journey) is a double album by Argentine singer Mercedes Sosa, released in 2009 through Sony Music Argentina. The album features Cantora 1 and Cantora 2, the project is Sosa's final album before her death on October 4, 2009.

At the 10th Annual Latin Grammy Awards, Cantora 1 was nominated for Album of the Year and won Best Folk Album and Best Recording Package, the latter award went to Alejandro Ros, the art director of the album. Additionally, Sosa won two out of five nominations for the albums at the Gardel Awards 2010, the double album was nominated for Album of the Year and Production of the Year and won Best DVD while both Cantora 1 and Cantora 2 were nominated for Best Female Folk Album, with the former winning the category.

The double album was a commercial success, being certified platinum by the CAPIF selling more than 200,000 copies in Argentina, Cantora 1 was also certified platinum selling 40,000 copies while Cantora 2 was certified gold selling 20,000 copies. The album also peaked at numbers 22 and 8 at the Top Latin Albums and Latin Pop Albums charts in the United States, respectively, being Sosa's only appearances on both charts.

At documentary film titled Mercedes Sosa, Cantora un viaje íntimo was released in 2009, it was directed by Rodrigo Vila and features the recording process of the album as well as testimonies from the different guest artists that appeared on the project.

== Background ==
The albums were produced by Popi Spatocco, frequent collaborator of Sosa, engineered by Jorge "Portugués" Da Silva and recorded from May 2008 to June 2009 at Estudios Panda and Estudios Ion, both in Buenos Aires, Argentina, the first session took place at Estudios Panda while the rest of the album was recorded at Estudios Ion, the first songs to be recorded were "Agua, Fuego, Tierra y Viento" with Argentine singer Soledad Pastorutti and "Misionera" with Brazilian accordionist Luiz Carlos Borges, the recording of the album was marked by interruptions due to the delicate health condition of Sosa, she would eventually die on October 16, 2009 at age 74, a couple of months following the release of the albums, about Cantora, Spatocco said that "it was like receiving a diploma of honor, she was dedicated to whatever happened because she knew that I had her back".

== Content ==
The album contains a series of duet versions of songs alongside different artists from both Argentina, as well as from other countries such as Mexico, Uruguay, Brazil, Colombia, Spain and Venezuela. The variety of songs included range from songs performed with their original artist to songs performed with artists different than their original performer, many of the artists featured make reprises of their own songs for the album like Gustavo Cerati in the version of Soda Stereo's "Zonas de Promesas", Charly García in the version of Serú Girán's "Desarma y Sangra" and Luis Alberto Spinetta in the version of his song "Barro Tal Vez", while others appear in versions of songs not from their discography, like Shakira, who features in the track "La Maza", originally written and performed by Silvio Rodríguez, and Vicentico who appears the version of Ruben Blades's "Parao". The albums end with a version of the Argentine National Anthem, being the only song in the albums to not feature a particular singer.

== Critical reception ==
Professional ratings
Review scores
Source	Rating
AllMusic	(Vol. 1)
AllMusic	(Vol. 2)

Mariano Prunes from AllMusic gave both volumes of the album three and a half stars out of five. In his review for Cantora 1 he wrote that "contrary to the quintessential Sosa recordings, Cantora is a fairly subdued affair, with most songs whispered against unobtrusive yet tasteful acoustic arrangements by Poppi Spatocco", also commenting that the production "certainly works very well, as it creates an encompassing sonic texture that helps to render the entire album less dissimilar than it may have been". In the review for Cantora 2 he wrote that both albums as a whole are "a touching, dignified conclusion to a musical legacy that is as enormous as it is precious" while also calling "Canción Para un Niño de la Calle", the collaboration with Puerto Rican rapper Residente, as "the highlight of the entire project".

In 2009, the Argentine edition of Rolling Stone included the album on their list of "50 Best Albums of 2009", placing it at number 2 calling it "a true artistic testament".

=== Year-end rankings ===
Publication	Country	List	Year	Rank	Ref.
Rolling Stone	Argentina	50 Best Albums of 2009	2009	2	

== Track listing ==
All tracks were produced by Popi Spatocco.

Disc one – Cantora 1
No.	Title	Writer(s)	Length
1.	"Aquellas Pequeñas Cosas" (with Joan Manuel Serrat)	Joan Manuel Serrat	2:38
2.	"Barro Tal Vez" (with Luis Alberto Spinetta)	Luis Alberto Spinetta	3:45
3.	"Sea" (with Jorge Drexler)	Jorge Drexler	3:39
4.	"Coração Vagabundo" (with Caetano Veloso)	Caetano Veloso	3:48
5.	"La Maza" (with Shakira)	Silvio Rodríguez	4:17
6.	"Zamba Para Olvidarte" (with Diego Torres and Facundo Ramírez)	Julio Fontana; Daniel Toro	5:02
7.	"Agua, Fuego, Tierra y Viento" (with Soledad Pastorutti)	Paz Martínez	3:40
8.	"Celador de Sueños" (with Gustavo Santaolalla and Orozco-Barrientos)	Raúl "Tilín" Orozco	3:38
9.	"Sabiéndose de los Descalzos" (with Julieta Venegas)	Julieta Venegas	2:54
10.	"Himno de Mi Corazón" (with León Gieco)	Miguel Abuelo	4:10
11.	"Novicia" (with Víctor Heredia)	Víctor Heredia	4:44
12.	"Zamba de los Adioses" (with Dúo Nuevo Cuyo)	Armando Tejada Gómez; Tito Francia	4:14
13.	"Nada" (with Maria Graña and Leopoldo Federico)	Horacio Sanguinetti; José Dames	3:50
14.	"Esa Musiquita" (with Teresa Parodi)	Teresa Parodi	3:07
15.	"Romance de la Luna Tucumana" (with Juan Quintero and Luna Monti)	Atahualpa Yupanqui; Pedro Aznar	4:16
16.	"Deja La Vida Volar" (with Pedro Aznar)	Víctor Jara	3:55
17.	"Pájaro de Rodillas" (with Nacha Roldán)	Alfredo Zitarrosa; Carlos Porcel "Nahuel"	3:42
Total length:			65:19

Disc two – Cantora 2
No.	Title	Writer(s)	Length
1.	"Zona de Promesas" (with Gustavo Cerati)	Gustavo Cerati	3:58
2.	"Desarma y Sangra" (with Charly García)	Charly García	2:50
3.	"Canción Para un Niño en la Calle" (with Residente)	Armando Tejada Gómez; Ángel Ritro	4:14
4.	"Parao" (with Vicentico)	Rubén Blades	4:30
5.	"Zamba del Cielo" (with Fito Páez and Liliana Herrero)	Fito Páez	4:32
6.	"Razón de Vivir" (with Lila Downs)	Víctor Heredia	4:18
7.	"El Ángel de la Bicicleta" (with Gustavo Cordera)	León Gieco	5:12
8.	"Violetas Para Violeta" (with Joaquín Sabina)	Joaquín Sabina; Violeta Parra	4:13
9.	"Jamás Te Olvidaré" (with Marcela Morelo)	Marcela Morelo	3:28
10.	"O Qué Será" (with Daniela Mercury)	Milton Nascimento; Chico Buarque	3:44
11.	"Cántame" (with Franco de Vita)	Franco de Vita	3:43
12.	"La Luna Llena" (with Rubén Rada and La Chiringa)	Nelson Araya	2:42
13.	"Canción de las Cantinas" (with Alberto Rojo)	Manuel José Castilla; Rolando Valladares	4:52
14.	"Donde Termina El Asfalto" (with Coqui Sosa)	Pablo Dumit; Coqui Sosa	3:23
15.	"Insensatez" (with Luis Salinas)	Antônio Carlos Jobim; Vinicius de Moraes	3:21
16.	"Misionera" (with Luiz Carlos Borges)	Luiz Carlos Borges	5:09
17.	"Y Así y Así" (with Luciano Pereyra)	Luciano Pereyra; Sebastián Schon	3:26
18.	"Himno Nacional Argentino"	Vicente López y Planes; Blas Parera	4:40
Total length:			72:15

== Charts ==
Weekly chart performance for Cantora
Chart (2009)	Peak position
US Top Latin Albums (Billboard)	22
US Latin Pop Albums (Billboard)	8
