= La Maza =

1982 song by Silvio Rodríguez covered by Mercedes Sosa featuring Shakira

"La Maza" (English: "The Sledgehammer") is a song written and performed by Cuban composer and musician Silvio Rodríguez in 1982. An acoustic folk song, it is known for its political message. A cover of the song by Argentine singer Mercedes Sosa featuring Colombian singer-songwriter Shakira is featured in Sosa's studio album Cantora, un Viaje Íntimo released in 2009.

== Origin ==
"La Maza" was written by Cuban composer and musician Silvio Rodríguez in 1979, and first released by him in 1982 as a part of his fifth studio album Unicornio.

== Composition and lyrics ==
"La Maza" is a folk song. The lyrics of the song have a political and social message, and explore the theme of existential questioning and the search for meaning in one's life and actions. The title of the song comes from the lyric "¿Qué cosa fuera la maza sin cantera?" English: (What would the sledgehammer be without a quarry?), referring to how life has no meaning if you don't have commitment to something. This also acts as a mirror of the society where this meaning of commitment has been forgotten. The lyric also refers to how a bond between a leader and their people rooted in the desire of change must exist.

== Reception ==
Crónica outlined how "La Maza" is one of those Sosa's songs which managed "became hymns of struggle and resistance, a reflection of her commitment to social and humanitarian causes". CiberCuba called the song a "magnificent interpretation of a famous song". In September 2020, Billboard staff listed the song as one of the 50 best Latin songs of all time, describing it as a "powerful reflection on humanity" that is "even more eloquent in its arrangement, set simply to acoustic guitar and percussion." Rolling Stone listed the song as one of the top 100 great Spanish-language songs of the 21st century, highlighting the vocal performance of Sosa and Shakira on the song. El Tucumano hailed Sosa's voice as "imposing, profound, and captivating" and praised Shakira's vocal strength and "interpretive ability in one of the most emotive recordings of her career", while describing how their version of song is way more intense than the original "transforming it into a dialogue between voices and souls".

Gabriel Urbina from Cadiznoticias reflected how "La Maza" "never gets old", continuing how it is "one of those songs that shake you strongly if you dedicate attention and time to it, looking into its eyes and drinking in the verses slowly, in small sips", and characterized its chorus as "brilliant and direct".

== Mercedes Sosa cover ==
"La Maza"

Song by Mercedes Sosa featuring Shakira

from the album Cantora, un Viaje Íntimo
- Released: 27 March 2009
- Genre: Folk
- Length: 4:17
- Label: Sony Music Argentina
- Songwriter: Silvio Rodríguez
- Producer: Popi Spatocco

Music video
- "La Maza" on YouTube

Mercedes Sosa performed the song together with Shakira in May 2008, before releasing a studio recording of the duet on her thirty-second studio album Cantora 1 on 27 March 2009, and on the double album Cantora, un Viaje Íntimo in September 2009. The recording of "La Maza" by Sosa and Shakira has an organic sound. The production is acoustic with guitar and percussion as instruments.

The official music video for "La Maza" was released in June 2021. The video consists of clips from the recording process of the song.

=== Live performance ===
On 17 May 2008, Mercedes Sosa, Shakira, and Argentine musician Pedro Aznar performed "La Maza" for an audience of 150,000 people at the ALAS Foundation charity concert in Buenos Aires, Argentina. Their performance was dubbed "one of the most emotional moments" of the concert by Diario Río Negro. With the goal to "improve the lives of Latin American children living in poverty", the concert had 27 artists perform in two countries.

== Use in politics ==
After failed peace negotiations between Colombian government and Marxist–Leninist guerrilla group FARC, and FARC announcing the re-foundation of the Edison Romaña 53 front, on 19 April 2023, the Minister of National Defence of Colombia Iván Velásquez Gómez shared a part the lyrics of "La Maza" and a link to the music video of the song by Sosa and Shakira on Twitter. The lyrics "si no creyera en lo que creo" (English: "if I didn’t believe in what I believe") were a response to the criticism he had received emphasizing his conviction in the actions of his government despite opposition calling for a motion of censure. The post was met with disapproval on social media over its appropriateness and led opposition party Partido Cambio Radical to call Velásquez's leadership a "failure".
