= Vicentico 5 =

Studio album by Vicentico
- Released: September 25, 2012
- Genre: Rock; pop; ska
- Length: 37:49
- Label: Sony Music
- Producer: Vicentico

Vicentico chronology
Solo un Momento (2010)	Vicentico 5 (2012)	Último Acto (2014)

Vicentico 5 (2012) is the fifth album by Argentine rock and pop singer-songwriter Vicentico.

== Reception ==
The AllMusic review by Mariano Prunes awarded the album 4 stars, stating: "Overall in 5, Vicentico continues to do as he pleases at the risk of confusing his fan base – his latter-day mainstream Latin-American audience will not find much to dance to in this album, and the rock/ska/punk crowd to which he originally belonged is not going to welcome the prodigal son with open arms if he insists on covering acts such as ABBA, Roberto Carlos, and Xuxa all in the same album – but hey, so far it has worked wonders for his solo career, both in commercial and artistic terms".

Professional ratings
Review scores
Source	Rating
Allmusic	4/5 stars

== Track listing ==
All tracks written by Vicentico and Cachorro Lopez except where noted.

1. "Creo que Me Enamoré" (I Think I Fell in Love) – 3:12
2. "No Te Apartes de Mí" (Don't Fall Apart from Me) – 3:19
  Written by Roberto Carlos and Erasmo Carlos.
  Spanish lyrics by Luis Gómez-Escolar.
3. "Un Diamante" (A Diamond) – 3:38
  Written by Vicentico.
4. "Soldado de Dios" (Soldier of God) – 2:51
5. "Nada Va a Cambiar" (Nothing is Going to Change) – 3:31
6. "La Tormenta" (The Storm) – 3:29
7. "Esto de Quererte" (This Loving You Thing) – 3:45
  Written by Christian De Walden, Graciela Carballo and Max Di Carlo.
8. "Sólo Hay Un Ganador" (There's Only One Winner) – 3:32
  Written by Benny Andersson and Björn Ulvaeus.
  Spanish lyrics by Joaquín Galan and Lucía Galán of Pimpinela.
9. "Fuego" (Fire) – 3:38
10. "Fuera del Mundo" (Outside the World) – 3:37
  Written by Vicentico and Sebastián Schon.
11. "Carta a un Joven Poeta" (Letter to a Young Poet) – 3:17

== Personnel ==
- Dany Avila – drums
- Cachorro López – arrangements, Synth bass
- Richard Nant – flugelhorn
- Vicentico – arrangements, backing vocals, main vocals, synth
- German Widemer – keyboard
- Demian Nava Zambrini – synth

=== Technical personnel ===
- Luis Gómez-Escolar – adaptation
- Cristian Minuta – wardrobe
- Vaino Rigozzi – personal manager
- Sebastián Schon – arrangement
- Cesar Sogbe – mixing
- Rafa Vila – A&R
