= De la Cabeza =

Live album by Bersuit Vergarabat
- Released: 2002
- Recorded: November 17 – December 15, 2001
- Venue: Estadio Obras Sanitarias
- Genre: Rock en español
- Length: 72:43
- Labels: Universal Music; Interdisc
- Producers: Alfredo Toth; Pablo Guyot; Bersuit Vergarabat

Bersuit Vergarabat chronology
Hijos del Culo (2000)	De la Cabeza (2002)	La Argentinidad al Palo (2004)

Professional ratings
Review scores
Source	Rating
AllMusic	4/5 stars

De la Cabeza is the sixth album by the Argentine Rock band Bersuit Vergarabat, released in 2002. It is the only live album of the band, recorded at the Obras Sanitarias Stadium in Buenos Aires, and at the Haedo's ShowCenter. Features the best tracks of the band until that time. The track "Un Pacto" has never been released in a studio album, and the track "Perro Amor Explota" has only been released in the Amores Perros soundtrack.

== Track listing ==
1. "De La Cabeza" – 0:30
2. "El Tiempo No Para" (Cazuza-Brandao. Translation: Cordera, Martín) – 5:21
3. "Danza De Los Muertos Pobres" (Cordera, Bianco, Martín, Céspedes) – 4:31
4. "El Viejo De Arriba" (Subirá)– 4:00
5. "Espíritu De Esta Selva" (Cordera, Subirá, Céspedes, Martín, Righi, Verenzuela) – 3:55
6. "Vuelos" (Céspedes) – 5:45
7. "Mi Caramelo" (Cordera) – 3:29
8. "Un Pacto" (Cordera) – 4:55
9. "Perro Amor Explota" (Cordera, Martín) – 4:28
10. "Tuyu" (Cordera, Bianco, Céspedes, Martín) – 5:21
11. "Yo Tomo" (Roghi, Verenzuela, Cordera, Cépedes, Subirá, Martín) – 3:46
12. "Señor Cobranza" (De la Vega) – 4:16
13. "La Bolsa" (Subirá, Cordera, Martín, Righi, Céspedes, Verenzuela) – 4:24
14. "Murguita Del Sur" (Cordera) – 5:03
15. "Se Viene" (Cordera, Verenzuela) – 3:40
16. "Hociquito De Ratón / Diez Mil (20.000.000 Pesos)" (Cordera / Martín, Bianco) – 9:21
- Diez Mil (20.000.000 Pesos) is a re-edited Bonus Studio Track from the first album of the band, Y Punto.

== Personnel ==
- Néstor Acuña – Accordion
- Gaspar Altamirano – Stage Technician
- Ananké Asseff – Photography
- Tom Baker – Mastering
- Baracus – Stage Technician
- Salvador Batalla – Photography
- Bersuit – Producer, Liner Notes
- Adrian Bilbao – Engineer
- Javier Casalla – Violin
- Pichon Dalpont – Engineer
- Pablo Guyot – Producer
- Aníbal Kerpel – Personal Assistant
- Carlos Martin – Bateria, Group Member
- Ariel Prat – Vocals
- Oscar Righi – Guitar (Electric), Group Member
- Ricardo Rojas y Su Combate Colombiano – Engineer, Mastering
- Claudio Romandini – Production Assistant
- Alejandro Ros – Graphic Design
- Gustavo Santaolalla – Vocals
- Daniel Suarez – Vocals, Coros, Group Member
- Juan Subirá – Accordion, Keyboards, Coros, Group Member
- Jaime Torres – Charango
- Alfredo Toth – Producer
- Manuel Uriona – Percussion
- Alejandro Vázquez – A&R

== Releases ==
- In later releases of the album, the track 4, "El Viejo De Arriba", was changed for the track named "La Petisita Culona", also played in the same concerts, but non included in the first releases of the album.
- Also, In later releases, there's a bonus track named "Diez Mil (20.000.000 Pesos) (Miserable Mix By Plankton Man)"

== Charts and certifications ==
Country	Peak position
Argentina CD	1
Argentina DVD	1

Region	Certification	Certified units/sales
Argentina (CAPIF)	5× Platinum	200,000^{^}
Argentina (CAPIF) for the DVD	6× Platinum	48,000^{^}
^{^} Shipments figures based on certification alone.

== See also ==
- List of best-selling albums in Argentina
