= Los pájaros =

Los Pajaros

Studio album by Vicentico
- Released: October 25, 2006
- Genre: Rock; pop; ska
- Length: 40:10
- Label: BMG

Vicentico chronology
Los Rayos (2004)	Los Pajaros (2006)	Solo un Momento (2010)

Los pájaros (The Birds) is the third studio album by the pop rock artist Vicentico. It was released in 2006 through BMG.

== Track listing ==
All tracks by Vicentico except where noted.

1. "El Arbol de la Plaza" (The Tree of The Square) – 4:26
2. "El Baile" (The Dance) – 4:00
3. "Ayer" (Yesterday) – 3:50
4. "Si Me Dejan" (If They Let Me) – 3:58
5. "Felicidad" (Happiness) – 4:01
6. "La Deuda" (The Debt) – 3:58
7. "Desapareció" (It Disappeared) – 4:43
8. "Las Hojas" (The Leafs) – 3:58
9. "El Fantasma" (The Ghost) – 2:46
10. "Las Manos" (The Hands) – 4:22

== Personnel ==
- Vicentico – vocals
