= La taberna del Buda =

Studio album by Café Quijano
- Released: May 22, 2001
- Genre: Spanish Music/Soft Rock
- Label: Warner Music Latina

Café Quijano chronology
La Extraordinaria Paradoja del Sonido Quijano (1999)	La taberna del Buda (2001)	¡Qué grande es esto del amor! (2003)

La taberna del Buda (The Buddha's Tavern) is the Spanish band Café Quijano's 3rd album.

== Track listing ==
1. "Nada de ná" – 3:41
2. "De piratas" – 3:49
3. "Desde Brazil" – 3:53
4. "Lucía, la corista – 4:19
5. "Qué le debo a la vida" – 4:02
6. "En aquel hotel jamaicano" – 3:52
7. "La taberna del Buda" – 3:47
8. "Otra vez (Qué pena de mi)" – 4:20
9. "Las llaves de Raquel" – 3:52
10. "Qué poca cosa" – 4:09
11. "En mis besos" – 3:35
12. "Otra vez (Qué pena de mi) con Olga Tañón" – 4:18

== Commercial performance ==
The album stayed on Spanish charts for 67 weeks, selling nearly 500,000 units. Overall it has shifted one million copies.
