= Café Quijano =

Spanish pop rock band

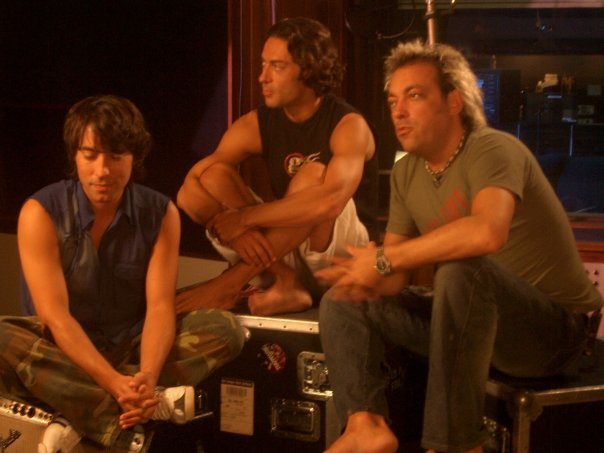
- Café Quijano Band

Background information
- Origin: León, Spain
- Genres: Rock, pop, blues, Latin
- Years active: 1998–2007, 2017-present
- Members: Manuel Quijano; Óscar Quijano; Raúl Quijano
- Website: www.cafequijano.com

Café Quijano is a Spanish pop rock band formed by three brothers, Manuel, Óscar, and Raúl Quijano, all of whom are singers. The brothers are originally from León, along with their father, who ran a musical pub called "La Lola" in the city centre, which gave name to one of their most well-known songs. Apart from publishing four successful albums, they presented galas, collaborated with Disney for soundtracks, and worked on a project with Castilla y León's image to promote tourism to the region.

Their third album was a big success and it sold 500,000 units, while their debut album was released in Spain and Mexico only, where it sold 75,000 and 45,000 units.

Throughout its history, the band has collaborated with artists such as the outstanding Cuban musician Pancho Amat on their debut album. Olga Tañon sings with them in "La Taberna del Buda", and on their last production, they sang with Joaquín Sabina and Celine Dion.

In April 2007, Manuel Quijano, the lead singer, announced his first solo CD (Vidas y Venidas) and confirmed that, after the promotion of ¡Qué grande es esto del amor!, the group was to split up.

== Discography ==
- Café Quijano (1998)
1. "Loco de amor"
2. "Ante todo"
3. "Tu ritmo loco"
4. "Poesía de amor"
5. "La duda eterna"
6. "La vecinita"
7. "Discúlpame"
8. "Envidia"
9. "Pensando en ti"
10. "Porque me miras"
- La Extraordinaria Paradoja del Sonido Quijano (1999)
1. "La Lola"
2. "Sangre negra"
3. "Hablando a un cristal"
4. "El perdido"
5. "Morenita"
6. "Falsas promesas"
7. "Vete de mí"
8. "Los locos"
9. "Lágrimas de miel"
10. "En algún rincón"
- La Taberna del Buda (2001)
- ¡Qué Grande Es Esto del Amor! (2003)
1. "Tequila"
2. "Cerrando bares"
3. "El arte del teatro"
4. "La duquesa"
5. "¡Qué grande es esto del amor!"
6. "¿Por qué me miente?"
7. "Todo es mentira"
8. "El loco triste"
9. "Dame de esa boca"
10. "Nadie lo entiende" (Chorus feat. Celine Dion)
11. "No tienes corazón" (feat. Joaquín Sabina)
12. "Sirvame una copita"

== Trivia ==
- Café Quijano wrote the lyrics for and sang in Disney's Spanish-dubbed version of Lilo & Stitch, providing the main song called "Ardiente Amor" ("Burning Love").
- In 2004 Café Quijano composed the Spain National Football Team's song for that year's Eurocup, called "Sírvame una Copita" (Pour me a drink). The Spanish meaning of "Sírvame una Copita" for Eurocup is "Serve (bring) me a cup" (the winning cup of Eurocup).
- They were among the artists selected by Armando Manzanero to make his record "Duetos" (Duets), in which they sing "Esperaré" ("I'll Wait").
