= Los Rayos =

Studio album by Vicentico
- Released: September 14, 2004
- Recorded: April 2004
- Genres: Rock; pop; ska
- Label: BMG
- Producers: Vicentico, Afo Verde

Vicentico chronology
Vicentico (2002)	Los Rayos (2004)	Los pájaros (2006)

Los Rayos (The Lightnings) (2004) is the second album by Argentine singer-songwriter Vicentico from his solo career. The album received a Latin Grammy Award nomination for Best Singer-Songwriter Album.

== Track listing ==
All tracks by Vicentico except where noted

1. "Los Caminos de la Vida" (The Ways of Life) (Omar Antonio Geles Suárez) – 4:03
2. "La Libertad" (The Freedom) – 4:09
3. "Las Armas" (The Weapons) – 4:07
4. "El Barco" (The Ship) – 3:06
5. "El Tonto" (The Fool) – 3:37
6. "Tiburón" (Shark) (Ruben Blades) – 3:05
7. "Soy Feliz" (I'm Happy) – 3:42
8. "El Engaño" (The Deceive) – 3:35
9. "La Verdad" (The Truth) – 3:28
10. "El Cielo" (The Sky) – 4:31
11. "La Nada" (Nothingness) – 3:36
12. "La Señal" (The Sign) – 3:52

== Personnel ==
- Vicentico – vocals, art direction, musical direction, producer
- Dani Buira – drums, percussion
- Daniela Castro – double bass
- Juan E. Scalona – trombone

=== Guest musicians ===
- Flavio Oscar Cianciarulo – bass
- Lucho González – guitar
- Erving Stutz – flugelhorn, trombone, trumpet, wind arrangements
- Julieta Venegas – accordion, piano, vocals

=== Technical personnel ===
- Amadeo Alvarez – production assistant
- Sebastián Arpesella – photography
- Javier Caso – production assistant
- Walter Chacon – engineer, mixing
- Pablo Durand – programming
- Cynthia Lejbowicz – production coordination
- Nora Lezano – photography
- Paco Martin – A&R
- Diego Ortells – programming
- Diego Ramirez – assistant
- Eduardo Rivero – studio assistant
- Alejandro Ros – graphic design
- Afo Verde – A&R, art direction, musical direction, producer
- Carlos Martos Wensell – mastering engineer
