= Un día =

Studio album by Juana Molina
- Released: 6 October 2008
- Genre: Folktronica; experimental; neofolk; indietronica; lo-fi; psychedelic
- Label: Domino; Crammed Discs (2014 re-issue)
- Producer: Juana Molina

Juana Molina chronology
Son (2006)	Un día (2008)	Wed 21 (2013)

Professional ratings
Aggregate scores
Source	Rating
Metacritic	77/100
Review scores
Source	Rating
AllMusic	4/5 stars
Drowned in Sound	7/10
The Guardian	3/5 stars
MusicOMH	4/5 stars
Pitchfork	7.5/10
PopMatters	8/10
Rolling Stone	4/5 stars
Spin	8/10
Tiny Mix Tapes	4/5 marks

Un día (transl. One Day) is the fifth studio album by Argentine singer-songwriter Juana Molina. It was first released on 6 October 2008 by Domino Records. Sonically, the album is abstract and consists of layered loops. It received generally positive reviews from music critics.

== Track listing ==
All tracks are written by Juana Molina.

Un día track listing
No.	Title	Length
1.	"Un día" ("One Day")	5:35
2.	"Vive solo" ("He Lives Alone")	5:58
3.	"Lo dejamos" ("We Leave It")	7:31
4.	"Los hongos de Marosa" ("The Mushrooms of Marosa")	7:27
5.	"¿Quién? (Suite)" ("Who? (Suite)")	7:22
6.	"El vestido" ("The Dress")	4:31
7.	"No llama" ("He Doesn't Call")	5:20
8.	"Dar (qué difícil)" ("To Give (How Hard)")	6:41

== Charts ==
Chart performance for Un día
Chart (2008)	Peak position
US Top Latin Albums (Billboard)	59
US Latin Pop Albums (Billboard)	14
