= Son (Juana Molina album) =

2006 studio album by Juana Molina

Studio album by Juana Molina
- Released: 23 May 2006
- Genre: Folktronica; folk-ambient; experimental
- Label: Domino; Crammed Discs (2014 re-issue)
- Producer: Juana Molina

Juana Molina chronology
Tres cosas (2002)	Son (2006)	Un día (2008)

Professional ratings
Aggregate scores
Source	Rating
Metacritic	79/100
Review scores
Source	Rating
AllMusic	4/5 stars
Entertainment Weekly	B+
Lost At Sea	8/10
The Phoenix	3/4 stars
Pitchfork	7.8/10
PopMatters	7/10
Prefix	9/10
Stylus	B
Tiny Mix Tapes	5/5

Son is the fourth studio album by Argentine singer-songwriter Juana Molina. It was released on 23 May 2006 by Domino Recording Company. It has received critical acclaim.

== Title ==
Son is named after the various meanings of the word in Spanish. They include: "pleasant sound", "they are", a Cuban music genre, and the unit of sound sone.

== Track listing ==
All tracks are written by Juana Molina

No.	Title	Length
1.	"Río Seco"	3:32
2.	"Yo No"	4:57
3.	"La Verdad"	6:40
4.	"Un Beso Llega"	7:18
5.	"No Seas Antipática"	4:21
6.	"Micael"	3:03
7.	"Son"	3:24
8.	"Las Culpas"	2:42
9.	"Malherido"	4:22
10.	"Desordenado"	2:20
11.	"Elena"	4:31
12.	"Hay Que Ver Si Voy"	8:29

== Charts ==
Chart performance for Son
Chart (2006)	Peak position
UK Independent Albums (OCC)	45
