= Halo (Juana Molina album) =

Studio album by Juana Molina
- Released: May 5, 2017
- Studio: Molina's home studio, Argentina; Sonic Ranch, United States
- Genre: Folktronica; art pop; experimental
- Length: 56:30
- Label: Crammed Discs
- Producer: Juana Molina; Odín Schwartz

Juana Molina chronology
Wed 21 (2013)	Halo (2017)	Doga (2025)

Singles from Halo
- 1. "Cosoco" Released: March 2017

Halo is the seventh studio album by Argentine singer-songwriter Juana Molina, released on May 5, 2017, by Crammed Discs.

== Title and artwork ==
The title Halo is a reference to the Argentine folk legend for the will-o'-the-wisp, known as the "luz mala" (Spanish for "evil light"), which floats above the ground where bones are buried.

== Critical reception ==
Professional ratings
Aggregate scores
Source	Rating
AnyDecentMusic?	7.9/10
Metacritic	84/100
Review scores
Source	Rating
AllMusic	4/5 stars
Drowned in Sound	10/10
Financial Times	4/5 stars
The Guardian	4/5 stars
Mixmag	7/10
Mojo	4/5 stars
Pitchfork	8.0/10
PopMatters	8/10
Record Collector	4/5 stars
Uncut	8/10

Upon release, Halo received widespread acclaim from critics. At Metacritic, which assigns a normalized rating out of 100 to reviews from mainstream critics, the album received an average score of 84, based on 13 reviews. Robin Denselow from The Guardian gave the album a positive review, writing: "There are sturdy melodies on the quietly charming "Cosoco" or "Cálculos y oráculos", but even an apparently conventional song is soon transformed by her edgy and intriguing off-kilter soundscapes." Drowned in Sound's Lee Adcock gave the album the highest rating and felt that "even for Molina, who has trekked odysseys through drone and voice before, Halo marks an epiphany in the science of travel. How does one hour flow so swiftly? How do the echoes of former futures sound so fresh again, as if their waning promise of grandeur never faded?"

== Accolades ==
In The Village Voice's Pazz & Jop, an poll regarding the best albums of the year as voted by more than 400 American music critics, Halo ranked number 97 with 78 points.

Publication	Accolade	Rank	Ref.
AllMusic	Best of 2017	*	
Bandcamp Daily	The Best Albums of 2017	23	
Drowned in Sound	Favourite Albums of 2017	10	
The Guardian	The Best Albums of 2017	34	
Les Inrockuptibles	Best of Musique 2017	51	
Stereogum	50 Best Albums of 2017 So Far	35	
Uncut	Best Releases of 2017	17	
The Village Voice	Pazz & Jop	97	
The Vinyl Factory	20 Best Albums of 2017 So Far	*	
The Wire	Best Releases of 2017	26	

== Track listing ==
All tracks are written by Juana Molina.

No.	Title	Length
1.	"Paraguaya"	3:44
2.	"Sin dones"	5:41
3.	"Lentísimo halo"	5:24
4.	"In the Lassa"	4:39
5.	"Cosoco"	4:58
6.	"Cálculos y oráculos"	4:47
7.	"Los pies helados"	5:23
8.	"A00 B01"	4:30
9.	"Cara de espejo"	5:03
10.	"Andó"	3:50
11.	"Estalacticas"	4:53
12.	"Al oeste"	3:38
Total length:		56:30

== Charts ==
Chart performance for Halo
Chart (2017)	Peak position
US Latin Pop Albums (Billboard)	15
