= Hijos del Culo =

Studio album by Bersuit Vergarabat
- Released: 2000
- Recorded: 2000. Estudio Panda. Pichón Mobile Studio. La Casa (L.A.). Estudio Sound Castle. Presicion Mastering. Estudio Movil de Rojas.
- Genre: Rock en Español
- Length: 61:24
- Label: Surco/Universal Music
- Producer: Gustavo Santaolalla

Bersuit Vergarabat chronology
Libertinaje (1998)	Hijos del Culo (2000)	De la Cabeza (2002)

Singles from Hijos del Culo
- 1. "La bolsa" 2. "La del toro"

Hijos del Culo is the fifth album by the Argentine rock band Bersuit Vergarabat, released in 2000.

== Track listing ==
1. "El Gordo Motoneta" [The Scooter Fat] (Cordera, Céspedes) – 3:54
2. "La Del Toro" [Bull's Song] (Cordera, Suárez) – 4:05
3. "El Viejo De Arriba" [The Oldman from Upstairs] (Subirá) – 3:26
4. "Canción De Juan" [John's Song] (Cordera, Céspedes) – 5:36
5. "Desconexión Sideral" [Sideral Desconection] (Subirá) – 4:51
6. "Porteño De Ley" (Verenzuela) – 3:46
7. "Caroncha" (Cordera) – 5:05
8. "La Petisita Culona" [The Big Ass Runt] (Verenzuela, Righi) – 3:37
9. "Toco Y Me Voy" [Touch and Go] (Subirá, Céspedes) – 4:09
10. "La Vida Boba" [The Dork Life] (Cordera) – 4:59
11. "Grasún" (Subirá, Martin) – 3:58
12. "Negra Murguera" (Subirá, Céspedes) – 5:50
13. "La Bolsa" [The Bag] (Subirá, Cordera, Martín, Céspedes, Righi, Verenzuela) – 3:32
14. "Veneno De Humanidad" [Humanity Poison] (Subirá, Céspedes, Cordera) – 5:17
15. "Es Importante" [It's Important] (Cordera, Céspedes, Martín) – 3:29

== Charts and sales ==
Country	Peak position	Certification	Sales/shipments
Argentina	1	2× Platinum	100.000
