= Wed 21 =

2013 studio album by Juana Molina

Studio album by Juana Molina
- Released: 28 October 2013
- Recorded: 2009–2012
- Genres: Folktronica; experimental rock; indietronica; IDM; ambient
- Label: Crammed Discs
- Producer: Juana Molina

Juana Molina chronology
Un día (2008)	Wed 21 (2013)	Halo (2017)

Singles from Wed 21
- 1. "Eras" Released: 3 September 2013

Professional ratings
Aggregate scores
Source	Rating
AnyDecentMusic?	7.5/10
Metacritic	80/100
Review scores
Source	Rating
AllMusic	4/5 stars
Drowned in Sound	7/10
Filter	81%
The Independent	5/5 stars
MusicOMH	4/4 stars
Mixmag	4/5 stars
PopMatters	8/10
Pitchfork	7.3/10
Rolling Stone Argentina	4/5 stars

Wed 21 is the sixth studio album by Argentine singer and songwriter Juana Molina. It was released on 28 October 2013 by Crammed Discs. From 2009 to 2012, Molina worked on the album independently, recording at her house in Buenos Aires. Musically, Wed 21 is a folktronica album with a sound similar to her previous releases, but with innovations like the use of bass, drums, many electric guitars, noise, a horn and more detailed electronics, which led the Argentine edition of Rolling Stone to describe it as her most "rocker" album. The album received rave reviews from music critics, who noted it was not a departure from her distinctive sound but still a progression.

The album's title comes from a track recorded on 21 November 2012, which did not have a name at the time.

== Track listing ==
All tracks are written by Juana Molina.

Wed 21 track listing
No.	Title	Length
1.	"Eras" ("You Were")	4:25
2.	"Wed 21"	3:18
3.	"Ferocísimo" ("The Most Ferocious")	3:23
4.	"Lo Decidí Yo" ("I Decided It")	4:06
5.	"Sin Guía, No" ("Not Without a Guide")	4:52
6.	"Ay, No Se Ofendan" ("Oh, Don't Get Offended")	5:30
7.	"Bicho Auto" ("Bug Car")	4:34
8.	"El Oso de la Guarda" ("The Guardian Bear")	6:39
9.	"Las Edades" ("The Ages")	4:17
10.	"La Rata" ("The Rat")	4:18
11.	"Final Feliz" ("Happy Ending")	3:47
12.	"De Algún Instinto Animal" ("By Some Animal Instinct")	4:03

== Charts ==
Chart performance for Wed 21
Chart (2013)	Peak position
US Top Dance Albums (Billboard)	21
US Top Latin Albums (Billboard)	22
US Latin Pop Albums (Billboard)	7
