= Testosterona =

Studio album by Bersuit Vergarabat
- Released: 2005
- Recorded: April–May, 2005
- Genre: Rock en Español
- Length: 52:11
- Label: Surco/Universal Music
- Producer: Gustavo Santaolalla, Bersuit Vergarabat

Bersuit Vergarabat chronology
La Argentinidad al Palo (2004)	Testosterona (2005)	Bersuit (2006)

Singles from Testosterona
- 1. "Madre hay una sola" 2. "Yo"; 3. "En la ribera" 4. "Sencillamente"; 5. "Esperando el impacto"

Professional ratings
Review scores
Source	Rating
AllMusic	4/5 stars

Testosterona is the eighth album by Argentine rock band Bersuit Vergarabat, released in 2005. The album was recorded in El Cielito studio, Buenos Aires, Argentina, between April and May 2005.

== Track listing ==
1. "Yo" [Me] (Subirá, Céspedes) [I] – 3:24
2. "Me Duele Festejar" [It Pains Me to Celebrate] (Cordera, Céspedes, Suárez) – 2:58
3. "En La Ribera" [At the Riverbank] (Cordera) – 4:56
4. "Sencillamente" [Simply] (Cordera, Martín, Céspedes) – 5:07
5. "O Vas A Misa..." [Either You Go to the Mass...] (Cordera, Céspedes, Martín) – 3:22
6. "Esperando El Impacto" [Waiting for The Impact] (Righi) – 3:36
7. "Andan Yugando" [They Keep Playing] (Subirá, Céspedes) – 3:15
8. "Madre Hay Una Sola" [There's Only One Mother] (Cordera) – 4:13
9. "Vamo' En La Salud" [Let's Go Healthily] (Verenzuela) – 2:53
10. "Inundación" [Flood] (Subirá, Céspedes) – 4:26
11. "Barriletes" [Kites] (Subirá, Céspedes) – 4:49
12. "Flor De Mis Heridas" [The Flower of My Wounds] (Subirá, Cordera) – 4:19
13. "...Y Llegará La Paz" [...and Peace Will Come] (Cordera, Céspedes) – 4:43

== Personnel ==
- Gustavo E. Cordera – lead vocals
- Alberto Verenzuela – guitar, vocals
- Oscar Humberto Righi – guitar
- Carlos E. Martín – drums
- Rene Isel Céspedes – Bass, backing vocals
- Daniel Suárez – backing vocals
- Germán Sbarbatti – backing vocals
- Juan Subirá – keyboards

== Charts and certifications ==
Country	Peak position	Certification	Sales/shipments
Argentina	1	3× Platinum	160.000
