= Solo un Momento =

Sólo Un Momento

Studio album by Vicentico
- Released: September 29, 2010
- Studio: Balón Records
- Genre: Rock; Pop; Ska
- Length: 42:39
- Label: BMG
- Producer: Cachorro Lopez

Vicentico chronology
Los pájaros (2006)	Sólo Un Momento (2010)	Vicentico 5 (2012)

Sólo un Momento (Only a Moment) is the fourth album by Argentine rock and pop singer-songwriter Vicentico. It was released on September 29, 2010.

== Reception ==
The AllMusic review by Mariano Prunes awarded the album 3.5 stars, stating: "Vicentico's fourth solo album Sólo un Momento marks a stylistic departure from the Latin path in which he seemed so firmly entrenched by now, either as a solo artist or as the singer of Los Fabulosos Cadillacs... This is the first Vicentico production that does not feature horns and percussion, and the effect is initially quite strange. Above all, Solo un Momento comes off as a very somber album... Furthermore, the main problem with going back to a stripped-to-basics pop song format is that in order to stand out you need either a brilliant melody, lyric, or vocal performance, and while Vicentico has become quite accomplished at all of the above, he is not quite one of the true greats. Precisely for this reason, the value of Solo un Momento lies in its impressive artistic coherence more than in its individual moments".

Professional ratings
Review scores
Source	Rating
AllMusic	3.5/5 stars

== Track listing ==
All tracks by Vicentico except where noted. iTunes iMac

=== Songs ===
1. "Ya No Te Quiero" (I Don't Love You Anymore) – 3:19
2. "Sólo Un Momento" (Only a Moment) (Vicentico, Cachorro Lopez) – 3:57
3. "Viento" (Wind) – 3:06
4. "La Carta" (The Letter) (Capello, Lopez) – 4:04
5. "Cobarde" (Coward) – 3:10
6. "El Rey del Rock & Roll" (The King of Rock & Roll) – 2:48
7. "Morir a Tu Lado" (Dying at Your Side) (Capello, Lopez) – 4:02
8. "Escondido" (Hidden) (Capello, Lopez) – 3:24
9. "Sabor a Nada" (Taste of Nothing) (Ramón Ortega, Dino Ramos) – 3:54
10. "El Pacto" (The Pact) – 4:13
11. "Luca" – 3:27
12. "El Otro" (The Other) – 3:15
13. "Paisaje" (Bonus Track) – 3:42

== Personnel ==
- Dany Avila – drums
- Balon Rocop - mánager
- Cachorro López – synthesizer
- Vicentico – drums, E-Bow, synthesizer, sitar
- Rafa Vila – A&R
