= La Argentinidad al Palo =

- La Argentinidad al Palo

Studio album by Bersuit Vergarabat
- Released: 2004 (Argentina)
- Genre: Rock en Español
- Length: 104:19
- Label: Surco/Universal Music
- Producer: Gustavo Santaolalla, Pepe Céspedes & Righi

Bersuit Vergarabat chronology
De la Cabeza (2002)	La Argentinidad al Palo (2004)	Testosterona (2005)

Singles from La Argentinidad al palo
- 1. "La soledad" 2. "La Argentinidad al palo" 3. "Porno star"

La Argentinidad al Palo: Se Es, Lo Que Se Es is the seventh album by the Argentine Rock band Bersuit Vergarabat, released in 2004. Released firstly in two different discs, Se Es (If It Is) as disc 1 and Lo Que Se Es (What It Is) as disc 2.

== Disc 1: Se Es ==
1. "Coger No Es Amor" [Fucking Is Not Love] (Gustavo Cordera) – 4:06
2. "La Soledad" [Loneliness] (Cordera, Daniel Suárez, Germán Sbarbatti) – 4:23
3. "Va Por Chapultepec" [Going Through Chapultepec] (Cordera, Pepe Céspedes) – 3:58
4. "Convalescencia En Valencia" [Convalescence in Valence] (Juan Subirá) – 4:57
5. "Fisurar" [Fissure] (Alberto Verenzuela) – 3:19
6. "Al Olor Del Hogar" [Smell of Home] (Ariel Prat) – 3:17
7. "La Argentinidad Al Palo" [Argentineness to the Maximum] (Cordera, Oscar Righi, Subirá, Céspedes, Carlos Enrique Martín) – 5:29
8. "A Destiempo" [Out of Time] (Verenzuela) – 3:37
9. "El Baile De La Gambeta" [Dribbling Dance] (Cordera) – 3:59
10. "No Seas Parca" [Don't Be a Death Man] (Subirá, Céspedes) – 3:43
11. "Como Un Bolu" [Like a Jerk] (Subirá, Céspedes, Righi) – 2:16
12. "La Calavera" [The Skull] (Cordera, Céspedes) – 5:42

== Disc 2: Lo Que Se Es ==
1. "Shit Shit Money Money" (Cordera) – 5:11
2. "Porno Star" (Subirá) – 3:53
3. "La Oveja Negra" [The Black Sheep] (Cordera) – 4:20
4. "Otra Sudestada" [Another Southeast-ing] (Cordera, Céspedes, Martín) – 6:26
5. "Zi Zi Zi" (Verenzuela) – 3:31
6. "Hecho En Buenos Aires" [Made In Buenos Aires] (Subirá, Céspedes) – 4:51
7. "Mariscal Tito" [Marshal Tito] (Cordera, Céspedes) – 4:49
8. "Y No Está Solo..." [And He's Not Alone...] (Cordera, Céspedes) – 6:44
9. "Pájaro Negro" [Black Bird] (Subirá) – 4:31
10. "Murga De La Limousine" [The Limousine Buskers] (Subirá, Martín, Céspedes, Cordera) – 2:56
11. "El Viento Trae Una Copla" [The Wind Brings a Song] (Bersuit Vergarabat) – 8:21

== Charts and certifications ==
Country	Peak position	Certification	Sales/shipments
Argentina	1	5× Platinum	200.000
