= Vicentico =

Argentine singer, musician and composer (born 1964)

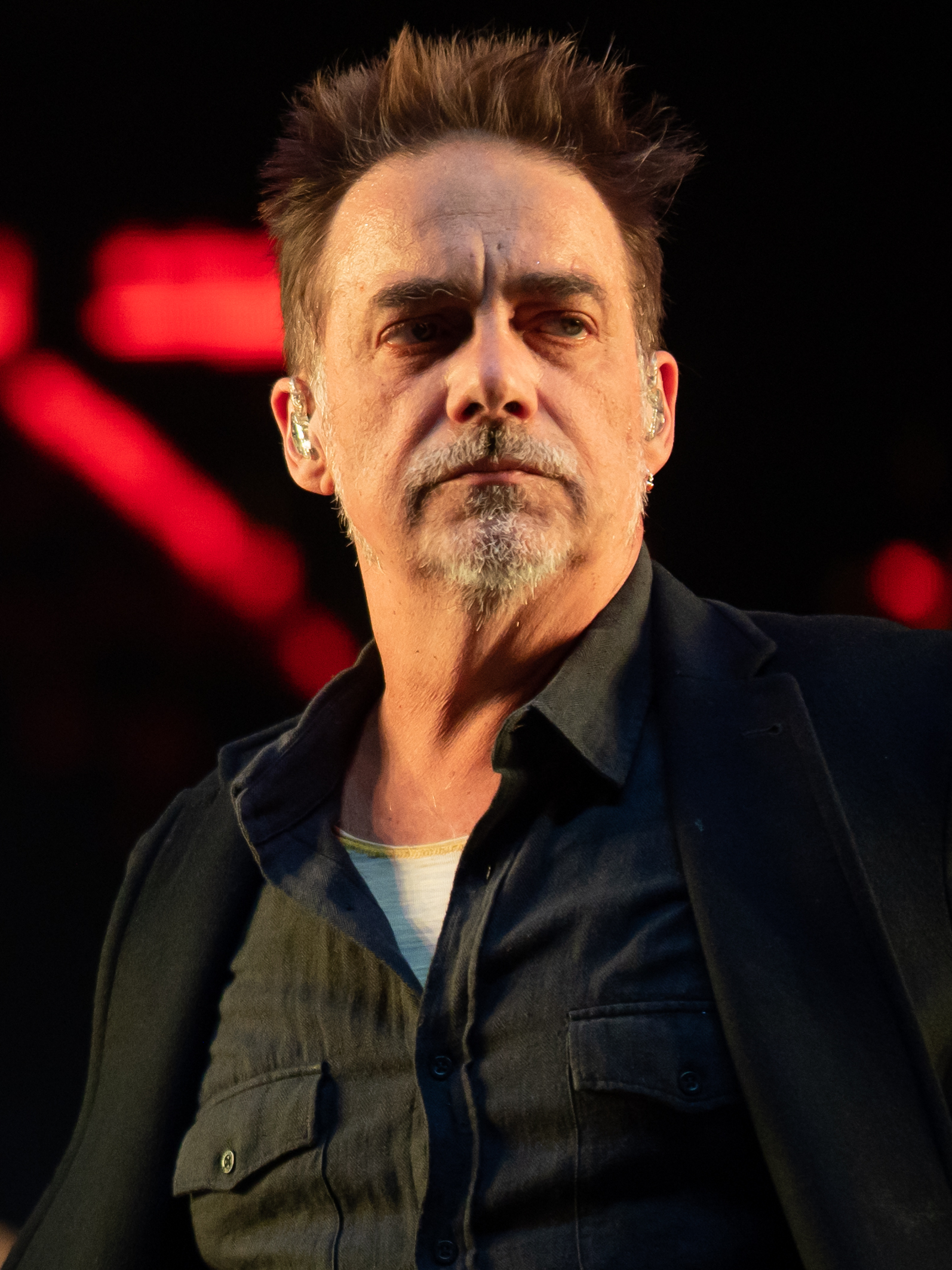
- Vicentico in 2023

Background information
- Born: Gabriel Julio Fernández Capello; July 24, 1964 (age 62); Buenos Aires, Argentina
- Genres: Ska, Reggae, Rock, Pop
- Occupations: Musician, Songwriter
- Instrument: Vocals
- Years active: 1978–present
- Label: Sony Music
- Member of: Los Fabulosos Cadillacs
- Spouse: Valeria Bertuccelli (m. 1994)

Gabriel Julio Fernández Capello (born July 24, 1964), better known as Vicentico, is an Argentine musician and composer. Co-founder and vocalist of the band Los Fabulosos Cadillacs along with Flavio Cianciarulo. He was part of the group since its creation in 1984 to the year 2001, when he began a solo career as a singer. Vicentico won the Latin Grammy Award for Best Rock Album in 2021 for El Pozo Brillante and Best Rock Song for "Ahora 1".

He lives with his wife, actress Valeria Bertuccelli, and their sons Florián and Vicente.

== Discography ==
=== Studio albums ===
1. Vicentico (2002)
2. Los Rayos (2004)
3. Los pájaros (2006)
4. Solo un Momento (2010)
5. Vicentico 5 (2012)
6. Último acto (2014)
7. El hombre (2016)
8. El Pozo Brillante (2021)

=== Guest appearances ===
- "Vuelve" (A.B. Quintanilla III y Los Kumbia All Starz featuring Vicentico and Mala Rodríguez) (Planeta Kumbia) (2008)
