= Cimarrón (band) =

Colombian musical group

- Origin: Bogotá, Colombia
- Genres: Joropo, world music
- Instruments: Harp, cuatro, maracas, bandola, surdo, bass, cajón de rumba
- Years active: 2000–present
- Labels: Smithsonian Folkways
- Members: Carlos Cuco Rojas; Ana Veydó
- Website: www.cimarroncolombia.com

Cimarrón is a Colombian musical group of festive dance music joropo from the plains of the Orinoco River. This Grammy-nominated band makes Latin music with Andalusian, Indigenous American native and African roots. Their music includes four-stringed cuatro, harp, maracas, and also Peruvian-flamenco cajón, Brazilian surdo, afro-Colombian tambora, a stomp dance as a percussion component and tribal indigenous whistles.

== History ==
Singer Ana Veydó and harpist Carlos "Cuco" Rojas founded Cimarón in Colombia. Rojas was part of a delegation of Colombian musicians that played for the Colombian writer Gabriel García Márquez during the awarding of Nobel Prize in Literature 1982 in Stockholm, Sweden.

Cimarrón started to promote their work in international folk and world music festivals such as Smithsonian Folklife Festival, WOMEX Festival, WOMAD, Lake Eden Arts Festival, Newport Folk Festival, China National Center for the Performing Arts, Rainforest World Music Festival, Paléo Festival, Glatt & Verkehrt, Festival Músicas do Mundo, Festival Rio Loco, Festival Mawazine, Rajasthan International Folk Festival, Førde International Folk Music Festival, Sfinks Mixed, Flamenco Biennale Nederland, Lotus World Music & Arts Festival, National Cowboy Poetry Gathering, Utah Arts Festival, San Francisco International Arts Festival, Globalquerque, Festival International de Lousiane, Festival Nuit du Suds, Zomer van Antwerpen, Abu Dhabi Culture & Heritage, Festival México Centro Histórico and other stages across Europe, the United States, Asia, America and the Middle East.

Their 2004 album, Sí soy llanero (Smithsonian Folkways Recordings), was a Best Traditional World Music Album nominee in the 47th Annual Grammy Awards. They were nominated for a Latin Grammy in 2019 for Best Folk Album with their release, Orinoco.

In 2007, Cimarrón worked on a live album with the Official Harpist to the Prince of Wales, Catrin Finch, and they also toured all over the United Kingdom.

Smithsonian Folkways Recordings also released Cimarrón's 2011 album, ¡Cimarrón! Joropo Music from the plains of Colombia. In those years, Cimarrón presented their Orinoco performance. They were Best Latin Album winner in the 2012 Independent Music Awards and a Best Traditional Music Show nominee in the 2014 Premios Lunas del Auditorio de Mexico.

Cimarrón has performed in the United States, Spain, Portugal, France, Belgium, Netherlands, Switzerland, Norway, England, Czech Republic, Austria, Slovenia, Scotland, Croatia, Wales, Morocco, Arab Emirates, India, China, Japan, Malaysia, Rajasthan, Lebanon, Algeria, Mexico, Nicaragua, Guatemala, Costa Rica, El Salvador, República Dominicana, Panama, Colombia, Ecuador, Argentina, Chile y Uruguay.

== Discography ==
Year	Album	Record label
2004	Sí, soy llanero	Smithsonian Folkways
2007	Catrin Finch and Cimarron Live YN BYW	Astar Artes Recordings
2011	¡Cimarrón! Joropo music from the Plains of Colombia	Smithsonian Folkways
2019	Orinoco	Cimarrón Music

== Awards and nominations ==
Year	Work	Award	Nomination	Result
2004	Sí, soy llanero	Grammy Awards	Best Traditional World Music Album	Nominee
2012	¡Cimarrón! Joropo music from the Plains of Colombia	Independent Music Awards	Best Latin Album	Winner
2014	Orinoco	Premios Luna del Auditorio de México	Best Traditional Music Show	Nominee
2019	Orinoco	Latin Grammy Awards	Best Folk Album	Nominee
2019	Zumbajam	Independent Music Awards	Best Instrumental Song	Winner
2020	Orinoco	Songlines Music Awards	Best Group	Winner

== Features ==
Cimarron have some guest appearances in other Colombian music records from artists such as Aterciopelados, Carlos Vives and Magín Díaz.

In 1996, the band was guest by Aterciopelados to play the harp and cuatro for their song La culpable, written by Andrea Echeverri and Héctor Buitrago, and included in the album La Pipa de la Paz. This album was Grammy nominated for Best Latin/Alternative Album.

Cimarrón also played the music for the song Dios y el alma in children's album Pombo musical, produced in 2008 by Carlos Vives. This record, winner of the Latin Grammy for Best Children's Album, includes another guest appearances from Colombian artists such as Juanes, Cabas and Fonseca.

In 2017, Cimarrón performed a song with Colombian popular musician Magín Díaz on his album El Orisha de la Rosa, which was the winner of a Latin Grammy for Best Packaging Design.
