= O Tempo Não Para (album) =

Live album by Cazuza
- Released: 1988
- Recorded: 14–16 October 1988
- Venues: Canecão, Rio de Janeiro, Rio de Janeiro, Brazil
- Genres: Rock, MPB, pop rock, blues rock
- Length: 37:08
- Label: Philips
- Producers: Ezequiel Neves; Nilo Romero

Cazuza chronology
Ideologia (1988)	O Tempo Não Para (1988)	Burguesia (1989)

O Tempo Não Para is the first solo live album by Brazilian singer-songwriter Cazuza, released in 1988 by Philips Records label.

== Background ==
The album was recorded during the Ideologia album tour on October 14, 15, and 16, 1988, at Canecão in Botafogo neighborhood in Rio de Janeiro. At that time, Cazuza was already battling AIDS. According to journalist Clara Menezes of the newspaper O Povo, during his final performance, which took place on January 24, 1989, he had to return to his dressing room to receive oxygen.

The concert was directed by Ney Matogrosso, who is also a singer and features hits from throughout his solo career and his time with Barão Vermelho, as well as two covers of songs by other artists: Vida Louca Vida originally recorded by Lobão on the 1987 album Vida Bandida; and O Tempo Não Para, originally recorded by the band Hanói-Hanói on the 1988 album Fanzine.

The album features songs by musicians such as Cazuza, Roberto Frejat, Lobão, Leoni, and Ezequiel Neves.

== Track listing ==
No.	Title	Writer(s)	Length
1.	"Vida Louca Vida"	Lobão, Bernardo Vilhena	4:19
2.	"Boas Novas"	Cazuza	2:46
3.	"Ideologia"	Roberto Frejat, Cazuza	4:11
4.	"Todo Amor Que Houver Nessa Vida"	Roberto Frejat, Cazuza	2:50
5.	"Codinome Beija-Flor"	Cazuza, Ezequiel Neves, Reinaldo Arias	2:52
6.	"O Tempo Não Pára"	Arnaldo Brandão, Cazuza	4:39
7.	"Só as Mães São Felizes"	Roberto Frejat, Cazuza	3:46
8.	"O Nosso Amor A Gente Inventa (Estória Romântica)"	Rogério Meanda, Cazuza, João Rebouças	3:33
9.	"Exagerado"	Cazuza, Ezequiel Neves, Leoni	4:53
10.	"Faz Parte do Meu Show"	Renato Ladeira, Cazuza	3:19
Total length:			37:08

== Release ==
The album was released by Phillips in December 1988 on vinyl, CD, and cassette. In 2022, the album was re-released as a deluxe CD edition and a vinyl edition, featuring 7 previously unreleased tracks, released by Universal Music Group.

== Critical reception ==
Journalist Dom Floriano, writing for the newspaper O Liberal, penned a positive review of the album. Floriano noted that: “If anyone has any doubt that Cazuza was the best thing to happen last year, just listen to O Tempo Não Para, this singer-songwriter’s new album. It’s a vinyl recording of one of the best concerts of the year, recorded in October during Cazuza’s run at Canecão and recently broadcast on TV Globo. The set list includes hits like Ideologia, Codinome Beija-Flor, O Nosso Amor a Gente Inventa, Exagerado, and Faz Parte do Meu Show. Cazuza makes poetry his main weapon, as he puts it in a line from the album’s title track: “But if you think I’m defeated, know that the dice are still rolling, because time doesn’t stop.”

== Legacy ==
The Argentine band Bersuit Vergarabat recorded a Spanish-language version of the song, titled El Tiempo No Para, on their 1992 album Y Punto.

In a poll conducted in May 2022, the album ranked 110th place a list of the 500 best Brazilian albums, according to a survey of more than 160 music experts conducted by the Discoteca Básica podcast. The album Ideologia is also mentioned in the 119th edition, making these the two solo albums by Cazuza cited in the poll. In 2022, on the occasion of the album’s re-release, Augusto Diniz wrote in CartaCapital magazine that “Cazuza’s only live album showcases a mature artist, singing well, influential, and unambiguous, with songs about love, life, rebellion, and politics.”

== In popular culture ==
In the 2004 film Cazuza: O Tempo Não Pára, directed by Sandra Werneck and Walter Carvalho, the actor Daniel Oliveira, who played Cazuza in the film, reenacts scenes from the concert performance of the song O Tempo Não Pára.

The 2025 documentary Cazuza: Good News, directed by Nilo Romero and Roberto Moret, explores footage from the Ideologia tour, as well as Cazuza’s circumstances during the recording of the album O Tempo Não Para.

== Personnel ==
The following music working in the album:

- Cazuza – lead vocals;
- Christiaan Oyens – drums;
- Nilo Romero – bass guitar;
- Ricardo Palmeira – electric guitar; acoustic guitar on "Faz Parte do Meu Show";
- Luciano Maurício – electric guitar, backing vocals;
- João Rebouças – keyboards, backing vocals;
- Widor Santiago – tenor saxophone;
- Jurema de Cândia – backing vocals;
- Jussara Lourenço – backing vocals.
