= ¡Globalquerque! =

Annual music festival in Albuquerque, New Mexico

¡Globalquerque! is an annual music festival held each September at the National Hispanic Cultural Center in Albuquerque, New Mexico. Along with evening concerts, the festival also features a free Global Fiesta community day on with workshops, films, presentations, inter-activities and performances, as well as the Global Village of Craft, Culture & Cuisine, open throughout all parts of the festival, and featuring international food, art and artisan crafts available for sale.

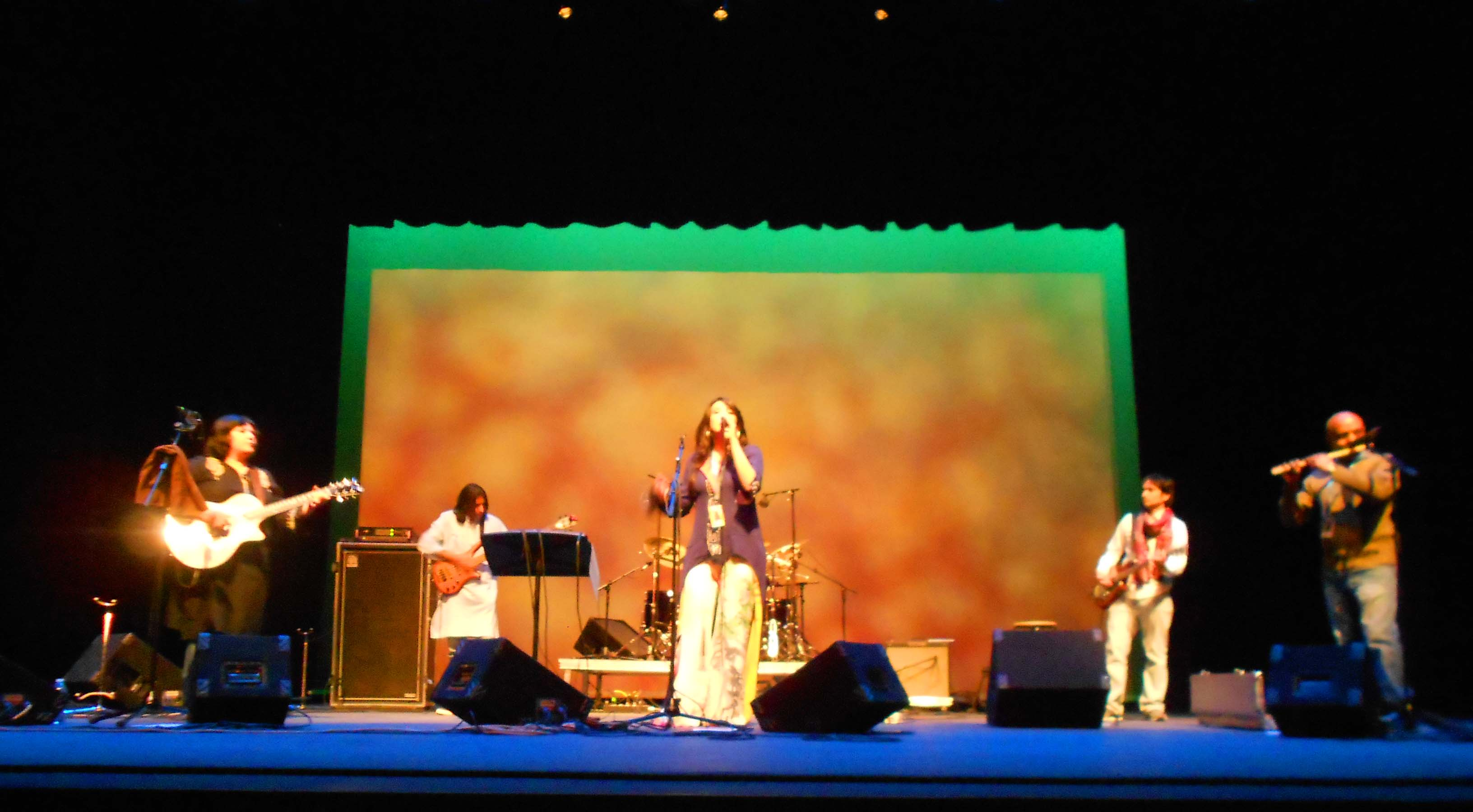
Zeb and Haniya in 2012

The performances also reach tens of thousands of listeners in the U.S. and Canada through live broadcasts on Native Voice 1 and Southwest Stages.

== History ==
The festival, first presented in 2005, has featured musicians from six continents. After an initial one-night event, ¡Globalquerque! expanded into a two-day festival with an attendance of over 4,000.

== Performers ==
Acts from around the world that have performed at previous editions of ¡Globalquerque! include:

- 17 Hippies
- Jojo Abot
- Afro-Cuban All Stars
- Kiran Ahluwalia
- Alborz Trio
- Rahim AlHaj
- A Moving Sound
- Anda Union
- aneXo al Norte
- Anjani's Kathak Dance of India
- Antonia Apodaca
- Khaïra Arby
- Aurelio
- Fareed Ayaz & Abu Muhammad
- Aynur
- Susana Baca
- Baka Beyond
- Baldino
- Baka Beyond
- Baraka Moon
- Jay Begaye
- Debashish Bhattacharya
- Bideew Bou Bess
- The Big Spank
- The Bills
- Black Eagle
- Blick Bassy
- Bombino
- Burkina Electric
- Calypso Rose
- Canteca de Macao
- Canzoniere Grecanico Salentino
- Cava
- Cellicion Zuni Dancers
- Charanga Cakewalk
- Chirgilchin
- Cimmarón
- Lankandia Cissoko
- Robert "Tree" Cody & Native Wisdom Dance Theatre
- Coreyah
- The Cowboy Way
- Cuarenta y Cinco
- Curumin
- DahkaBrahka
- Rocky Dawuni
- Maria de Barros
- Delgres
- Deolinda
- DePedro
- Kassé Mady Diabaté
- Prince Diabaté
- Lila Downs
- Dragon Art Studio
- Tony Duncan
- DVA
- EarthRise Sound System
- EastRiver Ensemble
- Youssra El Hawary
- Alejandro Escovedo
- Engine
- Liu Fang
- Vieux Farka Touré
- Majek Fashek and the Prisoners Of Conscience
- Federspiel
- Felix y Los Gatos
- Fémina
- Fiamma Fumana
- Samantha Fish
- The Flatlanderswith Tom Russell
- Forro in the Dark
- Frigg
- Fula Flute Ensemble
- Gaida
- Gamelan Encantada
- Genticorum
- Gjallarhorn
- Golem
- Marta Gómez
- Louie Gonnie
- Derek Gripper
- Hassan Hakmoun
- Hapa
- Joy Harjo
- Mickey Hart's Global Drum Project
- Jarlath Henderson
- Herencia de Timbiquí
- Hong Sung Hyun’s Chobeolbi
- Pascuala Ilabaca y Fauna
- Iļģi
- Indian Ocean
- Jah9
- Beto Jamaica
- Markus James and Wassonrai
- Jemez Seasonal Dancers
- Orlando Julius & The Afrosoundz
- Jupiter + Okwess
- Mor Karbasi
- Mamak Khadem
- Daniel Kahn & The Painted Bird
- Maya Kamaty
- Kardemimmit
- Kenge Kenge
- Kinky
- Kobo Town
- Oumar Konaté
- Assane Kouyate
- Krar Collective
- Kusun Ensemble
- LADAMA
- La Dame Blanche
- La Familia Vigil
- Las Flores del Valle
- Bettye LaVette
- Doyle Lawson & Quicksilver
- Lemon Bucket Orkestra
- Ricardo Lemvo & Makina Loca
- Les Yeux Noirs
- Yungchen Lhamo
- Little Cow
- Kevin Locke
- Lo Còr de la Plana
- Lo'Jo
- Lone Piñon
- Germán Lopéz
- Los Amigos Invisibles
- Los de Abajo
- Los Gaiteros de San Jacinto
- Los Galliñeros
- Los Martinez
- Los Matachines de Bernalillo
- Los Primos featuring Lenore Armijo
- Los Reyes de Albuquerque
- Los Texmaniacs
- Lura
- Betsayda Machado y La Parranda El Clavo
- Luísa Maita
- Thomas Mapfumo and The Blacks Unlimited
- Mariachi Mystery Tour
- Yolanda Martinez
- Emel Mathlouthi
- Frank McCulloch y Sus Amigos
- Melody of China
- Nacha Mendez
- Mexican Institute of Sound
- Emeline Michel
- Bill Miller
- Robert Mirabal
- Mokoomba
- Mono Blanco
- Ali Akbar Moradi Ensemble
- Gaby Moreno
- Shelley Morningsong
- Oliver Mtukudzi
- R. Carlos Nakai Earth Sounds Ensemble
- Nation Beat
- Native Roots
- Nawal
- Niyaz
- noJazz
- Non Stop Bhangara
- Nortec Collective Presents: Bostich + Fussible
- Nosotros
- Maarja Nuut
- Novalima
- Erkan Oğur's Telvin Trio
- Olodum
- Dona Onete
- Orchid Ensemble
- Oreka Tx
- Orkestra Mendoza
- Otava Yo
- Dwayne Ortega & The Young Guns
- Ozomatli
- Plena Libre
- Puerto Plata
- Razia
- Martha Redbone
- Red Stick Ramblers
- Reelroadъ
- Sofía Rei
- Rhythm of Rajasthan
- Rio Mira
- Leon Russell
- Buffy Sainte-Marie
- Saints & Tzadiks: Susan McKeown & Lorin Sklamberg
- Christine Salem
- Samarabalouf
- Poncho Sánchez
- Eli Secody
- Keith Secola Band
- Sergent Garcia
- Noura Mint Seymali
- Simon Shaheen
- Shooglenifty
- Sierra Leone's Refugee All Stars
- Sihasin
- Sky City Buffalo Ram Dance Group
- Slonovski Bal
- Jill Sobule
- Solas
- Söndörgő
- Sons of the Rio Grande
- Chango Spasiuk
- Nano Stern
- Rajab Suleiman & Kithara
- Supaman
- Koko Taylor
- Clark Tenakhongva
- Líber Terán
- Te Vaka
- Andrew Thomas
- Ti-Coca & Wanga-Nègès
- T.O. Combo
- Joe Tohonnie Jr. & The White Mountain Apache Crown Dancers
- Trad.Attack!
- Trio Da Kali
- Vân-Ánh Võ
- Väsen with Darol Anger & Mike Marshall
- ¡Viva la Pepa!
- Cedric Watson & Bijou Creole
- Savina Yannatou
- Yjastros
- Mary Youngblood
- Yuri Yunakov Ensemble
- Zeb and Haniya

== Reviews ==
The festival has been acclaimed as "one of the country's top world music festivals." National Geographic called ¡Globalquerque! "another great regional 'microfestival' that punches far above its weight... New Mexico's ¡Globalquerque! festival offers some of the most adventurous world music programming set against one of the Southwest's most beautiful cities... the festival is becoming a destination in its own right," while the U.K. publication Songlines hailed it as "world-class."
