= Ana Veydó =

Colombian joropo singer

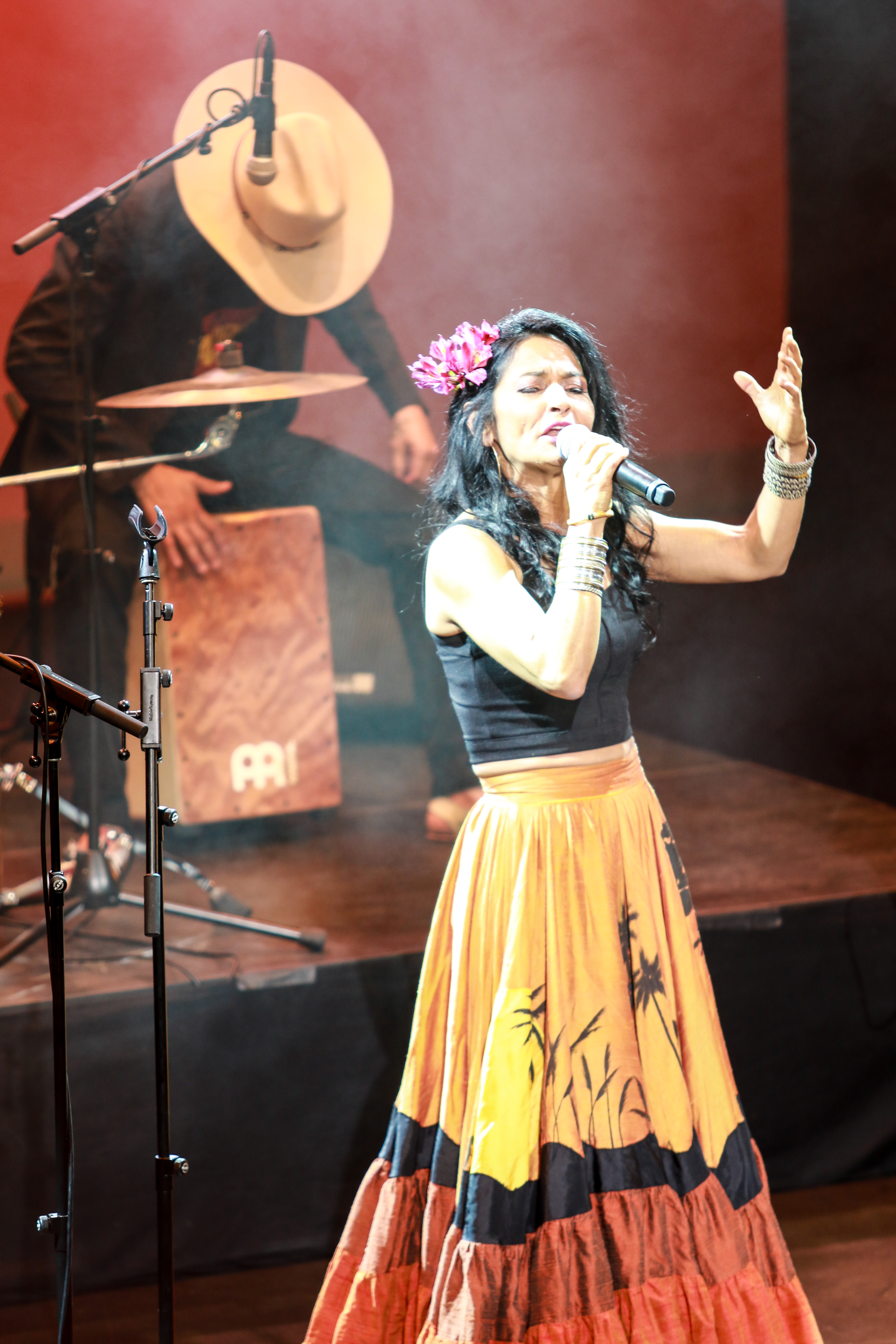
- Ana Veydó sings on a Cimarron performance

Background information
- Also known as: Ana Veydó
- Born: Anaveydober Ordóñez Triana
- Origin: Otanche, Boyacá
- Genres: Joropo
- Occupation: Singer
- Years active: 2000–present
- Label: Smithsonian Folkways Recordings

Anaveydober Ordóñez Triana (Otanche, Boyacá), better known as Ana Veydó, is a Colombian joropo singer. She is the lead singer of Cimarron.

== Solo career ==
Ana Veydó began her solo career in joropo music festivals in Colombia. She was a pioneer in recio singing, a vocal style traditionally associated with Colombian and Venezuelan plainsmen.

Her first record production was Recio, a musical production with folklore classics such as María Laya, La guayaba, Las ramas del guayabo, El Cimarrón, songs by artists such as Ángel Custodio Loyola and El Carrao de Palmarito.

Other songs by Ana Veydó were El Pajarillo, Seis por derecho, Zumbaquezumba and Corrío.

Her second album, Las dueñas del canto recio, presents the song La mujer llanera, which became well known in the plains of Colombia.

== Cimarron ==
After a few performances in Bogotá and a guest appearance in the Week of the Colombian Colony in Mexico City, in 2000 she was invited to perform with Cimarron band in their concerts.

In 2001, Ana Veydó travels with Cimarron to Washington for performances on behalf of Colombia at the Americartes Festival, an event organized by the Kennedy Center. The following year he took part in the III Meeting for the Promotion and Dissemination of Folklore of the Andean Countries held in Granada, Spain, and at the International Book Fair of Panama. Since then, he is the leading voice of Cimarron.

In 2004, the album Sí soy llanero (Smithsonian Folkways Recordings) takes Cimarron to the Grammy Awards, nominated for the Best Traditional World Music Album. Ana Veydó sings in all the later albums of Cimarron. Welsh harpist Catrin Finch accompanies her voice in 2007 production Catrin Finch and Cimarron Live YN BYW. Since 2011, with the release of the album ¡Cimarrón! Joropo music from the Plains of Colombia, the band tours around Europe, United States, Asia, America and the Middle East.

Ana Veydó is a joropo dancer too. She sang and danced on world music festivals such as Smithsonian Folklife Festival, WOMEX Festival, WOMAD Festival, Lake Eden Arts Festival, Rainforest World Music Festival, Paléo Festival, Glatt & Verkehrt, Festival Músicas do Mundo, Festival Rio Loco, Festival Mawazine, Rajasthan International Folk Festival, Førde International Folk Music Festival, Sfinks Mixed, Flamenco Biennale Nederland, Lotus World Music & Arts Festival, National Cowboy Poetry Gathering, Utah Arts Festival, San Francisco International Arts Festival, Globalquerque, Festival International de Lousiane, Festival Nuit du Suds, Zomer van Antwerpen, Abu Dhabi Culture & Heritage y Festival México Centro Histórico.

== Mataguayabo ==
In 2007, Ana Veydó released her third solo album, Mataguayabo. The album presents songs such as La cocina de mi mamá, whose lyrics speak of women lifestyle and motherhood across the Colombian-Venezuelan plains.

Mataguayabo is a lovesong with a melodic background. This album also includes songs such as Llorar no es malo, A flor de piel and Lágrimas y recuerdos.

Ana Veydó takes back her old songs as Pajarillo, El Gavilán, Seis por derecho, El día que abandone el Llano, Llano y Recuerdo, Primita hermana and El conejo y el picure, a children's song about the tales of Tío Tigre and Tío Conejo with which grandparents on the plains amused their grandchildren.

== Discography ==
Year	Album	Record label
2002	Recio	Independent
2004	Sí, soy llanero	Smithsonian Folkways Recordings
2004	Las dueñas del canto recio	Independent
2007	Mataguayabo	Independent
2007	Catrin Finch and Cimarron Live YN BYW	Astar Artes Recordings
2011	¡Cimarrón! Joropo music from the Plains of Colombia	Smithsonian Folkways Recordings
