= La Caravana Mágica =

Musical Album created by Gustavo Cordera

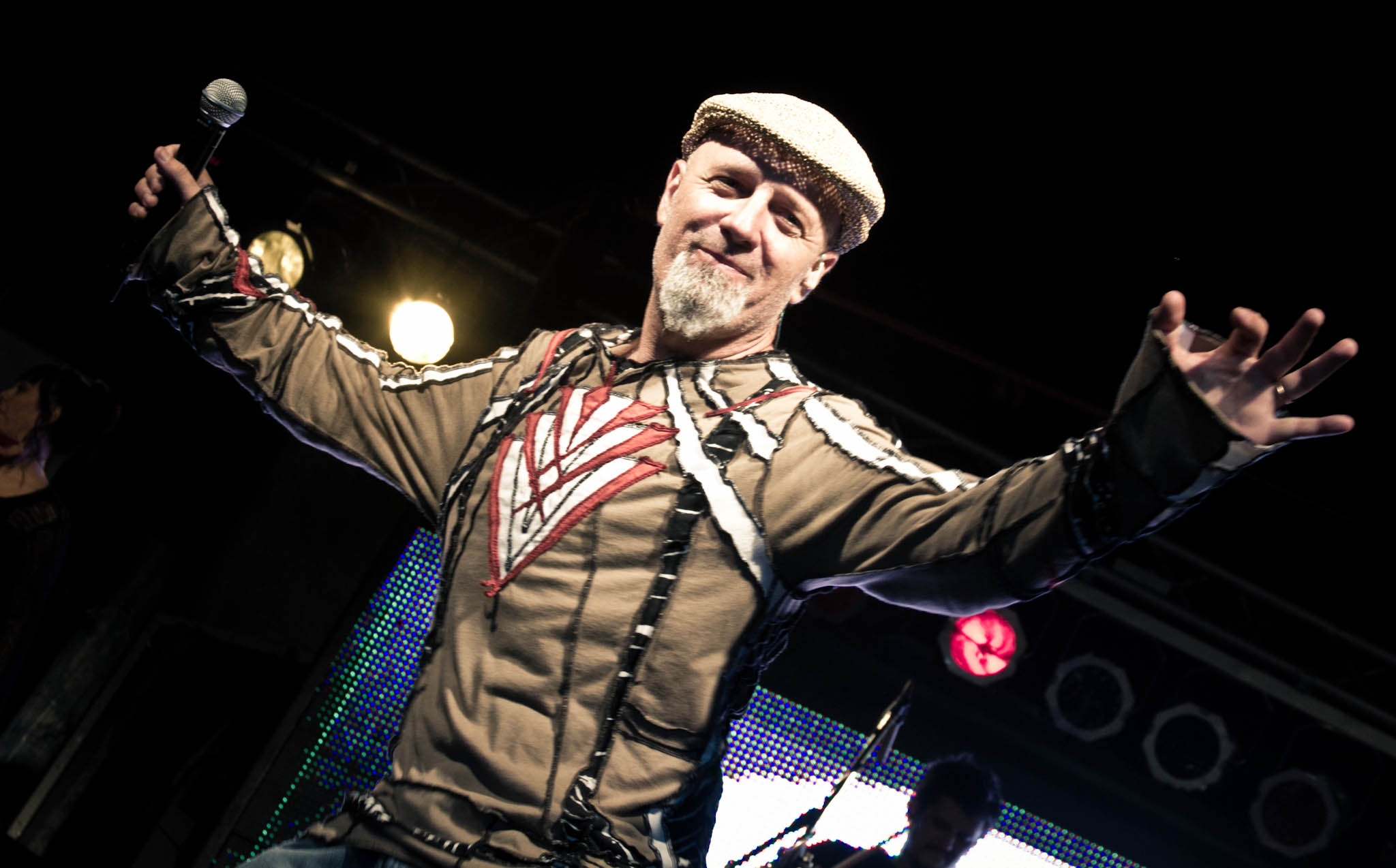
- Gustavo Cordera in 2011.

Background information
- Origin: Buenos Aires, Argentina
- Genres: Latin Rock; Alternative rock Cumbia
- Years active: 2010–present
- Labels: Sony Music/Columbia Records
- Members: Gustavo Cordera; Stella Céspedes; Lele Perdomo; Chacho Píriz; Schubert Rodríguez; Pepe Oreggioni; Emiliano Pérez Saavedra; Soema Montenegro
- Past members: Matías Ruiz

La Caravana Mágica (in English: The Magic Caravan) is a project of Argentine rock created by Gustavo Cordera, former lead singer of consecrated alternative grouping Bersuit Vergarabat. Unlike his previous project, Cordera devised a project with its own imprint, more personal and romantic; convening a group diverse musicians, fusing modern electronic sounds such as cumbia, the Latin music and River Plate, with the energy of rock.

== Discography ==
Title	Album details
En la Caravana Mágica	Released: 2010; Label: Sony Music/Columbia Records; Format: CD, digital download
En la Caravana Mágica Vol. 2	Released: 2012; Label: Sony Music/Columbia Records; Format: CD, digital download
Cordera vivo	Released: 2014; Label: Sony Music; Format: CD, digital download
