= Orinoco (album) =

Studio album by Cimarrón
- Released: May 17, 2019

Cimarrón chronology
¡Cimarrón! Joropo music from the Plains of Colombia (2011)	Orinoco (2019)

Orinoco es is the third studio album by Colombian joropo band Cimarrón, released on May 17, 2019.

Orinoco was nominated for Best Folk Album at the 2019 Latin Grammy Awards.

== Recording ==
Orinoco was produced by Ana Veydó and Carlos Cuco Rojas and recorded in Cimarrón Studio in Bogotá, Colombia.

This was Cimarrón's first independent album after two studio albums produced by Smithsonian Folkways, Sí, soy llanero and ¡Cimarrón! Joropo music from the Plains of Colombia.

Orinoco features the sound of an old indigenous deer-skull whistle from Sikuani people from the Orinoco River.

== Critical reception ==
Upon its release, Orinoco received positive reviews from Billboard, Songlines and PopMatters.

Billboard praised the album for being "a contemporary resonance of joropo", while PopMatters recommended Orinoco as "good both for listeners craving foundational folk music from the album's namesake valley and those who yearn for the fresh and contemporary".

In the UK, Songlines placed the album on its Top of the World Album chart for November 2019.

In 2020, Cimarrón won the Songlines Music Awards for Best Group, after touring the United Kingdom alongside the Welsh harpist Catrin Finch.

== Orinoco World Tour ==
The Orinoco World Tour was a 10 countries world tour by Cimarrón in support of their album Orinoco.

The tour visited the United States, the United Kingdom, China, India, Lebanon, Algeria, the Dominican Republic and Colombia. The tour began on July 23, 2019, in Washington Kennedy Center, and ended on February 6, 2020, in London, UK.

Cimarrón performed at the National Centre for the Performing Arts in Beijing.

During the tour, the band's harpist and musical director Carlos Cuco Rojas died on January 10, 2020, in Bogotá. The band decided to continue with the tour to honor his memory.

== Track listing ==
1. "Cimarronadas"
2. "Auténtica Llanera"
3. "Cuerdas al Galope"
4. "Tonada de la Palomita"
5. "Zumbajam"
6. "Penitas de Mi Corazón"
7. "Parranda Quitapesares"
8. "Ponle Pasión"
9. "Caballo Viejo"
10. "Orinoco Suite
