= Carlos Cuco Rojas =

Colombian harpist (1954–2020)

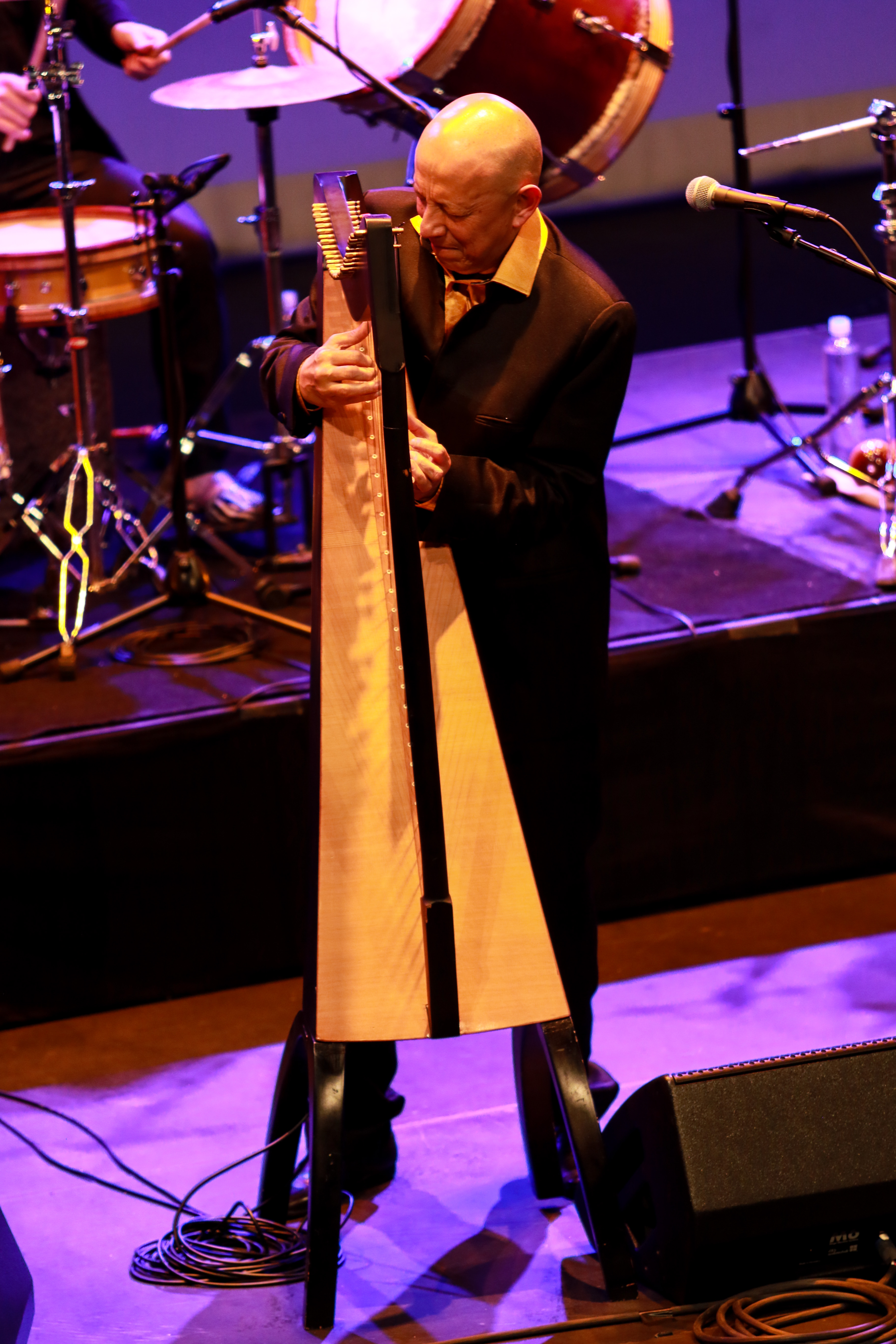
- Carlos "Cuco" Rojas playing harp on a Cimarron performance

Background information
- Also known as: Carlos "Cuco" Rojas
- Born: Carlos Rojas Hernández; March 28, 1954; San Martín, Meta, Colombia
- Died: January 10, 2020 (aged 65) Bogotá, Colombia
- Genres: Joropo
- Instrument: Harp
- Years active: 1978–2020
- Label: Smithsonian Folkways Recordings

Carlos Rojas Hernández (San Martín, Meta), better known as Carlos "Cuco" Rojas, (28 March 1954 – 10 January 2020) was a Colombian harpist and songwriter of joropo. He was the director of Colombian band Cimarron.

== Music career ==
=== Early life ===
Carlos Rojas Hernández was born in San Martín, Meta, in the plains of Colombia.

His musical career began at llanera music festivals.

In 1978 he recorded a LP with the singer Cholo Valderrama, which includes songs such as Quitaresuellos No. 2, Bonguero del Casanare and Viento Viajero.

=== Nobel Prize in Literature ===
The harpist Carlos "Cuco" Rojas was part of the Colombian folkloric musicians that accompanied writer Gabriel García Márquez to receive the Nobel Prize in Literature in Stockholm, Sweden.

=== Cimarron ===
With Carlos "Cuco" Rojas and Ana Veydó as bandleaders, Cimarron performed on world music festivals like Smithsonian Folklife Festival, WOMEX Festival, WOMAD, LEAF Festival, Rainforest World Music Festival, Paléo Festival, Glatt & Verkehrt, Festival Músicas do Mundo, Festival Rio Loco, Festival Mawazine, Rajasthan International Folk Festival, Førde International Folk Music Festival, Sfinks Mixed, Flamenco Biennale Nederland, Lotus World Music & Arts Festival, National Cowboy Poetry Gathering, Utah Arts Festival, San Francisco International Arts Festival, Globalquerque, Festival International de Lousiane, Festival Nuit du Suds, Zomer van Antwerpen, Abu Dhabi Culture & Heritage, Festival México Centro Histórico and other scenarios around Europe, United States, Asia, America and Middle East.

Cimarron has performed on 30 countries: United States, Spain, Portugal, France, Belgium, Netherlands, Switzerland, Norway, England, Czech Republic, Austria, Slovenia, Croatia, Wales, Morocco, Arab Emirates, India, China, Japan, Malaysia, Rajasthan, Mexico, Nicaragua, Panama, Colombia, Ecuador, Argentina, Chile and Uruguay.

== Folklife researching ==
Carlos Rojas Hérnandez was a folklife researcher too. He has some publications about cultural and musical tradition of the plains of Colombia and Venezuela.

He worked as an advisor to the Music Division of the Ministry of Culture of Colombia.

== Discography ==
Year	Album	Record label
2004	Sí, soy llanero	Smithsonian Folkways Recordings
2007	Catrin Finch and Cimarron Live YN BYW	Astar Artes Recordings
2011	¡Cimarrón! Joropo music from the Plains of Colombia	Smithsonian Folkways Recordings
2019	Orinoco	Independent
