= Benally =

Benally is a surname derived from the Navajo word binálí meaning "his grandchild". Notable people with the surname include:

- Klee Benally (born 1975), Navajo musician
- Jeneda Benally (born 1980), Navajo musician
- Jennifer D. Benally, American politician
- Wenona Benally, American politician
