= Soema Montenegro =

Argentine singer-songwriter (born 1978)

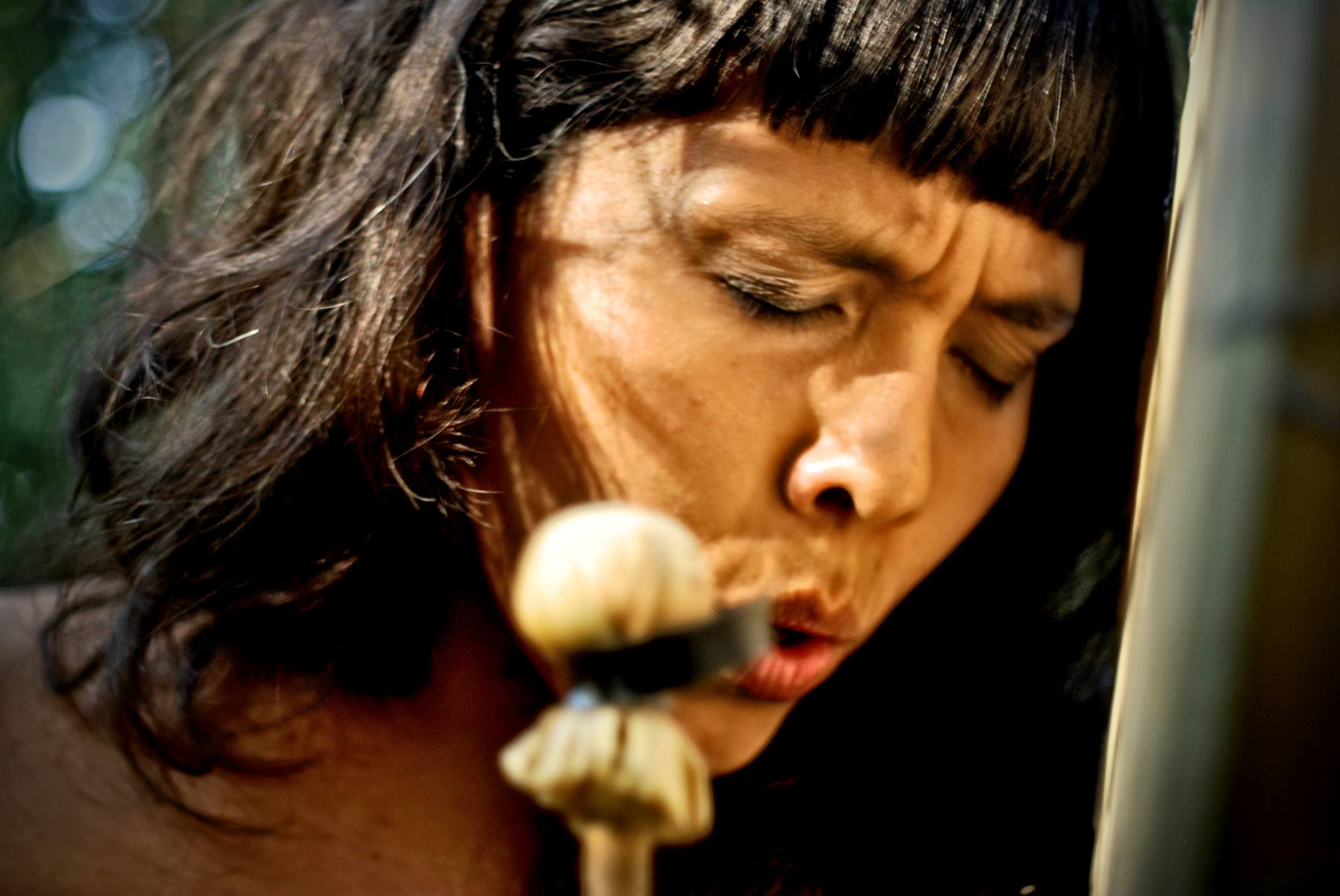

Background information
- Born: 7 December 1978 (age 46); Buenos Aires, Argentina
- Genres: Folk, experimental,
- Occupation(s): Musician, composer,
- Instrument(s): Vocals, guitar, cuatro venezolano, caya chayera
- Years active: 2008–present
- Labels: Noseso Records, Western Vinyl, Acqua Records, Sura Music
- Website: www.soemamontenegro.com

Soema Montenegro (born 7 December 1978 in LaFerrere, Buenos Aires) is an Argentine singer-songwriter. In 2001 she integrated Piel del Sur, a group directed by Susy Shock. In 2002, along to Maisa, Pereira and Hari M., she founds the trio of improvisation vocal Adivina. This group became the base of experimentation and research work and the space where it formed like singer and improviser during five years in parallel to its formal studies of composition in the Conservatory Alberto Ginastera. In 2008, and as a soloist, she released her first album Uno Una Uno (Noseso Records).

In 2010 she made her first international shows performing at the Instituto Cervantes de Casablanca in Morocco, Petit Bain in Paris and Cave Citadelle in Zurich.

In April 2011 she participated in the International Festival of Folklore Buenos Aires (FIFBA) and later, in June, shortly after the US edition of her album Passionaria (Western Vinyl), she was selected to participate in the MICA showcases Of Cultural Industries of Argentina). In 2011 she released her second CD, Passionaria, produced jointly by multi-instrumentalist Jorge Sottile, who was in charge of the musical articulation of an album full of nuances where the variety and uniqueness of timbres abound and producer Juan Ignacio Serrano known as Juanito El Cantor.

During 2012 she participated of the Argentine section Late Night Argentina in Brisbane Festival, Australia, next to 34 Puñaladas and Franco Luciani. Then in November she made her first performances in Chile where she shared concerts with Pascuala Ilabaca. During 2013 she participated in the La Casita Out Door Festival in Lincoln Center New York, USA. She made her second European tour, invited by Festival Voix de Femmes, Belgium, recorded a folk record with the Mosaik musical research group in Warsaw, Poland. It was presented in Bilbao and Morocco.

During 2014 she recorded her third album Ave del Cielo, which is presented in September–October in Buenos Aires. With her new group called El Conjuro she gave concerts and seminars in different cities of the country. This album was also produced by Juan Ignacio Serrano and Jorge Sottile. During 2015 she continues to present her third album Ave del Cielo, in quintet format. In July of this year she made her third European tour, playing in important music festivals around the world, such as Pirineos Sur, Spain and Festival Músicas do Mundo, Portugal. It is part of the collective Se Trata de Nosotras initiative of the Nation's Culture and the Committee against Trafficking in Persons, sharing stage with important singers and composers of the current scene as Liliana Herrero, Roxana Carabajal, Luciana Jury, Miss Bolivia, among other. She was summoned to participate in the Cycle and movement Playing for Change Argentina. During 2016 Soema participates in the Michelberger Music Festival in Berlin, a unique festival of its kind, where 80 artists from different parts of the world meet to perform unpublished works in joint collaboration.

== Discography ==
- Uno Una Uno (2008)
- Passionaria (2011)
- Ave del Cielo (2014)
- Camino a la Templanza (2019)
- Círculo Radiante (2023)

== Collaborations ==
- Gustavo Cordera - En la Caravana Mágica (2010)
- Lulacruza - Circular Tejido (2010)
- Páramo - Lejanía (2011)
- Teto Ocampo - Mucho Indio (2012)
- Gustavo Cordera - En la Caravana Mágica Vol.2 (2012)
- Sándalo Orquesta - Sándalo Orquesta (2012)
- Me darás mil hijos - Santo Remedio (2013)
- Juanito El Cantor - El Canto de las Ballenas (2014)
- Se Trata de Nosotras (2014)
- Susy Shock - Buena vida y poca verguenza (2014)
- El camino de Leda (2017)
