= La Revuelta =

Studio album by Bersuit Vergarabat
- Released: 27 February 2012
- Recorded: 2011–2012; Estudios Mondomix (Bs.As.)
- Genre: Rock en español
- Length: 39:26
- Label: Sony Music Argentina
- Producer: Cachorro López

Bersuit Vergarabat chronology
? (2007)	La Revuelta (2012)	El Baile Interior (2014)

Singles from La Revuelta
- 1. "Cambiar El Alma"

La Revuelta is the tenth album by the Argentine rock band Bersuit Vergarabat. This is the first album recorded by Bersuit after a hiatus, and without the main singer and one of the founders of the band, Gustavo Cordera.

The album was produced with the collaboration of Argentinian singers Andrés Calamaro, Vicentico and Chano from Tan Biónica band.

== Track listing ==
No.	Title	Writer(s)	{{{extra_column}}}	Length
1.	"Cambiar El Alma [Change The Soul]"	Righi, Céspedes		3:34
2.	"No Te Olvides [Do Not Forget]"	Céspedes		3:50
3.	"Así Es [Is Like This]"	Céspedes		3:32
4.	"Dios Te Salve [God Save You]"	Suárez, Céspedes, Righi		3:28
5.	"Es Solo Una Parte [Is Only A Part]"	Verenzuela		2:55
6.	"La Serpiente [The Snake]"	Martín, Subirá, Righi, Verenzuela, Suárez, Céspedes, Sbarbatti		3:09
7.	"El Motor"	Céspedes, Sbarbatti, Suárez, Righi		3:00
8.	"Santa Cecilia" (featuring Vicentico)	Martín	Vicentico	2:53
9.	"En El Muelle [In The Pier]"	Céspedes		3:53
10.	"Cargamos [We Load]"	Verenzuela		4:27
11.	"Afónico [Aphonic]"	Céspedes		2:43
12.	"La Revuelta [The Revolt]"	Verenzuela, Suárez, Righi, Martín, Céspedes, Subirá, Sbarbatti		2:02

== Personnel ==
- Alberto Verenzuela – guitar, vocals
- Oscar Humberto Righi – guitar
- Carlos E. Martín – drums
- Rene Isel Céspedes – bass, vocals
- Daniel Suárez – vocals
- Germán Sbarbatti – vocals
- Juan Subirá – keyboards
