= El Baile Interior =

Studio album by Bersuit Vergarabat
- Released: 2014
- Recorded: 2014
- Genre: Rock en Español
- Producer: Cachorro López

Bersuit Vergarabat chronology
La Revuelta (2012)	El Baile Interior (2014)	La Nube Rosa (2016)

El Baile Interior is the twelfth album by the Argentine rock band Bersuit Vergarabat. It is the second album recorded by Bersuit without the main singer and one of the founders of the band, Gustavo Cordera.

== Track listing ==
No.	Title	Writer(s)	Length
1.	"Huayno 14"	CHECK CD	3:33
2.	"Me voy [I'm leaving]"	CHECK CD	3:11
3.	"Ahí va Chavela [There Goes Chavela]"	CHECK CD	4:08
4.	"Cuatro Vientos [Four Winds]"	CHECK CD	3:07
5.	"Para Bailar [To Dance]"	CHECK CD	3:21
6.	"Tilcara en Carnaval [Tilcara On Carnival]"	CHECK CD	2:50
7.	"La próxima curda [The Next Kurdish]"	CHECK CD	4:03
8.	"Hay Pelado para todas [There Are Bald For Everything]"	CHECK CD	2:39
9.	"De Tripas Corazón [From Guts, Heart]"	CHECK CD	3:43
10.	"La Señora [The Lady]"	CHECK CD	2:31
11.	"Ayer Se Cortó la luz [The Power Went Out Yesterday]"	CHECK CD	3:15
12.	"Para Luis [For Louis]"	CHECK CD	2:47

== Personnel ==
- Alberto Verenzuela – guitar, vocals
- Oscar Humberto Righi – guitar
- Carlos E. Martín – drums
- Rene Isel Céspedes – bass, vocals
- Daniel Suárez – vocals
- Germán Sbarbatti – vocals
- Juan Subirá – keyboards
