= O Tempo Não Pára (song) =

"O Tempo Não Para"

Single by Cazuza

from the album O Tempo Não Para
- Language: Portuguese
- Recorded: October 1988
- Genre: Rock
- Length: 4:37
- Label: PolyGram; Universal Music
- Songwriters: Cazuza, Arnaldo Brandão
- Producers: Ezequiel Neves, Nilo Romero

O Tempo Não Para (in English: Time Doesn't Stop) is a Brazilian rock song, created by the singer Cazuza, in collaboration with Arnaldo Brandão in 1988. It is the sixth issue that is part of their self-titled live album, O Tempo Não Para.

== Words and meaning ==
The lyrics cover the artist's life from his birth and dedicate one of its verses to the media of his country; that had considered him dead early in his later years, when the author was dying of AIDS. It is, in itself, a complaint about the irritation of Cazuza with a society that criticized both his lifestyle and his illness, his vices and sexual orientation, and at the same time it is proposed as a critique of the exploitation of his image in media. Along with the songs "Exagerado" and "Ideologia", "O Tempo Não Para", it is considered one of his greatest hits as a solo artist.

== Covers ==
- In 1992, Argentina's rock band Bersuit Vergarabat, released his first studio album, Y Punto; and it included a Spanish adaptation of "O Tempo Não Para", entitled "El tiempo no para", which became a classic Argentine rock. In his honor, Gustavo Cordera sings one of the song's verses in the live version in Portuguese in 2002.
- In 2018, Brazilian singer Elza Soares recorded a cover of "O Tempo Não Para" to be included in O Tempo Não Para telenovela soundtrack.
