= La nube rosa =

La Nube Rosa

Studio album by Bersuit Vergarabat
- Released: 2016
- Recorded: October – January 2015/2016
- Genre: Rock en español
- Producer: Pepe Céspedes

Bersuit Vergarabat chronology
El Baile Interior (2014)	La Nube Rosa (2016)

La Nube Rosa is the 13 album by the Argentine rock band Bersuit Vergarabat. The first album recorded without guitarist Oscar Righi.

== Track listing ==
No.	Title	Writer(s)	Length
1.	"Aquí estamos [Here we are]"	CHECK CD	4:25
2.	"Carcel, hospital o muerte [Jail, hospital or death]"	CHECK CD	3:11
3.	"Por si pasa [In case it happens]"	CHECK CD	3:58
4.	"Que hable de vos [Speaks about you]"	CHECK CD	3:05
5.	"Como decirte [How do I tell you]"	CHECK CD	3:25
6.	"El taparrollos"	CHECK CD	3:10
7.	"Corazonada [Hunch]"	CHECK CD	2:44
8.	"La máquina de impedir [The impede machine]"	CHECK CD	3:17
9.	"La nube rosa [The pink cloud]"	CHECK CD	3:35
10.	"No vengan [Don't come]"	CHECK CD	4:30
11.	"Apunado [Stabbed]"	CHECK CD	4:07
12.	"Agradezco [Thankful]"	CHECK CD	3:12
13.	"Obstinato"	CHECK CD	3:16

== Personnel ==
- Alberto Verenzuela – guitar, vocals
- Oscar Humberto Righi – guitar
- Carlos E. Martín – drums
- Rene Isel Céspedes – bass, vocals
- Daniel Suárez – vocals
- Juan Subirá – keyboards
