= Baldino =

Baldino is a surname which is shared by several notable people, including:

- Frank Baldino Jr. (1953–2010), American entrepreneur, co-founder of Cephalon
- Matthew Baldino, American rower, competing at world-class level in the 1970s
- Phyllis Baldino, American cross-genre artist
