= Klee Benally =

- Born: 6 October 1975; Flagstaff, Arizona, United States
- Died: 30 December 2023 Phoenix, Arizona, United States
- Genres: Punk rock, alternative rock
- Occupations: Singer-songwriter, musicians, artist, activist, silversmith, filmmaker
- Instruments: Vocals, guitar

Klee Benally (1975–2023) was a Diné Indigenous anarchist, activist, author, musician, and environmentalist from the Navajo Nation.

== Early life ==
Benally was born in Black Mesa, Arizona to Jones and Berta Benally. They were from the Tódích’íi’nii and Wandering People clans. Their father, Jones, was a traditional Diné and their mother, Berta is of Russian-Polish Jewish descent. Klee grew up with the traditions of their father. During their childhood, Klee's family was forcibly displaced due to a land dispute that resulted in thousands of Navajo people losing their homes. Benally spent most of their life in Kinlani (Flagstaff), Arizona.

== Activism ==
=== Anti-Colonialism ===
Klee used their works to advocate for anti-colonial Indigenous resistance. In their book, No Spiritual Surrender: Indigenous Anarchy in Defense of the Sacred, Benally argues for Indigenous anarchy to achieve total liberation of Nahasdzáán (Mother Earth). He also created the game Burn the Fort, where each player takes the role of an Indigenous warrior fighting to stop colonization of their land.

In 2014, Benally protested outside the Super Bowl against the use of Washington Football Team's name "Redskin", which some considered offensive to Native Americans. The name was changed in 2022.

=== Environmentalism ===
Benally advocated fiercely against the expansion of the Arizona Snowbowl Ski Resort and the use of treated wastewater to make snow, arguing that it was destroying the local ecosystem. They also protested against pumice and uranium mining and transport in the area, advocating the clean up of mines from the Cold War Era. Klee typically framed the struggle for environmental rights in the context of religious freedom for Indigenous peoples, stating that: "This is a struggle for cultural survival — the struggle to protect sacred spaces."

== Music ==
In 1989, when Benally was 14 years old he (now they) founded the punk rock band Blackfire with his (now their) siblings, Jeneda and Clayson. The band mixed traditional Navajo chants and music with protest songs about the oppression of Indigenous people. Benally was the band's guitarist. The band's first EP called Blackfire was released in 1994 and produced by CJ Ramone. In 2002, the band released its first album, One Nation Under.

== Personal life ==
Klee was married to Princess Benally. Klee died at the age of 48, on December 30th, 2023 in a hospital in Phoenix. They are survived by their siblings, wife, and parents.
