= ¡Cimarrón! Joropo music from the Plains of Colombia =

¡Cimarrón! Joropo Music from the Plains of Colombia

Studio album by Cimarrón
- Released: 2011
- Genre: Joropo
- Label: Smithsonian Folkways Recordings
- Producer: Carlos Cuco Rojas Daniel Sheeny

Cimarrón chronology
Catrin Finch and Cimarron Live YN BYW (2007)	¡Cimarrón! Joropo Music from the Plains of Colombia (2011)	Orinoco (2019)

¡Cimarrón! Joropo Music from the Plains of Colombia is the second studio album by Colombian band Cimarron. The album won the Independent Music Award in 2012 for Best Latin Album.

== Recording ==
The album was produced by Carlos Cuco Rojas, harpist and founder of Cimarron, Daniel Sheeny and D.A Sonneborn. It was recorded and mixed by Pete Reinger and Carlos Cuco Rojas in Audio Productions Patrick Mildenberg, in Bogotá (Colombia). The mastering was done by Charlie Pilzer, at Airshow Mastering, in Springfield, Virginia.

== Tours ==
During 2011 and 2012, Cimarrón performed on Washington, D.C., New Delhi, Abu Dhabi, Rabat and French towns such as Strasbourg, Limoges, Massy, Arcachon and Montbeliard.

They also toured other locations throughout the United States, Switzerland, Portugal, Argentina, El Salvador and Nicaragua.

== Independent Music Awards ==
¡Cimarrón! Joropo Music from the Plains of Colombia won the 2012 Independent Music Award for Best Latin Album.

That same year the band was nominated for Best Latin Song, Best Instrumental Song and Best Music Video.

== Track listing ==
1. Joropo quitapesares
2. Vine a defender lo mío
3. El cimarrón
4. Zumbaquezumba tramao
5. Llanero siente y lamenta
6. El gavilán
7. Llanero soy
8. La tonada
9. Mi sombrero
10. El guate
11. Tierra negra
12. Mi llano ya no es el mismo
13. Cimarroneando

== Musicians ==
- Ana Veydó (Lead vocals)
- Carlos Cuco Rojas (Harpist and songwriter)
- Luis Eduardo Moreno “El Gallito Lagunero” (Vocals)
- Freiman Rolando Cárdenas Pulido (Vocals, percussion, dance)
- Óscar José Oviedo Osorio (Percussion, dance)
- Carlos Andrés Cedeño Delgado (Bass)
- Darwin Rafael Medina Fonseca (Cuatro)
- Ferney Rojas Cabezas (Bandola)
- Edison Fernando Torres Ramírez (Percussion)
