= Libertinaje =

Studio album by Bersuit Vergarabat
- Released: 1998
- Recorded: 1998; Estudios Panda: April 20–May 23; La Casa: June 3–July 14
- Genre: Rock en Español
- Length: 47:35
- Label: Surco/Universal Music
- Producer: Gustavo Santaolalla

Bersuit Vergarabat chronology
Don Leopardo (1996)	Libertinaje (1998)	Hijos del Culo (2000)

Libertinaje is the fourth studio album by the rock band Bersuit Vergarabat. It was released in 1998 on Universal Music. The album was recorded in the Estudios Panda (Buenos Aires) between April 20, 1998 and May 23, 1998, and in La Casa (Los Angeles) between June 3, 1998 and July 14, 1998.

== Track listing ==
1. "Yo Tomo" [I Drink] (Righi, Verenzuela, Cordera, Cépedes, Subirá, Martín) – 3:32
2. "A Los Tambores" [To The Drums] (Subirá, Céspedes, Martín, Cordera, Righi) – 3:22
3. "De Onda" (Verenzuela) – 3:01
4. "Se Viene" [It Comes] (Cordera, Verenzuela) – 3:25
5. "Murguita Del Sur" [South Murguita] (Cordera) – 4:16
6. "Sr. Cobranza" (De la Vega) – 4:19
7. "Vuelos" (Céspedes) [Flights] – 4:24
8. "Gente De Mierdas" [Shit People] (Cordera, Céspedes, Righi, Verenzuela, Martín, Subirá, García) – 2:46
9. "Sincerebro" (Cordera, Céspedes) – 3:27
10. "A Marça De Deux" (Cordera, Barcigaluppi) – 5:17
11. "C.S.M." (Subirá, Céspedes) – 2:40
12. "¿Qué Pasó?" [What Happened?] (Cordera, Martín) – 6:03

== Charts and sales ==
Country	Peak position	Certification	Sales/shipments
Argentina	1	4× Platinum	160.000
