= Sihasin =

Diné band

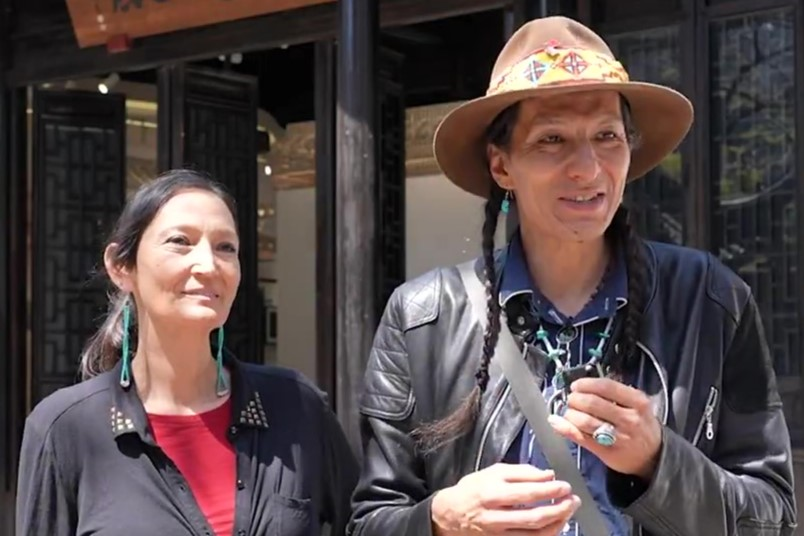
Jeneda and Clayson Benally

Sihasin is a Diné (Navajo) band consisting of brother and sister duo, Clayson and Jeneda Benally. The band's name, "Sihasin", translates to "hope" in the Diné language. The band is from Flagstaff, Arizona, and their music is based in Diné culture, activism and punk rock.

== Background ==
Clayson and Jeneda Benally are children of Jones Benally, a hoop dancer and traditional healer, and Berta Benally, a folk singer and activist. They grew up in Black Mesa during a land dispute between the Navajo Nation and Hopi, and the Peabody coal mining company, which resulted in the forced relocation of thousands of people. The activism they saw and participated in at the time later became an inspiration for their music.

In the 1990s, the siblings, along with their brother Klee, created a punk rock band called Blackfire when they were teenagers. In 2011, the band broke up. According to the siblings, while Blackfire was based on their anger at injustice, they created Sihasin to empower and inspire others to create change.

== History ==
After their former band Blackfire went on hiatus, the group formed in 2012, with Janeda on bass and Clayson on drums. They released their debut album, Never Surrender, in 2012 on Tacoho Records. In 2013, Sihasin performed at the Gathering of Nations for the first time.

In 2015, Sihasin's rock cover of "Winter Wonderland" was included on the album Punk Rock Christmas, released by Cleopatra Records. The song was later used in Hyundai's "Naughty or Nice" ad campaign in 2017.

Sihasin collaborated on The Okee Dokee Brothers' song "Sister Moon and Brother Sun", included on the 2017 album Saddle Up. The album was nominated for best children's album at the 2017 Grammy Awards. Sihasin's album, Fight Like a Woman, was released in 2018 by Tacoho Records, and recorded with producer Ed Stasium. In 2019, the album won "Best Rock Recording" at the Native American Music Awards.

During COVID-19, the band switched to performing online to replace in-person tours. In 2020, Sihasin performed as part of the Homegrown Concert series from the Library of Congress, which was streamed online due to the pandemic. In 2021, the band was selected by American Music Abroad, a cultural diplomacy program that shares American music internationally and is sponsored by the U.S. Department of State; as part of the program, they performed through international virtual tours, and they produced a single titled "We the People", which premiered digitally on July 4 in each American embassy.
