= Matthew Baldino =

American rower

Sport
- Sport: Rowing
Medal record
Men's rowing
Representing United States
World Rowing Championships
Gold medal – first place	1974 Lucerne	Lwt eight

Matthew Baldino is an American lightweight rower. He won a gold medal at the 1974 World Rowing Championships in Lucerne with the lightweight men's eight.
