= Y Punto =

Studio album by Bersuit Vergarabat
- Released: 1992
- Recorded: Moebio Studios: January–March, 1992
- Genres: Rock; Hard rock
- Length: 44:30
- Label: Belgrano Norte S.R.L.

Bersuit Vergarabat chronology
Y Punto (1992)	Asquerosa Alegría (1993)

Y Punto is the first album by the Argentine rock band Bersuit Vergarabat, released in 1992.

== Track listing ==
1. "El Tiempo No Para" (Cazuza, Arnaldo Brandão; vers. Gustavo Cordera, Carlos Enrique Martín) [Time Doesn't Stop] – 5:16
2. "La Papita" (Cordera) [The Potato] – 3:17
3. "Diez Mil" (Martín, Charly Bianco) [Ten Thousand] – 4:18
4. "Tuyu" (Cordera) – 4:45
5. "Homenaje A Los Locos Del Borda" (Cordera, Juan Subirá) [Homage to Borda's Madmen] – 4:00
6. "Venganza De Los Muertos Pobres (Afro)" (Cordera) [Revenge of the Poor Dead People] – 5:33
7. "Hociquito De Ratón" (Cordera) [Little Mouse Nose] – 2:35
8. "La Logia (Iambo-Iombo)" (Cordera, Bianco, Miguel Jara) [The Logia] – 4:00
9. "Como Nada Puedo Hacer" (Cordera, Pepe Céspedes) [Since There's Nothing I Can Do] – 5:38
10. "Sistema Al Mejor Postor" (Cordera) [System for the Highest Bidder] – 5:08

== Personnel ==
- Gustavo Cordera - vocals
- Charly Bianco – guitar
- Oscar Humberto Righi – guitar
- Carlos E. Martín – drums
- Rene Isel Céspedes – Bass, backing vocals
- Ruben Sadrinas – backing vocals
- Juan Subirá – keyboards
- Marcela Chedik – percussion
