= Sí, soy llanero =

Studio album by Cimarrón
- Released: 2004
- Genre: Joropo
- Label: Smithsonian Folkways Recording
- Producer: Carlos Cuco Rojas Daniel Sheeny

Cimarrón chronology
Sí, soy llanero (2004)	Catrin Finch and Cimarron Live YN BYW (2007)

Sí, soy llanero is the first studio album by Colombian band Cimarron.

This 2004 record production earned a Grammy nominee for Best Traditional World Music Album.

== Recording ==
The album was produced by Carlos "Cuco" Rojas, harpist and founder of Cimarron, and Daniel Sheeny, director of the non-profit record label Smithsonian Folkways Recordings.

It was recorded by Pete Reinger at Audio Productions Patrick Mildenberg, in Bogotá (Colombia). Reinger also mixed the album in Smithsonian Folkways. The mastering was done by Charlie Pilzer, at Airshow Mastering, in Springfield (Virginia).

== Tour ==
The songs on this album were performed live by Cimarron on stages such as the Smithsonian Folklife Festival (Washington), the National Cowboy Poetry Gathering (Elko, Nevada) and the International Book Fair of Panama.

== Grammy nomination ==
Sí, soy llanero was nominated for Best Traditional World Music Album in the 47th Annual Grammy Awards.

== Track listing ==
1. Llanero sí soy llanero
2. Los diamantes
3. Pajarillo
4. Un llanero de verdad
5. Los Merecures
6. Y soy llanero
7. Seis por derecho
8. El gaván restiao
9. Quitapesares
10. Atardecer en Arauca
11. Zumbaquezumba
12. María Laya
13. Puerto Carreño
14. Se me murió mi caballo
15. Las tres damas
16. Soy llanero pelo-piso
17. Pajarillo

== Musicians ==
- Ana Veydó (lead vocals)
- Carlos "Cuco" Rojas (harpist and composer)
- Luis Eduardo Moreno "El Gallito Lagunero" (vocals)
- Yesid Benites Sarmiento (Bandola)
- Omar Edgar Fandiño Ramírez (Maracas)
- Wilton Ernesto Games Balcárcel (Coplero)
- Hugo Antonio Molina Martínez (Bandola)
- Pedro Libardo Rey Rojas (Cuatro)
- Ricardo Zapata Barrios (Bass)
