= ? (Bersuit album) =

Studio album by Bersuit Vergarabat
- Released: 18 December 2007
- Recorded: July–October 2007
- Genre: Rock en Español
- Length: 49:34
- Label: Surco/Universal Music; Pussyfoot Records

Bersuit Vergarabat chronology
Bersuit (2006)	? (2007)	La Revuelta (2012)

Singles from ?
- 1. "Laten Bolas"; 2. "Ansiando Libertad"; 3. "De Ahi Soy Yo"

? is the ninth album by the Argentine rock band Bersuit Vergarabat. It was recorded from July to October 2007, and was released on 18 December 2007 by Pussyfoot Records.

== Recording and reception ==
"Laten Bolas" was performed live at concert near the Río de la Plata. The record is notable for maintaining the band’s eclectic musical identity while incorporating contemporary production elements of the mid-2000s Latin rock scene.

== Track listing ==
No.	Title	Writer(s)	Length
1.	"Laten Bolas [Beat Balls]"	Cordera, Céspedes, Matín, Subirá, Rigui, Verenzuela, Suarez, Sbarbati	3:50
2.	"De Ahí Soy Yo [From There I Am]"	Cordera, Martín, Céspedes, Alarcón	5:26
3.	"Mi Vida [My Life]"	Cordera, Martín, Alarcón, Céspedes	3:03
4.	"Ebrio De Sinrazón [Drunk With Unreason]"	Verenzuela	4:00
5.	"Rebelión [Rebellion]"	Cordera, Céspedes	3:43
6.	"Humor Linyera [Bum Mood]"	Subirá	3:32
7.	"Siempre Lo Mismo [Always The Same]"	Cordera, Céspedes	5:11
8.	"Luna Hermosa [Beautiful Moon]"	Subirá, Verenzuela	3:16
9.	"El Lechero [The Milkman]"	Cordera, Céspedes	4:02
10.	"No Me Paranoiqueen"	Cordera, Céspedes	4:15
11.	"Ansiando Libertad [Longing For Freedom]"	Cordera	4:21
12.	"El Guerrero [The Warrior]"	Cordera, Martín, Subirá, Céspedes	4:55

== Personnel ==
- Gustavo E. Cordera – lead vocals
- Alberto Verenzuela – guitar, vocals
- Oscar Humberto Righi – guitar
- Carlos E. Martín – drums
- Rene Isel Céspedes – bass, backing vocals
- Daniel Suárez – backing vocals
- Germán Sbarbatti – backing vocals
- Juan Subirá – keyboards
