= Fiamma Fumana =

Italian world music ensemble

Fiamma Fumana is an Italian world music ensemble. Formed in 1999 in Northern Italy, their name translates from Italian as "flame fog" or "fire mist". Their music mixes traditional Italian folk music with electronica. Starting out as a three-piece (Fiamma, Alberto, Marco), they added two members (Jessica, Medhin) for their second album, 2001's Home. The group played at the WOMAD festival and the CMJ music marathon in 2001, and the Detroit Festival of the Arts in 2002.

== Members ==
- Fiamma Orlandi - vocals
- Alberto Cottica - accordion (formerly of Modena City Ramblers)
- Marco Bertoni - electronics
- Lady Jessica Lombardi - recorder
- Medhin Paolos - vocals - electronics
- Missy Jay - DJ

== Discography ==
- 1.0 (Omnium Records, 2001)
- Home (Omnium, 2003)
- Contatto (Mescal Records, 2004)
- Onda (Mescal, 2006)
