= Asquerosa Alegría =

- Asquerosa Alegria

Studio album by Bersuit Vergarabat
- Released: 1993
- Recorded: April 5, 1993 – May 5, 1993
- Studio: Supersonico; Del Cielito; Panda
- Genre: Rock; Hard rock
- Length: 48:16
- Label: DBN
- Producer: Twetty González

Bersuit Vergarabat chronology
Y Punto (1992)	Asquerosa Alegría (1993)	Don Leopardo (1996)

Asquerosa Alegría is the second album by the Argentine rock band Bersuit Vergarabat, released in 1993.

== Track listing ==
No.	Title	Length
1.	"Fuera De Aca"	4:11
2.	"Sin Son"	4:59
3.	"Tu Pastilla Fue"	4:00
4.	"Clara"	5:05
5.	"Cha Cha Cha"	2:49
6.	"Ausencia De Estribillo"	2:35
7.	"Si Amanece"	4:22
8.	"Decile A Tu Mamá"	2:23
9.	"Balada De Guang Chang Kein"	0:46
10.	"Los Elefantitos"	5:14
11.	"Vamos, No Llegamos"	3:42
12.	"Nepore'y (Tu Ausencia)"	5:48
13.	"Buceando En El Riachuelo"	2:12
Total length:		53:06
