= Gustavo Cordera =

Argentine rock musician

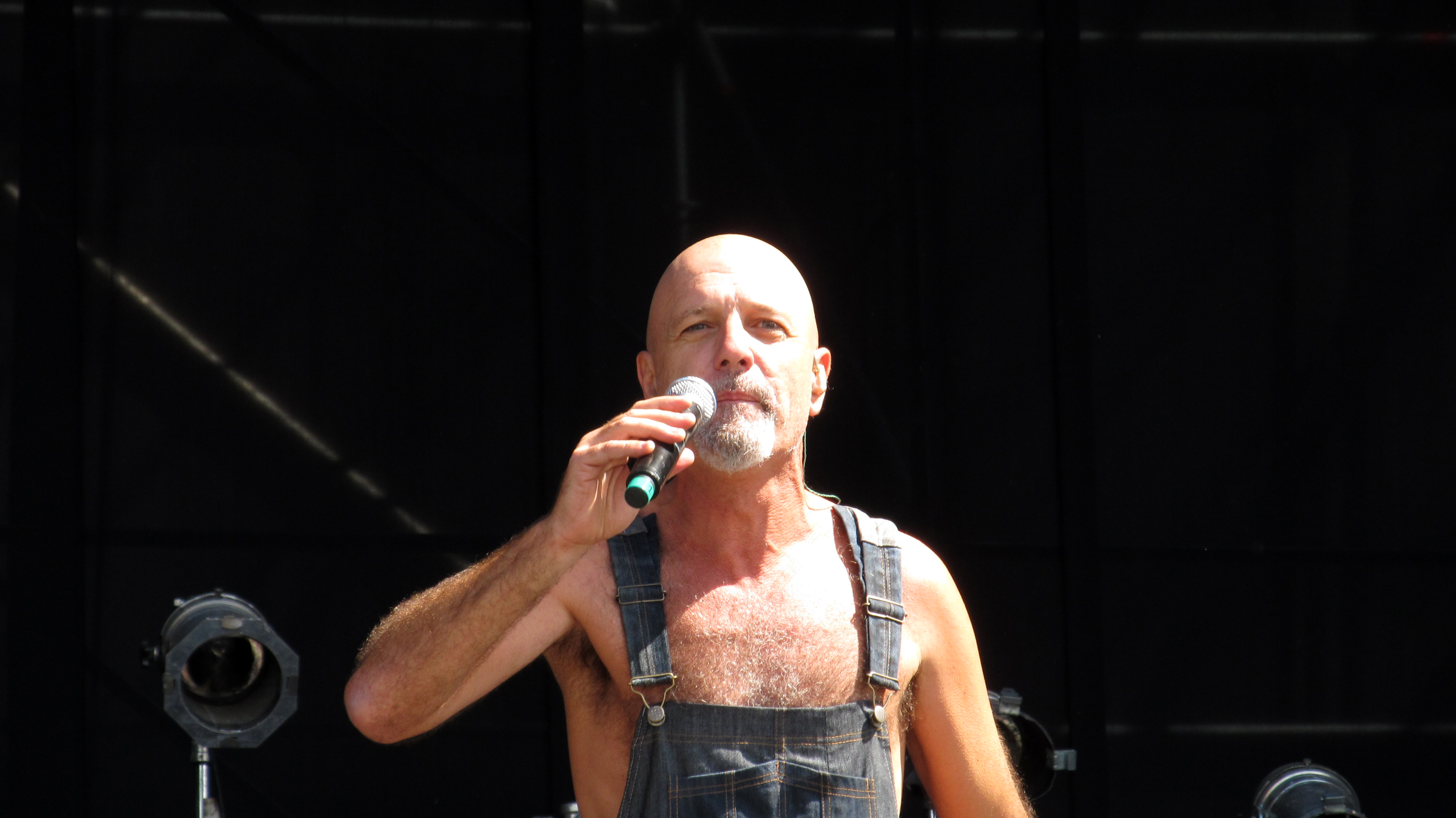
- Cordera in 2012

Background information
- Birth name: Gustavo Edgardo Cordera
- Also known as: Pelado, Chascas, Chaspas, Chasqui, Chaspi
- Born: September 15, 1961 (age 63); Avellaneda, Buenos Aires
- Origin: Argentina
- Genres: Alternative rock Cumbia; Candombe; Techno
- Occupation: Musician
- Instrument(s): Voice and guitar
- Years active: 1988–present

Gustavo Edgardo Cordera (born September 15, 1961 in Avellaneda, Buenos Aires) is an Argentine rock musician, best known as the ex frontman of the band Bersuit Vergarabat.

== Biography ==
Cordera's musical career began in 1988, when he was studying communications at the Universidad Nacional de Lomas de Zamora and running his own auto dealership, Cordera Bros. In the spring of that year, he visited Rio de Janeiro during Carnaval and was inspired to become a musician. Returning to Avellaneda, he sold his dealership, abandoned his studies, and shaved his head, an act which earned him the sobriquet Pelado (in English "Bald").

At la Casa de las Artes de la Vieja Avellaneda, a meeting place for musicians and artists, Cordera met keyboardist Juan Subirá and bassist Pepe Céspedes, and together they produced the songs "Masturbación en masa" ("Masturbation en masse") and "Hociquito de Ratón" ("Little Rat-Snout"). A year later, along with drummer Carlos Enrique Martín and guitarist Charly Bianco, they formed Bersuit, whose name was soon lengthened to Bersuit Vergarabat. During the early nineties they were joined by guitarist Oscar Righi, keyboardist Raúl Pagano, and vocalist Rubén Sadrinas. In 1992 they released the album Y Punto, and in 1993, Asquerosa Alegría. Both albums were well received.

The group's initial success was interrupted by internal changes, including the departure of Pagano, Sadrinas, and Bianco, and the arrival in 1994 of Alberto Verenzuela.

The group's lack of activity gave rise to rumors of a break-up. "It was the most depressing moment of my life", said Cordera. Though lacking a distributor, the group began working on its third album, tentatively titled "La historia de Don Leopardo y Vir Trompzio" (eventually released in 1996 as Don Leopardo). Though it was a commercial failure, the band recovered in 1998 with Libertinaje, followed by Hijos del Culo (2000) and De la Cabeza (2002), the latter recorded live at the Estadio Obras Sanitarias.

In 2004, they achieved great success with La Argentinidad al Palo. Their most recent release is Testosterona in 2005, whose track "Madre hay una sola" ("There is only one mother") reflects Cordera's environmentalism. On May 12, 2007, the band played at River Plate Stadium, in Buenos Aires, attended by over 60,000 people.

In 2009, Cordera decided to leave the band to start a solo project. In the same year, he released his first album titled "Suelto" (Loose). Nowadays, he leads his own project called "La Caravana Mágica"; which dabbles in musical genres such as cumbia, techno and rock.

Cordera is married and has three children and since 2006, he settled in Uruguay. In his spare time, he enjoys strength training. He loves football and he is a Lanús fan.

== Discography ==
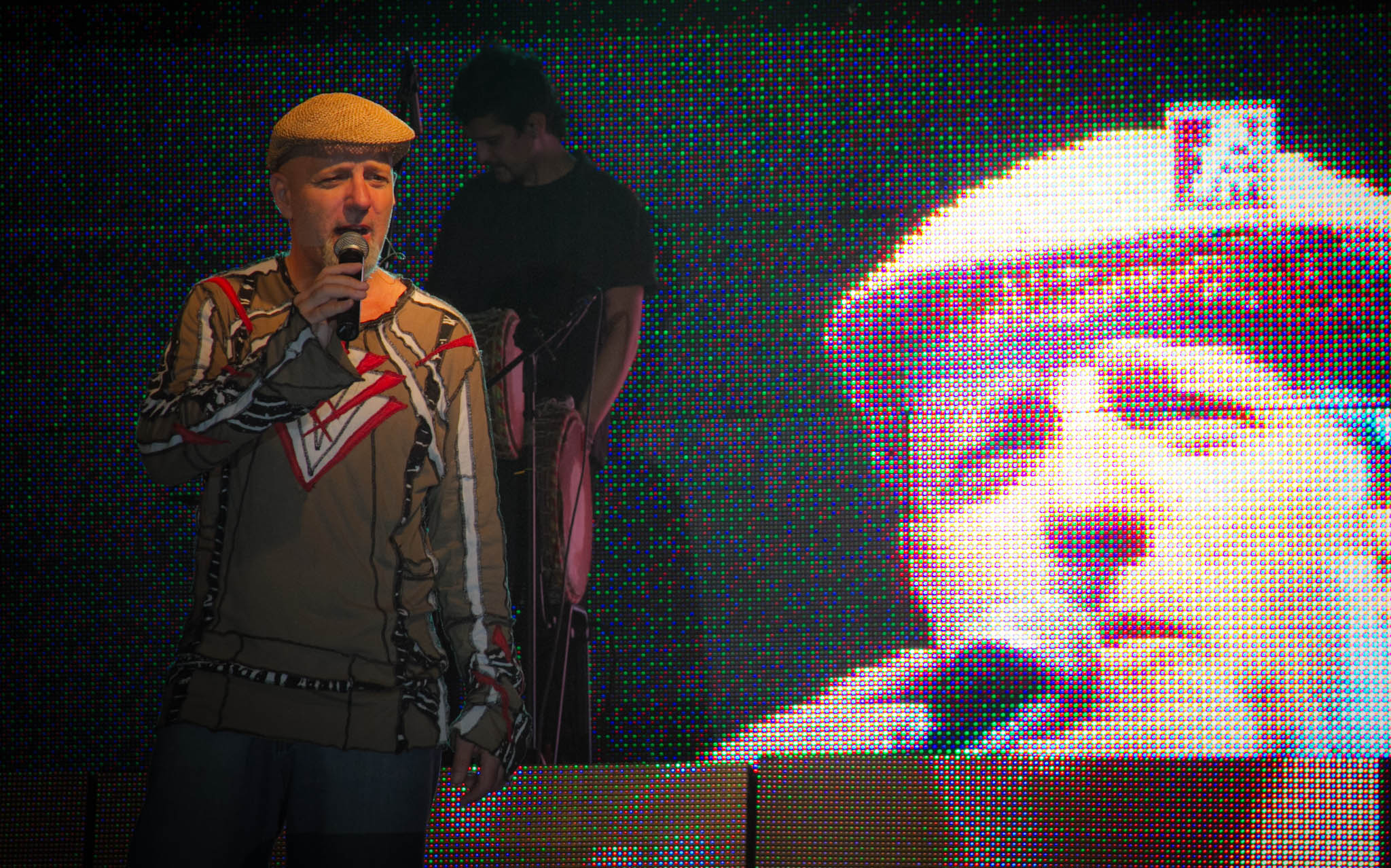
Gustavo Cordera.

=== Bersuit Vergarabat ===
- Y Punto - (1992)
- Asquerosa Alegría - (1993)
- Don Leopardo - (1996)
- Libertinaje - (1998)
- Hijos del Culo - (2000)
- De la Cabeza - (2002)
- La argentinidad al palo - (2004)
- Testosterona - (2005)
- Bersuit - (2006)
- ? - (2007)

=== Soloist ===
- Suelto - (2009)
- La Caravana Mágica (2010)
- La Caravana Mágica Vol.2 (2010)
- Tecnoanimal (2016)
