= Nawal (musician) =

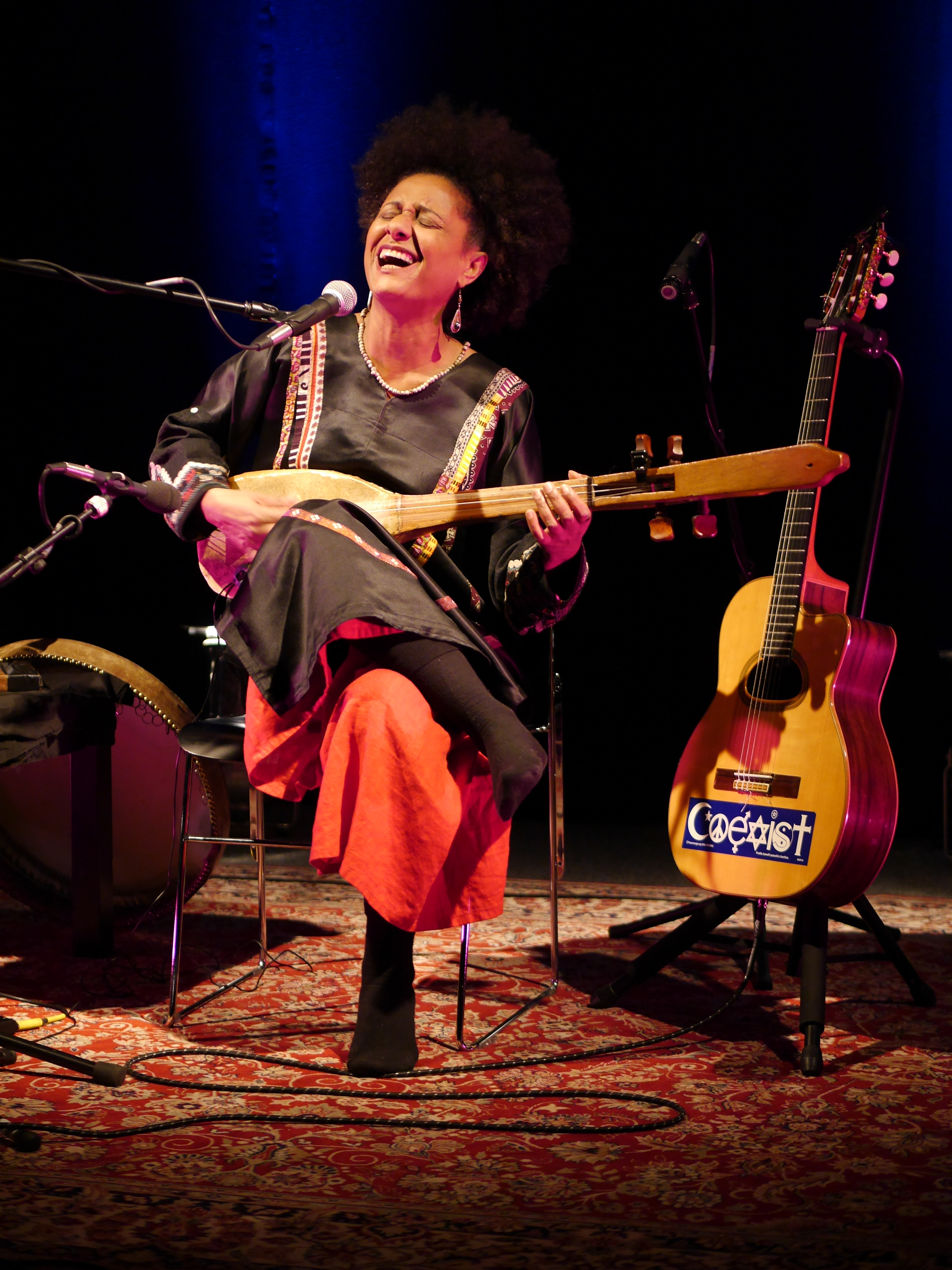
- Nawal performs in 2017
- Born: 1965 (age 60–61); Comoros
- Occupation: Musician

Nawal is a musician from Comoros whose music draws on traditional Comorian influences and incorporates sounds from African and Arabic culture.

== Life and career ==
Born into a musical family, she grew up with such sounds as dhikr (Sufi chanting) in mosques, twarab music, and popular music from the radio airwaves. She mixes Comorian rhythms with bantu polyphony, Indo-Arabian-Persian sounds and Sufi chanting into an acoustic roots-based fusion. She plays many instruments, including the guitar and qanbūs. She sings in Comorian, Arabic, French and English.

== Discography ==
- 2001: Kweli
- 2007: Aman
