= Festival International =

Festival International Festival International de Louisiane
- Status: Active
- Genre: Festival
- Date: April 22, 2026
- Ends: April 26, 2026
- Frequency: Annually
- Country: United States
- Inaugurated: July 2 – 5, 1987
- Website: https://www.festivalinternational.org/

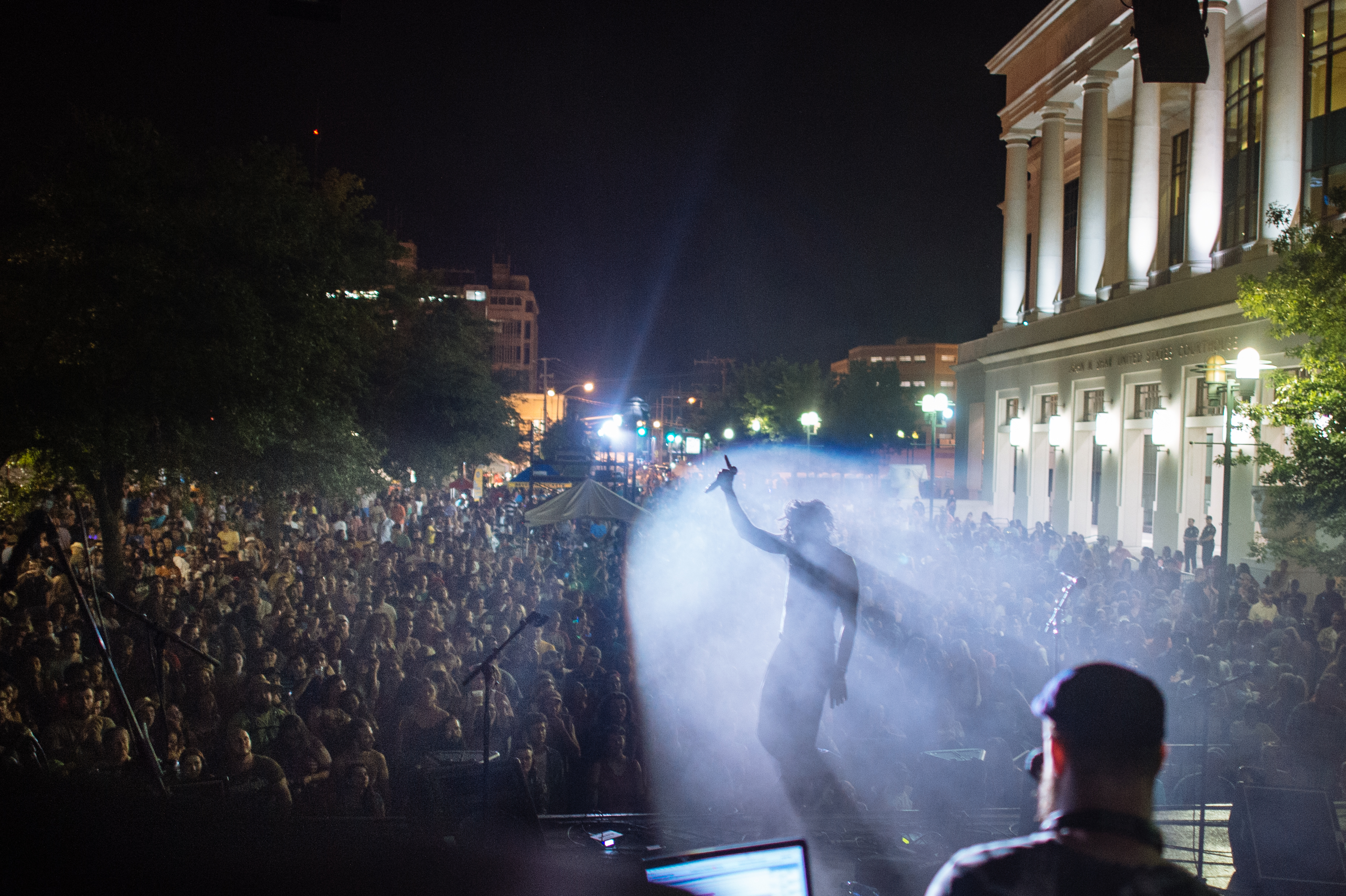
Pierre Kwenders from DR Congo performed at Scène Lafayette in 2016.

The Festival International De Louisiane is an annual music and arts festival held in Lafayette, Louisiana, celebrating the French heritage of the region and its connection to the French-speaking world. The festival was first held in 1987 and has attracted musicians, artists, and craftsmen from around the world. The festival is held outdoors in downtown Lafayette on the last full weekend of April and is free to the public. Estimates for attendance include 400,000 in 2016. The festival was voted the "Best World Music Festival" by About.com readers in their 2012 and 2013 Readers' Choice Awards. 2020 saw a virtual event due to the COVID-19 pandemic.

== See also ==
- Cajun music
- Music of Louisiana
- Zydeco
