= Pascuala Ilabaca =

Chilean singer and songwriter

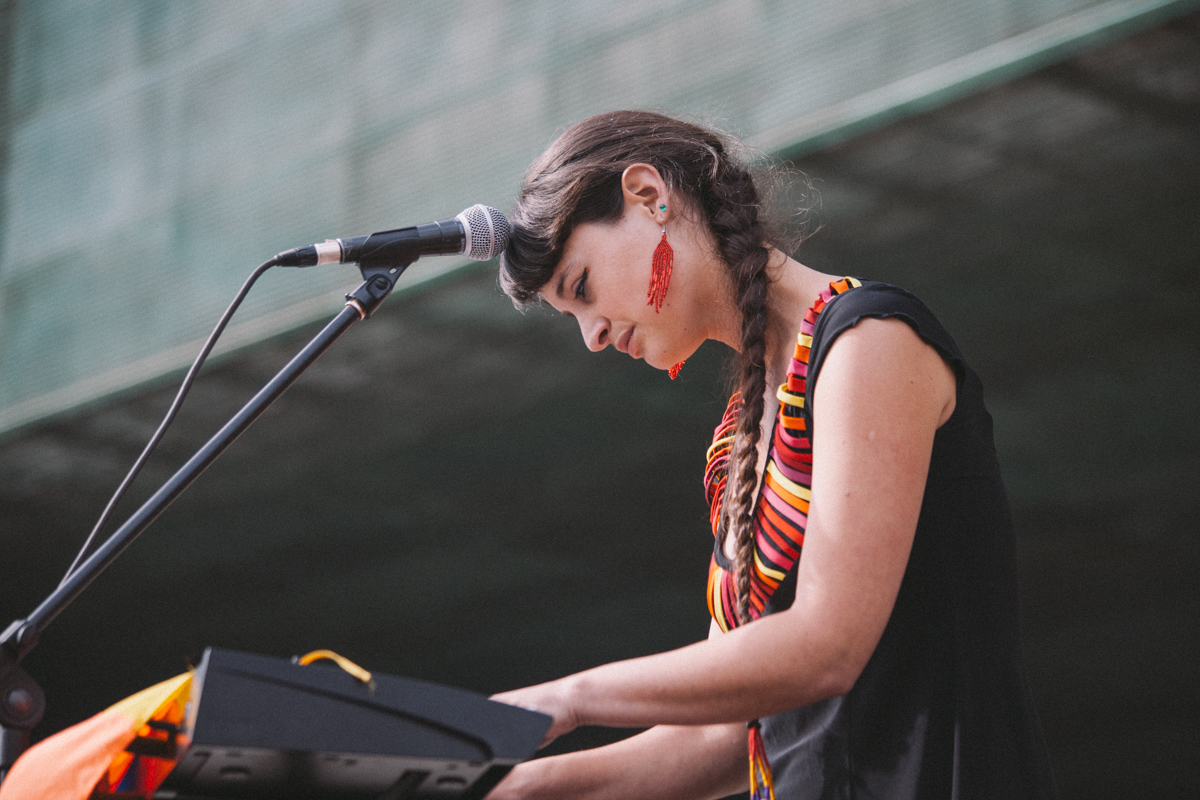
Pascuala Ilabaca (2013)

Pascuala Ilabaca Arandoña (born 1985, Girona, Spain) is a Chilean singer and songwriter, noted for her voice with accompaniment on accordion and piano. She is also a member of Samadi, which compiles ethnic music of India, Africa, South America, Middle East, and Europe. She studied music in India 2008-2009.

== Awards ==
- 2010 - Gold Guitarpin award, Olmue Festival
- 2010 - Audience Award, best Chilean videoclip for “Lamenta la Canela”
- 2015 - At The 14th Annual Independent Music Awards, Pascuala Ilabaca y Fauna won the award in the "Tribute Album" category for "Me Saco El Sombrero".

== Discography ==
- Pascuala Ilabaca y Fauna El mito de la pérgola (2018)
- Pascuala Ilabaca y Fauna Rey Loj (2015)
- Pascuala Ilabaca y Fauna Me saco el sombrero (2014)
- Pascuala Ilabaca y Fauna Busco paraíso (2012)
- Pascuala Ilabaca y Fauna Diablo Rojo, Diablo Verde (2010)
- Samadi Perfume o Veneno (2010)
- Pascuala Ilabaca Pascuala le canta a Violeta (2008)
