= Rajasthan International Folk Festival =

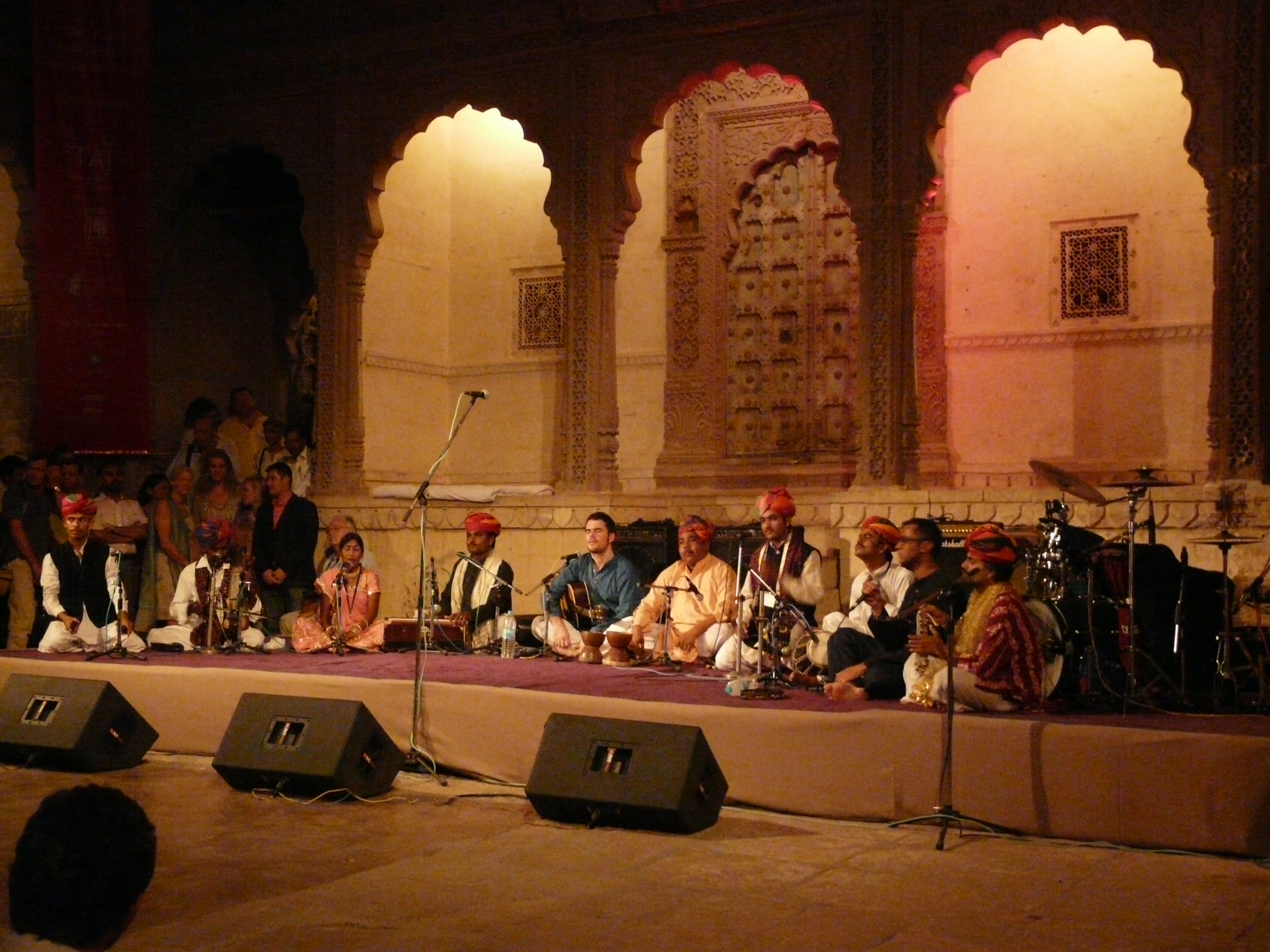
- A group performing at Mehrangarh Fort in 2009
- Genre: Folk, Fusion
- Dates: Sharad Purnima, October
- Locations: Mehrangarh Fort, Jodhpur
- Years active: 25 October 2007—present
- Founders: Mehrangarh Museum Trust, Jaipur Virasat Foundation
- Website: www.jodhpurriff.org

Rajasthan International Folk Festival (or Jodhpur RIFF or Jodhpur folk festival) is an annual music and art festival organized to promote traditional folk music and arts held at Mehrangarh Fort, Jodhpur, Rajasthan.

== History ==
The festival was first organized as a not-for-profit partnership between Mehrangarh Museum Trust and Jaipur Virasat Foundation in October 2007. The festival is timed to match the time of the brightest full moon of the year (which in Northern India is known as Sharad Purnima). The chief patron of the festival is Maharaja Gaj Singh. The festival is organized in and around Mehrangarh Fort.

== Programming ==
The festival is planned to provide an open stage to all folk artists and musicians from India as well as from the globe. Around 250 musicians and artists from Rajasthan and elsewhere attend this festival.

== International attention ==
The festival is supported by UNESCO as a "People's Platform for Creativity and Sustainable Development". In 2012 and 2013, Songlines regarded RIFF as one of the best 25 international festivals.

== 2013 edition ==
The theme of 2013 edition of the festival was the ancient history of the Mehrangarh Fort which was selected as Asia's best fortress by Time. The year's featured performances include Afghani rubab player Daud Khan Sadozai, sessions on the culture of Manganiar of Marwar, the Rajasthani artists with Dilshad Khan, and Manu Chao.

== 2015 edition ==
The ninth edition of Jodhpur RIFF was held from 23 to 27 October. That year, Grammy Award winners Wouter Kellerman and Yossi Fine performed at the festival.
