= Catrin Finch and Cimarron Live YN BYW =

Live album by Cimarrón
- Released: 2007
- Genre: Joropo
- Label: Astar Artes Recordings

Cimarrón chronology
Sí, soy llanero (2004)	Catrin Finch and Cimarron; Live YN BYW (2007)	¡Cimarrón! Joropo music from the Plains of Colombia (2011)

Catrin Finch and Cimarron Live YN BYW is a live album recorded in 2007 by the official harpist of the Prince of Wales, Catrin Finch, and Colombian band Cimarron.

== Recording ==
The album was produced by the Astar Arts Recordings and the Theatr Mwldan of Cardigan, United Kingdom.

The songs of the album were interpreted live by Cimarron and Catrin Finch in Wales.

== Tour ==
Catrin Finch and Colombian band Cimarron performed in different stages across Wales in 2007, such as Theatr Mwldan (Cardigan), Galeri Caernarfon Theater (Caernarfon), Aberystwyth Arts Centre (Aberystwyth), Theatr Brycheiniog (Brecon) and Taliesin Arts Centre (Swansea).

In 2009, Cimarrón returned to Wales and performed in new stages such as Torch Theater (Aberdaugleddau), Theatr Swiwt (Rhosllanerchrugog), Theatr Hafren (Drenewydd), St. David's Hall (Caerdydd), Theatr Felinfach (Felinfach), Park & Dare (Treorchi), The Welfare (Ystradgynlais), Ammanford Miners Theater (Ammanford) and Dartington Hall (Devon).

Catrin Finch and Cimarrón recorded the performance on video at Acapela Studio, Cardiff.

== Track listing ==
1. Cimarroneando
2. Ar ben waun tredegar
3. Sun dance from the Santa Fe suite
4. Merch y melinydd
5. La tonada
6. Maria Laya
7. Zumbaquezumba
8. Tryweryn
9. Llongau caernarfon
10. Tros y garreg
11. Quitapesares
