= Blackfire (American band) =

Native American punk rock band

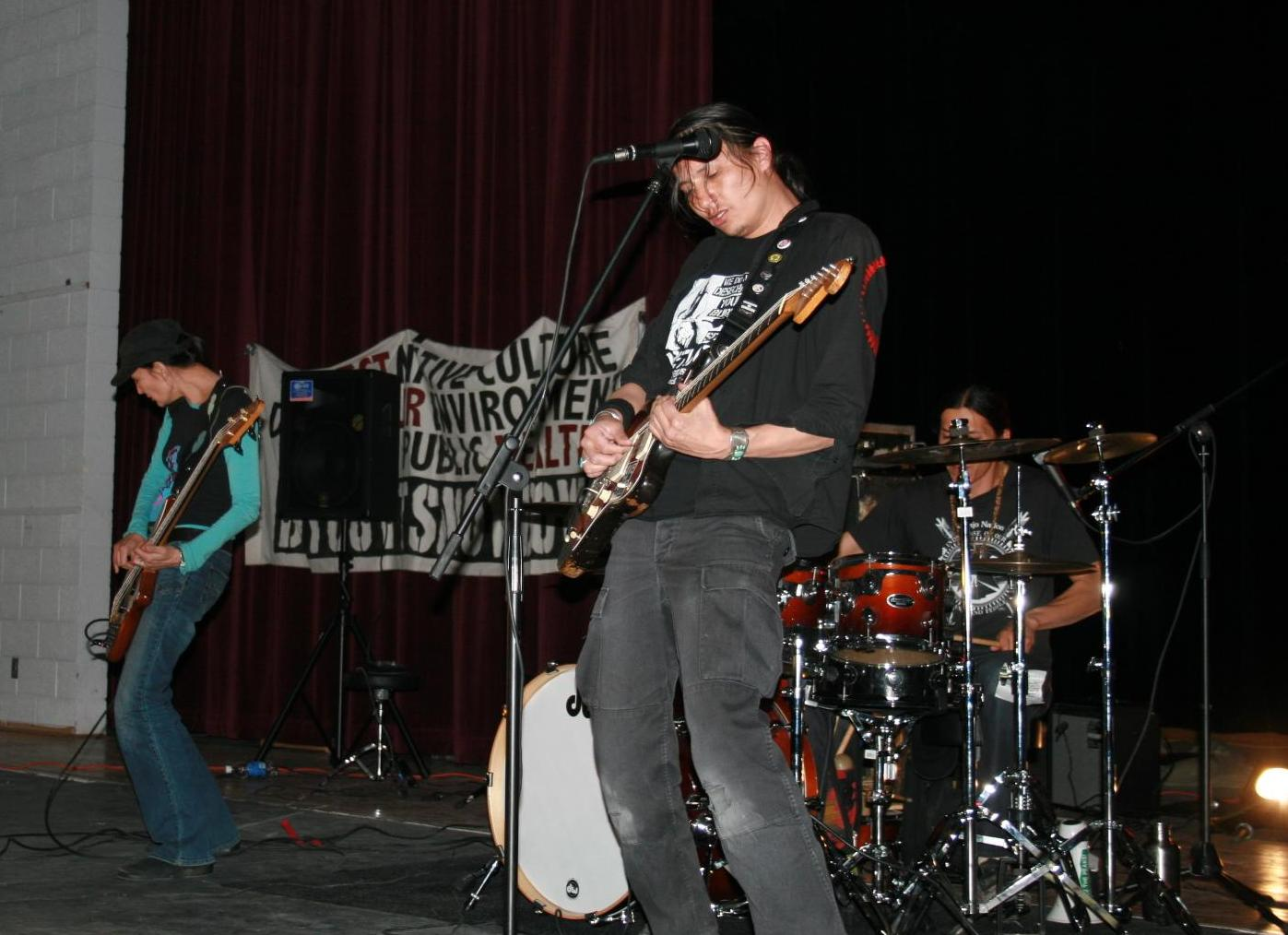
- Blackfire performing live

Background information
- Origin: Flagstaff, Arizona, U.S.
- Genres: Punk rock; alternative rock; anarcho-punk; indigenous metal
- Years active: 1989–2011
- Members: Jeneda Benally; Clayson Benally
- Past members: Klee Benally
- Website: blackfire.net

Blackfire was a Native American punk rock group. Composed of two brothers and their sister, their musical style is influenced by traditional Diné music and alternative rock, with political messages about government oppression and human rights. In 2012, members formed the band Sihasin.

== History ==
=== Beginnings (1989–1993) ===
Blackfire was founded in 1989 in Flagstaff, Arizona by siblings Jeneda, Klee, and Clayson Benally. Their mother was a folk singer-songwriter of Russian-Polish Jewish descent, while their father, Jones Benally, was a traditional Navajo medicine man. The siblings have been playing music since "their instruments were bigger than they were." Jones and his children perform as the Jones Benally Family."

=== Release of EPs (1994–1999) ===
In 1994, C.J. Ramone produced a five-song EP that became their debut album released on their label Tacoho Productions. It also included musical contributions by their father Jones and Robert Tree Cody. In 1999, they received a NAMA nomination for Best Independent Release.

=== One Nation Under and Woody Guthrie Singles (2001–2003) ===
By the end of 2001, they released their first LP One Nation Under. Featuring their father doing traditional vocals, the album is described as "15 passionately burning songs of struggles, resistance, and hope." The song "No Control" was used in "New Mexico, Old Monster," the 13th episode of the 2nd season of What's New, Scooby-Doo?. It is also the last project that Joey Ramone, who dubbed Blackfire's music as "fireball punk-rock," contributed to before he died due to lymphoma. On the album, he provided additional voicing for the songs "What Do You See" and "Lying to Myself." That same year, they won the NAMA Best Pop/Rock Album award. Fleming was also nominated for Best Producer. One Nation Under is available through Canyon Records.

In 2003, they journeyed to Essakne, Mali in northern Africa. Their performance was included in the compilation album Festival in the Desert. By next year, they released a two-track EP titled Woody Guthrie Singles. The songs on the EP are called "Mean Things Happenin' in this World," a protest song dealing with issues like wars waged for fortune and encroachment of rights by the federal government, and "~~Indian~~ Corn Song," a song about "political and big business corruption, the poor economy, and ends with a plea to feed the homeless and orphans."

=== Death of Klee Benally ===
Vocalist and guitarist Klee Benally died on December 30, 2023, at the age of 48.

== Band members ==
- Clayson Benally – percussion, vocals (1989–2011)
- Jeneda Benally – bass guitar, vocals (1989–2011)
- Klee Benally – vocals, guitar (1989–2011; died 2023)

== Discography ==
- Blackfire (Five-song E.P., 1994)
- Blackfire (Three-song E.P., 1998)
- One Nation Under (2001)
- Woody Guthrie Singles (2003).
- Beyond Warped: Live Music Series (CD/DVD, 2005)
- [Silence] Is A Weapon (2007)
- Anthology Of Resistance (2009)

== Other sources ==
- Vincent Schilling (November 1, 2011). Native Defenders of The Environment. Native Voices Books. pp. 76–. ISBN 978-1-57067-995-7.
- Brian Wright-McLeod (2005). The Encyclopedia of Native Music: More Than a Century of Recordings from Wax Cylinder to the Internet. University of Arizona Press. pp. 61–. ISBN 978-0-8165-2448-8.
- Michelle H. Raheja (January 1, 2011). Reservation Reelism: Redfacing, Visual Sovereignty, and Representations of Native Americans in Film. U of Nebraska Press. ISBN 978-0-8032-6827-2.
- David King Dunaway Professor of English University of New Mexico; Molly Beer freelance writer University of New Mexico (April 14, 2010). Singing Out: An Oral History of America's Folk Music Revivals: An Oral History of America's Folk Music Revivals. Oxford University Press, USA. pp. 168–. ISBN 978-0-19-970294-7.
- Bruce E. Johansen PhD (September 22, 2015). American Indian Culture: From Counting Coup to Wampum [2 volumes]: From Counting Coup to Wampum. ABC-CLIO. pp. 564–. ISBN 978-1-4408-2874-4.
- Russell M. Lawson (April 2, 2013). Encyclopedia of American Indian Issues Today. ABC-CLIO. pp. 688–. ISBN 978-0-313-38145-4.
- Elaine Keillor; Tim Archambault; John M. H. Kelly (March 27, 2013). Encyclopedia of Native American Music of North America. ABC-CLIO. pp. 181–. ISBN 978-0-313-05506-5.
- Eunice Rojas; Lindsay Michie (October 8, 2013). Sounds of Resistance: The Role of Music in Multicultural Activism. ABC-CLIO. pp. 42–. ISBN 978-0-313-39806-3.
- American Indian Culture and Research Journal. American Indian Culture and Research Center, University of California. 2008.
- Living Blues. Vol. 171–175. Center for the Study of Southern Culture, The University of Mississippi. 2004. pp. 42–.
