= Bersuit Vergarabat =

Argentine rock band

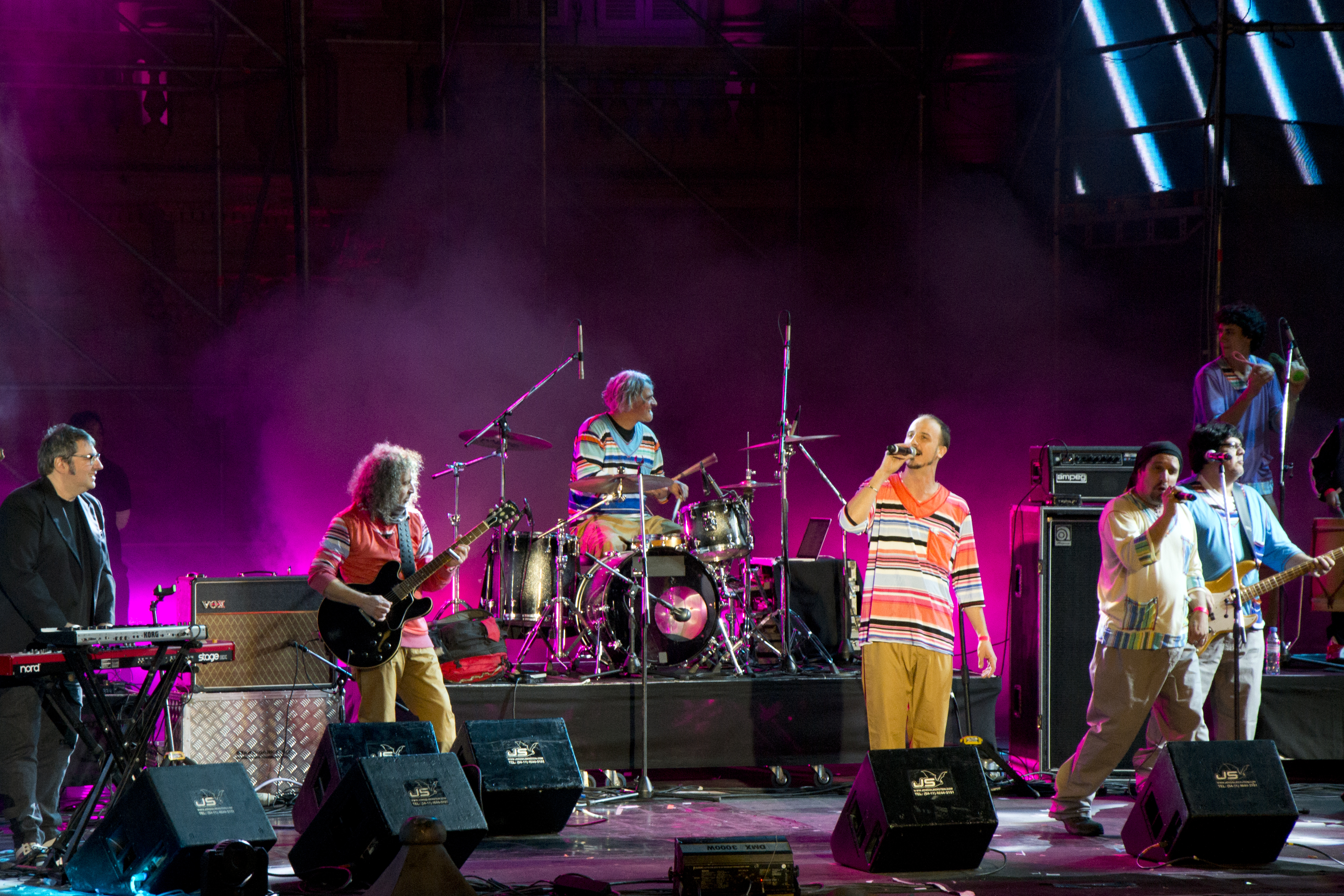
- Bersuit Vergarabat in 2014

Background information
- Origin: Buenos Aires, Argentina
- Genres: Argentine Rock, Rock en Español, Cumbia, Chacarera, Candombe, Jazz rock, Murga, Tango
- Years active: 1987–present
- Labels: Universal Music, Surco
- Members: Juan Subirá (keyboards and voice); Carlos Enrique Martín (drums); Pepe Céspedes (bass and voice); Daniel Suárez (voice); Alberto Verenzuela] (guitar and voice); Germán Sbarbati (voice and charango)
- Past members: Gustavo Cordera (voice); Oscar Righi (guitar and voice); Rubén Sadrinas (voice); Charly Bianco (guitar); Marcela Chediak (percussion); Miguel Jara (bass); Raúl Pagano (keyboards)
- Website: www.bersuit.com

Bersuit Vergarabat (Commonly referred to as La Bersuit) is an Argentine rock band that formed formally in 1987.

== History ==
The previous name of the band (from 1987 to May 1989) was Henry y la Palangana. By the end of 1989, the band had changed name several times, adopting nonsensical names like "Ernios of arcabio", "Aparrata Vergi", "Seria Soneub" (Buenos Aires spelled backwards); but eventually settled on "Bersuit Vergarabat Van de ir" then keeping only "Bersuit Vergarabat" its most iconic name.

After two albums of largely underground transgressor rock music, the band began to experiment with Latin American rhythms such as cumbia, chacarera, candombe and cuartetazo. The lyrics, though, remained acerbic, sardonic, and critical-leaning with regard to political and social problems.

The current formation is Alberto Verenzuela (vocals, guitar, harmonica), Daniel Suárez (vocals), Germán Sbarbati (vocals, charango), Juan Subirá (keyboards, accordion, vocals), Pepe Céspedes (bass, vocals, guitar) and Carlos Enrique Martín (drums, percussion); previous members include: Gustavo Cordera (vocals), Charly Bianco (guitar, vocals), Marcela Chediak (percussion), Rubén Sadrinas (vocals) and Oscar Righi (guitar).

In honor of Buenos Aires's José Tiburcio Borda Psychiatric Hospital, the band often performs in clinical pajamas. Although there is no truth to the urban legend of Cordera spending some time in that institution, the band has demonstrated an affinity for everything related to madness and marginalization.

In addition to finding success in the Buenos Aires' underground movement, and then nationwide, Bersuit Vergarabat has attracted fans from many countries in Latin America as well as Spain and United States.

The band's success beyond Latin America hinges largely on their ability to constantly reinvent themselves, as with their late 1990s venture into reggae music, popular in the United States at the time.

One of the band's signature songs, «El tiempo no para» from their album Y Punto, is a cover of "O Tempo não Pára" by the Brazilian musician Cazuza. In his honor, Gustavo Cordera sings one of the song's verses in the live version in Portuguese.

After having success in several countries, the band broke up in 2009, due to Subirá's embarkation on a solo career. They returned to the stage three years later without their original singer Gustavo Cordera. Since then, Bersuit released 3 studio albums, La Revuelta (2012), El Baile Interior (2014), La Nube Rosa (2016). This new material consolidated Condor Sbarbati and Daniel Suarez as main singers.

== Members ==
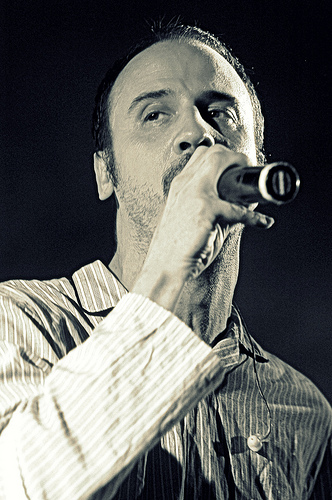
Daniel Suarez
(vocals)

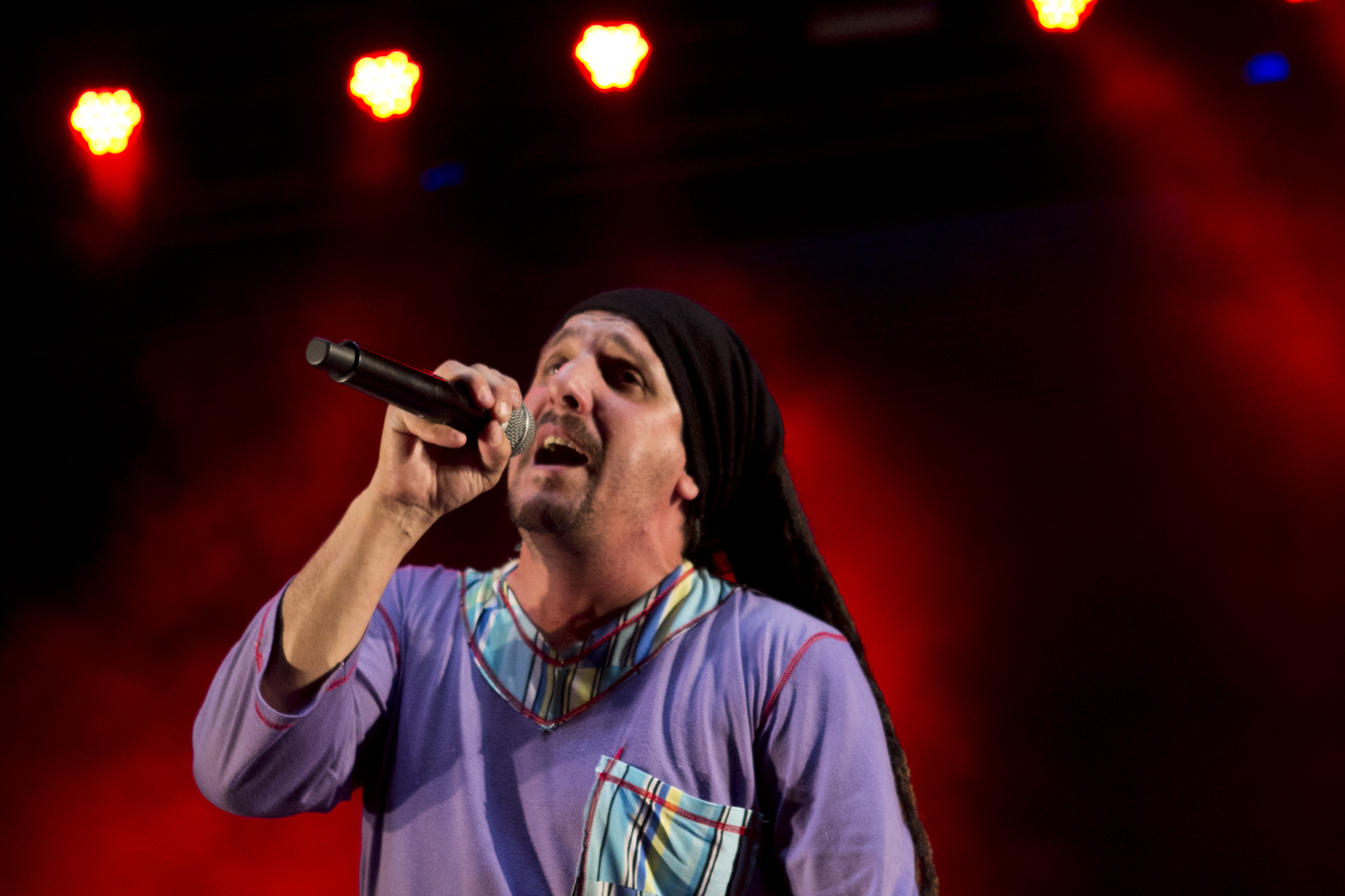
Germán Sbarbati
(vocals)

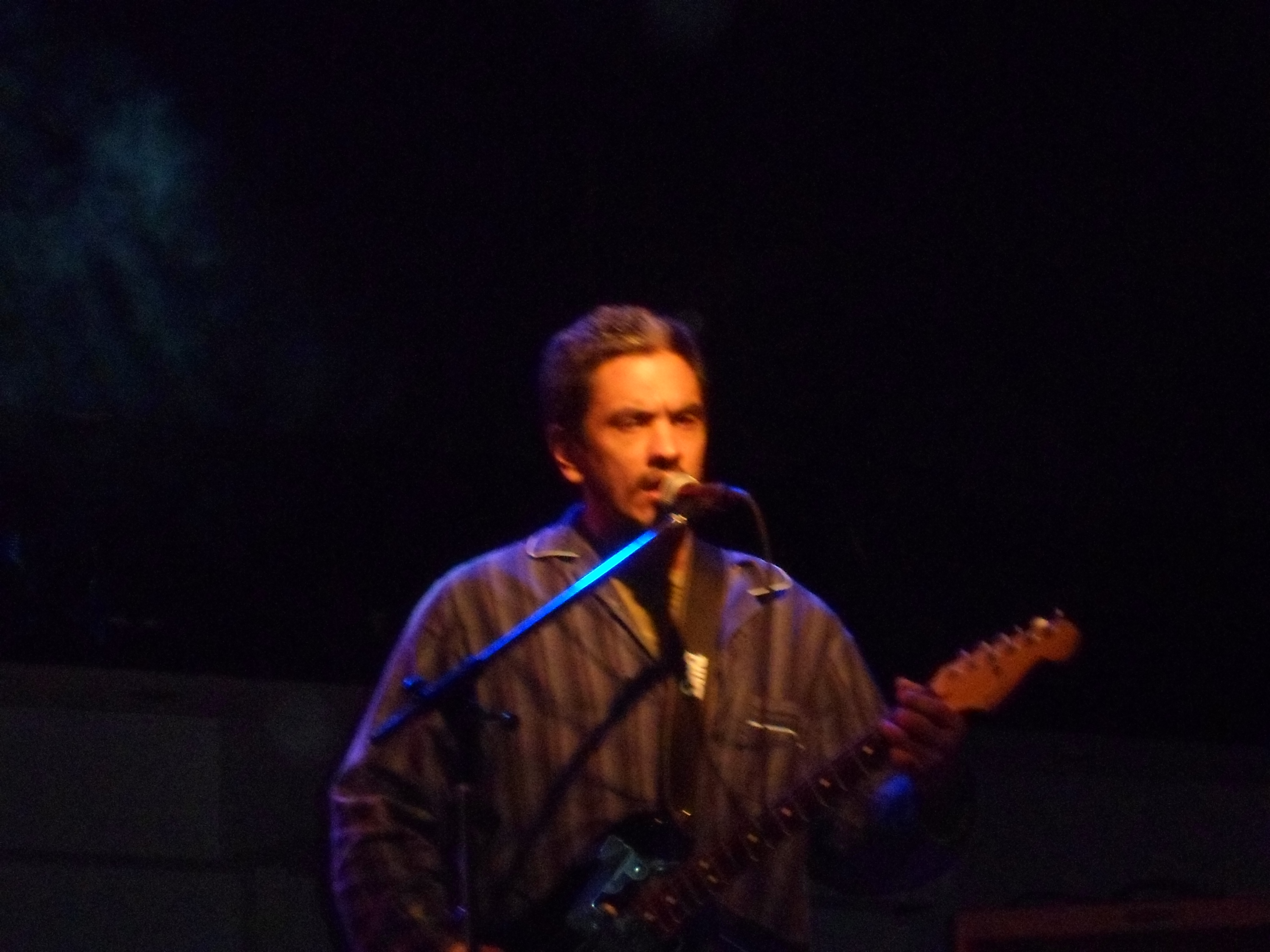
Alberto Verenzuela
(guitar and vocals)

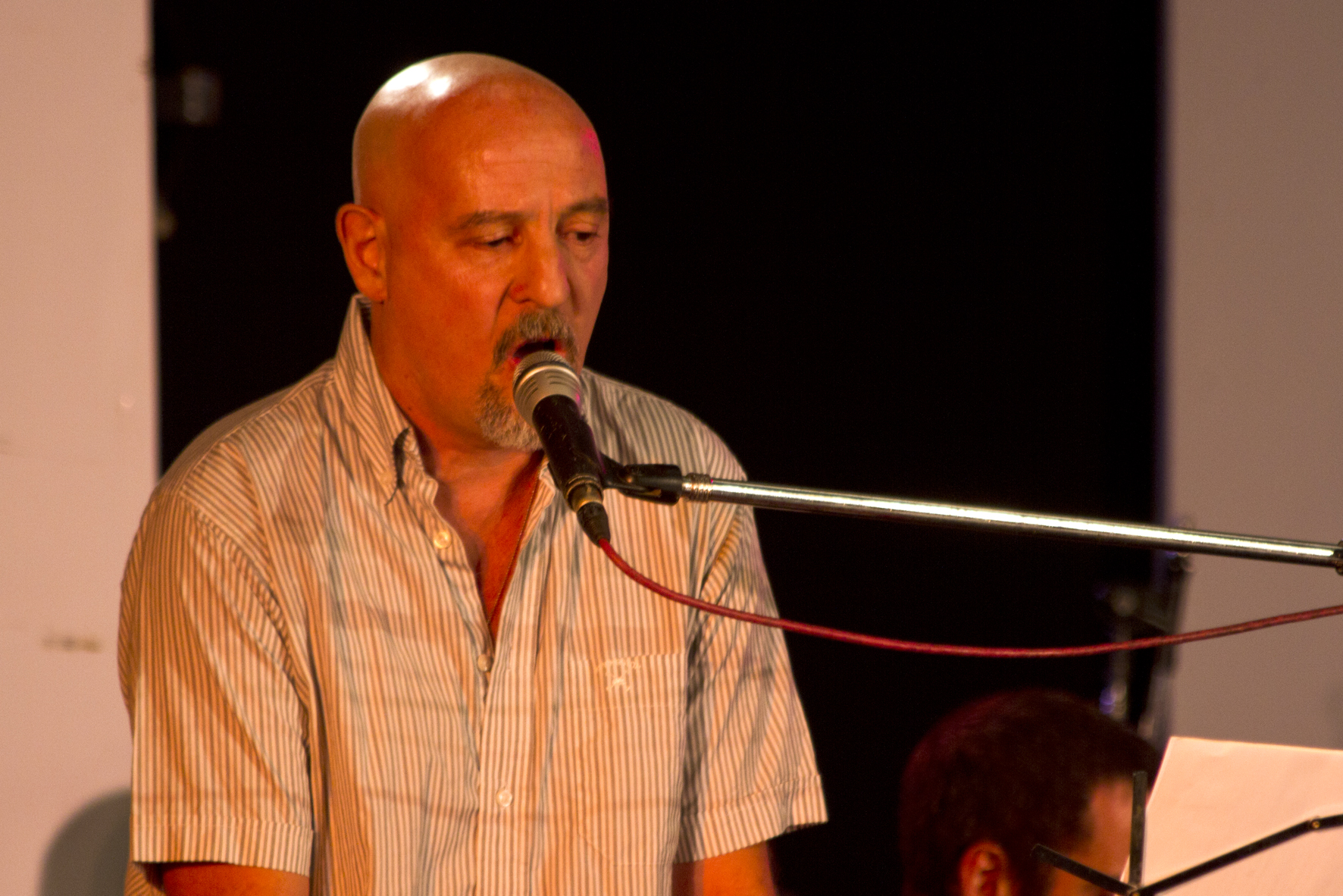
Juan Subirá
(keyboards, accordion and vocals)

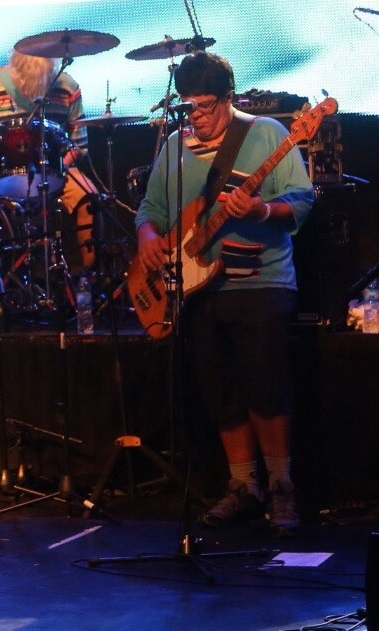
Pepe Céspedes
(bass and voice)

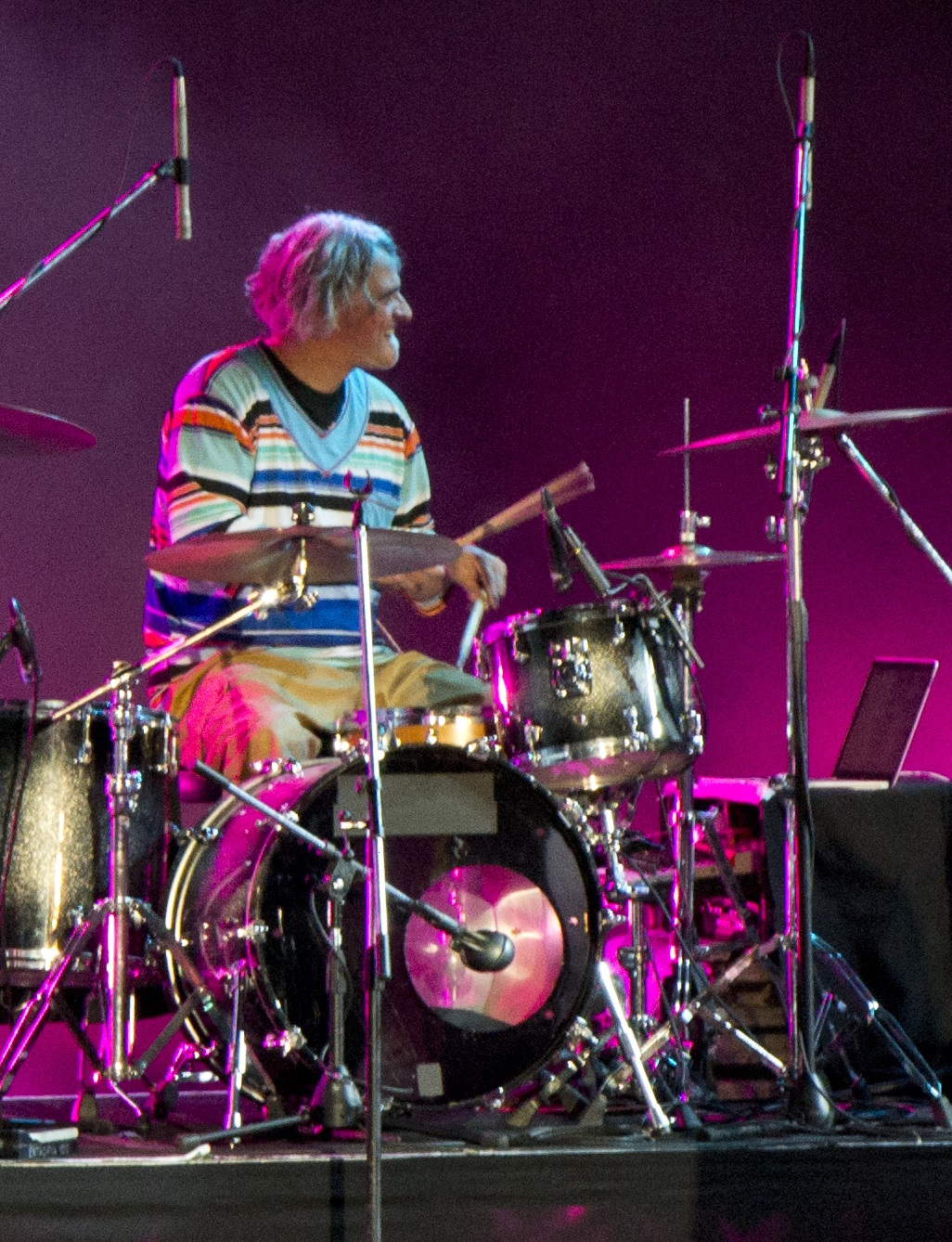
Carlos Enrique Martín
(Drums and percussion)

== Discography ==
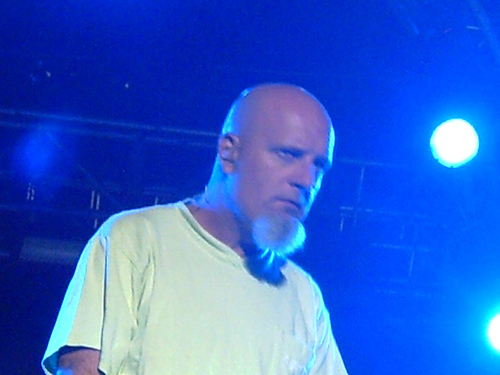
Gustavo Cordera in 2006.

=== Studio albums ===
- 1992 - Y Punto (And That's It)
- 1993 - Asquerosa Alegría (Disgusting Joy)
- 1996 - Don Leopardo (Mr. Leopard)
- 1998 - Libertinaje (Debauchery)
- 2000 - Hijos del Culo (Sons of the Ass)
- 2004 - La Argentinidad al Palo - Se Es, Lo Que Se Es (Double) (Argentineness to the Max - It Is, What It Is)
- 2005 - Testosterona (Testosterone)
- 2006 - Bersuit
- 2007 - ?
- 2012 - La Revuelta (The Revolt)
- 2014 - El Baile Interior (The Inner Dance)
- 2016 - La Nube Rosa (The Pink Cloud)
- 2024 - Cocoliche Life

=== Live albums ===
- 2002 - De la Cabeza

=== Compilations ===
- 2006 Bersuit - (CD/DVD)
- 2006 Lados BV - (VB-Sides)

== Awards ==
Year	Award	Category	Result
2002	MTV VMA 1999	MTV Latin America (North)	Nominated
2002	MTV VMALA 2002	Best Artist — Southeast	Nominated
2003	MTV VMALA 2003	Best Artist Argentina	Won
2003	Premios Gardel 2003	Mejor Album Grupo de Rock De la cabeza	Nominated
2004	MTV VMALA 2004	Best Rock Artist - Best Artist Argentina	Nominated
2005	MTV VMALA 2005	Best Artist Southeast	Nominated
2005	Premios Gardel 2005	Mejor Album Grupo Rock - Album del Año	Won
2005	Premios Gardel 2005	Canción del Año - Realización del Año - Mejor DVD - Mejor Video Clip - Mejor Diseño de Portada	Nominated
2006	Premios MTV 2006	Best Rock Artist	Nominated
2006	Premios Gardel 2006	Mejor Diseño de Portada, Mejor Video Clip, Interpretación, Producción, Canción y Album del Año	Nominated
2007	Premios MTV 2007	Best Rock Artist	Nominated
2007	Premios Gardel 2007	Mejor DVD	Nominated
