= Festival Músicas do Mundo =

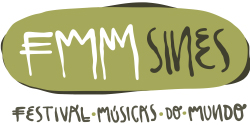
- Genre: World music
- Dates: July
- Frequency: annual
- Locations: Sines, Portugal
- Years active: 26–27 years
- Inaugurated: 1999
- Founders: Carlos Seixas, Manuel Coelho
- Organiser: Sines Municipal Council
- Website: fmmsines.pt

Festival Músicas do Mundo (FMM, English: World Music Festival), also known as FMM Sines, was founded in 1999 and is a yearly music festival in Portugal that takes place every July in Sines, a municipality in the Alentejo region of Portugal. It is organised by the city council, and is regarded as the biggest "world music" event organized in Portugal, dedicated mainly to folk and traditional music, while also encompassing many other genres. FMM reached an attendance record of over 100,000 in 2023.

== Genres ==
The festival is focused on world music, with genres including jazz, folk, blues, tango, reggae, classical music, fusion, fado, morna, klezmer, avant-garde, afrobeat, Tuvan throat singing, electronic dance music, and rock music.

== Stages ==
The festival takes place in Sines’ historical center (the castle, Sines' Arts Center, and the beach) and the village of Porto Covo, 13 km south of Sines. All the venues are outdoors, except for the Arts Center. The castle holds a maximum of 6,500 people, Porto Covo 8,000, and the beach stage 15,000;

== History ==
Since 1999, the total audience of FMM amounts to 240,000 people. Artists featured throughout the years include Shemekia Copeland, Omar Sosa, Taraf de Haïdouks, Black Uhuru feat. Sly & Robbie, Hedningarna, Cui Jian, Céu, Tinariwen, Sa Dingding, Kronos Quartet, The Skatalites, Gaiteiros de Lisboa, Lee "Scratch" Perry, Tom Zé, Femi Kuti, Hermeto Pascoal, Marc Ribot, KTU, Master Musicians of Jajouka, Konono Nº1, Staff Benda Bilili, Señor Coconut, Trilok Gurtu, Toumani Diabaté, Rabih Abou-Khalil, Mahmoud Ahmed, Salif Keita, Gogol Bordello, Seun Kuti, Nortec Collective and Alamaailman Vasarat.

=== Reception and reviews ===
FMM has received abundant praise from the press and the artists alike. In 2000, Jacques Dénis, from French daily liberation wrote: "In Sines, it's mainly world music in the move". In 2001, L’Humanité's Patrick Koan said: "An impeccable programme for the quality of its concerts and its balance", In 2005, FMM was considered "one of the best festivals in Europe" on Finnish accordion player Kimmo Pohjonen's website. The Bad Plus American jazz trio wrote in their blog: "The festival seems to be one of the most serious parties around" (2006), The same year Iraqi singer Farida said that FMM was "one of the five best festivals" she had ever taken part. In 2007, Malian singer Oumou Sangaré called it "the festival of joy".
