= Mil horas =

1983 single by Los Abuelos de la Nada

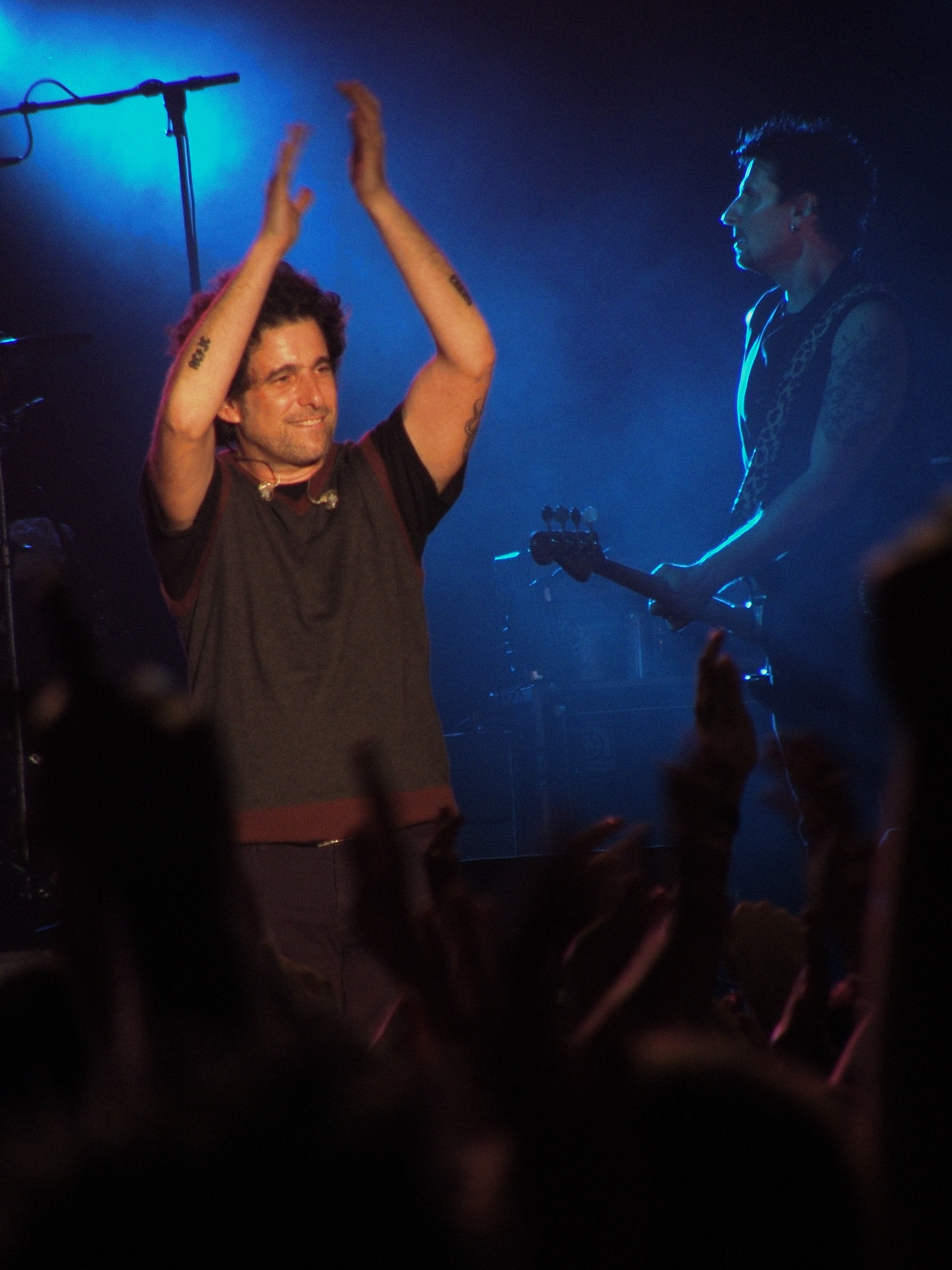
Andrés Calamaro, author and composer of the song.

"Mil horas" (English: One thousand hours) is a song by Argentine band Los Abuelos de la Nada, included in the second album Vasos y besos, published in 1983. Composed by keyboardist and singer Andrés Calamaro, the song became one of the band's biggest successes. It holds 5th place on the top 100 best songs of the 80s in Spanish list according to VH1 Latin America, and the 14th place on the top 100 hits of Argentine rock by Rolling Stone.

In 2024, the song was re-imagined by band member Cachorro López for his album Éxtasis Total – Las Canciones de los Abuelos de la Nada. It featured vocals by Argentine singer Lali, and it peaked at number 70 on the Billboard Argentina Hot 100.

== History ==
=== Origin and meaning of the song ===
One of the interpretations is about the use of drugs, and not to singing to your beloved one, or a composition on the avatars of the life, also is interpreted like a self-evident against the War of the Falklands.

With the peak of the Latin Top list rock in Spanish, the success of the band keeps youth and force by dint of intensive repetition in the local radios that have stood up the song 25 years after having been edited.

Perhaps the public of Redonditos loves me for the sentence "bite the hook and go back to start afresh" (of the song Costumbres argentinas), that is one of the one thousand that I wrote to speak of drugs without it being noticed. Or by Mil horas, that speaks of a red star that was an acid. Or "A red star on Argentina" was an image on the blood? I do not know it. But yes, I know that I was born on 22 August, the same day of the massacre of Trelew. To have a rocket in the trousers is the porro. I spoke of all this when nobody spoke of this, confessed Calamaro in an interview to the daily Page/12. A red star on Argentina» wrote Andrés in years of political transition, when the albiceleste remained deleted of Spain 1982, while he looked for words that rhymed with 'ina'.

On the way, to «One thousand hours» have gone out him several homages at the front, between them in voice and music of the Enanitos Verdes, The Taken out and The Tipitos. The understood some time thought that the subject had arrived to his last border with the version of the Argentine Union of the Hip Hop, but a recent cover of Magic Juan seems to show that «One thousand hours» continues re-discovering in new registers.

== Curiosities ==
The song has two different versions, the first belongs to the studio album in where a part says a red star that imagines all to him/herself" ((in Spanish) "...una estrella roja que todo se lo imagina"); whereas in some recitals, like the 1983 one at the Buenos Aires Luna Park, Calamaro sings a red star flying over Argentina ((in Spanish) "...una estrella roja volando sobre Argentina").

== Musicians ==
- Andrés Calamaro: Keyboards and lead vocals
- Miguel Abuelo: Percussion and backing vocals
- Gustavo Bazterrica: Guitars and backing vocals
- Cachorro López: Bass and backing vocals
- Daniel Melingo: Saxophone, clarinet and backing vocals
- Polo Corbella: Drums
