= Vasos y besos =

Studio album by Los Abuelos de la Nada
- Released: December 9, 1983
- Genre: New wave; pop rock; reggae; rock and roll; disco; funk
- Length: 37:20
- Producer: Los Abuelos de la Nada

Los Abuelos de la Nada chronology
Los Abuelos de la Nada (1982)	Vasos y besos (1983)	Himno de mi corazón (1984)

Vasos y besos (Glasses and kisses) is the second studio album by Argentine rock group Los Abuelos de la Nada (The Grandfathers Out of Nowhere, or The Grandfathers of Nothingness). It was released in 1983. Among the songs that stand out are the hits "No se desesperen" (Don't Despair) and "Mil horas" (A Thousand Hours); the latter is considered by some to be emblematic of Argentine rock.

In 2007, the Argentine edition of Rolling Stone ranked it 29th on its list of "The 100 Greatest Albums of National Rock".

== Track listing ==
1. "No se desesperen" [Don't Lose Hope] (Gustavo Bazterrica) (4:57)
2. "Así es el calor" [That's Heat] (Andrés Calamaro/Gringui Herrera) (2:38)
3. "Yo soy tu bandera" [I'm Your Flag] (Miguel Abuelo/Cachorro López) (2:49)
4. "Sintonía americana" [American Tune] (M.Abuelo/C.López) (3:09)
5. "Espía de Dios" [God's Spy] (M.Abuelo/G.Bazterica) (2:20)
6. "Cucarachón de tribunal" [Court Cockroach] (G.Bazterica) (3:29)
7. "Vamos al ruedo" [Let's Get Going] (C.López/A.Calamaro) (3:32)
8. "Mil horas" [A Thousand Hours] (Andrés Calamaro) (2:50)
9. "Hermana Teresa" [Sister Teresa] (M.Abuelo/C.López) (3:04)
10. "Chalamán" (Daniel Melingo) (4:05)
11. "Mundos-in-mundos" [Worlds-in-Worlds] (M.Abuelo) (4:32)

== Musicians ==
- Miguel Abuelo: lead vocals, percussion
- Andrés Calamaro: keyboards, vocals
- Cachorro López: bass, backup vocals
- Gustavo Bazterrica: guitar, vocals
- Daniel Melingo: saxophone, clarinet, vocals
- Polo Corbella: drums
