= Time Is on My Side =

1963 single by Kai Winding

Single by Kai Winding
- A-side: "Baby Don't Come On with Me"
- Released: October 3, 1963
- Genre: Rhythm and blues
- Length: 3:05
- Label: Verve
- Songwriter: Norman Meade a.k.a. Jerry Ragovoy
- Producer: Creed Taylor

"Time Is on My Side" is a song written by Jerry Ragovoy (using the pseudonym "Norman Meade"). First recorded by jazz trombonist Kai Winding and his orchestra in 1963, it was covered (with additional lyrics by Jimmy Norman) by both soul singer Irma Thomas and later the Rolling Stones in 1964.

== Kai Winding ==
The song was first recorded by Kai Winding, a Danish-American jazz trombonist who was looking to take his career in a more mainstream direction. Session arranger Garry Sherman contacted friend and colleague Jerry Ragovoy, who wrote the title, melody and chorus. The session singers Dee Dee Warwick, Dionne Warwick and Cissy Houston sang "time is on my side – you'll come running back" in a gospel style over Winding's trombone melody. Produced by Creed Taylor and engineered by Phil Ramone, the recording was released on the Verve Records label in October 1963. It received some radio coverage but did not chart.

== Irma Thomas rendition ==
"Time Is on My Side"

Single by Irma Thomas
- A-side: "Anyone Who Knows What Love Is (Will Understand)"
- Released: May 14, 1964
- Recorded: April 16, 1964
- Genre: Rhythm and blues
- Length: 2:50
- Label: Imperial
- Songwriters: Norman Meade a.k.a. Jerry Ragovoy; Jimmy Norman
- Producer: Eddie Ray

On April 16, 1964, Irma Thomas recorded an R&B cover of the song as the B-side for the single "Anyone Who Knows What Love Is (Will Understand)", released on Imperial Records. H. B. Barnum, the session director, suggested the song, and session singer Jimmy Norman wrote the lyrics during the recording. Thomas monologues during the song that her ex-lover, not she, will suffer for his bad behavior.

Produced by Eddie Ray, Thomas' version of "Time Is on My Side" provided the inspiration for the title of her 1996 greatest-hits release Time Is on My Side.

== Rolling Stones version ==
"Time Is on My Side"

Single by the Rolling Stones

from the album The Rolling Stones No. 2 and 12 × 5
- B-side: "Congratulations"
- Released: September 25, 1964 (US single version)
- Recorded: June 24–26, 1964 (US single version)
- Studio: Regent Sound, London
- Genre: Blues rock; rhythm and blues
- Length: 2:50
- Label: London
- Songwriters: Norman Meade a.k.a. Jerry Ragovoy; Jimmy Norman
- Producer: Andrew Loog Oldham

The Rolling Stones American singles chronology
"It's All Over Now" (1964)	"Time Is on My Side" (1964)	"Heart of Stone" (1964)
"Going to a Go-Go" (1982)	"Time Is on My Side" (1982)	"Undercover of the Night" (1983)

Thomas' song came to the Rolling Stones' attention, as they often bought US-imported music from Soho shops. According to Garth Cartwright of the Financial Times, Thomas' "big chorus, blues flavour and callous dismissal of a lover" suited the band. They first recorded the song in June 1964, within days of hearing it, at London's Regent Sound studios. They used a briefer organ-only intro and guitars in place of horns to create a rock anthem song, with vocalist Mick Jagger imitating Thomas' ad-libs. This looser arrangement was released as a single in the US on September 25, 1964, and was included the following month on their US album 12 × 5.

The single peaked at No. 6 on the US Billboard Pop Singles Chart to become the Rolling Stones' first top ten hit there Their previous single, "It's All Over Now", had peaked at No. 26. Cash Box described the song at the time as a "throbbing rhythm affair" with "an effective mid-deck recitation".

The second arrangement (more tightly arranged and featuring guitar in the intro), recorded in Chicago's Chess studio on November 8, 1964, was released in the UK on January 15, 1965, on The Rolling Stones No. 2. This later rendition is the one that receives the most airplay and appears on most "best of" compilations. Both versions incorporate elements of Irma Thomas' recording, including spoken-word interjections in the chorus, a monologue in the middle of the song, and distinctive lead guitar.

A live version of the song from the band's 1982 live album, Still Life, reached No. 62 in the UK Singles Chart. Reviewing the 1982 live release for Record Mirror, Simon Hills gave the single a highly scathing review, placing it under the ironic heading "Derby and Joan Corner." Hills questioned the commercial purpose of the release, calling it "incomprehensible" that anyone would choose to purchase "this version by a group of old men on tour for the cash" when the original studio recording was still readily available.

The song was part of the British Invasion, in which English covers of black American songs received more U.S. radio attention than the original had (although Thomas' version had been released as a B-side; most DJs played the A-sides). Thomas refused to sing her version after the Rolling Stones' recording for multiple decades, telling interviewers that the band had not acknowledged her despite giving support act slots to other singers like Tina Turner. In 1992, she began performing the song again following a TV show appearance in which the host Bonnie Raitt introduced her as the original singer. On May 2, 2024, during the Rolling Stones' performance at the New Orleans Jazz & Heritage Festival, Jagger and Thomas performed the song as a duet, which was the first time the Rolling Stones had performed the song live since 1998.

The Rolling Stones version of "Time Is on My Side" plays a key plot element in the 1998 movie Fallen, starring Denzel Washington.

=== Personnel ===
Credits adapted from Margotin and Guesdon

- Mick Jagger – lead vocals and tambourine
- Keith Richards – lead guitar, rhythm guitar and backing vocals
- Brian Jones – rhythm guitar
- Bill Wyman – bass and backing vocals
- Charlie Watts – drums
- Ian Stewart – Vox Continental organ

=== Charts ===
Chart (1964–1965)	Peak position
Belgium (Ultratop 50 Flanders)	5
Canada Top Singles (RPM)	3
Finland (Suomen Virallinen Lista)	20
France	4
Germany (GfK)	28
Netherlands (Single Top 100)	6
New Zealand (Lever Hit Parade)	2
Sweden (Kvällstoppen)	17
Switzerland	3
US Billboard Hot 100	6
US (Cash Box Top 100)	6

== Recordings by other artists ==
"Time Is on My Side" has since been covered by artists such as Indexi, Michael Bolton, Cat Power, Hattie Littles, Blondie, Wilson Pickett, Brian Poole and the Tremeloes, the O'Jays, the Pretty Things, Lorraine Ellison, Paul Revere and the Raiders, Kim Wilson, Tracy Nelson, Patti Smith, Andrés Calamaro (for his El Salmón, a CD set with 103 songs), and the Moody Blues (in 1965 and on the 1985 re-release of The Magnificent Moodies).

Pop singer and pianist Vanessa Carlton recorded a version for a Time Warner digital video recorders commercial, which also served as promotion for her second album, Harmonium (2004), and received heavy rotation on US television during early 2005. The newspaper Metroland reviewed her take on the song negatively, and wrote, "we tend to think time is most definitely not on her side — how else to explain the near-universal apathy to the release of her second album, Harmonium?" Harmonium was not re-issued to include the song.

In 2004, Jimmy Norman, who wrote the lyrics to "Time is on My Side" but whose name was eventually removed from credits, recorded it for the first time as the last track on his album Little Pieces.

In 2007, English soul singer Beverley Knight recorded it, featuring Ronnie Wood, for her fifth studio album, Music City Soul.

In 2012, American professional wrestler Bray Wyatt often menacingly sang the chorus of the song during his promos.

"Time Is on My Side" appears on the 2022 release of Live at the Fillmore 1997 by Tom Petty and the Heartbreakers.
