= Raíces =

Raíces or Raices may refer to:

- Raíces, Zinacantepec, State of Mexico, second highest-altitude village in Mexico
- Raíces (film) (Spanish: Raíces), a 1955 Mexican drama film
- The Refugee and Immigrant Center for Education and Legal Services (RAICES)

== Music ==
- Raíces (band), Argentine rock band of the 1980s
- Raíces (Colomer), a composition for symphony wind orchestra by Valencian composer Juan J. Colomer
- Raíces (Gloria Estefan album), 2025
- Raíces (Julio Iglesias album), 1989
- Raíces (Los Tigres del Norte album), 2008
