= Beto Satragni =

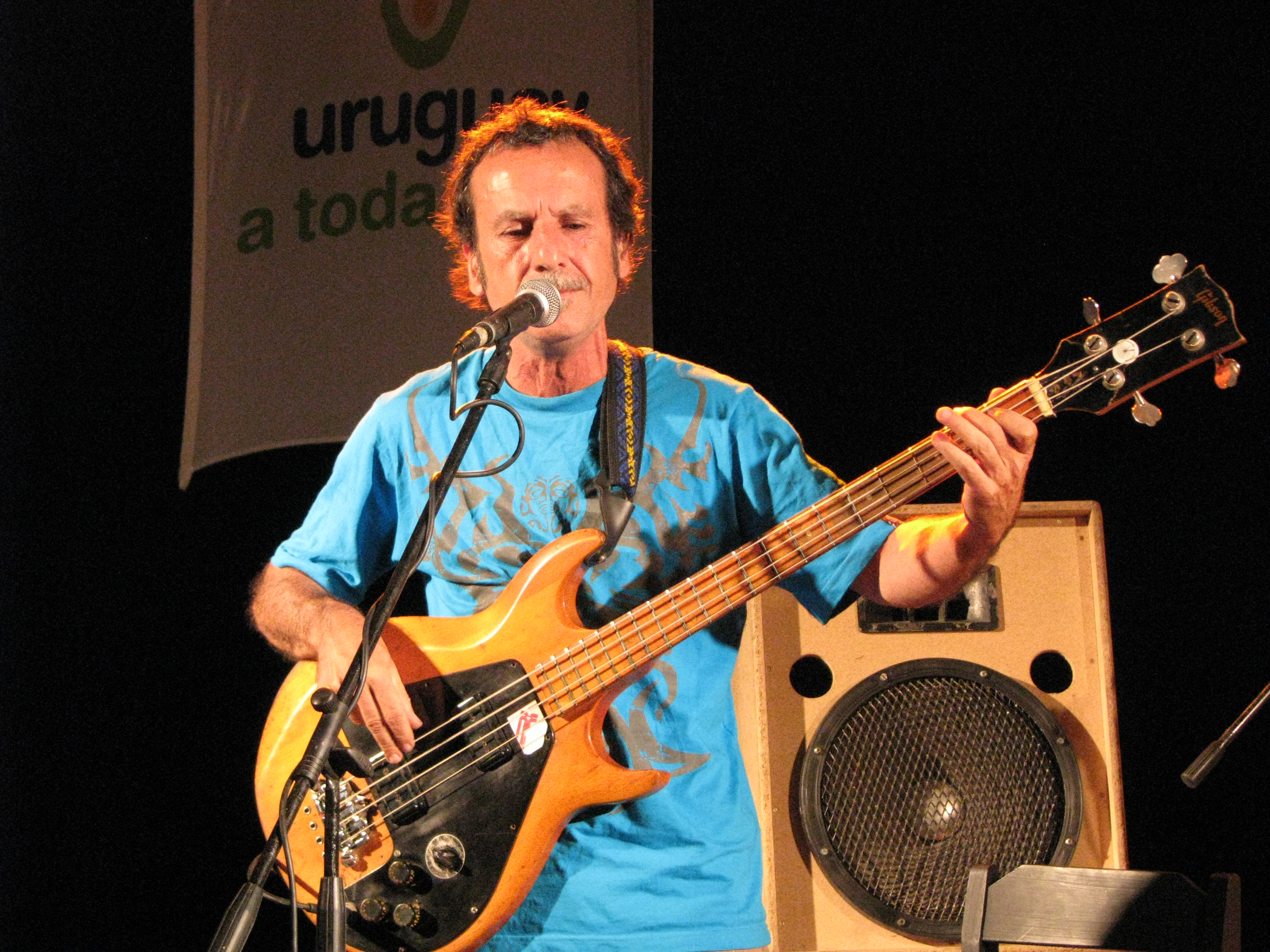

Luis Alberto "Beto" Satragni (1955 – 19 September 2010) was an Uruguayan musician, composer and bassist whose career developed mainly in Argentina.

== Career ==
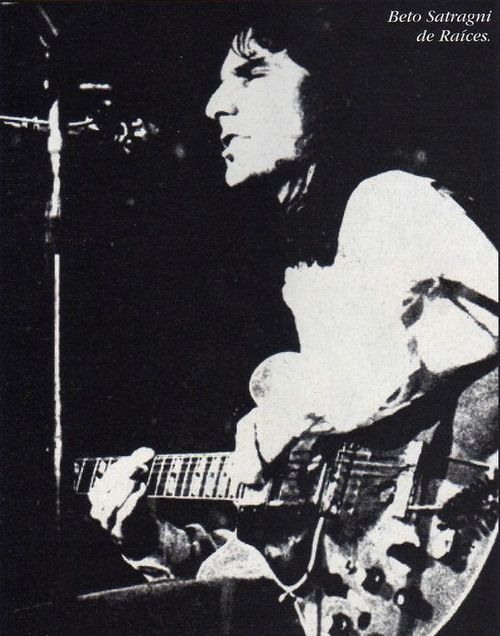
Photograph of Satragni that appeared in the Argentinian magazine Peel. Satragni was an integral part of the group Raíces.

Satragni developed his career in Argentina, as a bassist in Argentine rock bands.

During the 1970s, he formed the candombe-rock band Raíces jointly with Roberto Valencia.

In the early 1980s, he formed a duo with Oscar Moro: Moro-Satragni, and released an eponymous album, including vocals by Charly García, David Lebón and Luis Alberto Spinetta. Satragni later left this group, joining Spinetta Jade. In 1983, he joined David Lebon, and in 1985 joined Ruben Rada's band.

In 1986 he formed "El 60" with Hector Starc, with little impact.

Satragni reprised songs from Spinetta Jade in the December 2009 concert Spinetta and the Eternal Bands, which covered the entire career of Spinetta and his associated acts.

They collaborated with diverse Argentinian musicians such as Moris, Lito Nebbia, Miguel Abuelo, León Gieco, David Lebón and the Uruguayan Osvaldo Fattoruso and Ruben Roadstead, among others.

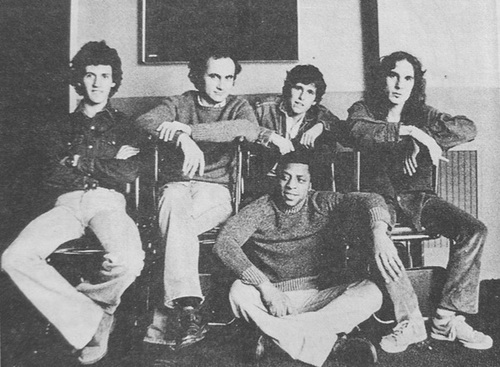
Members of Raíces pictured in 1980: Raúl Cuadro, Alberto Bengolea, Andrés Calamaro, Beto Satragni, and Jimmy Santos.

=== Return to Uruguay ===
In 2002, Satragni returned to Canelones, forming Montevideo Grouve in 2006. He led the group "Emergentes" at a meeting of local bands in the Costa de Oro. The band La Tercera Expedición covered one of his songs.

== Death ==
Satragni died on 19 September 2010 in Montevideo, aged 55.

== Discography ==
Disk	Band	Year	Type
B.O.V. dombe	Raíces	1978	Studio
Los Habitantes de la Rutina	Raíces	1980	Studio
Alma de diamante	Spinetta Jade	1980	Studio
Moro-Satragni	Moro-Satragni	1983	Studio
El 60	El 60	1987	Studio
Ecológico	Solista	1991	Studio
Empalme	Raíces	1995	Studio
Ey Bo Road	Raíces	1997	Studio
Raíces, en vivo	Raíces	1999	Live
Raíces 30 años	Raíces	2008	Studio
