= Los Abuelos de la Nada =

Argentine rock band

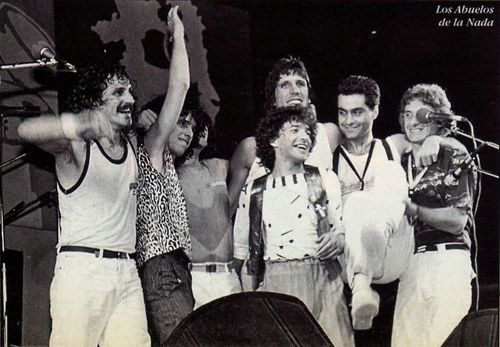

Background information
- Origin: Buenos Aires, Argentina
- Genres: Rock, Argentine rock, funk rock, new wave, reggae fusion jazz fusion
- Years active: 1967–1969; 1981–1985; 1986–1988
- Labels: Interdisc; Polygram
- Past members: Miguel Abuelo; Cachorro López; Andrés Calamaro; Gustavo Bazterrica; Daniel Melingo; Willy Crook; Polo Corbella; Kubero Díaz; Marcelo "Chocolate" Fogo; Juan del Barrio; Pato Loza; Jorge Polanuer; Alfredo Desiata

Los Abuelos de la Nada were an Argentine rock band formed in Buenos Aires in 1967. The group underwent several incarnations throughout its history, with all of them led by its founder and frontman, singer-songwriter Miguel Abuelo. The group produced numerous hit singles in the 1980s as "Sin Gamulán", "Costumbres argentinas", "Mil horas", "Himno de mi corazón", "Lunes por la madrugada" and "No te enamores nunca de aquel marinero bengalí".

== Career ==
=== 1967–1971: Early years and the first Abuelos ===
In the mid-1960s, a club in Barrio Norte, Buenos Aires, named La Cueva was the focal point for rock and roll. Some of the acts sang in English, but others were experimenting with Spanish-language lyrics, notably Tanguito. The regulars of La Cueva also included poetry buffs and young people willing to escape the routines of urban life; some would form the core of the Buenos Aires hippie scene of the late 1960s.

Miguel Peralta was living in the Norte hostel at that time, and was lured into the scene by fellow poetry buff Pipo Lernoud. When a record label, Mandioca, was created specifically to record Spanish-language rock, Peralta arranged for an interview with recording executive Ben Molar in which he claimed, untruthfully, that he had a band called Los Abuelos de la Nada (the Grandparents of Nothingness) which was ready to enter the studio. The name was taken from a passage in El banquete de Severo Arcángelo, a novel by Leopoldo Marechal. Since Molar acquiesced, Peralta went on and assembled a band, featuring friends Claudio Gabis on guitar, the brothers Micky and Alberto "Abuelo" Lara on guitar and bass, Héctor "Pomo" Lorenzo on drums, and Eduardo "Mayoneso" Fanacoa on keyboards. Their first single, Diana Divaga (Diana digresses), featured psychedelic influences. About this time, Miguel started using Abuelo as his artistic surname.

After Gabis left the band (he was attending college and was reluctant to commit to the band), Abuelo recruited Norberto Napolitano (Pappo). After some more psychedelic-oriented fare, Pappo started nudging the band in the direction of blues, causing Abuelo to leave. Over time, Pappo's project mutated into Pappo's Blues.

Abuelo tried to create new bands, and for a short time was singer of El Huevo (the Egg), which would later become the core of Pescado Rabioso. Abuelo took off to Barcelona, Spain, in 1971 to try to re-launch his music career. Abuelo spent ten years in Europe, until bass player Cachorro López, who was a popular session musician with reggae and funk bands, convinced him to return to Argentina for a second incarnation of the band.

=== 1981–83: Comeback and the new beginning ===
The new band had Abuelo as lead singer, Cachorro López on bass guitar, Andrés Calamaro on vocals and keyboards, Gustavo Bazterrica on guitar, Daniel Melingo on sax, and Polo Corbella on the drums.

The 1982 Falklands War was a catalyst for Argentine rock, as songs with English-language lyrics were not broadcast for several months. The band's materials were favored by radio DJs, including "No te enamores nunca de aquel marinero bengalí" (Never fall in love with that Bengali sailor) which grew out of improvisation during rehearsals, and "Sin gamulán" (Without a coat), written by Calamaro.

Charly García took the band under his wing after dissolving Serú Girán, and the Abuelos played in García's 1982 Christmas concert. García also drafted López, Melingo and Calamaro for his band, in parallel with their work for the Abuelos.

The 1982 debut album included many compositions by Abuelo-López, and a reggae hit by Calamaro's former partner Gringui Herrera, "Tristezas de la ciudad" (City blues).

For their 1983 album, Vasos y besos (Glasses and Kisses), Melingo wrote his own reggae hit: "Chala-man", Bazterrica contributed "No se desesperen" (Don't despair), and Calamaro chimed in with "Mil horas" (A thousand hours).

=== 1984–85: International breakthrough, struggles and break-up ===
The band became popular with rockers and more pop-oriented audiences. Especially, Calamaro was favored by teenage girls looking for an "edgier" idol than balladeer Alejandro Lerner. Vasos y besos had sold a solid 160,000 records, and was presented in a six-month country-wide tour.

Record executives arranged to send the band to Ibiza for the recording of their 1984 album Himno de mi Corazón (Hymn of my heart), which became a sales hit as expected. Later that year, Melingo, who was also working with García and his own band Los Twist, left, and was replaced by Alfredo Desiata.

By early 1985, the band's spirits were damaged due to Bazterrica's cocaine addiction, which eventually had him fired from the band, and the rivalry between Abuelo and Calamaro for top billing.

About that time, Calamaro wrote what would be his last mega-hit with the band: "Costumbres argentinas" (Argentine habits). Sensing that the band was on the verge of dissolution, the band recorded a live album in the Opera theater in Buenos Aires in May 1985. For the occasion, Gringui Herrera replaced Bazterrica, Juan del Barrio reinforced Calamaro in keyboards, and Melingo played some songs as a guest musician.

This line-up played their last gig in October 1985, in José Amalfitani Stadium, to fulfill their contractual obligation to the "Rock and Pop" festival which featured INXS and Nina Hagen. The crowd reacted badly to the band's evident lack of motivation (the pouring rain and the badly mixed sound did not help), and Abuelo was hit in the face by a bottle hurled from the field. The band played the remainder of their set with Abuelo visibly bleeding. After the show, Los Abuelos members disbanded indefinitely.

=== 1986–88: Revival and Miguel Abuelo's death ===
With the band dissolved, Abuelo started playing small venues, harking back to his roots of poetry-influenced songwriting. Late in 1986, he and Polo Corbella hired Kubero Díaz on guitar, Marcelo "Chocolate" Fogo on bass and Juan del Barrio on keyboards to form a new line-up, which recorded Cosas mías in 1986 with relative commercial success. After the first shows, Polo Corbella left the band, replaced by Claudio "Pato" Loza, then with the addition of Willy Crook (former Patricio Rey y sus Redonditos de Ricota) on sax.

In late 1987, following gallbladder surgery, Miguel Abuelo was diagnosed with AIDS; terminally ill, he died from cardiac arrest a few days after his 42nd birthday. That was the end of the Abuelos as a band; the remaining members reunited several times, with different formations. Notably, Miguel's son Gato played with Calamaro, Bazterrica and Corbella in a 1997 reunion.

The rights to the Abuelos de la Nada name were offered by Abuelo's widow Krisha Bogdan to Kubero Díaz, who refused out of respect. At some point during 2001, it was reported that Bogdan and Gato were fighting in court over the rights to the name and to Miguel Abuelo's unpublished recordings.

== Legacy ==
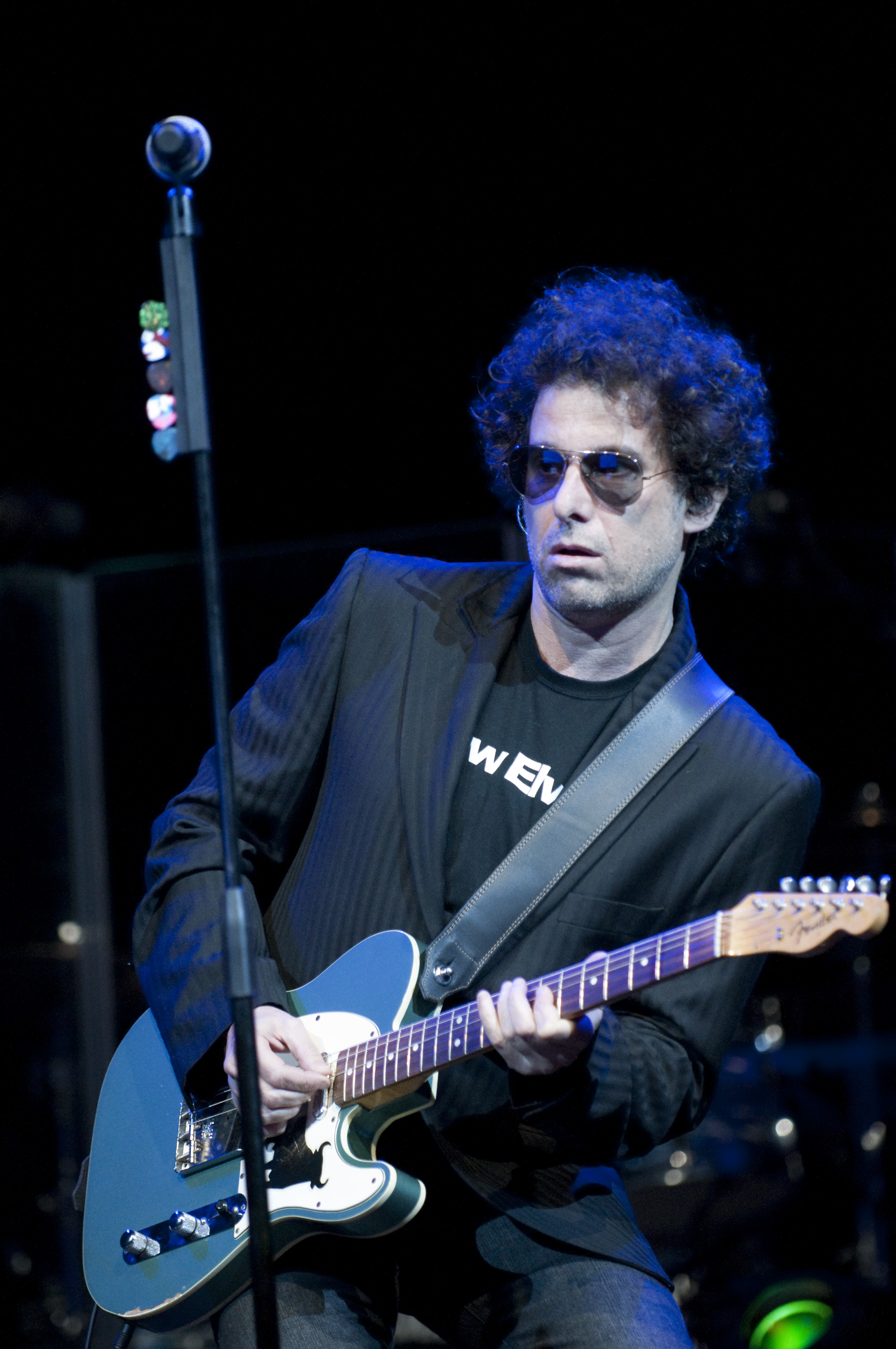
Andrés Calamaro in 2009

Several compilations mastered by López were issued after the band's demise. The band eventually sold more records after its dissolution than during its successes of the 1980s. Many former Abuelos are still in the limelight, notably Calamaro, who has had a successful career in both Argentina and Spain, first with Los Rodríguez in the 1990s, and then as solo act. Cachorro Lopez was member of Miguel Mateos' backing band after his retirement of Los Abuelos, and since the 1990s work as producer to Sony Music. Daniel Melingo travelled to Spain (together with Polo Corbella) in 1986, after Los Twist break-up and come back to Argentina as tango artist with his new band Los Ramones del Tango. Gustavo Bazterrica formed Los Bazterricolas and Polo Corbella returned to Buenos Aires as María Rosa Yorio, Raúl Porchetto as Miguel Mateos drummer.

The final members: Kubero Diaz, reformed his old band La Cofradía de la Flor Solar in the next decade, Willy Crook formed Los Funky Torinos in 1997 after some years as solo act, Juan del Barrio is now teacher of piano and musical arrangements, and played with Luis Alberto Spinetta at Velez Sarfield stadium in 2009.

The songs "Lunes por la madrugada" and "Himno de mi corazón" were also featured in the 2022 film Argentina, 1985.

== Discography ==
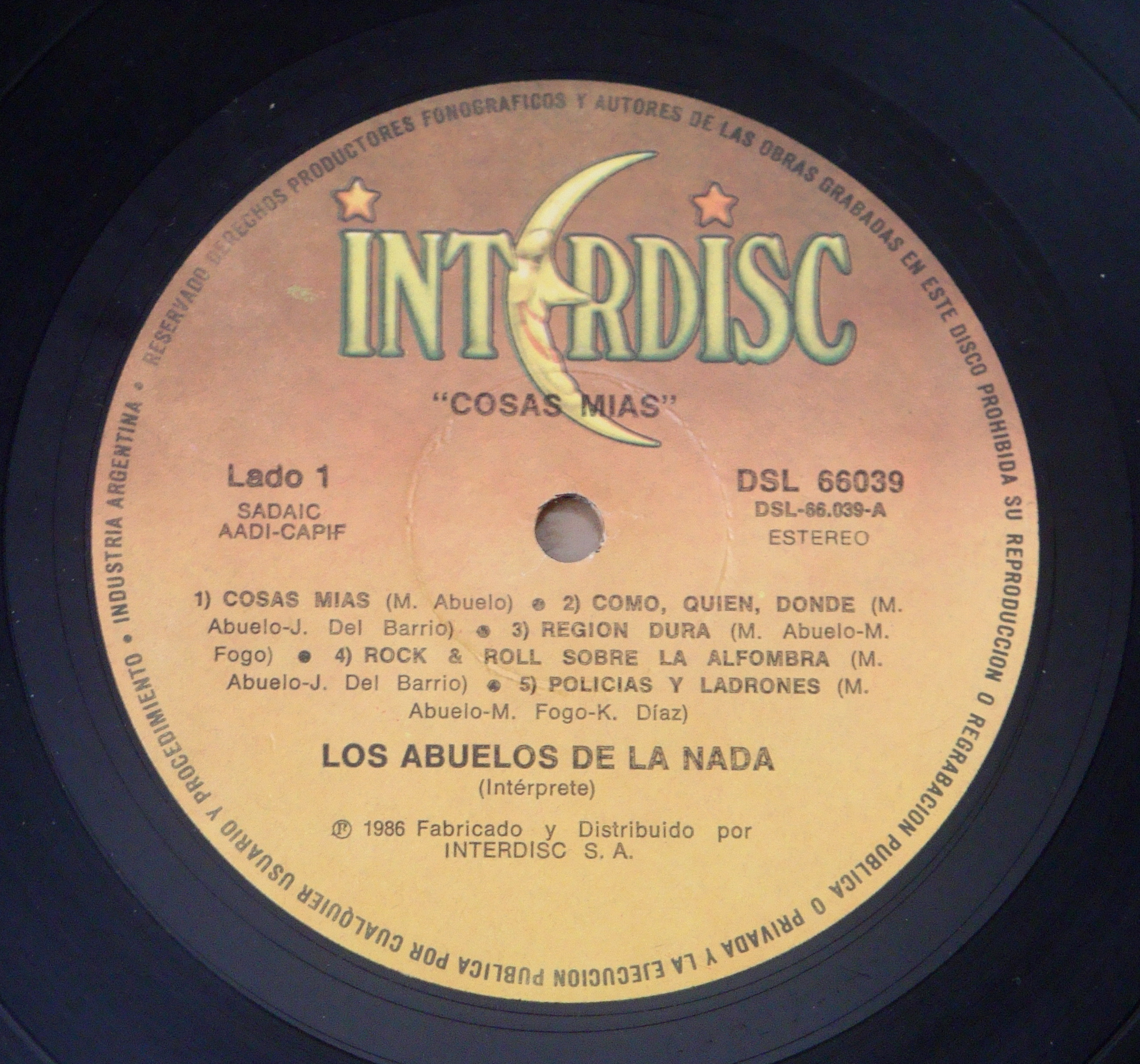

=== Singles ===
- "Diana Divaga" (1968)
- "En la Estación" -Without Miguel Abuelo- (1969)

=== Albums ===
==== Studio albums ====
- Los Abuelos de la Nada (1982)
- Vasos y besos (1983)
- Himno de mi corazón (1984)
- Cosas mías (1986)

==== Live albums ====
- Los Abuelos en el Ópera (1985)
