= El banquete de Severo Arcángelo =

1965 novel by Leopoldo Marechal

- Author: Leopoldo Marechal
- Language: Spanish
- Publisher: Editorial Sudamericana
- Publication date: 1965
- Publication place: Argentina
- Pages: 289

El banquete de Severo Arcángelo (lit. 'The Banquet of Severo Arcángelo') is a 1965 novel by the Argentine writer Leopoldo Marechal. It revolves around a mysterious banquet at an estate in San Isidro and the labyrinthine investigation of its purpose. It was Marechal's second novel, published 17 years after his first, Adam Buenosayres.

The Argentine rock band Los Abuelos de la Nada (lit. 'The Grandparents of Nothingness') took its name from a passage in the novel.
