= Costumbres argentinas =

1985 single by Los Abuelos de la Nada

Single by Los Abuelos de la Nada

from the album Los Abuelos en el Ópera
- Language: Spanish
- English title: Argentine Customs
- B-side: "Zig zag"
- Released: June 15, 1985
- Genre: Pop rock; new wave
- Length: 3:10
- Label: CDA
- Songwriter: Andres Calamaro
- Producer: Los Abuelos de la Nada

Music video
- Costumbres argentinas on YouTube

"Costumbres argentinas" (English: Argentine traditions) is a song by Argentine band Los Abuelos de la Nada. It was written by Andrés Calamaro and is included on the live album Los Abuelos en el Ópera, released in 1985. It was recorded during three sessions between June 14 and 16, 1985. The song was released as a single that same year and has since been ranked at No. 59 in the 100 great songs from the 80s in Spanish, according to VH1 Latin America, and No. 14 in the 100 top songs of the Argentine rock.

The song was recorded live by the group for their only live album in 1985. There are only three versions of the song: the album version in May 1985, a second live recording released as part of the compilation album Himnos del corazón 1982-1987 in 2004, and an unreleased version at the Rock & Pop Festival in October of the same year. By December 1985, nearly the entire lineup of the band would change, with only Miguel Abuelo and Polo Corbella staying in the group.

Although considered one of Calamaro's most emblematic songs, it was never recorded in studio by the band. The song remains an occasional part of the Calamaro's solo repertoire and performed the song during his Alta Suciedad tour in Barcelona in 1998.

In 2001, the song was included on the soundtrack of the TV show Culpables. Fabiana Cantilo recorded a cover of the song for the album En la vereda del sol in 2009.

== Single release ==
Side A
"Costumbres argentinas"
Side B
"Zig Zag"

== Personnel ==
At the time of recording of the live album, Los Abuelos de la Nada were composed of the following musicians, including two guests:

- Andrés Calamaro – keyboards and vocals
- Miguel Abuelo – backing vocals and percussion
- Cachorro López – backing vocals and bass
- Polo Corbella – drums
- Alfredo Desiata – saxophone
- Juan del Barrio – keyboards

Guests

- Daniel Melingo – backing vocals and rhythm guitar
- Gringui Herrera – lead guitar
