= Jacobo Fijman =

Argentine poet (1898–1970)

Jacobo Fijman (25 January 1898 – 1 December 1970) was an Argentine poet born in Orhei, Bessarabia, now in Moldova. He moved to Argentina with his parents in 1902.

Raised in humble circumstances, Fijman was a highly intelligent child interested in art, music, and literature; he later made a modest living as a French teacher and itinerant violinist until a series of mental breakdowns lead to his permanent (and, according to Fijman, not always unpleasant) residency at the Borda Asylum from 1942 until his death. Fijman was keenly interested in religion and religious visions, part of the reason for his conversion from Judaism to Catholicism in 1930.

The poetry of Jacobo Fijman is often metaphysical, and has traces of surrealism. Fijman published three volumes of poems in his life: Molino rojo, Hecho de estampas, and Estrella de la Mañana.

His personality inspired the fictional character of Samuel Tesler from Adán Buenosayres, the widely recognized novel written by Leopoldo Marechal.

He died in 1970 at a hospice in at the Borda Hospital, Buenos Aires.
