= Jimmy Santos =

Jimmy Santos may refer to:

- Jimmy Santos (singer), Afro-Uruguayan vocalist
- Jimmy Santos (actor) (born 1951), Filipino actor, comedian, TV host and former basketball player
