= Juan J. Colomer =

Spanish composer

Juan José Colomer (born Juan José Revueltas Colomer in Alzira, Valencia, Spain, 1966) is a Spanish composer.

== Personal life ==
Juan Colomer started his music studies at age eight in his local music school, "Sociedad Musical de Alzira." He continued his studies in the Conservatorio Superior de Música de Valencia, where he graduated in trumpet and composition. In 1990 he moved to Boston where he studied Film Scoring at Berklee College of Music.

In 1992 he moved to Los Angeles, his actual residence, where he started working as a film composer, as well as arranging and producing for other artists. He has worked and collaborated with artists like Alejandro Fernández, Bebu Silvetti, Juan Carlos Calderón, Vinnie Colaiuta, and Ramón Flores.

In 1999 he recorded a CD with his own songs in Spanish, under the name of Bella y oscura, entitled "Reina en prisión" (queen in prison) with Esmeralda Grao as the lead singer.

In 2006 he became an American citizen and now has dual Spanish-American citizenship.

He is also known by his nickname in Spain Juanjo Colomer.

== Career ==
His classical work, as a composer or orchestrator, has been performed and recorded by James Levine, Plácido Domingo, José Carreras, Christian Lindberg, Los Angeles Philharmonic, San Francisco Symphony, Vienna Symphony orchestra, Orchestre de Paris, Simón Bolívar Youth Orchestra, Orchestra & choir of the Arena di Verona, Russian National Orchestra, Orquesta de la Comunidad Valenciana, Orquesta de Castilla y León and Spanish Brass. He has worked regularly with Plácido Domingo as an orchestrator for the Christmas in Vienna series of concerts, as well as The three tenors concerts in Paris 1998 and Monterrey in 2005, the Arena de Verona and the Operalia anthem. Recently he arranged and orchestrated several of the tracks for the CD Pasión española (Spanish passion) with Plácido Domingo and the Orquesta de la Comunidad de Madrid conducted by Miguel Roa, for the Deutsche Grammophon label. This CD won a Grammy for Best Classical Album at the 2008 Latin Grammy Awards.

Juan J. Colomer has received commissions from the National orchestra of Spain (OCNE), International Horn Symposium, Center for Contemporary Music (CDMC), International Philip Jones competition (Guebwiller, France) and Instituto Valenciano de la Música (IVM).

In 1991 he won a composition prize in Madrid for his piece "Añoranzas" for Harp. He was also nominated for two consecutive years for an Euterpe award by the Federación de sociedades musicales valencianas for his piece "Raíces" for best symphonic work.

In 2010 he created a non profit organization called "Artistic Soirées" that hosts monthly concerts in Los Angeles. He is the co-founder, with conductor Ignazio Terrasi, of the LA Grand Ensemble, a flexible formation that incorporates visual elements into their concerts.

His works have been performed at prestigious halls like Carnegie Hall (NY), Tchaikovsky Concert Hall (Moscow), Teatro Real (Madrid) or Walt Disney Concert Hall (Los Angeles).

Juan Colomer publishes his works with Editions BIM of Switzerland, Editorial Piles, Tritó, and Rivera editores in Spain.

== Compositions ==
=== Operas ===
- El Pintor, symphonic opera in 3 acts
- Dulcinea XL, chamber opera in 2 acts

=== Ballets ===
- Sorolla

=== Vocal orchestral works ===
- Agua que no has de beber, for choir & orchestra
- Fallen Angels, Oratorio for soloists, choir & orchestra

=== Orchestral works ===
- A casual walk to extinction
- Air in light of darkness
- Convergencias
- Ciento Volando
- Escaping insanity
- Escenas pintorescas (Picturesque scenes)
- Esperpento cubista
- La ancestral letania, for viola & orchestra
- La complicidad del espectro
- La Devota Lasciva, for brass quintet & orchestra
- Naturaleza Humana, for horn, choir of horns & orchestra
- Preludio de Dulcinea
- Sorolla breve suite
- Symphonic genesis
- Symphonic vignettes, for trumpet & orchestra
- Adagio, for strings
- Concerto Nº 1, for piano & orchestra

=== Works for symphony wind orchestra ===
- Raices
- Chova
- Feb 93
- Josep Pau

=== Vocal works ===
- Ave Maria, for soprano & orchestra
- Canciones de entretiempo
- Canciones en femenino
- Lied, for soprano & piano
- Magnificat, Choir SATB & brass quintet
- Silent ceremony, Children's chorus, mixed chorus, oboe, harp & organ

=== Chamber music ===
- Comfortably familiar (and peacefully numb), String quartet & piano
- Como pez en su pecera, for brass trio & percussion
- Concerto breve, for solo trombone
- Danzas Anacrónicas, for violin, cello & piano
- Decadence, for oboe, horn & piano
- Dialogos inmencionables, for solo trombone & brass quintet
- Downtown Bagatelles, for violin & piano
- Easy pieces for professional musicians, Viola & piano
- EB-1, for violin & piano
- Fierabrass, for brass ensemble
- Gabrieli según San Juan
- Gestas de un Don Nadie, for solo trumpet & brass quintet
- Historia de un muntante, for brass quintet
- Lisonjas de la alcahueta, for euphonium & brass quintet
- Los cinco mosqueteros, for brass quintet
- Mar sin Luna, Horn & Piano (also cello & piano)
- Obertura y Chacona, for trumpet & organ
- Obsession, for two violins & piano
- Patterns of behavior, String quartet, clarinet & Vibraphone/Marimba
- Quintet, for five flutes
- Realidades disipadas, for cello & piano
- Semana Santa en Gomorra, for large ensemble
- Separation, for violin & piano
- Sonata, for trumpet & piano
- The allure of despair, for violin, cello & piano
- The charlatan's daughter, for 2 solo trombones & brass quintet
- The existential tourist, for cello & piano
- Thelma & Louise on a Vespa, 2 trombones & piano
- Tiempos, for string quartet
- The exile of time, for string quartet
- Trio, for flute, viola & harp
- Visions, for horn & piano
- Viveros, for flute, cello & piano

=== Works for piano ===
- Autumn notebook
- El ladrón de memorias, for solo piano
- Influjo, for solo piano
- Decadence, for oboe, horn & piano
- EB-1, for violin & piano
- Realidades disipadas, for cell & piano
- Sonata, for trumpet & piano
- Viveros, for flute, cello & piano

=== Works for harp ===
- Trio, for flute, viola & harp
- Añoranzas

=== Film music ===
- A day without a Mexican
- A letter to Rachel
- Acts of love
- Aimee Price
- Bobby
- CNB
- Cronique de la Decouverte
- Dangerous cargo
- Dark honeymoon
- Distorted Images
- Double or nothing
- Fat free
- First date
- For better and for worse
- Getting Rachel back
- Invisible temptation
- Last Kill
- Learning to lead
- Luna
- Maradentro
- Mulholland ceremonies
- Pacifico inedito
- Rewrite
- Shakespeare...in & out
- Sunsplit
- Sylvia's Baklava
- Ten seconds
- The box
- The Crimson hour
- The Mexican dream
- The Wall
- Three short pieces
- Yellow belle
