= Nadie sale vivo de aquí =

Studio album by Andrés Calamaro
- Released: 1989
- Genre: Rock en español Rock
- Length: 31:33
- Language: Spanish
- Label: Sony Music

Andrés Calamaro chronology
Live en Ayacucho '88 (1988)	Nadie sale vivo de aquí (1989)	Alta Suciedad (1997)

Professional ratings
Review scores
Source	Rating
Allmusic	5/5 stars

Nadie sale vivo de aquí, is the fourth studio album by Argentine musician Andrés Calamaro, released in 1989.

== Track listing ==
All tracks are written by Andrés Calamaro

No.	Title	Length
1.	"Nadie Sale Vivo de Aqui [ Nobody comes out alive from here]"	1:31
2.	"Pero sin sangre [But without blood]"	2:31
3.	"Vietnam"	0:53
4.	"Pasemos a otro tema [Let's move on to another topic]"	2:22
5.	"Con la soga al cuello [With the rope around the neck]"	2:20
6.	"No tengo tiempo [I have no time]"	1:45
7.	"Señoritas [Ladies]"	1:44
8.	"Adiós, amigos, adiós [Goodbye, friends, goodbye]"	2:56
9.	"Ni hablar [No way]"	2:59
10.	"Una deuda del corazón (Traicionero) [ A debt of the heart (treacherous)]"	2:38
11.	"No me vuelvas la espalda por eso [ Do not turn your back on me]"	1:58
12.	"Señal que te he perdido [Sign that I have lost you]"	3:17
13.	"Vietnam" (feat. Fito Paez and Gustavo Cerati)	0:47
14.	"Dos Romeos [Two Romeos]"	3:52
