= El Cantante (Andrés Calamaro album) =

Studio album by Andrés Calamaro
- Released: March 2nd, 2004
- Recorded: 2004
- Genre: Pop, rock
- Label: Warner Music
- Producer: Javier Limón

Andrés Calamaro chronology
El Salmón (2000)	El Cantante (2004)	El Regreso (2005)

Professional ratings
Review scores
Source	Rating
Allmusic	4/5 stars

El Cantante is a studio album by Andrés Calamaro. Initially it was going to include only covers from Latinoamerican artists but in the end three new songs recorded by Calamaro were added. The album and title track name comes from the song 'El Cantante', originally composed by Rubén Blades and performed by Héctor Lavoe.

== Track listing ==
1. Malena (Lucio Demare, Homero Manzi) - 2:28
2. Volver (Carlos Gardel, Alfredo Le Pera) - 3:12
3. La Distancia (Roberto Carlos) - 3:56
4. Estadio Azteca (Andrés Calamaro, Marcelo Scornik) - 3:40
5. Sus Ojos Se Cerraron (Carlos Gardel, Alfredo Le Pera) - 3:52
6. Algo Contigo (Chico Novarro) - 3:20
7. El Arriero (Atahualpa Yupanqui) - 2:40
8. La Libertad (Andrés Calamaro, Gringui Herrera) - 3:15
9. Alfonsina y el mar / Zamba de mi esperanza (Félix Luna, Ariel Ramírez) - 4:53
10. Las Oportunidades (Andrés Calamaro) - 3:05
11. Voy a Perder la Cabeza por tu Amor (Manuel Alejandro, Ana Magdalena) - 4:46
12. El Cantante (Rubén Blades) - 4:38
