= La Lengua Popular =

Studio album by Andrés Calamaro
- Released: 2007
- Recorded: 2007
- Genre: Rock
- Length: 40:27
- Label: Warner Music
- Producer: Cachorro López

Andrés Calamaro chronology
El Palacio de las Flores (2006)	La Lengua Popular (2007)	On the Rock (2010)

Singles from La Lengua Popular (The Popular Tongue)
- 1. "5 Minutos Más (Minibar) (5 More Minutes (Minibar))" Released: 2007; 2. "Carnaval de Brasil (Brazil's Carnival)" Released: 2007; 3. "Los Chicos (The Guys)" Released: 2008; 4. "Mi Gin Tonic (My Gin Tonic)" Released: 2008; 5. "Soy Tuyo (I'm Yours)" Released: 2008

La Lengua Popular (The Popular Tongue) is the 17th album by Argentine musician and composer Andrés Calamaro, released by Dro Atlantic in 2007. Its cover art was created by cartoonist Liniers. Since 2007 the album has sold 70.000 copies.

== Track listing ==
1. Los Chicos (The Guys)(Andrés Calamaro) - 3:11
2. Carnaval de Brasil (Brazil's Carnival)(Andrés Calamaro, Cachorro López) - 4:10
3. 5 Minutos Más (Minibar) (5 More Minutes (Minibar))(Andrés Calamaro, Cachorro López) - 3:34
4. Soy Tuyo (I'm Yours)(Andrés Calamaro, Miguel Cantillo, Joaquín Sabina, Jaime Urrutia, Marcelo Scornik) - 3:15
5. Mi Gin Tonic (My Gin Tonic)(Andrés Calamaro, Cachorro López) - 2:53
6. La Espuma de las Orillas (The Spume from the Seasides)(Andrés Calamaro, Cachorro López) - 3:01
7. Cada una de tus Cosas (Each One Of Your Things)(Andrés Calamaro) - 3:29
8. Comedor Piquetero (Picketer Dining)(Andrés Calamaro) - 3:14
9. Sexy & Barrigón (Sexy & Big-Bellied)(Andrés Calamaro, Cachorro López) - 3:37
10. De Orgullo y de Miedo (Of Proudness And Fear)(Andrés Calamaro) - 3:38
11. La Mitad del Amor (The Half Of The Love)(Andrés Calamaro, Cachorro López) - 3:45
12. Mi Cobain (Superjoint) (My Cobain (Superjoint))(Andrés Calamaro) - 2:40

== Charts ==
Charts	Peak position
Argentinian Albums Chart (2007)	1
Spain Albums Chart (2007)	56
Mexican Albums Chart (2007)	69
Spain Albums Chart (2008–09)	96

== Sales and certifications ==
Region	Certification	Certified units/sales
Argentina (CAPIF)	2× Platinum	80,000^{^}
^{^} Shipments figures based on certification alone.
