= El Regreso (album) =

Live album by Andrés Calamaro
- Released: 2005
- Recorded: 2005
- Genre: Rock
- Label: DRO Atlantic

Andrés Calamaro chronology
El Cantante (2004)	El Regreso (2005)	Tinta Roja (2006)

El Regreso is a live album by Andrés Calamaro. The album title means "the return" and marks the comeback of Andres Calamaro onto the musical scene following a personal crisis that was the result of breaking up with his longtime girlfriend.

The album was recorded during shows at Estadio Luna Park in Buenos Aires.

== Track listing ==
1. El Cantante (Rubén Blades) - 5:00
2. El Salmón (Andrés Calamaro, Marcelo Scornik) - 2:48
3. Te Quiero Igual (Andrés Calamaro, Clota Ponieman) - 3:53
4. Tuyo Siempre (Andrés Calamaro) - 3:09
5. Las Opportunidades (Andrés Calamaro) - 3:19
6. Clonazepán y Circo (Andrés Calamaro, Marcelo Scornik, Gringui Herrera) - 3:00
7. Para No Olvidar (Andrés Calamaro) - 4:24
8. Los Aviones (Andrés Calamaro) - 4:26
9. Crímenes Perfectos (Andrés Calamaro) - 4:22
10. Loco (Andrés Calamaro) - 2:34
11. Vigilante Medio Argentino (Marcelo Scornik, Andrés Calamaro) - 2:40
12. La Libertad (Andrés Calamaro, Gringui Herrera) - 3:23
13. Estadio Azteca (Marcelo Scornik, Andrés Calamaro) - 4:01
14. Por Una Cabeza (Alfredo Le Pera, Carlos Gardel) - 3:13
15. Nos Volveremos a Ver (Jorge Larrosa, Andrés Calamaro) - 3:14
16. Media Verónica (Andrés Calamaro) - 3:55
17. No Me Nombres (Marcelo Scornik, Andrés Calamaro) - 3:58
18. Desconfío (Norberto Napolitano) - 4:30
19. OK Perdón (Andrés Calamaro) - 2:50
20. Flaca (Andrés Calamaro) - 4:16
21. Paloma (Andrés Calamaro) - 5:36

== Certification ==
Region	Certification	Certified units/sales
Argentina (CAPIF)	3× Platinum	120,000^{^}
^{^} Shipments figures based on certification alone.
