= On the Rock (Andrés Calamaro album) =

Studio album by Andrés Calamaro
- Released: June 1, 2010
- Genre: Latin rock
- Length: 47:29
- Language: Spanish
- Label: Warner Music
- Producer: Andrés Calamaro; Guido Nisenson; Candy Caramelo

Andrés Calamaro chronology
| La Lengua Popular (2007) | On the Rock (2010) | Bohemio (2013) |

Singles from On the Rock
- 1. "Los Divinos"; 2. "Tres Marías"; 3. "Flor De Samurai"; 4. "El Perro"; 5. "Gomontonera"; 6. "Me Envenenaste"

Professional ratings
Review scores
| Source | Rating |
|---|---|
| Rolling Stone Magazine | link |
| Allmusic | link |

On the Rock is the 20th studio album by Argentine singer-songwriter Andrés Calamaro, released on June 1, 2010.

== Track listing ==
| No. | Title | Writer(s) | Length |
|---|---|---|---|
| 1. | "Barcos [Ships]" (featuring Diego El Cigala and Niño Josele) | Andrés Calamaro | 3:54 |
| 2. | "Te extraño [I Miss You]" (featuring El Langui) | Calamaro, Candy Caramelo, El Langui | 4:25 |
| 3. | "El Pasodoble de los amigos ausentes [Paso Doble of the Absent Friends]" | Calamaro | 2:58 |
| 4. | "Todos se van [Everybody Go]" | Calamaro | 3:32 |
| 5. | "Los divinos [The Divines]" | Calamaro | 2:47 |
| 6. | "Flor de samurai" | Calamaro, Gringui Herrera | 2:51 |
| 7. | "Insoportablemente cruel [Unbearable Cruel]" (featuring Calle 13 and Jerry Gonzalez) | Calamaro, René Pérez | 4:32 |
| 8. | "Tres Marías" | Calamaro | 3:33 |
| 9. | "Te solté la rienda" (featuring Enrique Bunbury) | José Alfredo Jiménez | 2:34 |
| 10. | "Me envenenaste [You Poisoned Me]" | Calamaro | 3:01 |
| 11. | "Gomontonera" | Calamaro | 3:15 |
| 12. | "El perro [The Dog]" | Calamaro, Marcelo Scornik | 2:26 |

=== Bonus tracks ===
| No. | Title | Writer(s) | Length |
|---|---|---|---|
| 13. | "Insoportablemente Cruel [Puerto Rico Mix]" (featuring Calle 13) | Calamaro, Residente |
| 14. | "Tres Marías [Pablo Lescano Mix]" (featuring Pablo Lescano and Vicentico) | Calamaro |

=== Digipack Deluxe ===
The Digipack Deluxe includes:

CD Extra
| No. | Title | Writer(s) | Length |
|---|---|---|---|
| 1. | "Samurai (Central Station)" |
| 2. | "Tortura china (featuring Calle 13)" |
| 3. | "Todos se van (Armonía Molecular)" | Calamaro |
| 4. | "Tres Marías (NQCP)" | Calamaro |
| 5. | "Perdóname" |
| 6. | "Vasos Vacíos (Fabuloso Tributo)" | Vicentico |

== Personnel ==
- Andrés Calamaro – Lead vocals, guitars, keyboards.
- Julián Kanewsky – guitars.
- Diego García – guitars.
- Tito Dávila – guitars.
- Candy Caramelo – Bass.
- José "El Niño" Bruno – Drums.
- Andrés Calamaro, Guido Nisenson and Candy Caramelo – Producers.
- Guido Nisenson – Engineer.

== Videoclips ==
1. Los Divinos
2. Tres Marias (featuring Dante Spinetta, Emmanuel Horvilleur, Miranda!, Pablo Lescano, Vicentico, Zambayonny and Aníbal Fernández)

== Charts ==
| Chart (2010) | Peak position |
|---|---|
| Mexican Albums (Top 100 Mexico) | 43 |
| Spanish Albums (Promusicae) | 1 |
