= Jimmy Santos (singer) =

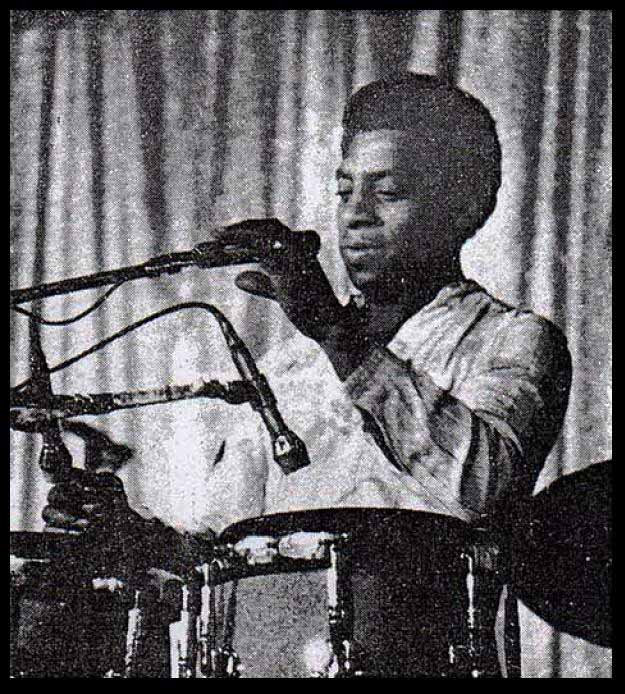

Background information
- Born: Jaime Santos; Montevideo, Uruguay
- Genres: Candombe-Rock; Tango; Folk; Folk rock
- Occupation: Musician
- Instruments: Vocals; drums; percussion
- Formerly of: Raíces
- Website: magicasruinas.com.ar/rock/revrock146.htm

Jimmy Santos is an Afro-Uruguayan popular vocalist of candombe, jazz and rock. Jimmy has lived in Argentina since 1976 and is part of the black population in Argentina. He also plays the drums. In 1977 he joined Raíces. He has a good relationship with Andrés Calamaro the Argentine singer, guitarist and pianist, and works with him.

== Jimmy Santos with Raíces discography ==
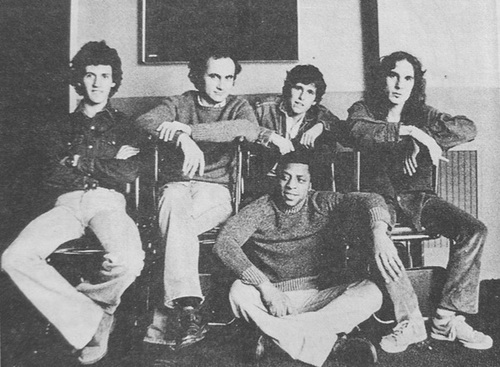
Members of Raíces pictured in 1980: Raúl Cuadro, Alberto Bengolea, Andrés Calamaro, Beto Satragni and Jimmy Santos in 1980

Disco	Banda	Año	Tipo
B.O.V. Dombe	Raíces	1978	Estudio
Los Habitantes de la Rutina	Raíces	1980	Estudio
Ey Bo Road	Raíces	1987	Estudio
Empalme	Raíces	1995	Estudio
Raíces, en vivo	Raíces	1999	Vivo
Raíces, 30 años	Raíces	2008	Estudio
