= Estadio Luna Park =

Sports and events arena in Buenos Aires, Argentina

Luna Park Stadium
- Estadio Luna Park

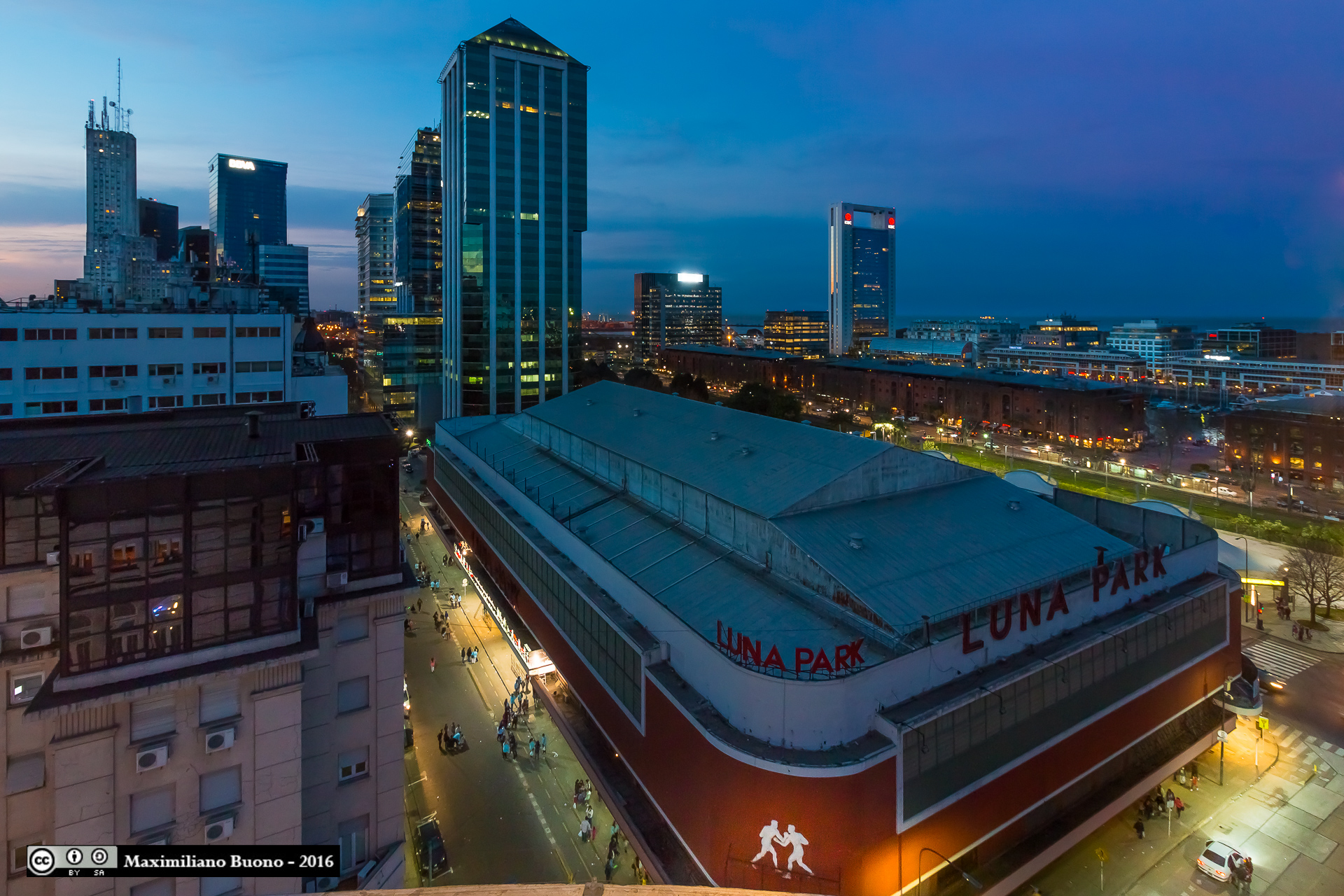
- Aerial view of the venue in 2016
- Interactive map of Luna Park Stadium
- Former names: Estadio de Corrientes y Bouchard (planning/construction)
- Address: Avenida Madero 420; C1106ABE; Buenos Aires; Argentina
- Coordinates: 34°36′08″S 58°22′07″W
- Owner: Salesians of Don Bosco; Cáritas Argentina (50% each)
- Operator: Time For Fun
- Capacity: 8,400
- Type: Arena
- Public transit: at Leandro N. Alem at Correo Central

Construction
- Groundbreaking: 1931
- Opened: 6 February 1932; 94 years ago
- Renovated: 1934, 1951–52, 2006–08
- Cost: AR$2 million
- Architect: Jorge Kálnay
- Structural engineer: Mariani Hnos
- General contractor: Westley Williams y Cía

Website
- lunapark.com.ar

Estadio Luna Park (commonly known as Luna Park) is a multi-purpose arena in Buenos Aires. Located at the corner of Avenida Corrientes and Avenida Bouchard; in the San Nicolás neighborhood. Initially, the arena primarily hosted boxing and other sporting events. In the 1950s, it was expanded to host stage shows and concerts.

The stadium has hosted countless internationally famous personalities, including Pope John Paul II, several ballets, tennis and volleyball matches, world championship and important non-championship boxing fights involving Nicolino Locche, Hugo Corro, Santos Laciar, Carlos Monzón, Omar Narvaez, Juan Roldán, Julio César Vásquez and many other famous boxers, circuses, the Harlem Globetrotters, Holiday on Ice and many more.

The arena also hosted the 1950 FIBA World Championship, the final phase of the 1990 Basketball World Championship and the 1976 Basketball Intercontinental Cup in which Real Madrid won the competition.

The arena also hosted the Six Days of Buenos Aires cycle race.

== History ==
At the beginning of the twentieth century, Buenos Aires was inhabited by thousands of immigrants from Europe. Additionally, there was an abundance of tourists from throughout the Americas. In 1910, Italian merchant Domingo Pace built Luna Park, an open street fair in the heart of the city. By the 1920s, the amusement park became the playground of the aristocrats and wealthy in Argentina. With the change of scenery, the park began to decline and by 1929, many of the rides were abandoned.

In 1931, Ismael Pace (son of Domingo) and boxing legend Jose Pepe Lectoure purchased land from the city. With the decline of Luna Park, Pace envisioned creating a sports arena in the likes of Madison Square Garden and the Berlin Sportpalast. Before opening in 1932, the arena went through three names: "Estadio de Corrientes y Bouchard", "Catedral del Boxeo", then "Palacio de los Deportes", before settling on "Estadio Luna Park" (in remembrance of the now torn down amusement park).

The arena opened in February 1932 as an open-air venue and carnival. Early on, the arena hosted a boxing match every Saturday, with the first match being held on 5 March 1932. At this time, the arena could sit 22,000 spectators. During the off season, the arena ran rampant with the homeless, causing the venue to become an enclosed space in 1934. During the Second World War, the arena became the site of many Nazi and Fascist rallies. In 1944, during a charity event to benefit the victims of an earthquake in San Juan, Eva Duarte and Juan Perón met for the first time.

In the 1950s, the arena began to decline. Lectoure and Pace were pressured by the city to seek better revenue. In 1951, renovations began for the arena in the style of Art Deco, substantially, the capacity of the arena was reduced. Before construction ended, Pace and Lectoure died. Ownership of the venue was given to Lectoure's son, Juan Carlos Lectoure. Known as Tito, he converted the arena into the site for concerts and it became a major venue for the Argentine rock scene.

In 2007, the arena was declared a National Historic Monument. After the death of Tito Lectoure's aunt, Ernestina Devecchi de Lectoure (in 2013), ownership of the arena was transferred to the Argentine branches of Salesians of Don Bosco and Caritas Internationalis, according to what she previously stated in her will. The Salesians Society and Caritas own a 50% each of the arena.

== Notable concerts ==
- Pimpinela
- Molotov
- Cyndi Lauper
- Boy George
- Niall Horan
- Fifth Harmony
- Charly García
- Fito Páez
- GFriend
- Diana Ross
- Ha*Ash
- Martina Stoessel
- Tokio Hotel
- Björk
- Ringo Starr
- Luis Miguel
- Laura Pausini
- Deftones
- David Byrne
- Blur
- Franz Ferdinand
- Pixies
- A-ha
- La Oreja de Van Gogh
- Backstreet Boys
- Alanis Morissette
- Erasure
- Slayer
- Frank Sinatra
- Peter Frampton
- Soy Luna
- Luciano Pavarotti
- Red Hot Chili Peppers
- Hanson
- Judas Priest
- Tarja Turunen
- Nine Inch Nails
- Mark Knopfler
- Oasis
- GOT7
- Nelly Furtado
- Duran Duran
- The Offspring
- ZZ Top
- White Stripes
- Arctic Monkeys
- B52's
- Pet Shop Boys
- CNCO
- Emir Kusturica & The No Smoking Orchestra
- Tom Jones
- Megadeth
- The Rasmus
- Julio Iglesias
- Enrique Iglesias
- Shakira
- Pat Metheny Group
- RBD
- Scorpions
- Whitesnake
- UB40
- Thirty Seconds to Mars
- Dave Matthews Band
- Maroon 5
- John Mayer
- G3
- Dream Theater
- Marco Antonio Solís
- Rita Lee
- Roberto Carlos
- Ivete Sangalo
- Stone Temple Pilots
- Daddy Yankee
- Wisin & Yandel
- Don Omar
- Super Junior
- Sarah Brightman
- Joan Baez
- Quiet Riot
- The Wailers
- Placebo
- Chayanne
- Korn
- Limp Bizkit
- SHINee
- Heaven And Hell
- Roxette
- Deep Purple
- Creedence Clearwater Revisited
- Simply Red
- James Brown
- 4Minute
- B.B. King
- Joss Stone
- The Cranberries
- Nightwish
- Il Divo
- Morrissey
- Empire of the Sun
- Joaquín Sabina
- Faith No More
- Ed Sheeran
- James Blunt
- R5
- Wiz Khalifa
- Capital Cities
- Queens of the Stone Age
- Michael Bolton
- Peter Cetera
- André Rieu
- Noel Gallagher's High Flying Birds
- Disclosure
- Pulp
- The Vamps
- 2Cellos
- Alan Parsons
- Kraftwerk
- New Order
- Garbage
- The Kooks
- Jean-Michel Jarre
- Twice
- The Jacksons
- Monsta X
- Hall & Oates
- Violetta
- Jessie J
- Bryan Adams
- King Crimson
- Patti Smith
- Billy Preston
- Earth Wind and Fire
- Carlos Santana
- Eddy Grant
- Ricardo Arjona
- Barry White
- Kool & the Gang
- Billy Idol
- Sohyang
- LP

'Other artists that have performed at Luna Park include: Blue Man Group, Harlem Globetrotters, other events include Diego Maradona's wedding (1989) and the funerals of Carlos Gardel (1935), Julio Sosa (1964) and Ringo Bonavena (1976).

== Recordings ==
- On August 19 & 20, 2012, the American progressive metal band Dream Theater recorded Live at Luna Park.
- On May 29, 2013, the Finnish singer Tarja Turunen recorded Luna Park Ride.
- Emir Kusturica & No Smoking Orchestra released in 2005 the live DVD Live Is A Miracle In Buenos Aires, recorded at Luna Park.
- Huracanes en Luna plateada live album by Los Piojos was released in 2002.
- El Regreso, by Andrés Calamaro, was released in 2005.

== Gallery ==
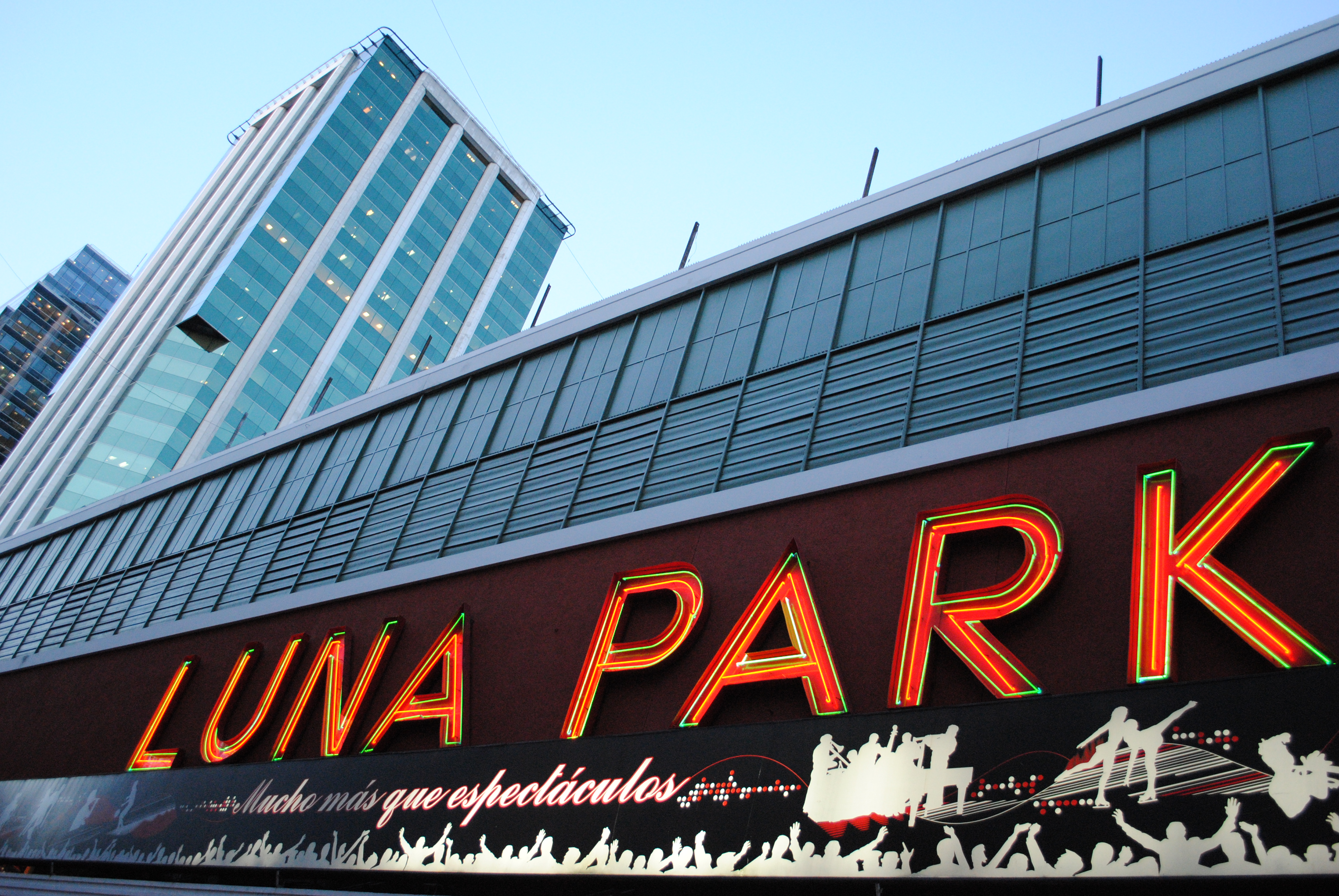

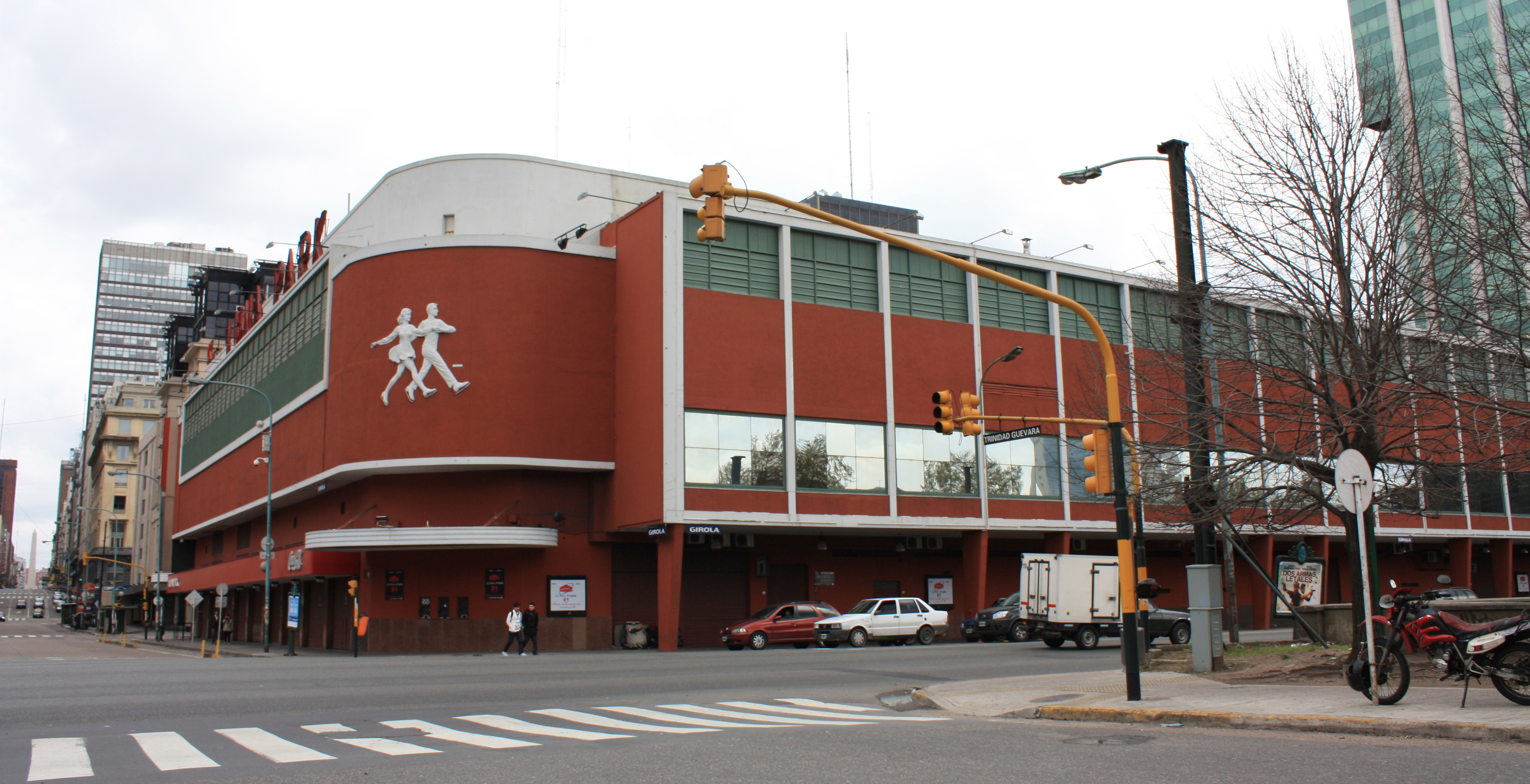

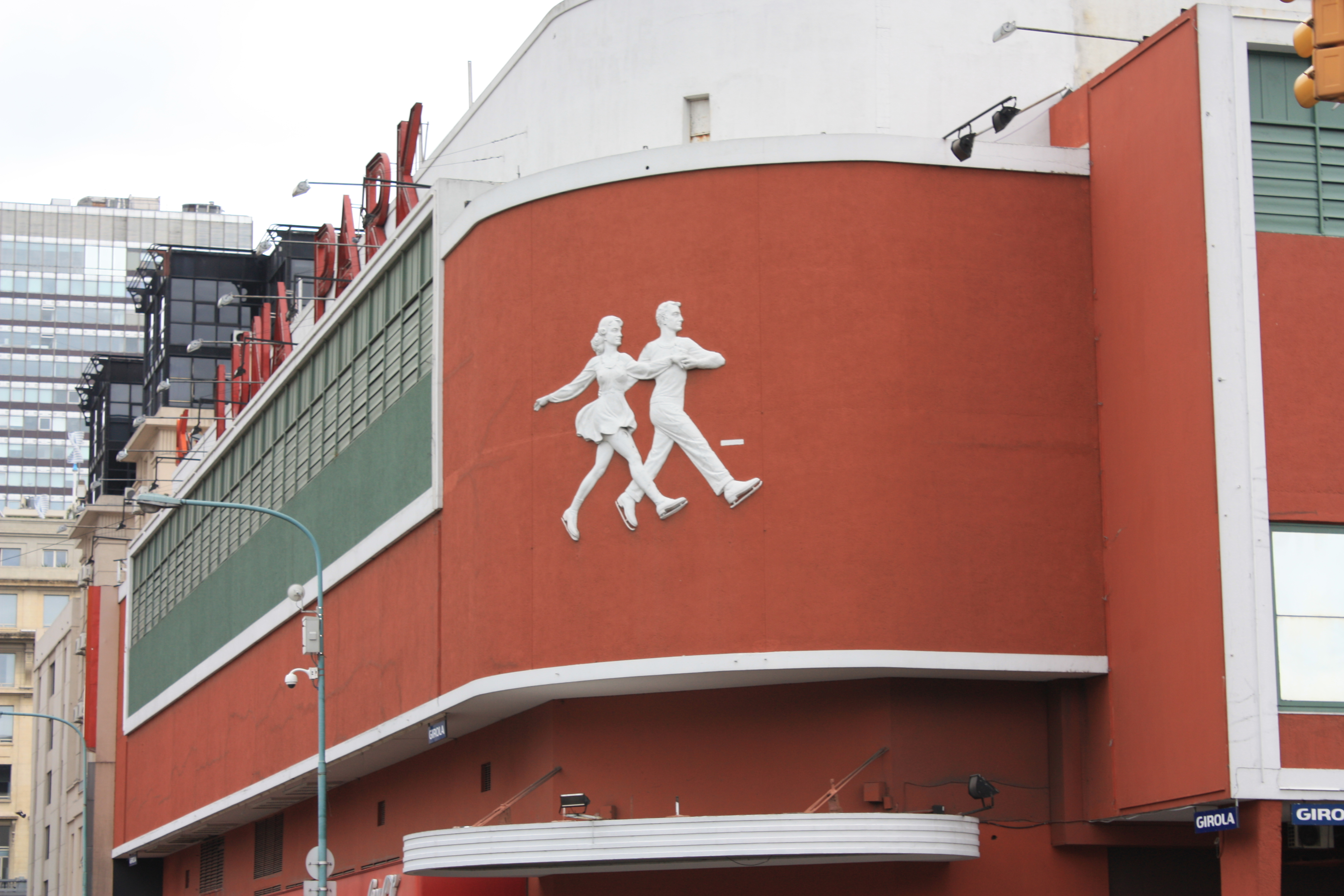

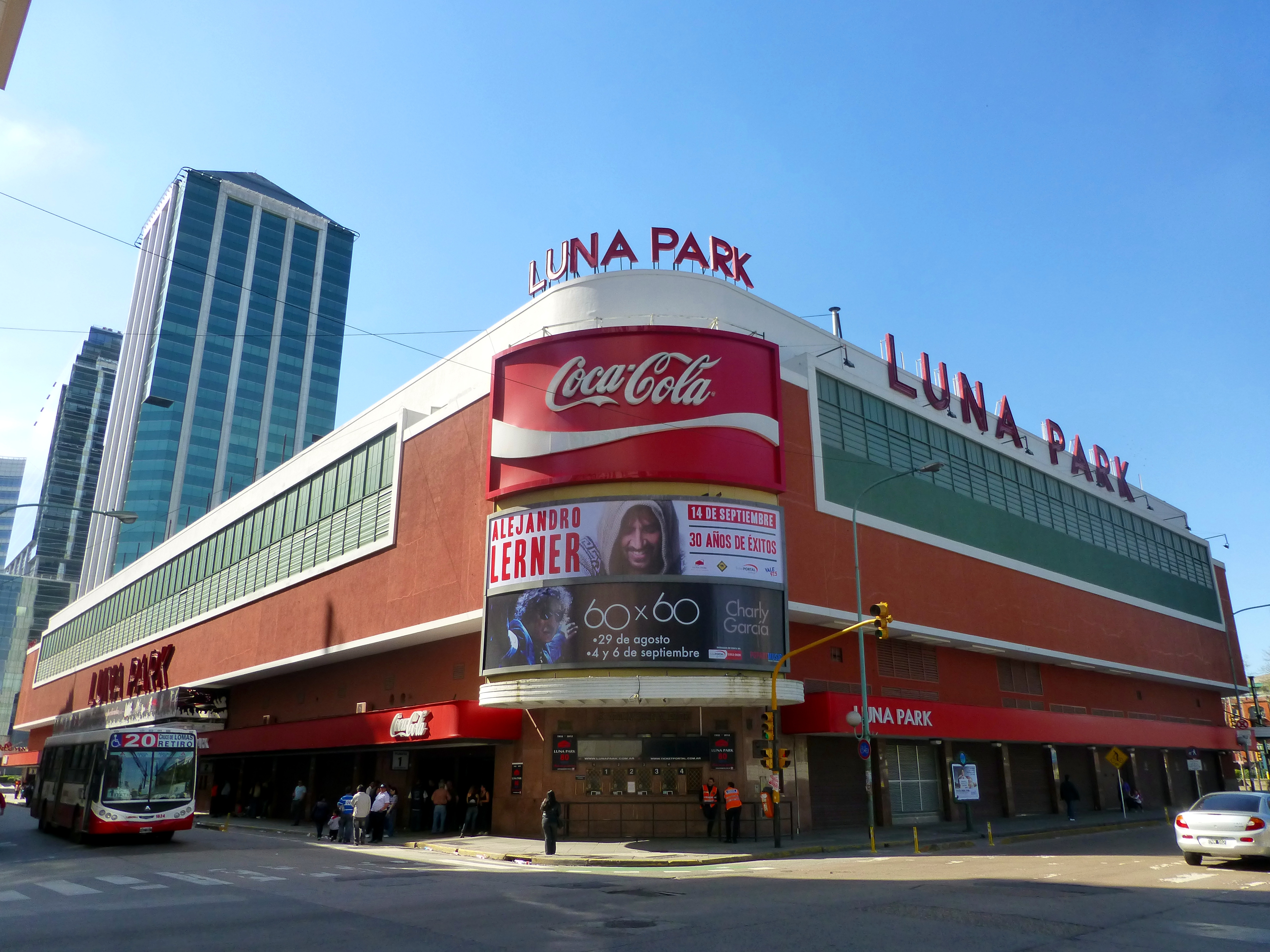

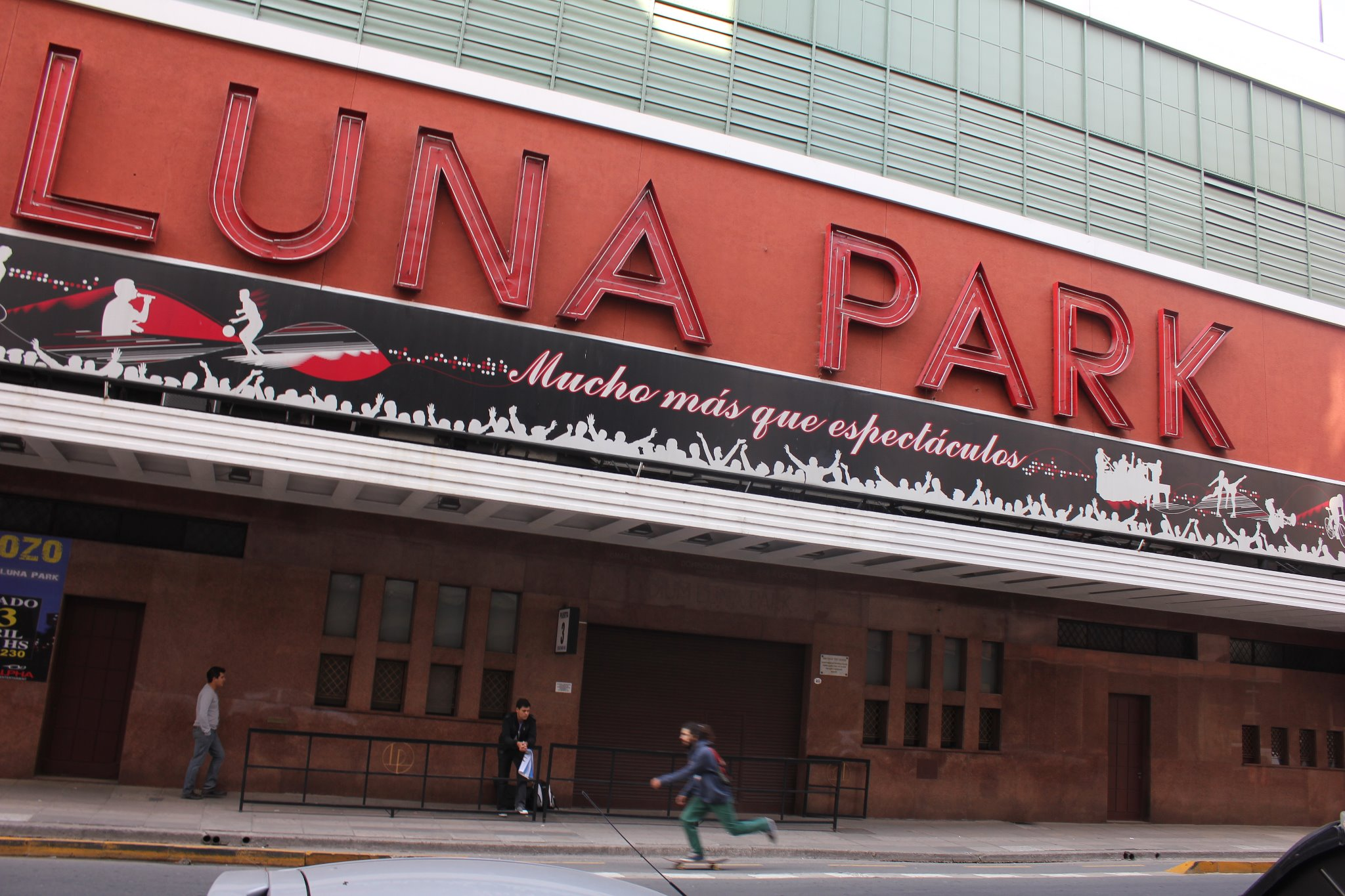

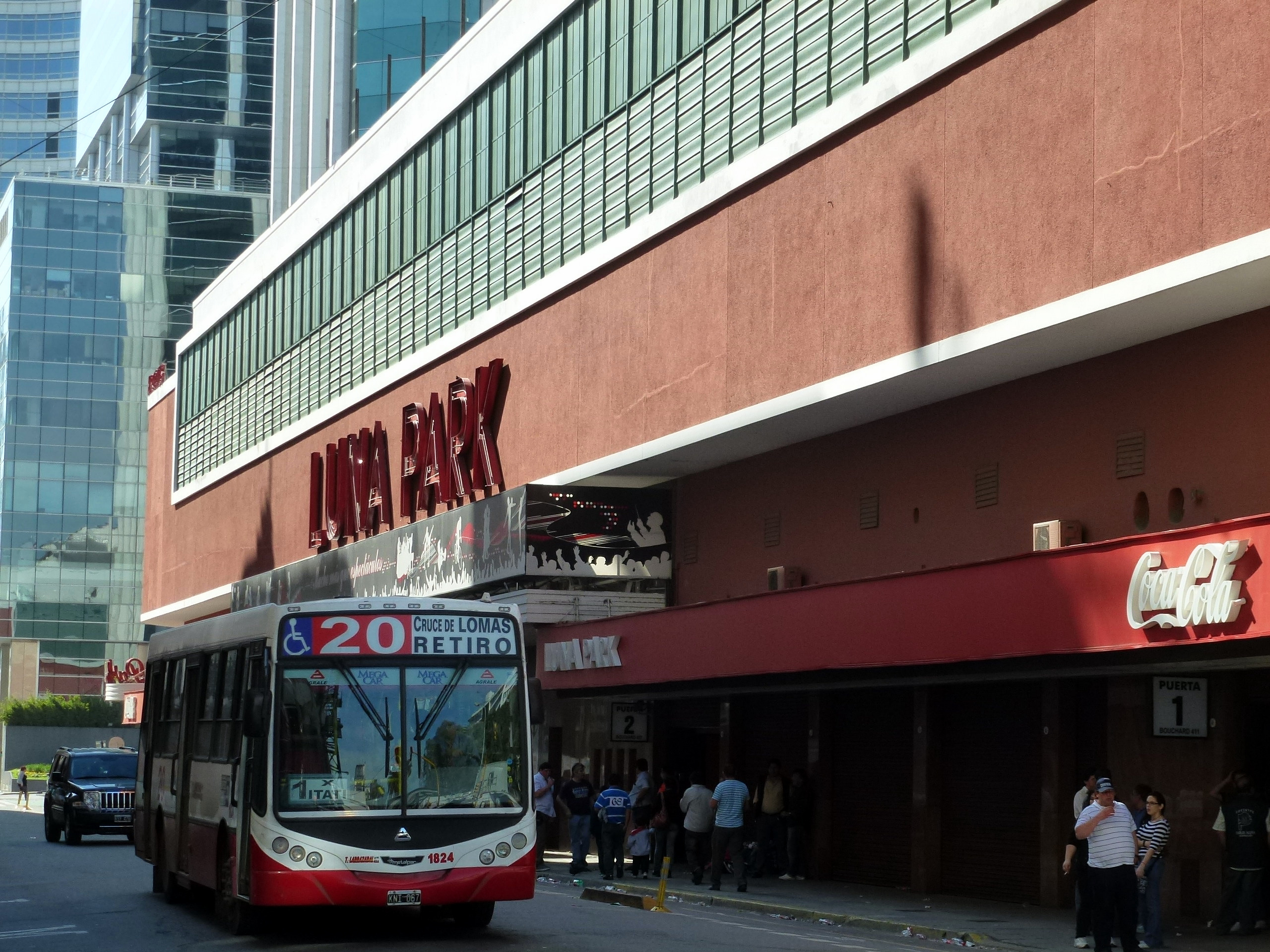

Events and tenants
Preceded by None	FIBA Basketball World Cup; Venue; 1950	Succeeded by Ginásio do Maracanãzinho; Rio de Janeiro
Preceded by None	Pan American Games Basketball Tournament; Venue; 1951	Succeeded by National Auditorium; Mexico City
Preceded by Palasport Pianella; Cucciago, Cantù	FIBA Intercontinental Cup; Final Venue; 1976	Succeeded by Pabellón de la Ciudad Deportiva; Madrid
Preceded by Palazzo dello Sport; Rome	FIVB Volleyball Men's World Championship; Final Venue; 1982	Succeeded by Palais Omnisports de Paris-Bercy; Paris
Preceded by Palacio de Deportes de la CAM; Madrid	FIBA Basketball World Cup; Final Venue; 1990	Succeeded by SkyDome; Toronto
Preceded by Yoyogi National Gymnasium; Tokyo	FIVB Volleyball Men's World Championship; Final Venue; 2002	Succeeded by Yoyogi National Gymnasium; Tokyo
Preceded by University Sports Hall; Wuppertal	Artistic Skating World Championship; Venue; 2003	Succeeded by Fresno Convention Center; Fresno
