= Raíces (Colomer) =

Raíces, música per a un aniversari (Catalan: Roots, music for an anniversary), often referred to as Raíces, is a composition for symphonic band by Valencian composer Juan J. Colomer. It was commissioned by the Alzira Musical Society and finished in November 1998. It was eventually premiered on December 21, 1998, performed by the Symphonic Band of the Alzira Musical Society and conducted by Ángel Crespo García, in his home town, Alzira.

== Structure ==
The pieces consists of three movements and takes approximately 23 minutes to perform. The movement list is as follows:

1. Sin compás – Moderato – Vivo
2. Adagio
3. Presto

The first section of the first movement is an unmeasured part in which Colomer tries to recreate the sounds remembered by himself when he was a student. It consists of extracts from different pieces and lessons for several instruments. The second and the third movement are to be played continuously.

== Instrumentation ==
Colomer wrote this composition for symphony wind orchestra. He specified the need for a large group of percussionist, as up to 10 percussionists are required to play this composition. The complete instrumentation is as follows.

- Piccolo
- Flute
- Oboe
- English horn
- Bassoon
- E♭ clarinet
- B♭ clarinet
- Bass clarinet
- Alto sax
- Tenor sax
- Baritone sax
- Horn
- Piccolo trumpet
- Trumpet
- Trombone
- Bass trombone
- Flugel
- Euphonium
- Tuba
- Cello
- Double bass
- Piano
- Percussion

Colomer also wrote an arrangement for six percussionists; it is rarely performed and there are no known recordings of it.

== In popular culture ==
- A part of the third movement of this composition was used for the final scene of the movie A Day Without a Mexican.
