= El Salmón =

Studio album by Andrés Calamaro
- Released: 2000
- Recorded: December 1999 – May 2000
- Genre: Rock
- Label: DRO Atlantic / Warner Music Argentina
- Producer: Andrés Calamaro

Andrés Calamaro chronology
Honestidad Brutal (1999)	El Salmón (2000)	El Cantante (2004)

El Salmón is a studio album by Andrés Calamaro.

== Track listing ==
=== Disc One ===
1. Out put - In put (El Cuino Scornik, Gringui Herrera, Andrés Calamaro) - 3:59
2. El Salmón (Scornik, Calamaro) - 2:46
3. Días distintos (Calamaro) - 3:30
4. Tuyo Siempre (Calamaro) - 3:13
5. OK Perdón (Calamaro) - 2:16
6. Horarios Esclavos (Calamaro) - 1:54
7. Nos Volveremos a Ver (Jorge Larrosa, Calamaro) - 2:00
8. Gaviotas (Calamaro) - 3:21
9. All You Need Is Pop (Calamaro) - 3:16
10. Cafetín de Buenos Aires (Discépolo, Mores) - 1:57
11. Enola Gay (Calamaro) - 4:34
12. Para Seguir (Calamaro) - 3:08
13. Revolución Turra (Calamaro) - 2:47
14. Rumbo Errado (Scornik, Calamaro) - 2:35
15. Mi Funeral 11 (Calamaro) - 4:36
16. Crucifícame (Calamaro) - 2:02
17. Vigilante Medio Argentino (Scornik, Calamaro) - 1:52
18. Me Fui Volando (Pappo Napolitano, Calamaro) - 1:29
19. Chicas (Calamaro) - 2:46
20. Tu Pavada (Scornik, Calamaro) - 4:28
21. Time Is On My Side (Meade) - 2:29
22. Revolucion Turra (Simón Salmón Remix) - 2:54

=== Disc Two ===
1. Todas Son Iguales (Calamaro)
2. Jugando Al Límite (Scornik, Calamaro)
3. Querrámonos (Calamaro)
4. Alfonsina y el mar (Luna, Ramírez)
5. El Mambo (Calamaro)
6. N.Q.T.Q.E. Llega (Calamaro)
7. La Diabla (Scornik, Calamaro)
8. Laura Va (Spinetta)
9. Porque Soy Así (Calamaro)
10. Barrio de Tango (Manzi, Troilo)
11. Que Ritmo Triste (Calamaro)
12. Mi Lobotomía (Calamaro)
13. No Sé Olvidar (Calamaro)
14. Nadie (Calamaro)
15. Lo Que No Existe Más (Calamaro)
16. El Camino Entero (Calamaro)
17. P.N.S.U.R.H.Q.S.U.R. (Recuerdo Reloco) (Calamaro)
18. Freaks (Scornik, Calamaro)
19. The Long And Winding Road (John Lennon, Paul McCartney)

=== Disc Three ===
1. El Viejo (Pappo Napolitano)
2. No Se Puede Vivir Del Amor (Calamaro)
3. Durazno Sangrando (Spinetta)
4. Revistas (Scornik, Calamaro)
5. Aguas Peligrosas (Calamaro)
6. Pálido Reflejo (Calamaro)
7. El Muro de Berlín (Scornik, Calamaro)
8. El Día D (Calamaro)
9. I Will (John Lennon, Paul McCartney)
10. Ojos Dos Ojos (Calamaro)
11. Río Manso (C. Aguirre)
12. Somos Feos (Calamaro)
13. Dejar de Vivir (Calamaro)
14. Chocolate (Calamaro)
15. Canalla (Calamaro)
16. Mi Autopista (Calamaro)
17. Reality Bomb (Scornik, Calamaro)
18. Blow-up (Calamaro)
19. Palabras Luminosas (Calamaro)
20. El Día Que Me Quieras (Carlos Gardel, Le Pera)

=== Disc Four ===
1. Empanadas de Vigilia (Scornik, Calamaro)
2. Steely Feeling (Calamaro, Ciro Fogliata)
3. All You Need Is Pop (Simón Salmón Remix)
4. 100% de Nada (Calamaro)
5. Expulsado del Paraíso (Calamaro)
6. You Won't See Me (John Lennon, Paul McCartney)
7. Séptimo Hijo Varón (Calamaro)
8. Under My Thumb (Mick Jagger, Keith Richards)
9. Lámeme el Orto (Calamaro)
10. Rumba del Perro (Chango, Calamaro)
11. No te Bancaste (Scornik, Calamaro)
12. Ciudadano Pesado (Calamaro)
13. Metálico Cha Cha (Calamaro)
14. No Woman, No Cry (Vincent Ford)
15. C.N.I.M.Q.U.C.D.P. (Calamaro)
16. Oh! Darling (John Lennon, Paul McCartney)
17. Un Barco Un Poco (Calamaro)
18. Lorena (Pappo Napolitano, Calamaro)
19. Presos de Nuestra Libertad (Calamaro)
20. Horizontes (Calamaro)

=== Disc Five ===
1. Problemas (Calamaro)
2. La Verdadera Libertad (Calamaro)
3. Los Ejes de mi Carreta (Yupanqui, Risso)
4. Un poco de Diente por Diente (Calamaro)
5. Culo sin Asiento (Calamaro)
6. Libros Sapiensales parte II (Soule, Quiroga, Godoy)
7. Ay! de Mí (Calamaro)
8. Malena (Manzi, Demare)
9. Adentro Mío (Calamaro)
10. Corta Pero Ancha (Calamaro)
11. Para los Demás (Calamaro)
12. Sexy Sadie (John Lennon, Paul McCartney)
13. Nuestra Piel (Calamaro)
14. Papa Say (Calamaro, Irorok, López)
15. Cocaine (J.J. Cale)
16. Varón, Dijo la Partera (Calamaro)
17. Paraísos Perdidos (Calamaro)
18. Así (Sandro, Anderle)
19. Me Cago en Todo (Calamaro, Badreddine)
20. Valentina (Calamaro)
21. H.M.Q.D.E.P. (Calamaro)
22. Este es el Final de mi Carrera (Calamaro)
