= Raíces (band) =

1977 Argentine rock band

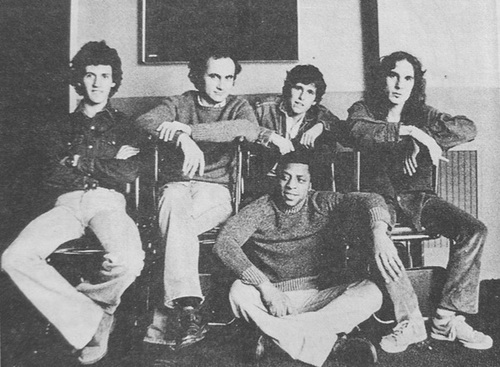
Raúl Cuadro, Alberto Bengolea, Andrés Calamaro, Beto Satragni and Jimmy Santos in 1980

Raíces were an Argentine rock band founded in 1977 by Roberto Valencia, who played keyboards and percussion. After Valencia departed to Europe, he was replaced by Andrés Calamaro. Osvaldo Cuenze replaced Jimmy Santos on percussion and was a member of the band from 1980 to 1982, before moving to the United States to pursue further music studies at CalArts and UCLA. The band dissolved with the death of Beto Satragni in 2010. Valencia together with Satragni were the main composers of the band.

== Discography ==
- B.O.V. Dombe (1978)
- Los habitantes de la rutina (1980)
- Raíces 30 años (with Andrés Calamaro; 2008)
