= Miguel Abuelo =

Argentine rock musician and singer

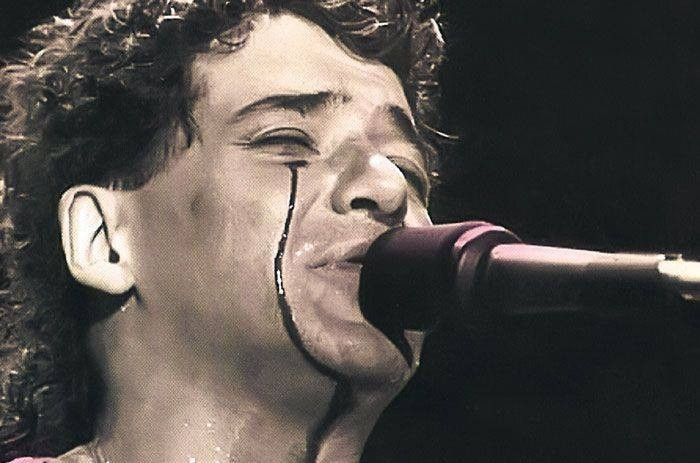
- Born: March 21, 1946; Munro, Argentina
- Died: March 26, 1988 (aged 42); Munro, Argentina

Miguel Angel Peralta (March 21, 1946 – March 26, 1988), known by his artistic name Miguel Abuelo, was an Argentine rock musician and singer.

== Early days ==
A native of Munro, in the Greater Buenos Aires industrial belt, Miguel Peralta was one of the young rockers that grew out of the Norte hotel, the Perla del Once café and the La Cueva night club in Buenos Aires in the late 1960s. Abuelo did not play in La Cueva but was friendly with many who did. At some point, he and fellow poetry buff Pipo Lernoud were approached by Ben Molar, a recording executive of Mandioca (the only label in Argentina dedicated to record Spanish language rock). On the spur of the moment, Peralta claimed that he had a band called Los Abuelos de la Nada (the Grandparents of Nothingness) which was ready to enter the studio. The name was taken from a passage in a book by Leopoldo Marechal.

As Molar did not call his bluff, Peralta actually assembled a band, featuring Claudio Gabis on guitar, Alberto Lara on bass, Héctor "Pomo" Lorenzo on drums, and Eduardo "Mayoneso" on keyboards. Their first single, Diana Divaga (Diana wanders), featured psychedelic influences. About this time, Miguel started using Abuelo as his artistic surname.

Gabis was reluctant to commit to the band, so Abuelo drafted promising young guitarist Norberto Napolitano, better known as Pappo. After some time, the band's materials started drifting towards blues, and Abuelo agreed to quit and let Pappo take over. Eventually, the band mutated into Pappo's Blues, while Gabis found his place in Manal, another blues band.

After a brief period of drifting and fighting amphetamine-induced depression, in 1970 Miguel joined Pomo, Carlos Cutaia on keyboards, and Luis Alberto Spinetta on guitar, in a band called El Huevo (The Egg). After a few rehearsals, Abuelo left. Later, with David Lebon in his place, the band would achieve fame as Pescado Rabioso.

Wishing to escape what he perceived as an oppressive environment, Abuelo followed Lernoud's advice and took off to Barcelona in 1971.

== European years ==
For ten years, Abuelo did odd jobs as a migrant farm hand, selling handmade purses, and playing music. He assembled and dissolved bands in France (with Daniel Sbarra and other expatriate musicians). He release in Paris his first lp called "Miguel Abuelo" with the record label of Moshé Naïm "Emen". This album was also released in cd in 1995. This album is the most interesting one, very rock as Led Zeppelin. He was also in Ibiza (with Argentine musicians Kubero Díaz and Miguel Cantilo). He also found time to write a poetry book, marry dancer Kristina "Krisha" Bogdan in England, and father his only son, Gato. After the Ibiza band dissolved, he did time in a prison in Calallonga (near Barcelona) for carrying counterfeit residence papers.

In 1979 Abuelo met Argentine colleague Guillermo Carlos Cazenave in Sitges (Barcelona) and started to record many songs that "Guill" produced in his 4 channel Portastudio, that was also used for the re-union of the Abuelos three years later on in Buenos Aires. Miguel used to stay living at Guillermo's house near the beach, in which they both jammed and sang together many new and old songs, one of them, Verilí, included in Cazenave's album of duets Duplex (2002).

In Ibiza, Abuelo had met bass player Cachorro López, who was a popular session musician with reggae and funk bands. López insisted that Abuelo should return to Argentina to re-create the Abuelos, and that he (López) would be their bassist and producer. Common friend Techi Aldao arranged for the travel expenses, and Abuelo returned to Argentina in 1981 and started looking for musicians.

== The second Abuelos era ==
With Cachorro on the bass, the band was assembled: teenage phenom Andrés Calamaro (voice and keyboards), Gustavo Bazterrica (guitar), Daniel Melingo (sax), and Polo Corbella (drums). After playing some "underground" dates (Melingo was especially active on that circuit), their first songs started receiving radio play.

The 1982 Falklands War (Spanish: Guerra de las Malvinas/Guerra del Atlántico Sur) was a catalyst for Argentine rock, as songs with English-language lyrics were not broadcast for several months. Abuelo and his band wrote materials favored by radio DJs, including No te enamores nunca de aquel marinero bengalí (Never fall in love with that Bengali sailor) which grew out of improvisation during rehearsals, and Sin gamulán (Without a coat), written by Calamaro.

Charly García took the band under his wing after dissolving Serú Girán, and the Abuelos played in García's 1982 Christmas concert. García also drafted López, Melingo and Calamaro for his band, in parallel with their work for the Abuelos.

The 1983 debut album included many compositions by Abuelo-López, and a reggae hit by Calamaro's former partner Gringui Herrera, Tristezas de la ciudad (City blues).

For their 1983 album, Vasos y Besos (Glasses and Kisses), Melingo wrote his own reggae hit: Chala-man, Bazterrica contributed No se desesperen (Don't despair), and Calamaro chimed in with Mil horas (A thousand hours).

The band became popular with rockers and more pop-oriented audiences. Especially, Calamaro was favored by teenage girls looking for an "edgier" idol than balladeer Alejandro Lerner. The album sold a solid 160,000 records, and was presented in a six-month country-wide tour.

Record executives arranged to send the band to Ibiza for the recording of their 1984 album, Himno de mi Corazón (Hymn of my heart). Buoyed by reviving some of his good Ibiza memories and by a new love interest, Abuelo was in unusually good spirits throughout the sessions. The album became a sales hit as expected. Later that year, Melingo, who was also working with García and another band (Los Twist), called it quits and was replaced by Alfredo Desiata.

By early 1985, the band's spirits were damaged due to Bazterrica's antics (he had become addicted to cocaine, and was separated from the band after missing several dates), and to the rivalry between Abuelo and Calamaro for top billing.

About that time, Calamaro wrote what would be his last mega-hit with the band: Costumbres argentinas (Argentine habits). Sensing that the band was on the verge of dissolution, Calamaro and López persuaded Abuelo to record a live album in their last major concert, in the Opera theater in Buenos Aires in May 1985. For the occasion, Gringui Herrera replaced Bazterrica, Juan del Barrio reinforced Calamaro in keyboards, and Melingo played some songs as a guest musician.

The band played one more gig in October 1985, in the José Amalfitani Stadium, to fulfill their contractual obligation to the "Rock and Pop" festival which featured INXS. The crowd reacted badly to the band's evident lack of motivation (the pouring rain and the badly mixed sound did not help), and Abuelo was hit in the face by a bottle hurled from the field. The band played the remainder of their set with Abuelo visibly bleeding.

Also during 1985, Abuelo put out a solo album recorded together with many of his older and newer friends. The album included new versions of La Cueva-era classics "La balsa" (The raft) and Mariposas de madera (Wooden butterflies), and a Hoelderlin-influenced song, Buen día día (Good day, day).

== Third Abuelos era and last days ==
With the band dissolved, Abuelo started playing small venues, harking back to his roots of poetry-influenced songwriting. Late in 1986, he drafted Polo Corbella, Kubero Díaz, and sax player Willy Crook to form a new Abuelos band, which recorded Cosas mías in 1987 with relative success.

In late 1987, following gallbladder surgery, Miguel Abuelo was diagnosed with AIDS; terminally ill, he died from cardiac arrest a few days after his 42nd birthday.

== Legacy ==
Near his death, Abuelo told friends: No me lloren, crezcan. (don't cry for me; grow instead).

Abuelo's death came a little after Luca Prodan's and shortly before Federico Moura's. They were three of the leaders of the Argentine youth music scene during the 1980s.

The 1980s band is still fondly remembered by fans all over Latin America. It has sold more records since its dissolution than during its successful four-year trajectory.

Calamaro went on to become one of the best-selling artists in the Spanish-speaking world, notably with Spanish-Argentine band Los Rodríguez. Melingo remained active in the underground scene, and has lately participated in tango-influenced projects with much success. Corbella worked in odd jobs and did time for selling drugs; he died in 2001 from stomach cancer. Bazterrica quit the rock and roll life after a drugs trial in 1986, and was seen sporadically, playing mostly small venues with his Bazterrícolas.

Cachorro López was active as a session musician and producer; during the 1990s, he put out remastered editions and unreleased tapes of the band. López won a Latin Grammy in 2006 as "Producer of the Year" for the records "Días felices" by Cristian Castro, "Diego" by Diego, "Dulce Beat" by Belanova, "Limón y sal" by Julieta Venegas, and Vanessa Colaiutta's eponymous album .

Miguel's son Gato played with Calamaro, Bazterrica and Corbella in a 1997 re-union. The rights to the Abuelos de la Nada name were offered by Krisha Bogdan to Kubero Díaz, who refused out of respect. At some point during 2001, it was reported that Bogdan and Gato were fighting in court over the rights to the name and to Miguel Abuelo's unpublished recordings.
