= Leopoldo Marechal =

Argentine writer (1900–1970)

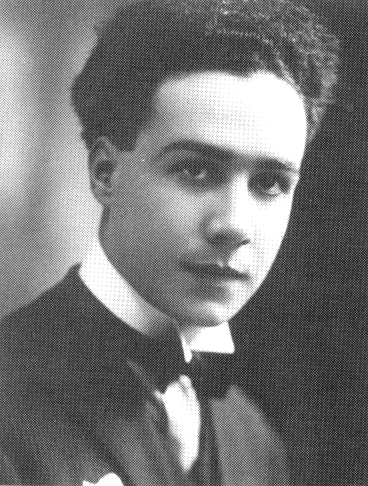
Leopoldo Marechal

Leopoldo Marechal (June 11, 1900 – June 26, 1970) was one of the most important Argentine writers of the twentieth century.

== Biographical notes ==
Born in Buenos Aires into a family of French and Basque descent, Marechal became a primary school teacher and a high school professor after obtaining his degree despite enormous economic difficulties. During the 1920s he was among the poets who rallied around the movement represented by the literary journal Martín Fierro. While his first published works of poetry, Los aguiluchos (1922) and Días como flechas (1926), tended towards vanguardism, his Odas para el hombre y la mujer showed a blend of novelty and a more classical style. It is with this collection of poems that Marechal obtained his first official recognition as a poet in 1929, the Premio Municipal de Poesía of the city of Buenos Aires.

He traveled to Europe for the first time in 1926 and in Paris met important intellectuals and artists such as Picasso, Basaldúa and Antonio Berni. On his second visit to Paris in 1929, he settled in Montparnasse and widened his circle of friends, which now included artists Aquiles Badi, Alfredo Bigatti, Horacio Butler, Juan del Prete, Raquel Forner, Victor Pissarro and the sculptor José Fioravanti, who later sculpted the poet's bust in bronze. It is during this second Parisian experience that Marechal wrote the first two chapters of his novel Adam Buenosayres, which he did not publish until 1948. Some of its protagonists are based on his friends of the Martin Fierro group, including artist Xul Solar (as the astrologer Schultze), poet Jacobo Fijman (as the philosopher Samuel Tesler), Jorge Luis Borges (as Luis Pereda) and Raúl Scalabrini Ortiz (as "el petiso" Bernini).

Back in Buenos Aires, Marechal married María Zoraida Barreiro in 1934. Their two daughters, María de los Ángeles and María Magdalena, were born some years after. Marechal again obtained the First Prize of the prestigious Premio Municipal de Poesía in 1940 for his poetry book entitled Sonetos a Sophia. The poet's wife died in 1947, leaving him with two small children.

The publication of the writer's Adam Buenosayres, considered by many as the fundamental novel of Argentine literature, did not have the expected repercussion, possibly due to the poet's open sympathies for the government of Juan Domingo Perón, the controversial populist leader greatly influenced by his radical wife Evita. Among the novel's most ardent admirers was Julio Cortázar, who wrote a long critical study in the literary magazine Realidad in 1949. Despite his and other writers' support, Marechal's novel and the rest of his monumental work remained widely ignored by many colleagues of the literary world, including Jorge Luis Borges, whose mother and sister had been imprisoned during Peron´s presidency.

Although the seminal influence of his first and subsequent novels has tended to classify him mainly as a novelist, Marechal is first and foremost a poet of primary importance. In fact, even his first novel, which is mainly autobiographical, is in his own words an extension of poetry: "When I wrote Adán Buenosayres I never intended it to be other than poetry. Ever since my early youth, and taking Aristotle's Poetics as my starting point, I have always believed that all literary genres are and should be types of poetry, whether epic, dramatic or lyrical."

Marechal was not a widely recognized figure in Argentine literature until the 1965 reprint of Adam Buenosayres, which ignited a resurgence of interest in his work. His seminal novel has been translated into French by Patrice Toulat (Paris Grasset, Unesco 1995), into Italian by Nicola Jacchia (Vallecchi, Firenze 2010), and into English by Norman Cheadle and Sheila Ethier (McGill-Queen's University Press 2014). His second novel El banquete de Severo Arcángelo was also published in 1965.

The poet was officially invited to Cuba in 1967, where he formed part of the international jury for the annual Casa de las Américas prize for literature. Marechal has since become a fundamental influence in Argentine poetry and fiction, although he continues to be a relatively unknown figure on the international scene. Among his more well known literary disciples and friends are Argentine poets Rafael Squirru and Fernando Demaría, to whom he dedicated his Heptamerón's Poética and Alegropeya, respectively. Marechal's daughters have established a foundation (see External links) for the diffusion of their father's work.

== Work ==
=== Poetry ===
- Los Aguiluchos (1922)
- Días Como Flechas (1926)
- Odas para el hombre y la mujer (1929)
- Laberinto de amor (1936)
- Cinco poemas australes (1937)
- El centauro (1940)
- Sonetos a Sophía (1940)
- Canto de San Martín o Cantata Sanmartiniana (1950)
- Heptamerón (1966)
- El poema de Robot (1966)
- Poema de la Física (posthumous publication)

=== Novels ===
- Adam Buenosayres (Adán Buenosayres) (1948)
- El banquete de Severo Arcángelo (1965)
- Megafón, o, La guerra (1970)

=== Short stories ===
- El rey Vinagre (1926)
- El niño dios (1939)
- Narración con espía obligado (1966)
- El hipogrifo (1968)
- El beatle final (1968)
- Autobiografía de Sátiro (1971)

=== Plays ===
- Antígona Vélez (1951)
- Las tres caras de Venus (1952)
- La batalla de José Luna (1967)
- Don Juan (1978)
- Alijerandro (2012)
- Polifemo (2016)

=== Essays ===
- Historia de la calle Corrientes, (1937)
- Descenso y ascenso del alma por la belleza, (1939)
- Vida de Santa Rosa de Lima, (1943)
- Cuaderno de navegación, (1966)

=== Translated novels ===
- Adán Buenosayres (Paris Grasset, Unesco 1995, French translation by Patrice Toulat)
- Adán Buenosayres (Vallecchi, Firenze 2010, editor Claudio Ongaro Haelterman, Italian translation by Nicola Jacchia)
- Adán Buenosayres (English translation by Norman Cheadle, published by McGill-Queen's University Press, 2014)

== Works about Leopoldo Marechal ==
- Rafael Squirru, Leopoldo Marechal, Buenos Aires, Ediciones Culturales Argentinas, 1961.
- Coulson, Graciela, Marechal, la pasión metafísica, Ediciones García Cambeiro, Buenos Aires, 1973, 190 p.
- de Navascués, Javier, Adán Buenosayres: una novela total. Estudio narratológico, Pamplona, EUNSA (Universidad de Navarra), 1992, 296 p.
- Kröpfl Ulrike, Leopoldo Marechal oder die Rückkehr der Geschichte, Vervuert Verlag. Frankfurt am Main, 1995, 409 p.
- Kröpfl, Ulrike, Cahiers d´Histoire des Littératures Romanes Romanistische Zeitschrift für Literaturgeschichte, Universitätsverlag C. Winter Heidelberg, 21. Jahrgang, 1997, Sonderdruck, pp. 393–415.
- Cheadle, Norman, The Ironic Apocalypse in the Novels of Leopoldo Marechal, Colección Támesis. Serie A, Monografías 183. Londres: Támesis Books, 2000.
- Podeur, Jean-François, Don Juan, de Leopoldo Marechal: du Mythe à l´allégorie du salut, Theatres du Monde, Université d´Avignon, Institut de Recherches Internationales sur les Arts du Spectacle, Faculté des Lettres et des Sciences Humaines, Cahier Nº 3, 1993.
- Lojo de Beuter, María Rosa, La mujer simbólica en la narrativa de Leopoldo Marechal, Ensayos de crítica literaria. Año 1983. Buenos Aires: Editorial de Belgrano, 1983.
- Cavallari, Héctor Mario, "Leopoldo Marechal: El espacio de los signos", Xalapa, México: Universidad Veracruzana, 1981.

== Sources ==
- Gordon, Ambrose. "Marechal, Leopoldo." In Encyclopedia of World Literature in the 20th Century Revised Edition, ed. Leonard S. Klein (New York: Frederick Ungar Publishing Co., 1983)
