= Adam Buenosayres =

1948 novel by Leopoldo Marechal

- First edition
- Author: Leopoldo Marechal
- Original title: Adán Buenosayres
- Translator: Norman Cheadle; Sheila Ethier
- Language: Spanish
- Publisher: Editorial Sudamericana
- Publication date: 1948
- Publication place: Argentina
- English publication date: April 2014
- Pages: 739

Adam Buenosayres (Spanish: Adán Buenosayres) is a 1948 novel by the Argentine writer Leopoldo Marechal. The story takes place in Buenos Aires in the 1920s, and follows a vanguard writer who goes through a metaphysical struggle during three days. The book is a humorous account of the Martinfierristas movement, which was prominent in Argentine literature in the 1920s.

Julio Cortázar hailed the novel as a major literary event, but otherwise it received limited attention upon the immediate publication. Pedro Orgambide has suggested that this might have been due to Marechal's support for Juan Perón, which was controversial at the time. It has since gained status as one of Argentina's most prominent novels. The English translation by Norman Cheadle and Sheila Ethier was longlisted for the 2015 Best Translated Book Award.
