= Daniel Melingo =

Argentine musician (1957–2026)

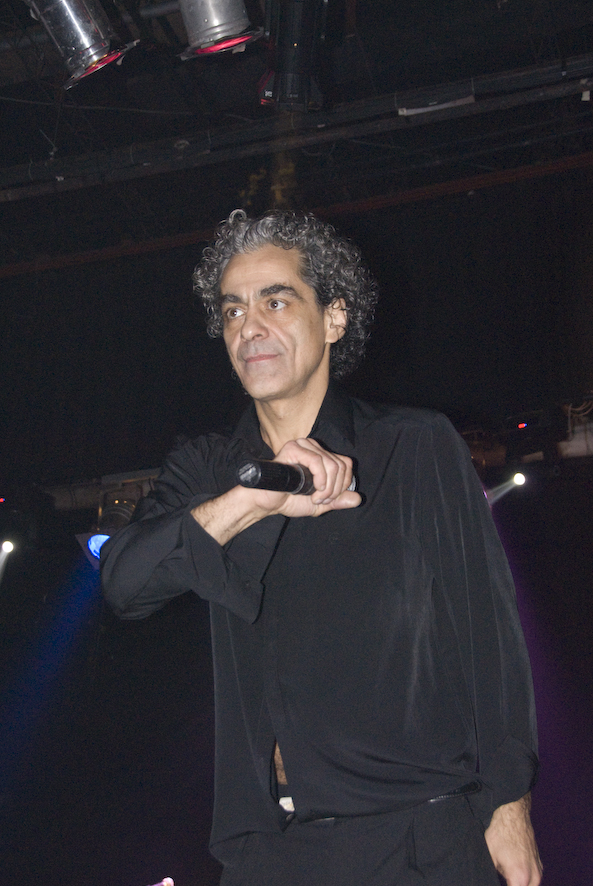
Daniel Melingo

Daniel Melingo (October 22, 1957 – June 30, 2026) was an Argentine musician, with a background in rock (he played guitar for Los Twist and saxophone for Los Abuelos de la Nada). He later became a tango artist and toured with his band Los Ramones del Tango.

== Life and career ==
Melingo was exposed to music since his childhood days, as his stepfather was Edmundo Rivero's manager. After playing for some time with Brazilian singer Milton Nascimento, Melingo was active in the Buenos Aires independent theater scene in the early 1980s, under the military dictatorship. When the restrictions on cultural activities eased after the Falklands War, Melingo became a notable participant in projects such as a rock opera version of "Dr. Moreau's Trials", masterminded by Victor Kesselman, and Los Twist. He was called by Cachorro López to play the saxophone in the Abuelos de la Nada reunion, where he was, according to colleague Andrés Calamaro, the person who established the band's musical direction.

After the Abuelos and Twist, Melingo spent time in Spain, where he formed a band named Lions in Love. Back in Argentina, he issued a disc based on the mythical Argentine graphic novel El Eternauta, and later on turned to tango singer. He issued several recordings to critical acclaim, toured the world, and was hailed by the British press as "the man who's making tango seriously cool"

Melingo died on June 30, 2026, at the age of 68.

== Discography ==
- H2O, 1995
- Tangos Bajos, 1998
- Ufa!, 1999
- Santa Milonga, 2004
- Maldito Tango, 2007
- Corazón & Hueso, 2011
- Linyera, 2014
- Anda, 2016

With David Murray

- Plays Nat King Cole en Español (Motema, 2011)

== Awards ==
- Premios Gardel 2009 : Best male artist tango album with Maldito Tango
- Latin Grammy 2009 : Nominated for best tango album with Maldito Tango

== Guest appearances ==
- Vocals and clarinet on "Tu Misterio" (track #7 on the album Tango 3.0 by Gotan Project)
