= Andrés Calamaro =

Argentine musician and composer

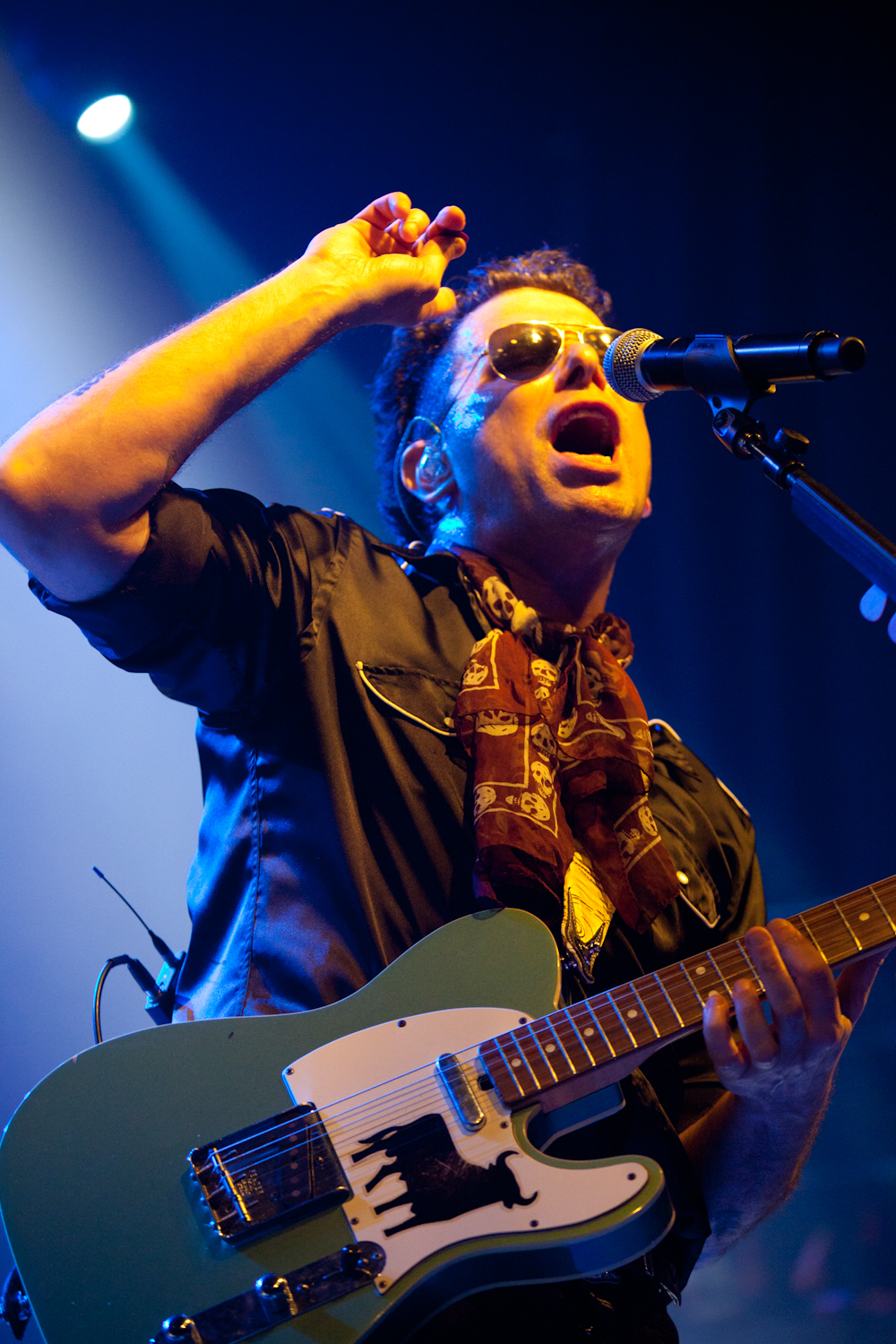
- Calamaro performing in 2010

Background information
- Born: Andres Calamaro; August 22, 1961 (age 64); Buenos Aires, Argentina
- Genres: Rock and roll; Latin rock; alternative rock; pop rock; funk; ska; reggae; tango; new wave
- Occupations: Musician; songwriter; producer
- Instruments: Piano; guitar; bass guitar; drums; synthesizer; bandoneon; flute; violin; double bass; arpa; vocals
- Website: www.calamaro.com

Andrés Calamaro (August 22, 1961) is an Argentine musician, composer and Latin Grammy winner. He is considered one of the greatest and most influential rock artists in Spanish. He is also one of the most complete artists for his wide range of musical styles, including funk, reggae, ballads, boleros, tangos and jazz. His former band Los Rodríguez was a major success in Spain and throughout Latin America mainly during the 1990s. He is multi-instrumentalist and became one of the main icons of Argentine rock, selling over 1.3 million records to date.

== Life and career ==
=== Abuelos de la Nada ===
Andres Calamaro was born in Buenos Aires. At 17 years of age he participated as a guest in the recording of an album of the group Raíces, and shortly after he started his own band, the Elmer Band, with guitarist friend Gringui Herrera. This band had an underground hit, "Tristeza de la Ciudad" (City Blues).

When Miguel Abuelo, leader of Los Abuelos de la Nada, returned to Argentina, he reunited the band and invited Calamaro to play keyboards. The band was a big success; Calamaro wrote some of their greatest hits, such as "Sin gamulán", "Mil horas" and "Costumbres argentinas".

=== First solo period ===
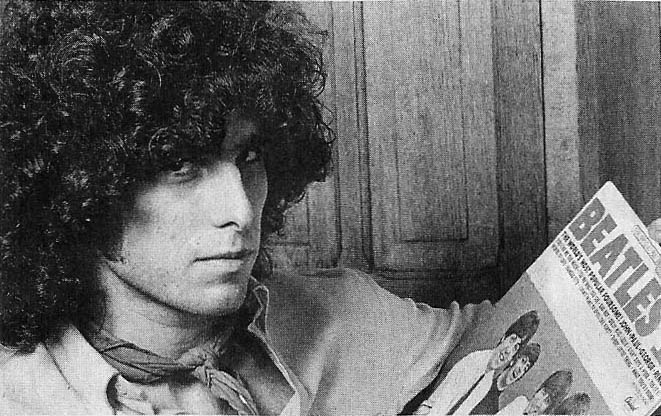
Calamaro c. 1984

Before the dissolution of Los Abuelos de la Nada, Calamaro released his first solo album, Hotel Calamaro, in 1984. A second album, Vida Cruel, recorded shortly after his separation from the band, was received warmly by the press but did not achieve commercial success.

After a third album, Por Mirarte (1988), Calamaro started producing for bands such as Los Fabulosos Cadillacs and Los Enanitos Verdes, and soloists such as Fabiana Cantilo. Calamaro closed the 1980s with his own band, featuring old friends Gringui Herrera and Ariel Rot, who recently came back from Spain. The trio recorded the album Nadie sale vivo de aquí (No One Gets Out of Here Alive) in 1989 with a number of guest musicians, which obtained the nomination of Best Record of the Year.

In 1990, Calamaro worked as a producer on Sandra Mihanovich and Celeste Carballo's album Mujer contra mujer.

=== Los Rodríguez ===
Due to the economic situation in Argentina, Calamaro and Rot settled in Spain, where they created the band Los Rodríguez with Julián Infante and Germán Villela on drums. The band didn't have a bass player, but Guillermo Martin, Candi Avello, and later Daniel Zamora accompanied the band in recordings and tours.

Los Rodríguez released three successful studio albums: Buena Suerte (1991), Sin documentos (1993) and Palabras más, palabras menos (1995), as well as the live Disco Pirata (1992), and the compilation Hasta luego (1996). Sin documentos gave them international acclaim, with its mixture of rock, flamenco and Latin American rhythms. They toured Spain and Latin America, and entered the history of Rock in Spanish.

=== Solo ===
Andrés Calamaro released Grabaciones Encontradas ("Found recordings", which in Spanish could also be understood as "Conflicting recordings") while working with Los Rodríguez. After Palabras más, palabras menos, the band released a greatest-hits album, which sold nicely, and then dissolved.

In 1996, Calamaro performed "Cosas Que Me Ayudan A Olvidar (Things That Help Me To Forget)" for the AIDS benefit album Silencio=Muerte: Red Hot + Latin produced by the Red Hot Organization. In 1997 Calamaro recorded Alta suciedad (literally "High filth," but also a pun "High society"/"Alta sociedad"), which sold over half a million copies and took him again touring around Latin America.

Calamaro began composing song after song. In six months, he had over 100 songs ready to be released. Thirty-seven of these found their way to his next album, Honestidad brutal. The album included hits such as "Te quiero igual", "Paloma", "Los aviones", "Cuando te conocí" and "La parte de adelante". This double CD was created after the breakup with his girlfriend, which is reflected in the songs. The album also contains a collaboration with Diego Maradona.

In 2000, he recorded 103 songs in his five-CD album El Salmón.

=== Free music ===
In the following years, Calamaro made many guest appearances in concerts and recordings. He posted unpublished songs from 2001 to 2002 for free download over the Internet, saying that "Music belongs to those who want to hear it; and to nobody else".

He also made his home recordings available online. Due to the low quality of the recordings, and with permission of the author Camisetas Para Todos, a group of fans, re-mastered Calamaro's songs and made them available on their site. He also started Radio Salmón Vaticano, a virtual recording studio at his web site.

In 2004 he released El Cantante (The Singer), an album with covers of tangos and other Latin American rhythms, and a few of his web-released songs.

=== The Return ===
In 2005 he released El Regreso (The Return), a compilation of the live recordings from his appearance in the Luna Park Stadium earlier that year. The disc was presented on December 17 to an audience of 20,000 in the Obras Sanitarias Stadium, and was awarded with the 2006 Gardel Awards for Rock Album by Male Artist and Best Album Cover. Calamaro was awarded the Golden Gardel (main award).

After that, he released Tinta Roja, a collection of classic tangos such as "El día que me quieras", "Como dos extraños" and "Sur". On November 20, 2006 was released El Palacio de las Flores, recorded with Litto Nebbia and on September 11, 2007, La Lengua Popular was released. In 2008 Raíces 30 Años followed with the band Raíces, and in 2009 Andrés, a solo anthology of 6 CDs.

In June 2010 he released his album On The Rock, which returned to his more rock-oriented sound. The album became an instant hit, as well as the first single, "Los Divinos", a song about the passing of time.

== Discography ==
=== Los Abuelos de la Nada ===
- Los Abuelos de la Nada [The Grandparents of Nothingness] (1982)
- Vasos y Besos [Glasses and Kisses] (1983)
- Himno de mi Corazón [The Hymn of My Heart] (1984)
- En Directo desde el Ópera [Live Album] (1985)

=== Los Rodríguez ===
- Buena Suerte (1991)
- Disco Pirata (1992)
- Sin Documentos (1993)
- Palabras más, Palabras menos (1995)
- Hasta Luego (1997)
- Hasta Luego (Collector CD/book) (2001)
- Para no olvidar (2001)

=== Solo ===
- Hotel Calamaro (1984)
- Vida Cruel (1985)
- Por Mirarte (1988)
- Nadie sale vivo de aquí (1989)
- Grabaciones Encontradas Vol. I (1993)
- Loco por Tí - Live in Ayacucho '88 (1994)
- Caballos Salvajes (1995)
- Grabaciones Encontradas Vol. II (1996)
- Alta Suciedad (1997)
- Las otras caras de Alta Suciedad (1998)
- Una Década Perdida (1998)
- Honestidad Brutal (1999)
- Alta Suciedad (Collector Series) (1999)
- El Salmón (2000)
- Duetos (2001)
- El Cantante (2004)
- El Regreso (2005)
- Tinta Roja (2006)
- Made in Argentina (DVD) (2006)
- El Palacio de las Flores (2006)
- La Lengua Popular (2007)
- Dos son Multitud (collaboration with Fito & Fitipaldis) (2008)
- Nada se Pierde (released by EFE EME magazine, with previous unpublished songs) (2009)
- On the Rock (2010)
- Bohemio (2013)
- Hijos del Pueblo (collaboration with Enrique Bunbury) (2015)
- Volumen 11 (2016)
- Cargar la Suerte (2018)
- Dios los Cría (2021)
