= Juana Molina =

Argentine musician and actress (born 1961)

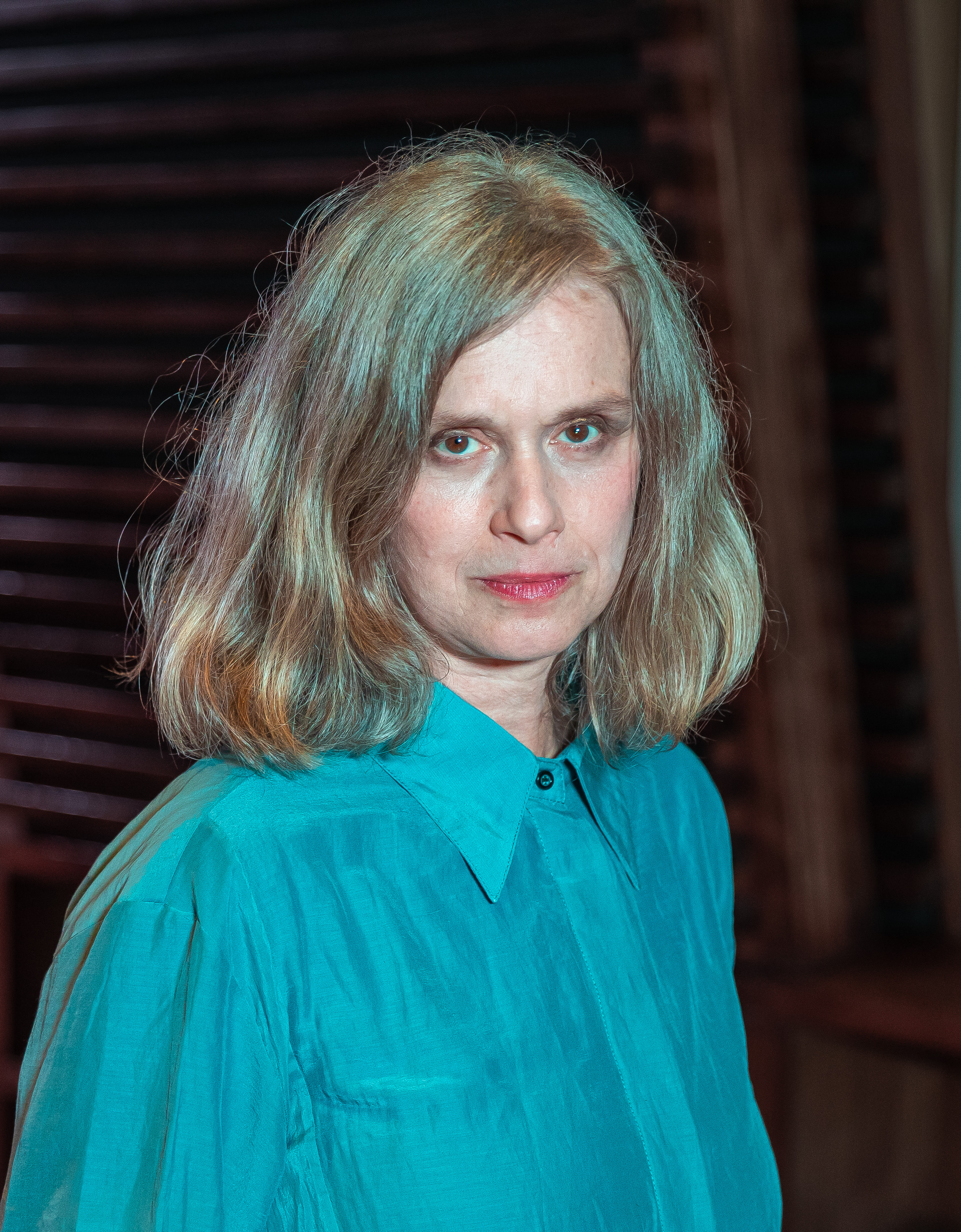
- Molina in 2022
- Born: Juana Rosario Molina Villafañe; 1 October 1961 (age 65); Buenos Aires, Argentina
- Occupations: Singer; songwriter; actress
- Years active: 1988–present
- Parents: Horacio Molina (father); Chunchuna Villafañe (mother)
- Musical career
- Genres: Folktronica; electronic; experimental; art pop
- Instruments: Vocals; guitar; keyboard
- Labels: Domino; Crammed Discs
- Website: juanamolina.com

Juana Rosario Molina Villafañe (Spanish pronunciation: [ˈxwana moˈlina]; born 1 October 1961) is an Argentine singer, songwriter and former actress, based in Buenos Aires. She is known for her distinctive sound, considered an exponent of folktronica, although it has also been described as ambient, experimental, neofolk, chill-out, indietronica, psychedelic, indie pop, and progressive folk.

The daughter of tango singer Horacio Molina and actress Chunchuna Villafañe, she achieved fame as a sketch comedy actress in the 1990s, first as a guest in various shows and in 1991 with her show, Juana y sus hermanas. At the height of her popularity, she quit her job as an actress to pursue a music career. Her debut album, Rara, was subsequently released in 1996, and panned by local critics who resented her departure from television. Discouraged by the criticism, she moved to Los Angeles, where her music had been better received, and she familiarized herself with electronic instruments. She then returned to Buenos Aires to produce her second album, Segundo, incorporating the sonic elements she had learned. Each one of her following albums has added a new complexity to her music, which is characterized by layered loops of acoustic and electronic sounds.

Despite the initial negative reaction to her music in her home country, music critics have consistently acclaimed Molina's work, praising her music and experimentation. In 2013, El País wrote, "she established herself as the star of the avant-garde sound of her country in the world." Writing for The Guardian, Robin Denselow called her the "one-time Queen of Latin chill" and wrote: "[she] has built up a global cult following as one of the most experimental musicians in Argentina."

== Early life ==
Juana Rosario Molina Villafañe was born to a family of artists in Buenos Aires, Argentina, on October 1, 1961. She is the eldest daughter of Horacio Molina, a tango singer, and Chunchuna Villafañe, an actress and model. She has a younger sister who has also worked as an actress and musician. The family lived in the central Buenos Aires barrio of Caballito. Her mother was a record collector, exposing her to various types of music. She began to learn to play the guitar at age 5. In 1967, Juana recorded her first song with her father, "Te regalo esta canción" ("I gift you this song"), as a gift to her mother for Mother's Day. Horacio Molina released the song as a single —without his young daughter knowing—which sold 45 thousand copies. She also performed the song live with her father on national television.

In 1976, the family left for Paris, France, due to the military dictatorship that overthrew President Isabel Perón. While in Paris, she listened to what is now known as "world music" on French radio stations. In various interviews, Molina has recalled a visit to a Spanish hippie family friend who introduced her to Indian classical music, whose drones have had an enduring influence on her music. In 1981, Molina returned to Buenos Aires. To finance her architecture studies, she had various small jobs, including an unsuccessful experience as a backing vocalist in small bands.

== Career ==
As she could not make a living through music, Molina decided to find a job that paid well and did not consume much time. She decided on a career in television as the means to this end and spent some months looking for a show that could use her services. She recorded a homemade audition tape for the studio and was offered a contract the same day. Molina began her television career in 1988 with the ATC show La noticia rebelde ("Rebel News", a wordplay on La novicia rebelde), where she would record one day a week and get paid for five. Her popular sketches parodied porteño women of various social classes. In October of the same year, Molina joined the cast of El mundo de Antonio Gasalla ("Antonio Gasalla's World"), led by comedy actor Antonio Gasalla. The show, which ran until 1990, further cemented her popularity as a sketch comedy actress and writer. The show was also performed live at the Teatro Gran Rex and in Mar del Plata.

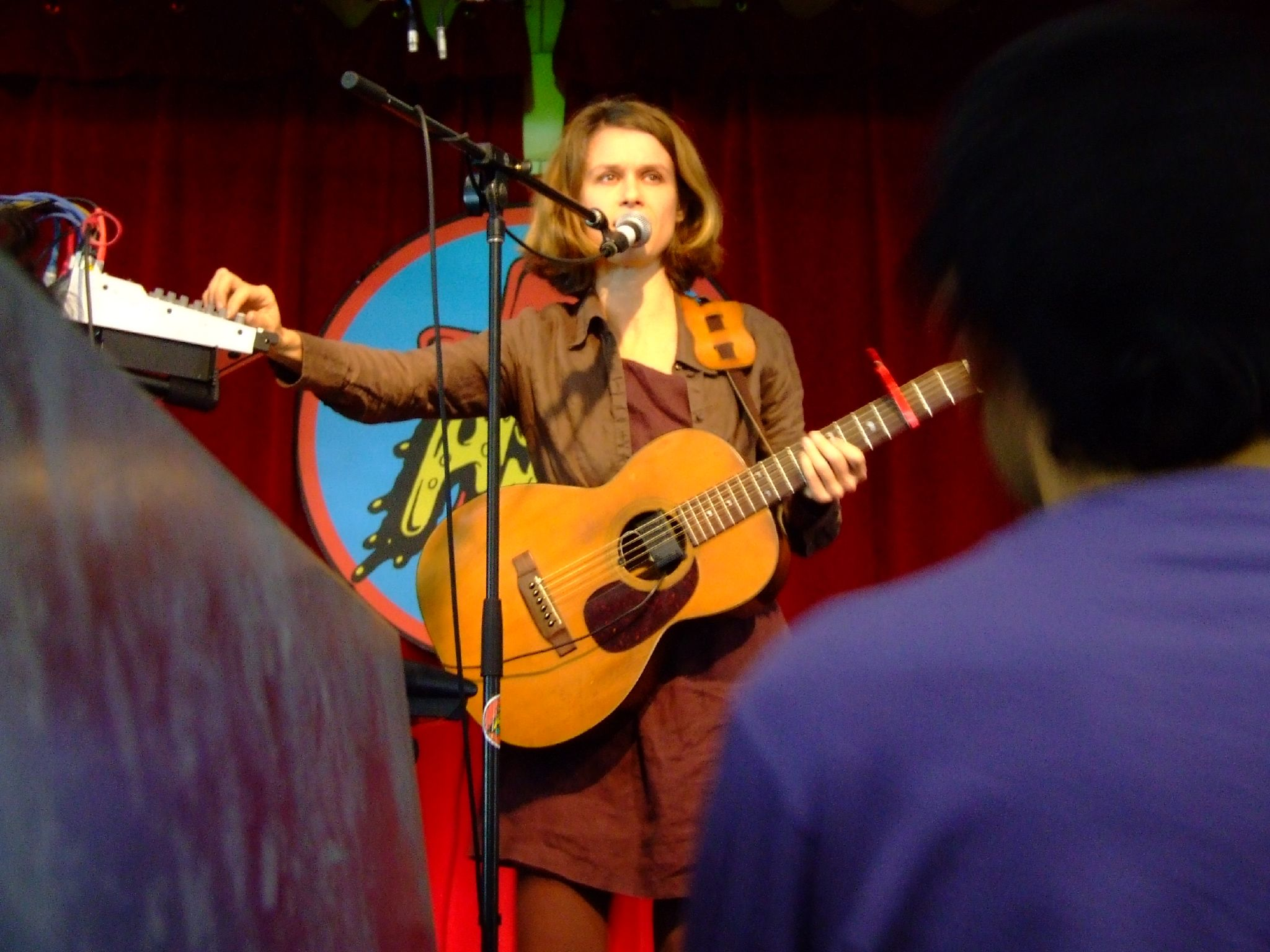
Molina performing in Los Angeles, October 2006.

The pinnacle of her success came with her show, Juana y sus hermanas ("Juana and Her Sisters", a wordplay on Hannah and Her Sisters), which premiered in 1991. Molina became Argentina's most popular comedian, having her show syndicated to other Latin American countries. Molina was dubbed "the new Niní Marshall" by the press, and won two Martín Fierro Awards. A compilation album of songs by Molina featured in the show was released. In 1993 Molina became pregnant with her only child, Francisca, and had to suspend her show. Reflecting on her rapid rise to stardom and distance from the music career she had always wanted, the actress canceled the show in 1994. She recalls: "There was a moment when I imagined myself watching MTV as a decrepit old woman (like MTV would last a lifetime), thinking 'I could have done that.' I pictured myself feeling an infinite grudge, hatred, and envy."

Produced by Gustavo Santaolalla and recorded in 1995, Molina's debut album, Rara, was released in 1996. The album was poorly marketed; Micaela Ortelli of Página/12 wrote: "Never did an Argentine radio play a song from that album, – too pop to be folk and too folk, perhaps, to be radio material." Live shows were also problematic, as audiences expected her to act like on television. The album was better received in Los Angeles, where Molina settled in 1998. Having learned how to record her music, she began to self-produce new material at the request of DreamWorks Records. Although the company ultimately did not sign her, these recordings would become Segundo, her second studio album. By 2000, she had finished recording the album and, back in Buenos Aires, she met Daniel Melero, who mixed the record. The music of Segundo was the result of Molina's new insights into timbre and her meeting with Alejandro Franov, who taught her "the endless sound possibilities that keyboards allow." Despite remaining virtually unknown in her native country, Molina's music found success in Japan, and, to a lesser extent, in Europe. American musician David Byrne bought Segundo — intrigued by its artwork — and quickly became an admirer of the record. He contacted Molina, and she became the opening act of his American tour.

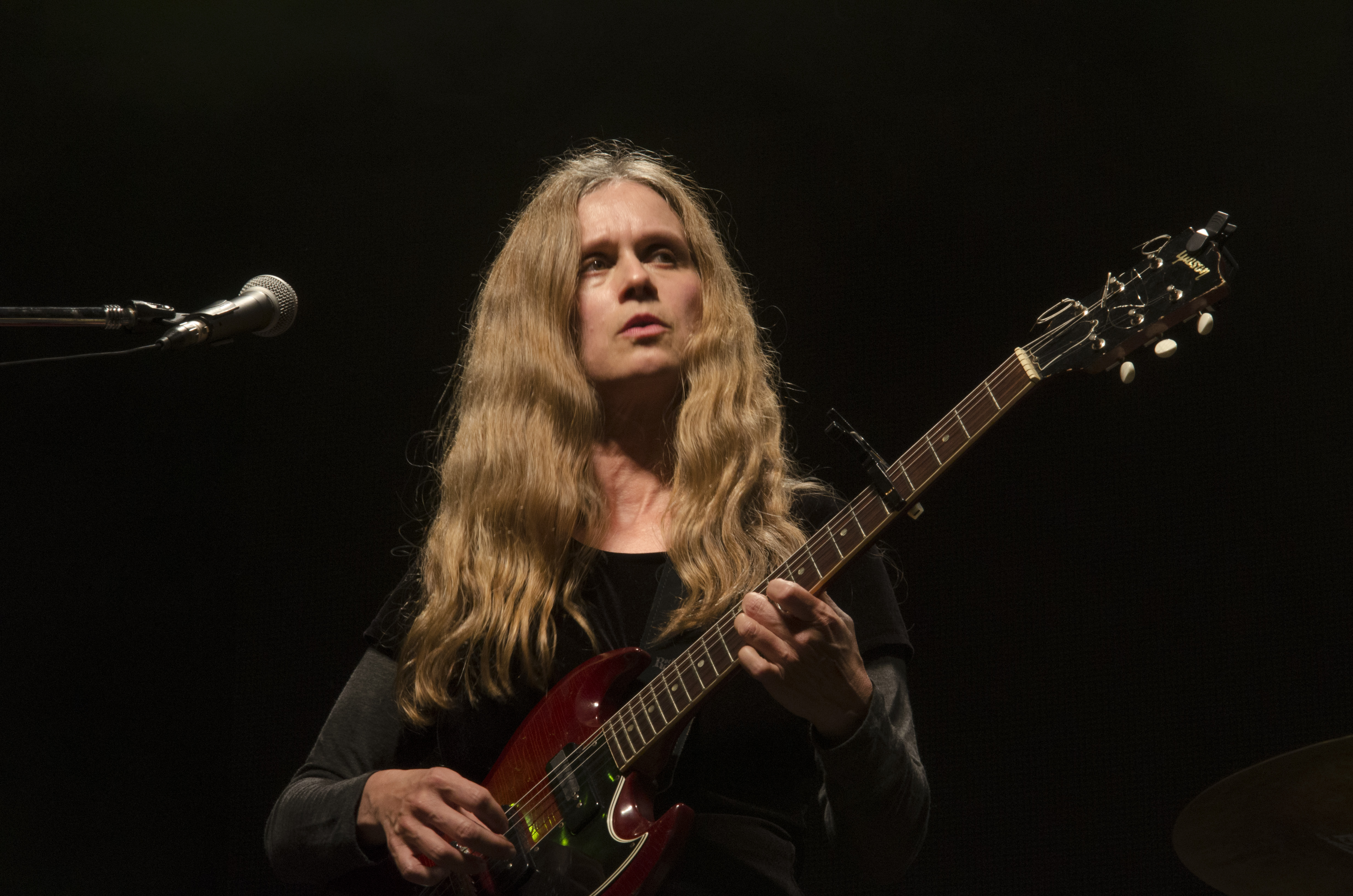
Molina performing in Buenos Aires, November 2014.

== Appearances in other media ==
Molina gained wider exposure with North American public radio listeners when Jad Abumrad used her music to score a 2008 episode of Radiolab and produced a bonus podcast featuring an interview with Molina and a remix of her song "Un día." Molina's song, "Sin dones", from Halo, was used on the episode "Things Bad Begun" in Season 3 of the show Fear the Walking Dead in 2017.

== Discography ==
=== Albums ===
==== Studio albums ====
List of studio albums, with selected information
Title	Album details	Peak chart positions			
Title	Album details	UK Indie	US Dance	US Latin	US Latin Pop
Rara	Released: 1996; Label: MCA; Formats: CD, cassette	—	—	—	—
Segundo	Released: 2000; Label: Domino; Formats: CD, LP, digital download, streaming	—	—	—	—
Tres cosas	Released: 2002; Label: Domino; Formats: CD, LP, digital download, streaming	—	—	—	—
Son	Released: 23 May 2006: Label: Domino; Formats: CD, LP, digital download, streaming	45	—	—	—
Un día	Released: 6 October 2008; Label: Domino; Formats: CD, LP, digital download, streaming	—	—	59	14
Wed 21	Released: 28 October 2013; Label: Crammed Discs; Formats: CD, LP, digital download, streaming	—	21	22	7
Halo	Released: 5 May 2017; Label: Crammed Discs; Formats: CD, LP, digital download, streaming	—	—	—	15
Doga	Releases: 5 November 2025; Label: Sonamos; Formats: LP, digital download, streaming	—	—	—	-
"—" denotes a recording that did not chart or was not released in that territory.

==== Collaborative albums ====
Title	Description
A○○B	Released: 2003; Label: A∩B; Formats: CD

==== Soundtrack albums ====
Title	Description
Juana y sus hermanas	Released: 1991; Label: Epic; Formats: CD, cassette, LP

==== Live albums ====
Title	Description
Anrmal	Released: 23 October 2020; Label: Crammed Discs; Formats: CD, LP, digital download, streaming

=== Extended plays ===
Title	Description
Forfun	Released: 25 October 2019; Label: Crammed Discs; Formats: CD, LP, digital download, streaming
Exhalo	Released: 22 November 2024; Label: Sonamos, Little Butterfly; Formats: LP, digital download, streaming

=== Singles ===
==== As lead artist ====
Title	Year	Album
"Te regalo esta canción" / "Eso eres mamá" (with Horacio Molina and Inés Molina)	1967	Non-album single
"Sálvese quien pueda"	2005	Tres cosas
"Un día (Reboot remix)"	2010	Non-album single
"Eras"	2013	Wed 21
"Cosoco"	2017	Halo
"Las culpas II"	2018	Non-album single
"Paraguaya Punk"	2019	Forfun

==== As featured artist ====
Title	Year	Album
"Slow Motion Detonation" (Deerhoof featuring Juana Molina)	2017	Mountain Moves
"Al sur" (The Notwist featuring Juana Molina)	2021	Vertigo Days
