= Doga (album) =

2025 album by Juana Molina

Studio album by Juana Molina
- Released: 5 November 2025
- Recorded: 2020–2025
- Studio: Juana Molina's home studio (General Pacheco, Greater Buenos Aires, Argentina); Sonorámica (Traslasierra, Córdoba, Argentina); Hotel2Tango (Montreal, Canada)
- Genre: Experimental; electronic
- Length: 57:58
- Language: Spanish
- Label: Sonamos
- Producer: Molina; Emilio Haro; Mario Agustín de Jesús González

Juana Molina chronology
Halo (2017)	Doga (2025)

Singles from Doga
- 1. "Siestas ahí" Released: 25 September 2025

Doga is the eighth studio album by Argentine musician Juana Molina. It was released on 5 November 2025 by Sonamos, an independent record label she co-founded in 2021. Doga marks Molina's first release of new original compositions in eight years, and her first collaboration with a producer since her troubled debut album Rara (1996). The origin of these compositions dates back to 2019, when Molina prepared a series of concerts called Improviset alongside keyboardist and frequent collaborator Odín Schwartz, during which they recorded at least sixty hours of improvisation using analog synthesizers and sequencers.

The recording sessions of the album took place between 2020 and 2025 at Molina's home studio in General Pacheco, Greater Buenos Aires; at the Sonorámica residential studio in Traslasierra, Córdoba Province; and at Hotel2Tango in Montreal, where she collaborated with Canadian musicians Leslie Feist, Andrew Barr and Howard Bilerman. Molina enlisted Haro as producer after developing most of the material, needing help to select and condense many hours of recordings into an album. Haro pushed Molina to re-record the songs multiple times and think of the lyrics, a departure from her usual working methods.

Doga received universal acclaim from music critics, who praised its experimental, genre-defying sound as an evolution of her established musical identity, with some calling it her best work to date.

== Composition ==
"Siestas ahí"
Lead single "Siestas ahí" has been described as the most accessible song of the album.

Critics have noted that Doga continues but evolves Molina's distinctive musical style, which resists easy categorization into any particular genre or scene. In an interview, she explained: "The most I ever thought before any album was 'I'm going to do something different.' And for that I have to start from another place. But I also found that, no matter where I start from, I always come back to myself." Writing for Jenesaispop, Jordi Bardají felt that her songs "contain sonic universes, and in Doga the way they evoke certain styles is fascinating, but always from a twisted vision that makes them almost impossible to identify." Molina's music is characterized by the combination of electronic sounds, such as synthesizers and programming, with organic elements including guitar, vocals, bass and drums. After a stint in commercial alternative rock with her unsuccessful debut album, Rara in 1996, she developed a self-produced sound through the use of loops, which she introduced in her breakthrough albums Segundo (2000) and Tres cosas (2002), a period in which she was often described as an exponent of folktronica. Writing for The Fader, Raphael Helfand noted that: "Each of the seven studio LPs she's released since [her debut] has revealed new facets of her songwriting and arranging—minimal, lush, hazy, motorik. In his review of Doga, Pitchfork's Walden Green noted that Molina "has spent nearly three decades abstracting South American folk music into rhizomatic root networks that entwine the digital with the acoustic." Although she has maintained her distinctive style, over the following decades the folk-related elements of her music, which were more acoustic and immediate, have evolved towards more electronic and abstract sounds, culminating in her 2017 album Halo.

Doga represents a deepening of this evolution in her sound, and has been described as "slipperier and more revealing than any of its predecessors", and "her most warped yet immediate material to date, retaining the element of curious melody that defined her early recordings while enveloping them in hypnotic synth grooves." Sergio Sánchez of Página/12 described the album as "eleven experimental, unpredictable, and playful pieces." Writing for Rockdelux, Jesús Rodríguez Lenin felt that the artist closest to Molina musically is Lucrecia Dalt, with whom he collaborated on a song from her latest album, but that with Doga, "she has shaped a very different work, made up of experimental and avant-garde sounds that she nevertheless manages to transform into something accessible and enveloping." Much of the sound on the album focuses on the sound of old analog synthesizers, which give the record its distinctive sonic character. According to Green, on Doga, Molina's "fascinations have shifted from the paranormal to the paranatural. She cherry-picks synthetic textures that mimic the most terrifying sounds you can hear in your own backyard—a fisher cat's cry, a coyote's howl, the humming of a wasp's nest under the eaves.

== Songs ==
The album opens with "Uno es árbol", which features the cryptic lyrics "One is tree/One is not sleeping tree/In untree/One is asleep/The untree/In untree/One is not sleeping tree." Writing for Pitchfork, Walden Green suggested that the song's "churning morass (...) offers no purchase save one of Molina's distinctive, hypnotic basslines." Jeff Terich of Treblezine compared its sound to early industrial music and minimal synth, with "effects like warping metal bent around its persistent three-note bassline". Rodríguez Lenin characterized the beginning of "La paradoja" as "almost as machinal as a Suicide song, although with a kinder voice." Likewise, Bardají felt that the rhythms in "Uno es árbol" and "La paradoja" are "almost krautrock", and compared that the latter's instrumental base to synth-punk. In "Desinhumano", Molina's guitar "takes on the twang of a Chinese guzheng", as she took inspiration by the tale of Sun Wukong, with the lyrics: "The monkey strides with his eager heart to be immortal", and "The master, generous, imparts his wisdom/Swiftly, the monkey learns, yet proudly he fails him/Uninhuman!/He will fall, he will fall." Noé R. Rivas of Mindies described "Caravanas" as "a sonic journey", where, like its tittle suggests, each layer "seems to chase the previous one, creating an effect of continuous movement". Molina's finished it after a trip to Canada, and stated that it is one of her favorite songs on the record.

Doga's lead single, "Siestas ahí", was named its most accessible song. It features a "cutesy, almost lullaby-like charm", with lyrics about intimacy and "moving closer to another's softness and dissolving in their presence", supported by swaying guitars and subdued synths that feel "both sweet and quietly disorienting". According to Rivas, the analog sequencers of "Indignan a un zorzal" produce a rhythm that "seems autonomous, beyond human control"; like they were "machines (...) developing their own behavior." Molina stated that the lyrics of "Va rara" were conceived as "a necessary complement to be able to sing", but that she did not elaborate them much when composing the song. Furthermore, she said: "For a while now I've been (...) threatening (...) that one day I'm going to compose songs without lyrics. (...) I have a lot to say musically (...). That's why it's essential for me that the words don't interfere with the music."

The title of "Intringulado", the album's second-to-last song, is "an invented word to describe a mess all tangled up." Its lyrics center around material attachment and the value of objects that carry memories; specifically, it evokes the argument of a trio of sisters about a teapoot. This impresion is reinforced by the use of violins, the track's lead instruments. Green described the songs "Rina soi" and "Miro todo" as "droning epics", characterizing the former as a "disquieting MIDI lullaby" and saying of the latter that it "should lay to rest once and for all the question: what if Rebekah Del Rio from Mulholland Drive fronted Led Zeppelin?". "Rina soni" features synthesizers sound that have compared to Autechre's early work; while the guitars of "Miro todo" transform at the one-and-a-half-minute mark of the song to a sound similar of out-of-tune violins, something Molina deliberately sought out.

== Critical reception ==
Professional ratings
Review scores
Source	Rating
Le Devoir	4/4 stars
Música Instantânea	8.2/10
Jenesaispop	7.6/10
Mindies	8.1/10
Musikexpress	4/5 stars
Pitchfork	8.1/10
Still Listening	90/100
Uncut	9/10

Doga was met with widespread acclaim from music critics, both in her home country and internationally. Le Devoir gave the album a full-score rating, with critic Amélie Revert noting that its songs form a "whole of remarkable fluidity, anchored in a space of freedom that could be associated with a Kafkaesque universe." In a favorable review, Walden Green of Pitchfork praised the album's hypnotic and sombre sound and described it as a "whimsically unsettling mix of sing-song melodies, ghostly electronics, and lyrics that probe the absurdity of the human condition." Jenesaispop's Jordi Badarjí felt the album was a "tremendously unique and original work", although it "may not be the most accessible of her career". Writing for Treblezine, Jeff Terich praised the album's arrangements and stated: "The stunning diversity of material that Molina has drawn out of that initial flood of improvisational material isn't necessarily all that surprising given its foundational wealth, nor is the cohesion for that matter. Yet that Doga pulls off both, a deep well of inspiration that all feels aesthetically intertwined and impeccably executed, makes it such a triumphant return." The Fader's Raphael Helfand praised Molina's "renewed determination" and described Doga as containing "some of her most inventive production yet", as well as writing: "Like any great work of art, it's the product of an artist stepping outside their default settings to reach for something hidden in the ether." Jesús Rodríguez Lenin of Rockdelux lauded the album as the "most complete" of her entire career and felt that although its experimental style "may show a disquieting form, is, nonetheless, comforting." Tape Op's Geoff Stanfield called Doga "another masterwork" of Molina's career, noting: "It has all of the signature destabilizing elements that immediately transport the listener into another dimension, but it is also the most fully realized of all of her work."

Billboard Argentina included Doga in its list of "The 50 Albums That Defined 2025", describing it as a "work that progresses intuitively, that sticks with you more for its rhythm than its melody, and that leaves you with the impression that you were part of something more than just listening to a piece of music." Rolling Stone listed Doga at number 7 in its list of "The Best Latin Albums of 2025", with the album's entry describing Molina as "one of Latin America's most intriguing artists, building mysterious soundscapes that feel like finding your way through some kind of enchanted forest while in a deep trance", and the record as a "performance spectacle you want to get lost in again and again". Counting only Argentine artists, Doga is the third best Argentine album of 2025 on Rolling Stone's list. Joan Escutia of Vogue México y Latinoamérica ranked it at number 3 on his list of "The 30 Best Latin Music Albums of 2025", writing: "The figure of Juana Molina in the musical universe of Latin America is omnipresent. With more than thirty years creating the most mind-blowing experiments in Argentine music, her influence is almost palpable, and it's in Doga where she reaffirms this abundantly." Jenesasispop ranked Doga at number 36 on its list of the "Best International Albums of 2025". Dutch magazine Oor ranked Doga as the 263th best album of 2025. The lead single "Siestas ahí" ranked at number 75 on Pitchfork's list of "The 100 Best Songs of 2025", with critic Stefanie Fernández praising its "primordial backdrop of synthesizer and acoustic loops", while "Caravanas" appeared at number 37 on Rolling Stone's list of "The 50 Best Latin and Spanish-Language Songs of 2025".

== Track listing ==
All tracks are written by Juana Molina.

No.	Title	Length
1.	"Uno es árbol"	4:27
2.	"La paradoja"	5:51
3.	"Desinhumano"	4:07
4.	"Caravanas"	4:06
5.	"Siestas ahí"	4:30
6.	"Indignan a un zorzal"	5:21
7.	"Va rara"	4:12
8.	"Miro todo"	8:52
9.	"Intringulado"	4:31
10.	"Rina soi"	9:32
11.	"Me gusta igual" (hidden track)	2:29
Total length:		57:58

== Personnel ==
Credits adapted from Molina's official website and Doga's Bandcamp release.

- Juana Molina — composition, lyrics, performance, production, mixing, recording (home sessions in General Pacheco), synthesizers (1, 5, 8, 10), keyboards (1), base (10)
- Emilio Haro — production, mixing, recording assistant (2024–2025 sessions), guitar (2), programming (2, 5, 7–8)
- Mario Agustín de Jesús González — production (8), mixing, production assistant, recording assistant (2021–2025 sessions), synthesizers (8)
- Odín Schwartz — recording assistant (2020 sessions), keyboards (1), bass (6), synthesizers (6), base (10)
- Diego López de Arcaute — synthesizers (1, 10), percussion (1, 9), drums (2–3, 6, 8), sampling (9)
- Leslie Feist — executive production (4, 7)
- Andrew Barr — executive production (4, 7), percussion (4)
- Daniel Osorio — mastering at El Ángel Estudio in Buenos Aires
- Matías Sznaider — recording at Sonorámica in Traslasierra
- Howard Bilerman — recording at Hotel2Tango in Montreal (4, 7)
- Alejandro Ros — artwork design
- Sarah Page — harp (4, 7)
- Todd Dahlhoff — electric bass (4),
- Robbie Kuster — nail organ vibrations (4), hand saw (7)
- Julio Dominguez — violin (9)
- Verena Algranti — photography
- Sebastián Ruíz — recording assistant (2023 sessions at Sonorámica)
- Mati Medús — recording assistant (2023 sessions at Sonorámica)
- Shae Brossard — recording assistant (2023 sessions at Hotel2Tango)
