= Your Choice Live Series 020 =

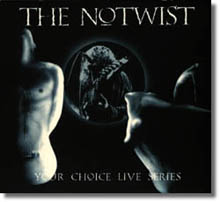

Live album by The Notwist
- Released: 1994
- Genre: Indie rock, Electronica, Ambient, Noise rock
- Label: Your Choice Records
- Producer: Tobby Holzinger

Your Choice Live Series 020 is an official live album containing material by The Notwist. It was recorded live at "Logo" in Hamburg / Germany by "Norddeutscher Rundfunk" on January 11, 1994 and the "Kulturstation" in Munich / Germany by Andy Jung on the February 26, 1993. "Unsaid Undone" was recorded live in the "Rock Radio B9" / Berlin in June 1993. Munich show mixed in December 1993 by Andy Jung at "Don´t come on Monday Studios" / Berlin.

== Track listing ==
All tracks are written by The Notwist.

No.	Title	Length
1.	"Electric Bear"	3:08
2.	"Incredible Change of Our Alien"	5:59
3.	"Agenda"	3:03
4.	"I´ve Not Forgotten You"	3:20
5.	"Instr."	2:34
6.	"Unsaid Undone"	2:48
7.	"M. Del Terror"	1:55
8.	"Nook"	3:16
9.	"One Wasted"	3:58
10.	"Nothing Like You"	3:59
11.	"12"	11:30

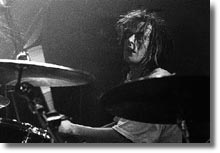
Mecki Messerschmidt (The Notwist)

== Personnel ==
- The Notwist
  - Markus Acher - Guitar, vocals
  - Michael Acher - Bass
  - Mecki Messerschmidt - Drums
- Tobby Holzinger - Producer
