= 12 (The Notwist album) =

Studio album by the Notwist
- Released: 1995
- Genres: Alternative rock, indie rock, noise rock, post-hardcore
- Length: 39:04
- Label: Zero Hour/Community

The Notwist chronology
Nook (1992)	12 (1995)	Shrink (1998)

12 is an album by the Notwist, released in 1995. It has been described as a transition album between the earlier, punk rock and metal sound of The Notwist and Nook and the later, electronica and plinkerpop Shrink and Neon Golden. It was re-released in 2003 following the success of Neon Golden.

Professional ratings
Review scores
Source	Rating
AllMusic	3/5 stars
NME	7/10
PopMatters	favorable

== Track listing ==
1. "Torture Day" – 6:10
2. "My Phrasebook" – 2:00
3. "Puzzle" – 3:44
4. "M" – 4:12
5. "Noah" – 5:30
6. "My Faults" – 3:14
7. "The String" – 4:30
8. "Instr." – 2:49
9. "12" – 6:55
