= Nook (album) =

Studio album by the Notwist
- Released: 1992
- Genres: Alternative metal, indie rock, post-hardcore
- Length: 40:57
- Label: Community/Bubbleco

The Notwist chronology
The Notwist (1991)	Nook (1992)	12 (1995)

Professional ratings
Review scores
Source	Rating
AllMusic	3/5 stars
PopMatters	not rated

Nook is the second full studio album by The Notwist. The album explores the band's earlier sound of hardcore punk and punk as opposed to electronica. It was re-released in 2003 following the success of Neon Golden.

== Track listing ==
All tracks written by Markus Acher, unless otherwise noted.

1. "Belle de L'ombre / Walk On" – 4:15
2. "Unsaid, Undone" – 2:50
3. "Welcome Back" – 2:47
4. "Nook" – 3:33
5. "No Love" – 5:05
6. "Incredible Change of Our Alien" – 5:24
7. "This Sorry Confession" – 2:46
8. "Another Year Without Me" – (Micha Acher) - 3:30
9. "One Dark Love Poem" – 2:50
10. "Only Thing We Own" – 1:51
11. "I'm a Whale" – 6:06

== Personnel ==
- Markus Acher - guitar, vocals; saxophone (1)
- Micha Acher - bass, trumpet
- Martin Messerschmid - drums
- Olu Fummi Layo-Ajayi - vocals (2)
