= Shrink (album) =

Studio album by the Notwist
- Released: 15 May 1998
- Recorded: 1997
- Studio: Uphon (Weilheim in Oberbayern)
- Genres: Indie electronic; post-rock; indie rock; jazz
- Length: 48:24
- Label: Community
- Producer: Galore

The Notwist chronology
12 (1995)	Shrink (1998)	Neon Golden (2002)

Singles from Shrink
- 1. "Day 7" Released: May 1997; 2. "Chemicals" Released: March 1998

Professional ratings
Review scores
Source	Rating
AllMusic	4/5 stars
NME	7/10
Pitchfork	7.6/10

Shrink is the fourth studio album by German indie rock band the Notwist. It was released on 15 May 1998 by the label Community. The album found the band moving further away from their punk rock origins and pursuing a sound more rooted in electronic music.

== Track listing ==
All lyrics are written by Markus Acher.

No.	Title	Music	Length
1.	"Day 7"	Markus Acher	5:55
2.	"Chemicals"	Markus Acher	5:15
3.	"Another Planet"	Markus Acher	4:30
4.	"Moron"	Micha Acher	4:46
5.	"Electric Bear"	Markus Acher	4:28
6.	"No Encores"	Martin Gretschmann	4:25
7.	"N.L."	Micha Acher	5:36
8.	"Shrink"	Markus Acher	4:24
9.	"Your Signs"	Micha Acher	6:46
10.	"0-4"	Micha Acher	2:19
Total length:			48:24

== Personnel ==
Credits are adapted from the album's liner notes.

The Notwist

- The Notwist – vocals, guitars, bass, drums, keyboards, trombone, trumpet, vibraphone, electronics, samples
  - Markus Acher
  - Micha Acher
  - Martin Gretschmann
  - Martin Messerschmid

Additional musicians

- Bibul – percussion
- Johannes Enders – concert flute, tenor saxophone
- Andreas Gerth – Yamaha RY30 drum machine, theremin
- Tobias Kuhn – backing vocals on "Day 7"
- Wolfgang Petters – guitar on "Day 7"
- Christian Schantz – double bass
- Stefan Schreiber – bass clarinet
- Stefan Staudt – vibraphone
- Axel von Hoyningen-Hüne – cello

Production

- Galore – production
- O.L.A.F. Opal – mixing, recording
- Mario Thaler – mixing, recording

Design

- Thorsten Buhe – photography
- Andreas Gerth – cover artwork, cover design
- Planwerk – cover design

== Charts ==
Chart (1998)	Peak position
German Albums (Offizielle Top 100)	49
