= Good Lies (disambiguation) =

Good Lies is a 2023 album by Overmono.

Good Lies may also refer to:

- "Good Lies", song by the Notwist from The Devil, You + Me
- "Good Lies", song by Mariah Carey from Caution
- "Good Lies", episode 5 of season 2 of the TV series Step Dave

== See also ==
- The Good Lie, a 2014 film
