= Close to the Glass =

Studio album by the Notwist
- Released: 25 February 2014
- Genres: Electronic, experimental, post-rock
- Length: 47:26
- Labels: City Slang, Sub Pop

The Notwist chronology
The Devil, You + Me (2008)	Close to the Glass (2014)	The Messier Objects (2015)

Close to the Glass is the seventh studio album by German electronic band the Notwist. It was released on 24 February 2014 under City Slang in Europe. It was released on 25 February 2014 under Sub Pop in the United States.

== Critical reception ==
Professional ratings
Aggregate scores
Source	Rating
Metacritic	75/100
Review scores
Source	Rating
AllMusic	4/5 stars
Alternative Press	3.5/5 stars
The A.V. Club	B+
Consequence of Sound	C+
Drowned in Sound	7/10
MusicOMH	4.5/5 stars
Pitchfork	6.4/10
PopMatters	6/10 stars
Tiny Mix Tapes	3/5 stars

At Metacritic, which assigns a weighted average score out of 100 to reviews from mainstream critics, the album received an average score of 75% based on 23 reviews, indicating "generally favorable reviews".

At Alternative Press, Reed Fischer rated the album three-and-a-half out of five stars, stating that "Close To The Glass resembles ice-skate carvings on a frozen lake: jagged, cold but filled with fractured ambient beauty." Heather Phares of AllMusic rated the album four stars, noting "the way they join the organic and the electronic, the cerebral and the emotional on Close to the Glass makes it the most thoroughly rewarding and enjoyable album of the Notwist's career to date."

Close to the Glass received a nomination for IMPALA's European Independent Album of the Year Award.

== Track listing ==
No.	Title	Length
1.	"Signals"	3:41
2.	"Close to the Glass"	2:57
3.	"Kong"	4:31
4.	"Into Another Tune"	3:57
5.	"Casino"	3:14
6.	"From One Wrong Place to the Next"	2:44
7.	"7-Hour-Drive"	3:57
8.	"The Fifth Quarter of the Globe"	0:49
9.	"Run Run Run"	5:04
10.	"Steppin' In"	2:00
11.	"Lineri"	8:52
12.	"They Follow Me"	5:41

== Charts ==
Chart	Peak position
German Albums Charts	6
US Heatseekers Albums (Billboard)	8
US Tastemaker Albums (Billboard)	15
