= Rara (album) =

Studio album by Juana Molina
- Released: 1996
- Recorded: 27 October – 20 December 1995
- Studio: Track Records; La Casa; Colombia Estudios; Estudios Panda; (Buenos Aires)
- Genre: Alternative rock; folk-pop
- Length: 40:04
- Language: Spanish
- Label: MCA Records
- Producer: Gustavo Santaolalla

Juana Molina chronology
Juana y sus hermanas (1991)	Rara (1996)	Segundo (2000)

Rara (Spanish for "weird" or "strange") is the debut studio album by Argentine musician Juana Molina, released in 1996 by MCA Records. Prior to launching her musical career, Molina had established herself as one of the Argentina's most popular comedians, particularly through her sketch show Juana y sus hermanas, which began airing in 1991 and was syndicated to other Latin American countries. Molina has stated that she always intended to pursue a career in music, and that her initial foray into television was conceived as a well-paid job requiring relatively little effort, but that she ultimately became too absorbed by it. Between 1993 and 1994, she left her show due to pregnancy, during which time she concluded that she had long postponed her desire to pursue music and decided to permanently abandon her television career at the height of her popularity.

== Background and composition ==
"When I started writing songs, I never understood why you always had to have verse, chorus and bridge, because music has infinite combinations, and I wanted to free myself from that predetermined structure. I always played things that were different, but I worried that they seemed ridiculous and that people would think they were junk."

— Juana Molina interviewed by The New York Times, 2006.

Juana Molina is the daughter of tango singer Horacio Molina and of Chunchuna Villafañe, a prominent Argentine model and cultural figure of the 1960s, and was exposed to music from an early age through her father, who gave her her first guitar and encouraged a broad and non-hierarchical understanding of sound. Following the onset of Argentina’s last civic-military dictatorship in 1976, Molina went into exile with her family and spent part of her adolescence in Paris, an experience she later described as formative but also marked by a sense of displacement and the need to adapt to unfamiliar cultural environments.

Although Molina always regarded music as her primary vocation, she first achieved widespread public recognition in Argentina as a comic actress during the late 1980s and early 1990s, initially through her work with Antonio Gasalla and later as the creator and star of her own sketch program, Juana y sus hermanas. The program was highly successful and syndicated across Latin America, establishing Molina as one of the country’s most recognizable television figures at the time. She later explained that acting felt emotionally secure because she was inhabiting fictional characters, whereas songwriting involved exposing her own inner life, making her far more sensitive to external judgment in music than in performance.

In 1993–1994, while on bed rest during pregnancy, Molina underwent a period of reflection that proved decisive for her artistic trajectory, realizing that her television career had gradually displaced the musical ambitions she had long postponed. She later recalled imagining a future in which she had abandoned music altogether, an outcome she found intolerable, prompting her decision to leave television and pursue a recording career in her early thirties. Molina has stated that television had initially been a pragmatic means of financial survival that was intended to support her musical development, but that it ultimately became a self-perpetuating system that left little space for composition or experimentation.

"... well, the first record, it wasn't me. I just wrote the songs and the arrangements, but the producer took control and he told me how it had to sound."

— Juana Molina interviewed by The Believer, 2006.

Initially insecure about performing her own songs publicly, Molina approached her debut album by closely following established industry conventions, later remarking that she did “everything she was supposed to do.” She enlisted producer Gustavo Santaolalla, recorded with a full band, and signed with the multinational label MCA Records, becoming the first Latin American artist to be signed directly by the U.S.-based company with the explicit intention of developing her as an international act. In later interviews, Molina explained that at the time she believed she needed external guidance to make a record and assumed that someone else had to define how an album should sound, an attitude she would later come to reject.

Rara was recorded between 27 October and 20 December 1995 at Track Records and La Casa studios in Buenos Aires, with additional vocals recorded at Colombia Estudios and Estudios Panda. Molina later described the recording process as lengthy and cumbersome, involving months of rehearsals and the production of multiple demos that she felt were far removed from her original intentions. She noted that, at the time, transforming demos directly into finished recordings was considered unviable, a contrast she later drew with her subsequent working methods, which relied on home recording and allowed for greater autonomy and immediacy.

Although it marked the formal beginning of her musical career, Rara was not technically Molina’s first release, as it was preceded by an album compiling songs from her television program Juana y sus hermanas. Earlier still, in 1968, at the age of six, she made her first musical recording in a duet with her father, titled “Te regalo esta canción.”

Musically, Rara occupies a distinct place within Molina’s discography as her only album shaped by a conventional full-band format, external production, and the framework of a major international label. The album has been described as drawing primarily on alternative rock and folk-pop, featuring polished arrangements and traditional verse–chorus structures that differ markedly from the loop-based, repetitive constructions that would later characterize her work. Molina later stated that Santaolalla guided the record toward the alternative rock aesthetic dominant at the time, resulting in an album she considered technically accomplished but lacking the personal “inner world” that defined her subsequent releases.

Writing for Pitchfork in 2017, Matthew Ismael Ruiz observed that Molina’s early, repetitive songwriting impulses—built around “simple things, repetitive melodies comprised of a few notes and chords”—were largely “dressed up with a chorus, verse, and bridge,” yielding a record that offered only “glimpses of the rhythmic experimentation she would later explore more fully.” Similarly, The New York Times characterized Rara as a “typical singer-songwriter effort,” featuring a conventional rhythm section and a crisp, mainstream production. Retrospectively, Remezcla described lead single “Sólo en sueños” as “perhaps the most traditional rock sound Molina will ever give us.”

== Release and reception ==
The commercial performance of Rara failed to meet the expectations of both the production team and Molina herself, who later described it as a "great failure" in interviews. According to Micaela Ortelli of Página/12, the album was poorly marketed and noted that "no Argentine radio station ever played a song from that album—too pop to be folk and too folk, perhaps, to be radio-friendly (...)." The album's release was also hampered by an internal dispute between the between MCA's subsidiaries, with Molina recalling in 2024 that she "went from being promised by the label's president that I would be the face of MCA in Latin America to having no distribution in any Latin American country." Together with her manager and then-husband Federico Mayol, she recovered the undistributed copies and began selling and distributing them independently.

A music video was released for "Sólo en sueños", which Richard Villegas of Remezcla described as channeling "90s alt-rock vibes", evoking artists such as Alanis Morissette and The Breeders, and showing "early signs of Juana's affinity for the conceptual". The clip depicts Molina in "a flooding apartment kitchen", where she drinks milk, experiences childhood flashbacks and plays with her band, including what Villegas described as a "peak 90s oddball dream sequence" with split-screen imagery. Although the music video received airplay on MTV, she explained that "if anyone wanted to buy an album after seeing it, they couldn't find it."

Fernando Kabusacki, a guitarist who worked with Molina throughout 2003, later recalled: "They would tell her to go back to comedy, and backstage afterwards she would be in tears. But she was courageous and from the very start had a clear vision of the music she wanted to make."

== Legacy ==
Rara occupies a particular place in Molina's career, as it marked her closest approach to a commercially oriented, producer-driven and relatively conventional sound. This, added to the troubled circumstances surrounding its release, have led the album to be frequently excluded from the "canon" of her discography. It is frequently discussed in retrospect for its significance in her artistic development, as the unsuccessful experience prompted her to abandon that approach and pursue the experimental sound and self-producing direction for which she later became known. She self-produced her following albums and did not work with an external producer again until the release of Doga in 2025. Rara has remained out of print, is unavailable on digital platforms, and is generally regarded as a rare release.

Despite having repeatedly expressed dissatisfaction with the album and distancing herself from it, Molina acquired the rights to the songs on Rara 27 years after its release and announced in 2024 that she was in the process of re-recording the entire album, as she does not own the original phonogram. Interviewed by El Destape, she explained this decision: "I felt it was unfair for that album to remain like that, dead and abandoned in a drawer. It makes me want everything I've done to exist in a complete form." She further expressed that the "people who are fans of the record are very much fans of that record. It gives me pleasure to be able to return to them the possibility of listening to it again and for it to be there. I want to try to do it the same, but I don’t know if it will come out the same."

For the re-recording of Rara, Molina contacted two of the musicians with whom she had originally recorded the album—Mariano Domínguez on bass and Javier Mattanó on guitar—and performed songs from the album with them at a show at Parador Konex in Buenos Aires in January 2024. When asked by Página/12 how it felt to reunite with the musicians from Rara so many years later, she replied: "I'm very well. I get along very well with them. We reconnected after recording the album (in the '90s). We played a bit, then stopped seeing each other... I reconnected with them about 13 or 14 years ago, when I started going to sing at La Grande and they were the regular musicians there. I liked that reunion. We have a very family-like, easy relationship; we've known each other for ages. I liked going back to doing things with them."

== Track listing ==
All tracks are written by Juana Molina, except for track 1, whose melody was co-written with Inés Molina.

Rara
No.	Title	Length
1.	"Ella en su cuaderno"	3:42
2.	"En los días de humedad"	3:20
3.	"Vergüenza es robar y que lo vean"	4:27
4.	"Se hacen amigos"	3:46
5.	"Hoy supe"	3:06
6.	"Rara"	3:08
7.	"Sólo en sueños"	6:00
8.	"Pintaba"	4:50
9.	"Buscá bien y no molestes"	4:20
10.	"Antes"	3:25
Total length:		40:04

== Personnel ==
Credits adapted from Rara's liner notes.

- Juana Molina – acoustic guitar, composer, vocals, electric guitar in "Hoy supe", bass in "Sólo en sueños", cover art painting
- Gustavo Santaolalla – producer, percussion, twelve-string guitar in "Hoy supe", classical guitar and tubular bells in "Sólo en sueños"
- Mariano Domínguez – bass
- Javier Mattanó – electric guitar
- Martín Ibarburu – drums
- Aníbal Kerpel – associate producer, recording and mixing, effects guitar in "Sólo en sueños"
- Tony Peluso – recording and mixing
- Javier Casalla – violin in "Buscá bien y no molestes"
- Gerry Simbres – assistant engineer
- Paul Laguna – assistant engineer
- Steve Hall – mastering
- Alejandra Palacios – photographs
- Urko Suaya – photographs
- Patrick Liotta – photographs
- Alejandro Ros – design
