= Neon Golden =

Studio album by the Notwist
- Released: 14 January 2002
- Studio: Uphon (Weilheim in Oberbayern)
- Genres: Indie electronic; post-rock; art rock
- Length: 41:28
- Label: City Slang
- Producer: Galore

The Notwist chronology
Shrink (1998)	Neon Golden (2002)	The Devil, You + Me (2008)

Singles from Neon Golden
- 1. "Trashing Days" Released: 27 August 2001; 2. "Pilot" Released: 19 November 2001; 3. "Pick Up the Phone" Released: 18 March 2002

Neon Golden is the fifth studio album by German indie rock band the Notwist. It was released on 14 January 2002 by City Slang.

== Composition ==
Neon Golden is rooted in the experimental musical style that The Notwist had moved towards on their previous two studio albums 12 (1995) and Shrink (1998), which found the band eschewing the abrasive rock of their early work and delving into electronic music. The songs on Neon Golden fuse indie rock and electronic elements, taking influence from styles such as glitch and IDM. The A.V. Club described the album as a "synthesis of dreamy indie-rock balladry and stark electronic underpinnings", while MusicOMH critic Dylan Kilby referred to it as a work of "electronic post-rock".

== Release ==
The song "Pick Up the Phone" was released on 18 March 2002 as the second single from Neon Golden. It was featured in "Betty and Veronica", an episode of the television series Veronica Mars.

"One with the Freaks" was listed as the 318th best song of the 2000s by Pitchfork Media. It is part of the soundtrack of the film The Family Friend by Paolo Sorrentino.

== Critical reception ==
Professional ratings
Aggregate scores
Source	Rating
Metacritic	89/100
Review scores
Source	Rating
AllMusic	4/5 stars
Alternative Press	4/5
Drowned in Sound	10/10
The Guardian	3/5 stars
The Independent	4/5 stars
Muzik	4/5
Pitchfork	9.2/10
Rolling Stone	3/5 stars
Uncut	4/5 stars
The Village Voice	B−

At Metacritic, which assigns a weighted average score out of 100 to reviews from mainstream critics, Neon Golden received an average score of 89 based on 20 reviews, indicating "universal acclaim". The album was acclaimed upon its initial release in Europe in 2002, while in the United States, it was widely hyped well before its official February 2003 release date due to its circulation via import copies and file sharing. In The Village Voice's 2003 Pazz & Jop poll, Neon Golden was voted by critics as the year's 33rd best album.

Pitchfork ranked Neon Golden at number 131 on its list of the 200 best albums of the 2000s. Neon Golden has been cited by critics as a landmark album of indie electronic, or "indietronica", music; Tristan Gatward of Loud and Quiet remarked in 2019 that the sound of indie electronic music in the 2000s "was dictated" by the record. In 2014, PopMatters writer Jose Solis described it as a "truly groundbreaking" album that "set in motion an electronica-meets-indie rock revolution that [would] define the sound of a decade."

== Track listing ==
All lyrics are written by Markus Acher, except where noted.

No.	Title	Music	Length
1.	"One Step Inside Doesn't Mean You Understand"	Markus Acher; Micha Acher	3:15
2.	"Pilot"	Markus Acher; Micha Acher; Martin Gretschmann	4:28
3.	"Pick Up the Phone"	Gretschmann	3:55
4.	"Trashing Days"	Micha Acher	3:24
5.	"This Room"	Markus Acher; Micha Acher; Gretschmann; Martin Messerschmid	4:45
6.	"Solitaire" (lyrics by Gretschmann)	Gretschmann	3:29
7.	"One with the Freaks"	Markus Acher	3:38
8.	"Neon Golden"	Markus Acher; Micha Acher	5:54
9.	"Off the Rail"	Markus Acher; Micha Acher	3:27
10.	"Consequence"	Micha Acher	5:13
Total length:			41:28

2003 US edition bonus tracks
No.	Title	Music	Length
11.	"Scoop"	Markus Acher; Gretschmann	3:26
12.	"Propeller 9"	Micha Acher; Gretschmann	4:25
13.	"Formiga"	Markus Acher; Micha Acher; Gretschmann	2:21
Total length:			51:40

Sample credits

- "Solitaire" contains elements from Drowning by Numbers, composed by Michael Nyman.

The 2003 US issue bonus tracks had been released as a 2002 promotional EP titled "Untitled (Scoop)", reissuing a title, ("Scoop"), that had first appeared on the 2000 Morr Music compilation Putting the Morr Back in Morrissey.

== Personnel ==
Credits are adapted from the album's liner notes.

The Notwist

- Markus Acher
- Micha Acher
- Martin Gretschmann
- Martin Messerschmid

Additional musicians

- Biboul F. Darouiche – conga
- Roberto Di Gioia – keyboards, piano
- Johannes Enders – tenor saxophone
- Sebastian Hess – cello
- Robert Klinger – double bass
- Saam – cajón, kanjira, zarb
- Ulrich Wangenheim – bass clarinet, alto saxophone, tenor saxophone

Production

- Chris Blair – mastering
- Galore – production
- O.L.A.F. Opal – mixing, recording
- Mario Thaler – mixing, recording

Design

- Philipp Arnold – cover design
- Andreas Gerth – cover design

== Charts ==
Chart (2002)	Peak position
Austrian Albums (Ö3 Austria)	28
Belgian Alternative Albums (Ultratop Flanders)	25
European Top 100 Albums (Music & Media)	46
French Albums (SNEP)	66
German Albums (Offizielle Top 100)	10
UK Independent Albums (Official Charts)	47
