= Different Cars and Trains =

Different Cars and Trains EP

EP by the Notwist
- Released: 2003
- Genre: Indie, electronica
- Length: 30:01
- Label: Big Store/Domino

The Notwist chronology
Solo Swim EP (2004)	Different Cars and Trains EP (2003)

Professional ratings
Review scores
Source	Rating
Pitchfork Media	(6.6/10)

Different Cars and Trains is a 2003 EP from German electronica band the Notwist.

== Track listing ==
1. "Neon Golden (Console Remix)" (Markus Acher, Michael Archer, Martin Gretschmann) - 4:46
2. "Pilot (Console Remix)" (Acher, Archer, Gretschmann) - 4:55
3. "Red Room" (Acher, Gretschmann) - 6:11
4. "This Room (Four Tet and Manitoba Remix)" (Archer, Archer, Gretschmann, Martin Messerschmid) - 8:06
5. "Different Cars and Trains (Loopspool Version)" (Acher, Archer, Andreas Gerth) - 5:50

== Personnel ==
- Markus Acher - guitar, vocals
- Michael Acher - bass
- Martin Gretschmann (aka Console) - programming
- Martin Messerschmidt - drums
