= The Messier Objects =

Studio album by the Notwist
- Released: February 3, 2015
- Genre: Electronic
- Length: 54:10
- Label: Alien Transistor

The Notwist chronology
Close to the Glass (2014)	The Messier Objects (2015)	Vertigo Days (2021)

Professional ratings
Aggregate scores
Source	Rating
Metacritic	49/100
Review scores
Source	Rating
AllMusic	3.5/5 stars
Exclaim!	6/10
The Line of Best Fit	6.5/10
PopMatters	2/10

The Messier Objects is the eighth studio album by German electronic band the Notwist. It was released in February 2015 under Alien Transistor Records.

== Track list ==
No.	Title	Length
1.	"Object 1"	1:52
2.	"Object 2"	1:56
3.	"Object 3"	2:04
4.	"Object 4"	2:44
5.	"Object 5"	3:16
6.	"Object 6"	3:28
7.	"Object 7"	3:08
8.	"Object 8"	2:10
9.	"Object 9"	3:34
10.	"Object 10"	2:20
11.	"Object 11"	3:45
12.	"Object 12"	2:11
13.	"Object 13"	2:01
14.	"Object 14"	1:38
15.	"Object 15"	2:16
16.	"Das Spiel Ist Aus"	12:54
17.	"Object 16"	2:53
