= Rocket in the Pocket =

Studio album by Console
- Released: September 1998 – Europe; 21 March 2000 – US
- Genres: Electronica; experimental
- Labels: Payola Records; Matador

Console chronology
Pan or ama (1997)	Rocket in the Pocket (1998)	Reset the Preset (2003)

Rocket in the Pocket is a 1998 electronica album released by Console. After receiving critical acclaim, the album was re-issued in 1999, 2000 and 2002.

The song "Crabcraft" – which samples Orchestral Manoeuvres in the Dark's "Sacred Heart" – was used by Björk on her 2001 album Vespertine for the song "Heirloom".

== Track listing ==
1. "My Dog Eats Beats" – 6:06
2. "14 Zero Zero" – 3:47
3. "Gull Galore" – 5:08
4. "Dolphin Dos" – 5:25
5. "Pigeon Party" – 4:32
6. "Delay Dackel" – 3:01
7. "Crabcraft" – 5:12
8. "Rocket in the Pocket" – 5:11
9. "Bee-Queen" – 5:29
10. "Walk Like a Worm" – 4:50

== Critical reception ==
Professional ratings
Review scores
Source	Rating
AllMusic	3.0/5 stars
