= The Devil, You + Me =

Studio album by the Notwist
- Released: 17 June 2008
- Genre: Indie rock
- Length: 43:54
- Labels: Big Store, City Slang
- Producers: The Notwist, Olaf Opal

The Notwist chronology
Neon Golden (2002)	The Devil, You + Me (2008)	Close to the Glass (2014)

Singles from The Devil, You + Me
- 1. "Where in This World" Released: 2008; 2. "Boneless" Released: 2008

Professional ratings
Aggregate scores
Source	Rating
Metacritic	74/100
Review scores
Source	Rating
AllMusic	3.5/5 stars
The A.V. Club	B
Drowned in Sound	8/10
Pitchfork	7.7/10
PopMatters	7/10 stars
Slant Magazine	3/5 stars
Tiny Mix Tapes	2.5/5 stars

The Devil, You + Me is the sixth studio album by German indie rock band the Notwist. It was released in 2008.

== Critical reception ==
At Metacritic, which assigns a weighted average score out of 100 to reviews from mainstream critics, the album received an average score of 74% based on 22 reviews, indicating "generally favorable reviews".

Andy Kellman of AllMusic gave the album 3.5 stars out of five and said, "you might want to take it everywhere with you, even when you can only replay it in your mind." Dave Hughes of Slant Magazine gave the album three stars out of five, commenting that "it merely and consistently recalls the band's more emotionally satisfying earlier work, while rarely equaling or surpassing it."

== Track listing ==
No.	Title	Length
1.	"Good Lies"	5:23
2.	"Where in This World"	4:38
3.	"Gloomy Planets"	4:49
4.	"Alphabet"	3:02
5.	"The Devil, You + Me"	3:39
6.	"Gravity"	3:56
7.	"Sleep"	3:46
8.	"On Planet Off"	5:06
9.	"Boneless"	2:55
10.	"Hands on Us"	4:28
11.	"Gone Gone Gone"	2:09

== Charts ==
Chart	Peak position
German Albums Charts	10
US Heatseekers Albums (Billboard)	11
US Independent Albums (Billboard)	33

In 2010. It was awarded a silver certification from the Independent Music Companies Association which indicated sales of at least 30,000 copies throughout Europe.
