= Vertigo Days =

Studio album by the Notwist
- Released: 29 January 2021
- Genres: Electronic; indie pop
- Length: 49:26
- Label: Morr Music

The Notwist chronology
The Messier Objects (2015)	Vertigo Days (2021)

Professional ratings
Aggregate scores
Source	Rating
AnyDecentMusic?	7.1/10
Metacritic	75/100
Review scores
Source	Rating
AllMusic	4/5 stars
Beats Per Minute	80%
Exclaim!	7/10
Pitchfork	7/10
PopMatters	7/10
Under the Radar	7/10

Vertigo Days is the ninth studio album by German electronic band the Notwist. It was released on 29 January 2021 by Morr Music.

== Release ==
On 31 July 2020, the Notwist's released the first single "Ship". The single features Japanese musician Saya Uenon of Tenniscoats.

The second single "Oh Sweet Fire" was released on 9 October 2020. Jazz musician Ben LaMar Gay features on the single.

== Critical reception ==
Vertigo Days was met with "generally favorable" reviews from critics. At Metacritic, which assigns a weighted average rating out of 100 to reviews from mainstream publications, this release received an average score of 75 based on 10 reviews. AnyDecentMusic? gave the release a 7.1 out of 10 based on 9 reviews.

Writing for AllMusic, Heather Phares said: "Vertigo Days' ranginess suits the Notwist; after all, they've always resisted easy categorization, and they've rarely sounded as loose and spontaneous as they do here. The album's scope is so big that its smaller moments could get lost in the shuffle, but its details are just as memorable as its broad strokes." Tim Sentz of Beats Per Minute wrote: "While Vertigo Days boasts a heap of guest musicians, none ever outshine The Notwist, something that can often happen on guest-heavy albums. Instead, this cast of characters from around the world does wonders for their sound and makes for an intriguing and rewarding listen every time." At Exclaim!, Eric Hill gave the release a 7-out-of=10, while noting "Vertigo Days has a familiar but notably updated and refined palette of sounds. Micha charts a course in sound that touches on everything from light chamber baroque to hints of Tropicália in fresh new combinations. Markus, as always, finds the pockets to insert gentle, hook-laden guitar melodies and fragile-voiced lyrics. The ambitions, expansions, and collaborations on Vertigo Days mostly pay off, sacrificing a little thematic cohesion for the reward of greater variety in sound." PopMatters said: "The 14 tracks on Vertigo Days function as nuggets of noise. There are rhythms and drops, meaningful pauses and blather, atmospherics that drift into nothingness, and abrasive sonics. Listening can be a trip maybe one doesn't want to take except as an escape from reality."

In a review for Under the Radar, the album was described: "While past releases included more concrete pop melodies, the songs here are decidedly more abstract and moodier, with woozy orchestrations that reach back in time to remind us of the jazz-rock explorations of Soft Machine and Krautrock pioneers Can. Most tracks feel more like conceptual musical ideas rather than fully formed songs with clever arrangements, peculiar horns, and a rhythmic interplay of motley instrumentation."

== Commercial performance ==
On 5 February 2021, the album peaked at number 5 in Germany, staying on the chart for 5 weeks.

== Track listing ==
Vertigo Days track listing
No.	Title	Length
1.	"Al Norte"	1:01
2.	"Into Love / Stars"	5:44
3.	"Exit Strategy to Myself"	3:09
4.	"Where You Find Me"	2:32
5.	"Ship" (featuring Saya)	4:04
6.	"Loose Ends"	5:32
7.	"Into the Ice Age" (featuring Angel Bat Dawid)	6:22
8.	"Oh Sweet Fire" (featuring Ben Lamar Gay)	3:50
9.	"Ghost"	1:24
10.	"Sans Soleil"	3:16
11.	"Night’s Too Dark"	2:55
12.	"Stars"	1:11
13.	"Al Sur" (featuring Juana Molina)	3:26
14.	"Into Love Again" (featuring Zayaendo)	5:09

== Personnel ==
Adapted from the liner notes of the album.

- The Notwist – all vocals, guitars, bass, drums, percussion, keyboards, electronics, record player, pedals, etc.
  - Markus Acher
  - Micha Acher – brass- and stringarangements
  - Cico Beck
- Max Punktezahl – guitar
- Karl Ivar Refseth – vibraphone, percussion
- Andi Haberl – drums
- Theresa Loibl – clarinet, bass clarinet
- Ulrich Wangenheim – alto flute, clarinet, bass clarinet
- Mathias Götz –trombone
- Fabian Striffler – violin
- Saya - vocals on "ship", harmony and chorus vocals on "Into love/Stars"
- Angel Bat David – clarinet and vocals on "Into the Ice Age"
- Ben LaMar Gay – vocals on "Oh Sweet Fire"
- Juana Molina – vocals, keyboards, and electronics on "Al Sur"
- Zayaendo on "Into Love Again"
  - Saya – vocals, melodica
  - Satomi Endo – soprano saxophone
  - Kiyokazu Onozaki – melodica
  - Kiriko Kawamatsu – trombone
  - Kanako Ueda – clarinet
  - Ken Manabe – tenor saxophone
  - Yutaka Hirose – tuba
  - Tomoaki Saito – mandolin
  - Takashi Ueno – banjo
  - Mitsuru Tanaka – percussion

== Charts ==
Chart performance for Vertigo Days
Chart (2021)	Peak position
Austrian Albums (Ö3 Austria)	17
Belgian Albums (Ultratop Wallonia)	143
German Albums (Offizielle Top 100)	5
Swiss Albums (Schweizer Hitparade)	22
