= Segundo (Juana Molina album) =

Studio album by Juana Molina
- Released: 2000
- Length: 70:04
- Languages: Spanish; English
- Labels: Domino, re-issued on Crammed Discs in 2014 and 2021
- Producer: Juana Molina

Juana Molina chronology
Rara (1996)	Segundo (2000)	Tres cosas (2002)

Professional ratings
Review scores
Source	Rating
AllMusic	4.5/5 stars
Entertainment Weekly	A
The Milk Factory	4.8/5
Uncut	9/10

Segundo (Spanish for "second") is the second studio album by Argentine musician Juana Molina. It was named Best World Music Album 2003 by Entertainment Weekly.

== Track listing ==
Segundo track listing
No.	Title	Length
1.	"Martín Fierro"	4:56
2.	"¿Quién?"	2:39
3.	"El perro"	6:40
4.	"¡Que llueva!"	3:54
5.	"La visita"	2:17
6.	"Quiero"	2:39
7.	"Mantra del bicho feo"	7:59
8.	"El desconfiado"	3:07
9.	"El zorzal"	3:04
10.	"El pastor mentiroso"	4:51
11.	"Misterio uruguayo"	4:19
12.	"Vaca que cambia de querencia"	3:48
13.	"MedDlong"	3:50
14.	"Sonamos"	9:03
15.	"The Wrong Song"	6:56
Total length:		70:04
