= Tres cosas =

2002 studio album by Juana Molina

Studio album by Juana Molina
- Released: 2002
- Length: 57:38
- Language: Spanish
- Label: Domino
- Producer: Juana Molina

Juana Molina chronology
Segundo (2000)	Tres cosas (2002)	Son (2006)

Tres cosas (Spanish for "three things") is the third studio album by Argentine musician Juana Molina. It was released in 2002.

== Critical reception ==
Professional ratings
Aggregate scores
Source	Rating
Metacritic	76/100
Review scores
Source	Rating
AllMusic	4.5/5 stars
Entertainment Weekly	B+
Pitchfork	7.2/10
Spin	B+
Stylus	D+
Tiny Mix Tapes	4/5
Uncut	2/5 stars
The Village Voice	C

According to the review aggregator Metacritic, Tres cosas received "generally favorable reviews" based on a weighted average score of 76 out of 100 from 15 critic scores. The New York Times listed it sixth best pop album of 2004.

== Track listing ==
All tracks are written by Juana Molina.

No.	Title	Length
1.	"No es tan cierto"	3:13
2.	"El cristal"	5:03
3.	"Sálvese quien pueda"	5:58
4.	"¡Uh!"	3:33
5.	"Tres cosas"	3:58
6.	"Yo sé que"	5:55
7.	"Isabel"	4:22
8.	"Lamba corta"	2:22
9.	"Sólo su voz"	4:10
10.	"Cúrame"	6:34
11.	"Filter Taps"	4:12
12.	"El progreso"	5:25
13.	"Insensible"	2:53
Total length:		57:38

== Personnel ==
- Juana Molina – audio production, composer, main personnel, primary artist, vocals
- Alejandro Franov – keyboards, main personnel, vocals (background)
- Petra Haden – violin
- Martin Iannaccone – viola
- Fernando Kabusacki – guitar
- Francisca Mayol – xylophone
