= The Notwist (album) =

Studio album by the Notwist
- Released: 1991
- Genres: Alternative metal, hardcore punk, punk rock
- Length: 32:57
- Label: Subway Records

The Notwist chronology
The Notwist (1991)	Nook (1992)

Professional ratings
Review scores
Source	Rating
AllMusic	3/5 stars
Pitchfork	(6.5/10)

The Notwist is the self-titled debut album from the German musical group the Notwist. The record presents a side of the band which has subsided considerably during their recent recordings. Early incarnations of the group saw them exploring very broad avenues of punk and metal, while they would later veer more toward an abstract electronic and indie feel.

== Track listing ==
All songs written by Markus Acher, unless otherwise noted.

1. "Is It Fear?" – 3:08
2. "Bored" – 2:40
3. "Winter" – 3:18
4. "Crack It Open" – 2:32
5. "Be Reckless" – (Micha Acher) - 1:39
6. "K. das Devil" – 1:15
7. "One Wasted" – 3:24
8. "Agenda" – 2:32
9. "I've Not Forgotten You" – 2:56
10. "M. del Terror" – 1:40
11. "Seasons" – 3:32
12. "Think for Yourself" – 1:26
13. "Nothing Like You" – 3:55

== Personnel ==
- Markus Acher - guitar, lead vocals (all but 11)
- Micha Acher - bass
- Martin Messerschmid - drums
- Evil David - lead vocals (11), backing vocals (1)
- Christoph Merk - backing vocals (2)

== Charts ==
Chart performance for The Notwist
Chart (2021)	Peak position
German Albums (Offizielle Top 100)	75
