= Console (musician) =

Electronic music project

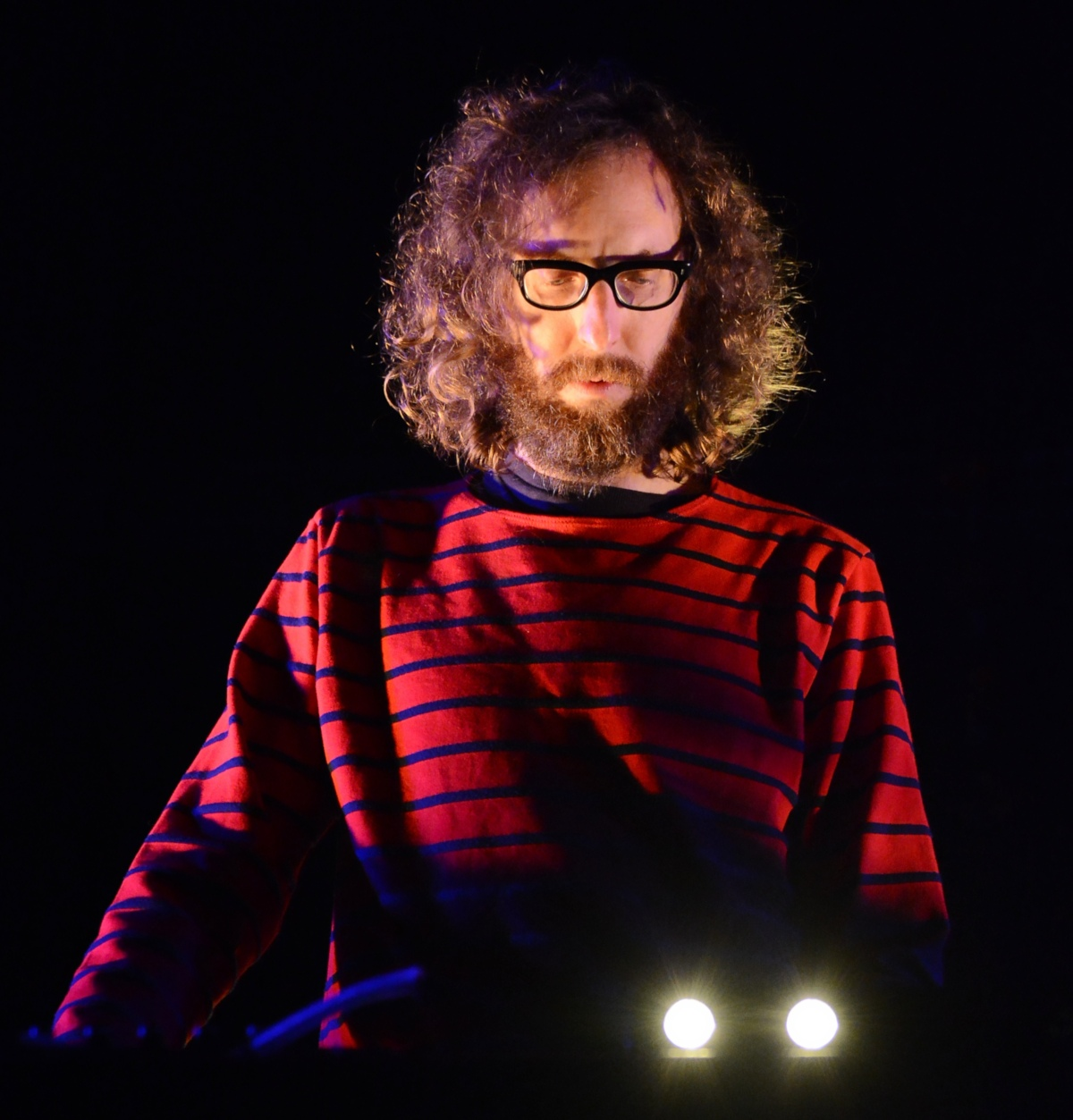
- With The Notwist at Traumzeit-Festival 2014

Background information
- Origin: 8 September 1973, Schongau, Bayern, Germany
- Genres: Electronic
- Years active: 1996 – present
- Labels: Virgin Records; Disko B
- Members: Martin Gretschmann; Miriam Osterrieder; Christoph Brandner; Axel Fischer; Michael Schwaiger; Anton Kaun

Console (also known as Acid Pauli) is an electronic music project founded by Martin Gretschmann, the former lead programmer for the German band The Notwist. The band incorporates elements of electronic music. The band consists of Miriam Osterrieder (vocals, keyboard), Christoph Brandner (drums), Axel Fischer (MS10, guitar), Michael Schwaiger (keyboard, pad), Anton Kaun (visuals), and Martin Gretschmann (computer).

Born in Bavaria, Martin Gretschmann started playing bass in various independent rock bands as early as the early 1990s with Axel Fischer, Matthias Laub, and Christian Schröcker, and played numerous concerts (including supporting The Notwist tour). The first publication of three electronic pieces under the name Console took place in 1995 via the indie label Kollaps on the sampler The Day My Favorite Insect Died. From 1996 Gretschmann became a member of The Notwist.

In 1997 the debut album Pan Or Ama was released on the Weilheim label Payola. In 1999 Console followed with 14 Zero Zero, his most successful single to date. In 2001 he published his piece "Crabcraft" practically unchanged as "Heirloom" on Björk's request for her album Vespertine; "Crabcraft" itself samples Orchestral Manoeuvres in the Dark's "Sacred Heart". Since 1998 Console has also been working with the radio play author Andreas Ammer. Pieces such as On the Tracks and Spaceman '85 were created, with which the two also toured Germany.

Around the turn of the century, Gretschmann started performing as Acid Pauli, a label evocative of his style, which he described as "somewhere between ambient and techno":

It was a very good friend of mine who shouted 'Acciiiiidd Pauliiii' at a small illegal party in Munich, some 20 years ago, [...] I was playing with a laptop only. The software was Rebirth, which emulates the acid machines: Roland TB-303, TR909, and 808. Everything you did with this software sounded like acid house. The nickname Paul was given to me by some schoolmates.

In 2005 Gretschmann opened at the Munich club Rote Sonne together with Peter Wacha, Dorothea Zenker, Richard Rieger, Bernd Bergmann, and Sven Künast. For the film Es war einmal Indianerland (2017), Gretschmann composed the film music as Acid Pauli.

== Discography ==
	Year	Title	Type
	1996	Lady-Bug	Single
	1997	Pan or ama	Album
	1998	Rocket in the Pocket	Single
	1998	Rocket in the Pocket	Album
	1999	14 Zero, Zero	Single
	1999	Loopspool (Note: with Ammer (Andreas Ammer))	Album
	1999	Bugs&Beats&Beasts	Album
Jun	2000	Freiburg 3.0 (Note: with Tocotronic)	Single
Nov	2000	A+A=B	Single
	2000	The Official Olympic Bootleg	Album
	2001	Live At Centre Pompidou	Album
	2002	Dirt On The Wire	Single
	2002	Suck And Run	Single
	2002	IS&DN	Album
Jan	2003	Reset the Preset	Album
	2003	On The Tracks	Album
	2005	Spaceman 85	Album
Aug	2006	Mono	Album
	2010	Herself	Album
Oct	2012	Get Lost V	Album

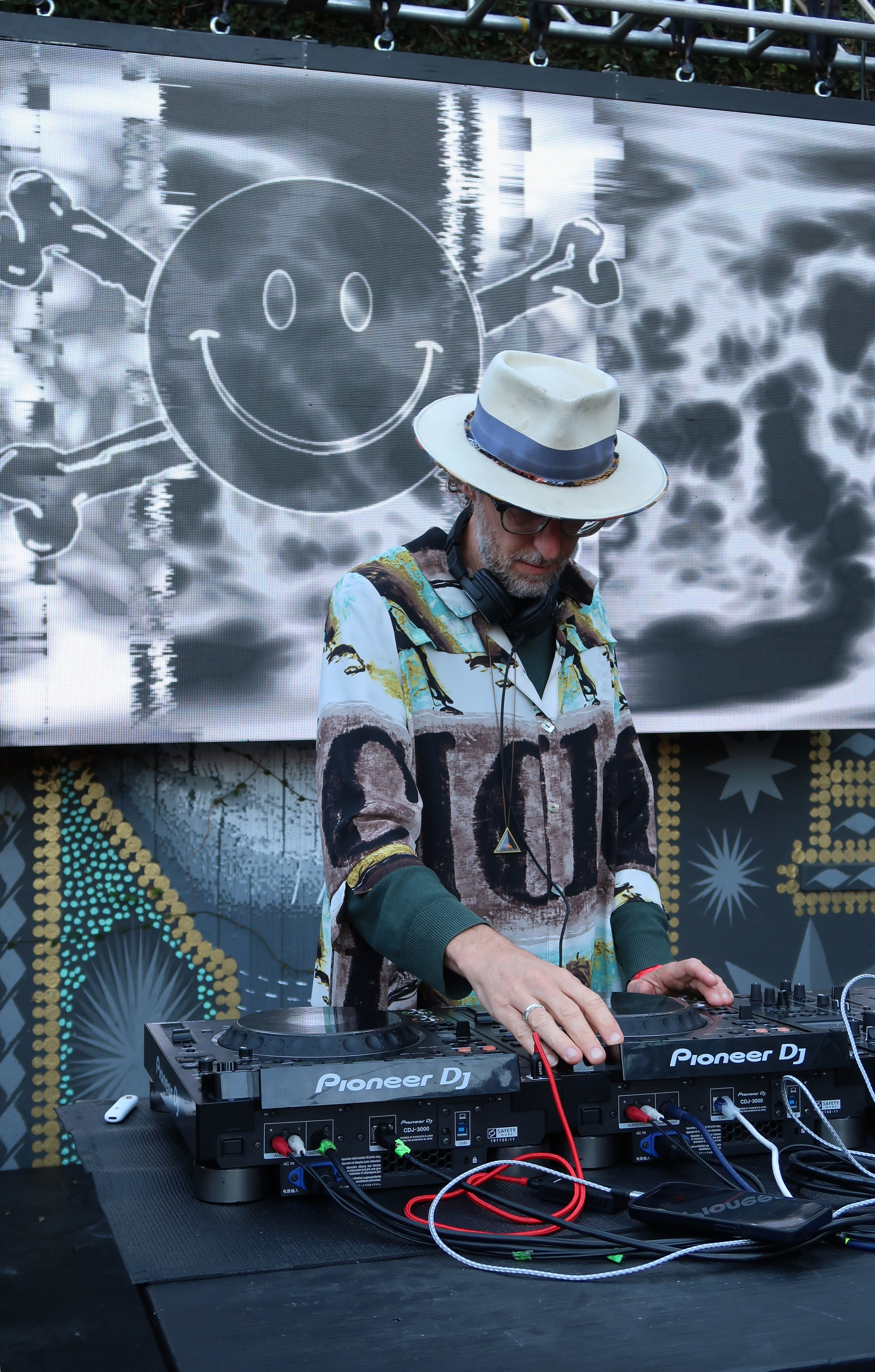
At The Midway patio, San Francisco, 2023

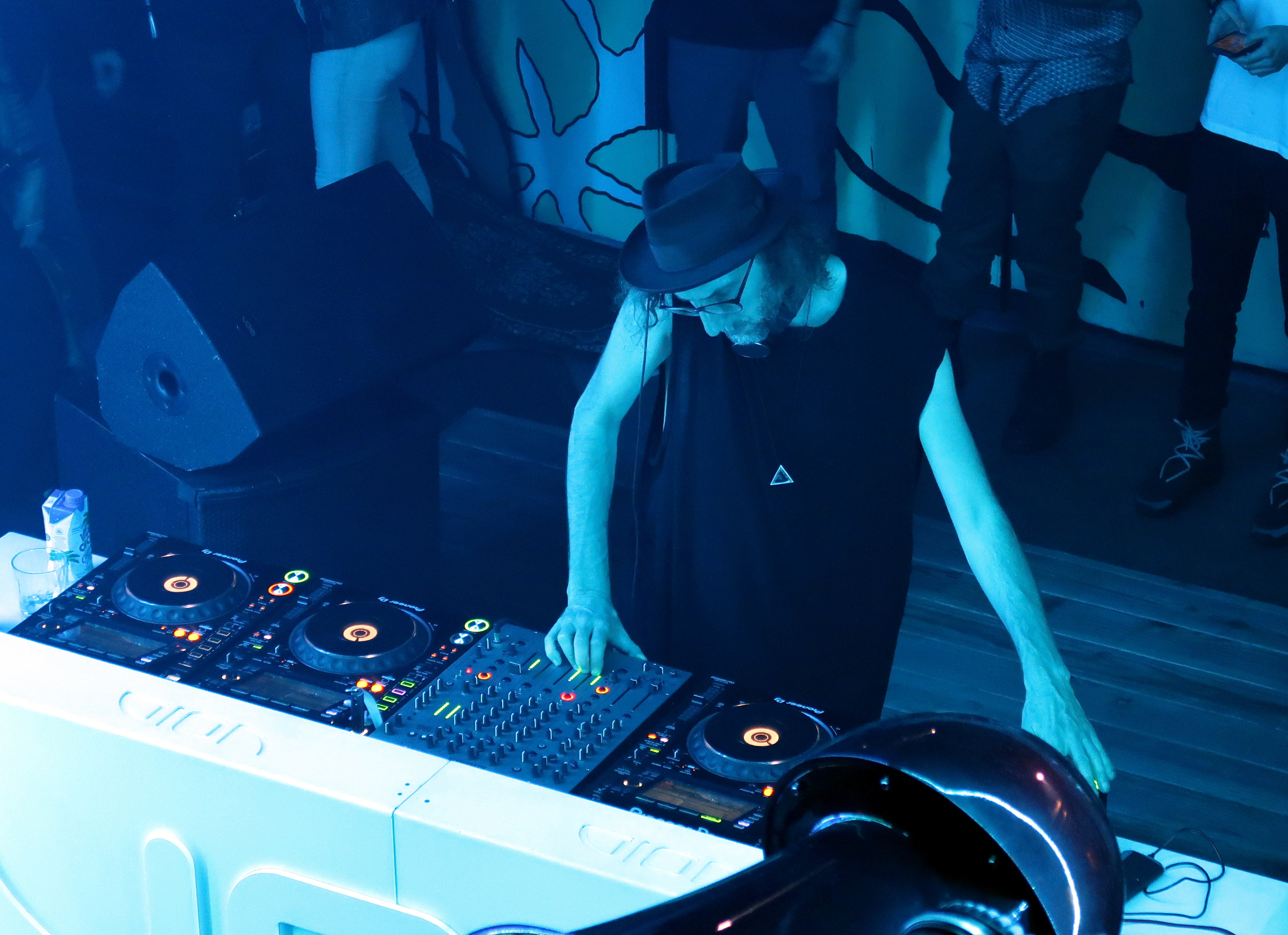
Performing at Pineapple Live event, San Diego CA, 2021

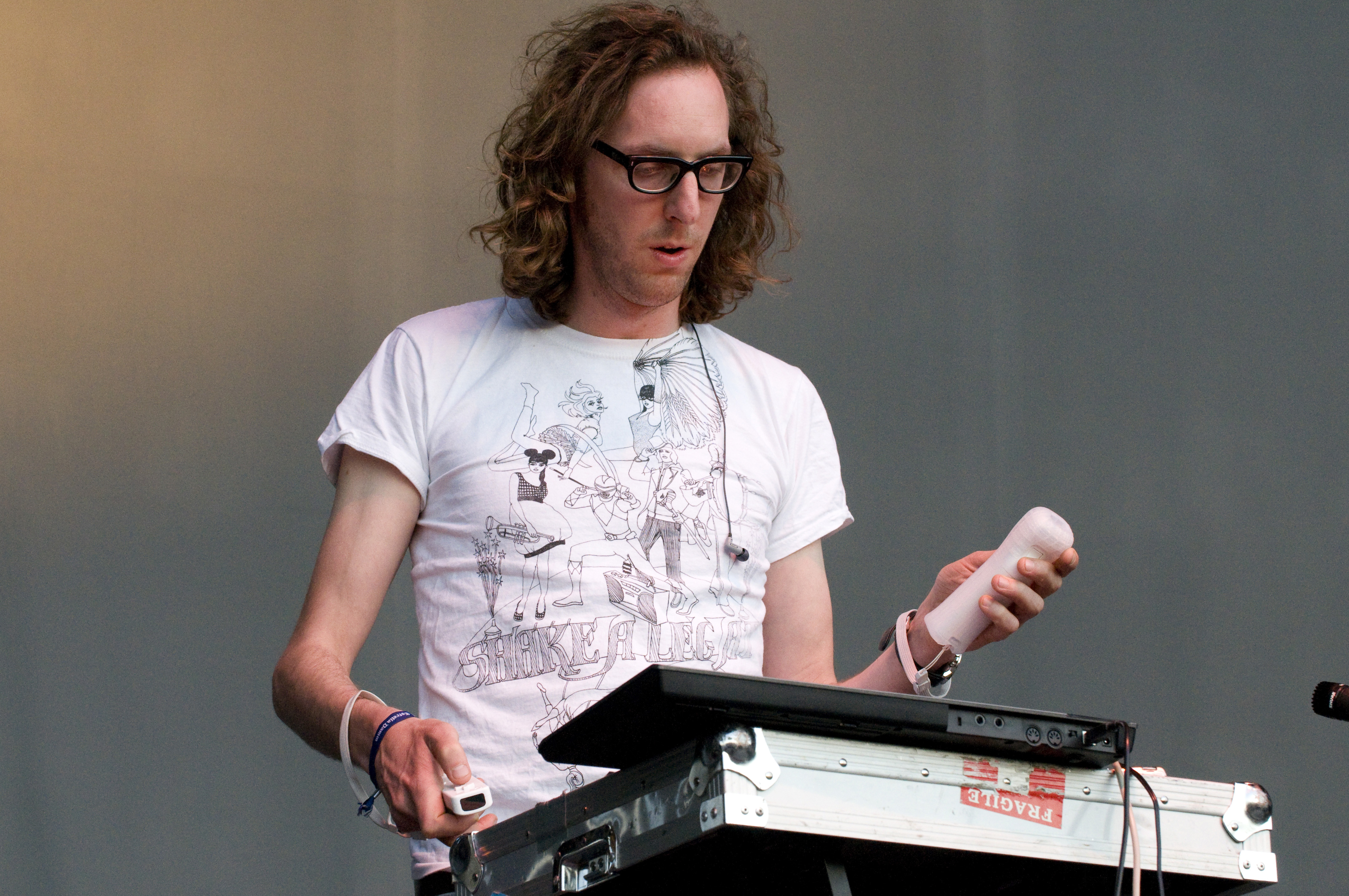
Performing with The Notwist, 2008

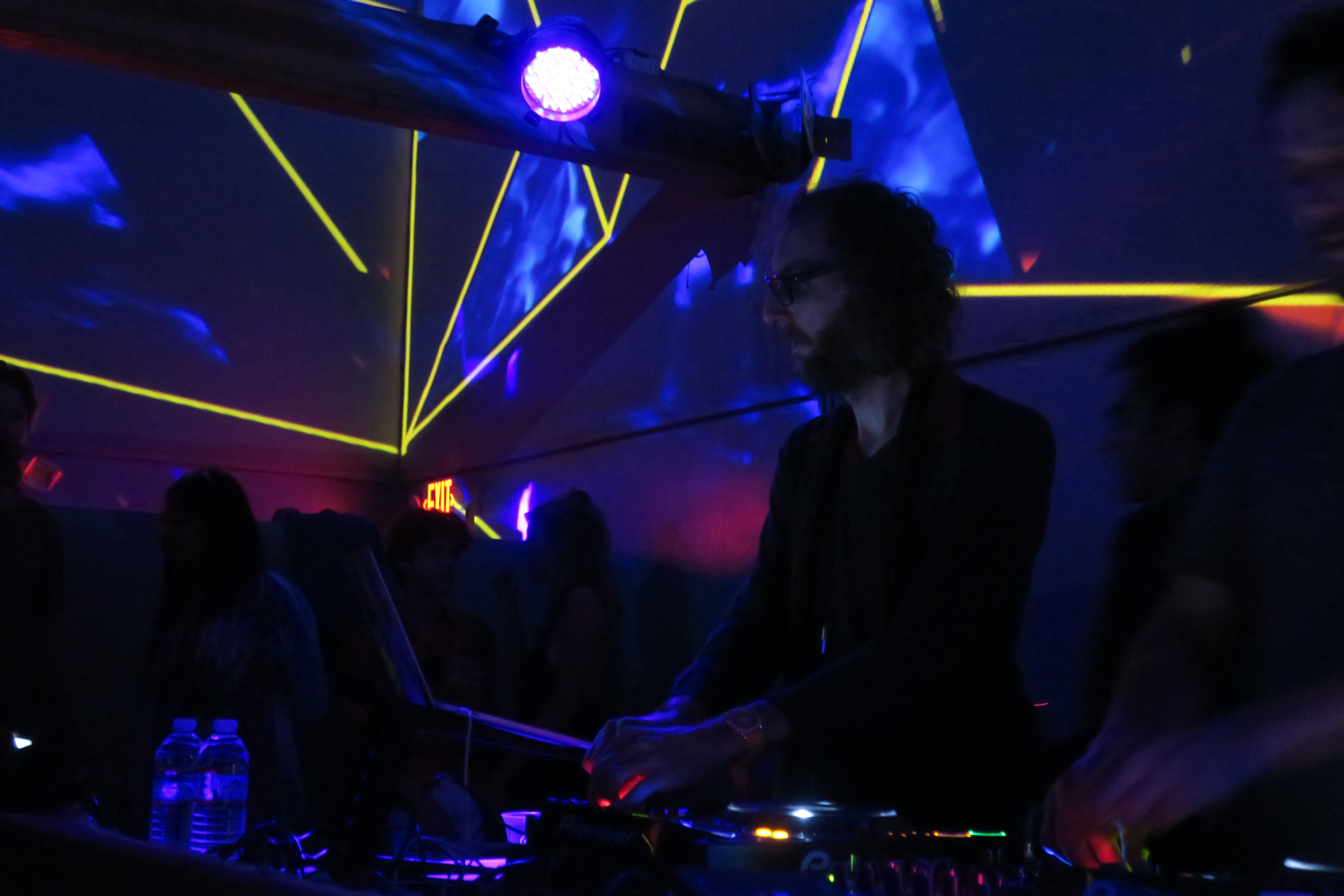
At Public Works, San Francisco, 2017
