= The Notwist =

German rock band

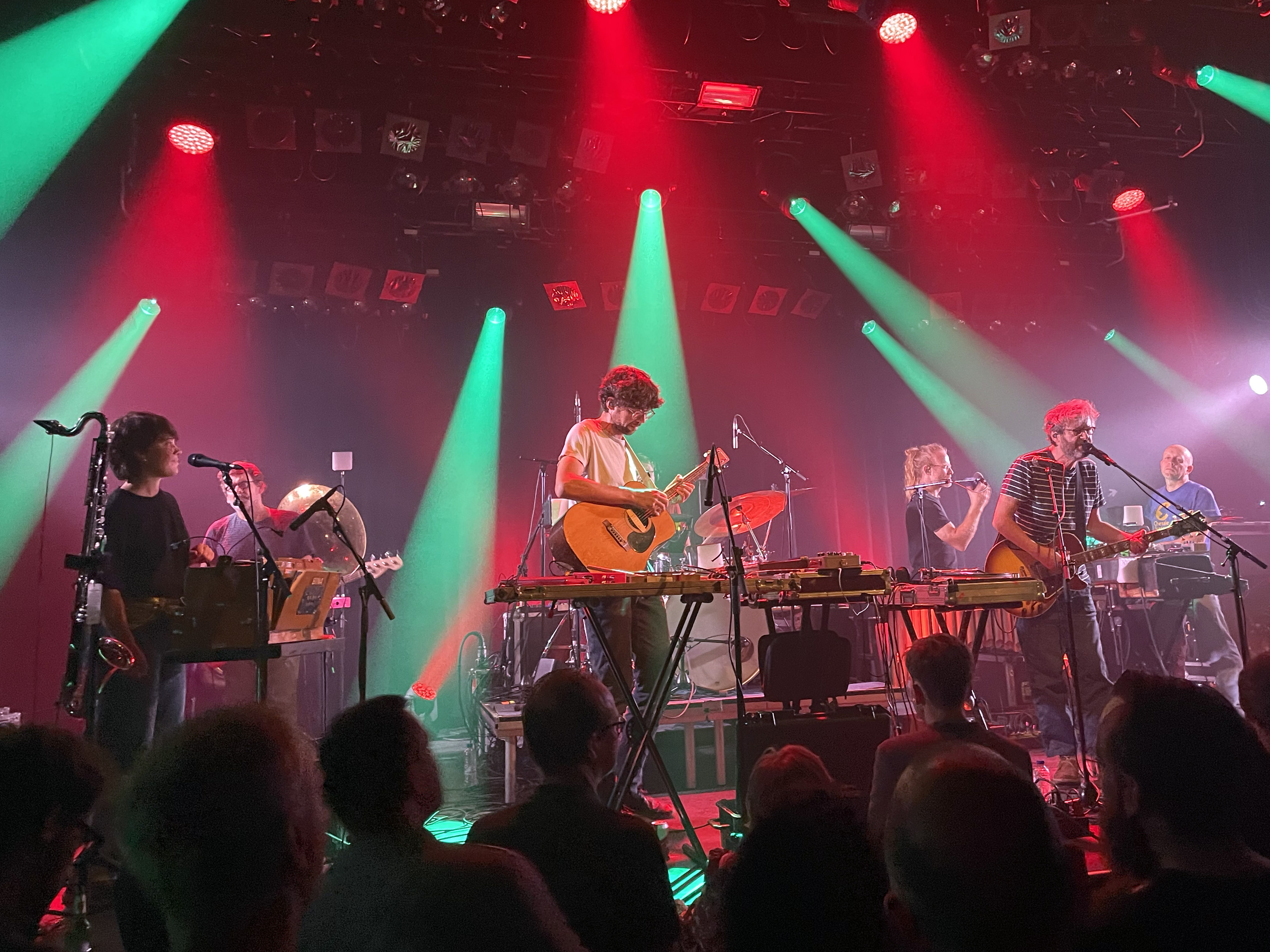
- The Notwist performing in 2023 in Doornroosje in Nijmegen, the Netherlands

Background information
- Origin: Weilheim in Oberbayern, Germany
- Genres: Indie rock, electronica, plinkerpop, post-rock, post-hardcore (early)
- Years active: 1989–present
- Labels: Morr Music, Sub Pop
- Members: Markus Acher; Micha Acher; Andi Haberl
- Past members: Martin Messerschmid; Martin Gretschmann
- Website: www.notwist.com

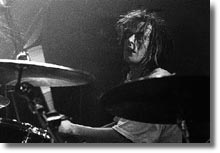
Martin "Mecki" Messerschmid (1994)

The Notwist /ˈnoʊ.twɪst/ are a German indie rock band. Formed in 1989, the band moved through several musical incarnations, despite maintaining a relatively stable line-up. While their early records moved through heavy metal into dark indie rock, their recent efforts for which they have received the most attention have been strongly influenced by the electronica scene, along with other groups on the record label Morr Music.

== History ==
Brothers Markus and Micha Acher and Martin "Mecki" Messerschmid formed the group in 1989 in Weilheim in Oberbayern, near Munich, from an earlier, more indie-folk version of the Notwist and the punk band Greatful Punishment. In 1990, they recorded their self-titled debut, a grunge-metal oriented LP. 1992 saw the release of Nook, which has an indie rock sound, while their 1995 album 12, contains their first flirtation with electronics. Martin Gretschmann then joined the group in 1997. Shrink, released in 1998, is a jazz-electro-rock album. In 1998, Cynthia Dall contributed vocals for a remix of 12's opening track, "Torture Day". The album Neon Golden (released in 2002) put them on the map for American listeners, with its heartfelt sentiment and more pop-oriented sound.

Messerschmid left the group in 2007, and was replaced by Andi Haberl. The band's sixth album, The Devil, You + Me, was released in Europe in May 2008. On June 17, 2008 the album was released in North America on Domino Records.

In 2009, the Notwist recorded Storm, the soundtrack to the film of the same name by director Hans-Christian Schmid. In late 2012 they began playing songs from a new album on tour. The album, Close to the Glass, was released on February 24, 2014 under Sub Pop Records.

In 2014, Martin Gretschmann left the group.

In January 2015, Close to the Glass was nominated for IMPALA's European Independent Album of the Year Award.

== Musical style and influences ==
The Notwist's music has at different times been described as indie rock and post-rock. The band has cited such bands as Stereolab, My Bloody Valentine, the Pastels, Broadcast, and Sonic Youth as consistent influences on their music.

== Collaborations and side projects ==
The group has been remixed by Four Tet, Caribou, Grizzly Bear, Console, Loopspool, Panda Bear and others. Markus also collaborated with Anticon and rapper/producer Alias on the song "Unseen Sights". In 1991, the Achers founded Village of Savoonga, a more experimental ensemble that incorporates noise, post rock and neoclassical elements, in Weilheim, Germany. The band also included members of Tied & Tickled Trio, Fred Is Dead and others, and released three albums: Village Of Savoonga (1992), Philipp Schatz (1996) and Score (1997).

The Notwist formed a group with Themselves named 13 & God, whose eponymous debut was released in 2005. Markus also worked with the band Lali Puna until his departure in 2017, while Mecki Messerschmid now plays drums for the reformed Schweisser. Micha Acher composes and programs for Ms. John Soda.

== Members ==
=== Current ===
- Markus Acher — guitars, vocals, keyboards, turntables (1989–present)
- Micha Acher — bass, keyboards (1989–present)
- Andi Haberl — drums (2007–present)
- Max Punktezahl of Saroos — guitar, keyboards (present)
- Karl Ivar Refseth — vibraphone, percussion (present)
- Cico Beck of Joasihno — guitar, keyboards, percussion, electronics (present)
- Theresa Loibl - bass clarinet, harmonium, and keyboard (present)

=== Former ===
- Martin Gretschmann (aka Console and Acid Pauli) — programming, keyboards (1997–2014)
- Martin Messerschmid — drums (1989–2007)

== Discography ==
=== Studio albums ===
- The Notwist (1991)
- Nook (1992)
- 12 (1995)
- Shrink (1998)
- Neon Golden (2002)
- The Devil, You + Me (2008)
- Sturm (soundtrack, 2009)
- Close to the Glass (2014)
- The Messier Objects (2015)
- Vertigo Days (2021)
- News from Planet Zombie (2026)

=== Live Album ===
- Superheroes, Ghostvillains + Stuff (2016)
- Vertigo Days - Live from the Alien Research Center (2023)

=== Singles and EPs ===
- Johnny and Mary Split-EP with The Slumlords, Trash Can Trasher and √c (1994)
- Only in America EP (1996)
- Untitled (Selections From 12) EP (1997)
- "Day 7" EP (1997)
- "Chemicals" EP (1998)
- "Trashing Days" single (2001)
- "Pilot" single (2001)
- "Pick Up the Phone" single (2002)
- "One With the Freaks" single (2002)
- Untitled (Scoop) EP (2002)
- Lichter EP (2003) (Soundtrack for the film Distant Lights (Lichter))
- Different Cars and Trains EP (2003)
- Solo Swim EP (2004)
- "Where in this World" single (2008)
- "Boneless" single (2008)
- "Come In" single (2009)
- "Blank Air" single (2010)
- "Kong" single (2014)
- Run Run Run EP (2014)
- Ship EP (2020)
